= Šiauliai Ghetto =

Nazi ghetto in occupied Lithuania

Coordinates: 55.926567°N 23.326°E

The Šiauliai or Shavli Ghetto was a Jewish ghetto established in July 1941 by Nazi Germany in the city of Šiauliai (Yiddish: שאַװל, Shavl) in Nazi-occupied Lithuania during the Holocaust. The ghetto comprised two areas – one in the Kaukazas suburb and one on Trakai Street. Both were liquidated by July 1944, and their inhabitants were killed or transferred to Nazi concentration camps. In 1939, one quarter of the population of Šiauliai was Jewish, about 8,000 persons. By the end of World War II, only about 500 Jews of the city had survived.

== Before the war ==
Šiauliai was the second largest city in independent pre-war Lithuania, and its Jewish community, numbering 8,000 in 1939. The city had elected Rafal Riazanskis, a local Jewish businessman, as its deputy mayor. Jews were involved in the manufacture of leather products, and there was a Jewish-owned shoe factory. Jews were also involved in the iron and chemical industries, and many worked as clerks, laborers, and craftsmen.

The Jewish community supported numerous cultural and social institutions and organizations. Among these were Yavneh, a religious secondary school, a Hebrew secondary school, an elementary school, and a kindergarten, as well as several Yiddish schools. There were 15 synagogues, a yeshiva, and two libraries.

== Mass murders ==
After the start of the German invasion of the Soviet Union, and before the arrival of the Germans in Lithuania, several hundred Jews from the city fled to Russia. German soldiers entered Šiauliai on 26 June 1941. Of the Jews who remained, several thousand were massacred by the Germans and their Lithuanian collaborators, both before the ghetto was established and thereafter.

During the first weeks of the Nazi occupation, about 8000 people were shot in the nearby Lieponiai forest near Kužiai after being forced to dig their own graves. In July 1941, the Germans moved 732 Jews and communists from the Šiauliai jail to the vicinity of Pročiūnai village, about 7 km (4.3 mi) southeast from Šiauliai, and murdered them there. From 7–15 September 1941, about 1000 Jewish men, women and children from Šiauliai were killed in the Gubernija forest, about 6 km (3.7 mi) northwest of the city.

== Establishment ==
The German occupation authorities began preparations for a ghetto in Šiauliai at the beginning of July 1941. The Šiauliai city military commandant gave instructions to the new deputy mayor, Antanas Stankus, who had been put in charge of "Jewish affairs". Stankus set up a committee of Jewish notables to liaise with the Lithuanian authorities to relocate Jews. The first step was the registration of all Jewish residents – all the Jews in the city were required to register at the city government's office from 19–22 July.

At first, only one location, in the Kaukazas neighborhood, was selected for the ghetto. The area proved to be too small for the entire Jewish population, and additional Jews were transported to Žagarė. After Jewish protests, a second location between Ežeras and Trakai streets was chosen. When both areas housed approximately 3000 Jews each, the Jews petitioned for a third ghetto. The authorities promised an area in the Kalniukas neighborhood and gathered more Jews in the Village Traders’ Synagogue, the Jewish Home for the Elderly, and the Central Choral Synagogue. However, instead of being relocated to the third ghetto, the Jews were taken in groups of 200–300 to Lieponiai forest and shot. The last 500 Jews were shot in Bubiai and were buried in pits dug from clay.

== Life in the ghetto ==
The resettlement was completed by 15 August. Between 4,000 and 5,000 Jews, including 1,500 from areas surrounding Šiauliai, were forced into the ghettos and were interned there. The Jewish committee was recognized as the Judenrat (Jewish Council) of the ghetto. The Germans conducted frequent Aktionen – massive killing sprees – to eliminate "useless" Jews. Gainful employment was perceived to provide security from these Aktionen. Approximately 600 Jews were employed in a nearby shoe factory, and another 600 in construction projects at the Zokniai airport. Others were employed in workshops in the city tanning and processing leather, producing items such as gloves and brushes. Some Jews were transferred to labor camps in the surrounding areas to provide labor force for specific projects, mainly extracting peat from peat bogs. A group of 125 Jews was transferred to Linkaičiai, where they worked in a weapons and artillery workshop.

The period from around January 1942 to September 1943, was a "quiet period" without major massacres. During that time the Jews in the ghetto established several cultural and educational organizations, including Hechalutz and Beitar. On 26–27 May 1942, the Germans conducted a census within the Generalbezirk Litauen, including the Šiauliai Ghetto. The census counted at least 4,665 Jews in the ghetto, but many avoided the census as they believed it to be a ruse in preparation for another Aktion. On 30 August 1942, several Jews were found smuggling food into the ghetto. The Germans told the Judenrat to select 50 Jews for execution. The members of the Judenrat refused and instead offered themselves. The sentence was commuted and one food smuggler was hanged.

== Liquidation ==
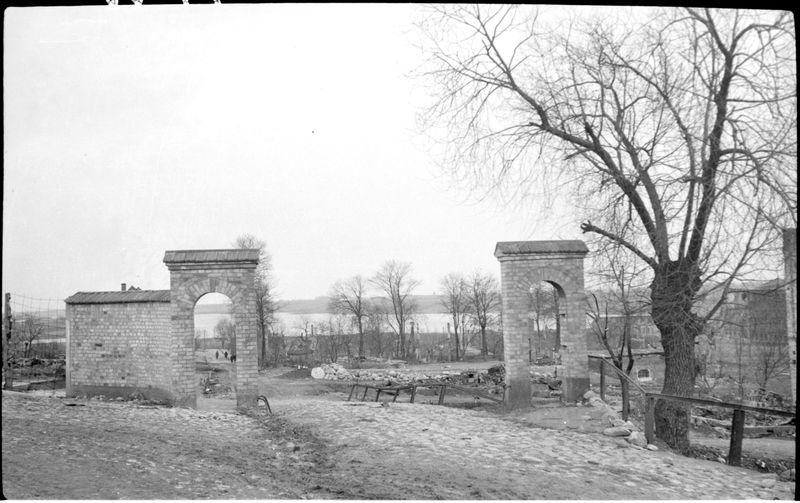
Gates of the destroyed ghetto in 1944

On June 21, 1943, Heinrich Himmler issued an order to liquidate all ghettos and transfer remaining Jews to concentration camps. The Šiauliai Ghetto was reorganized into a concentration camp, an exterior camp (Außenlager) of the Kaunas concentration camp (Kaunas Ghetto) under jurisdiction of the SS. At the time, the ghetto had five work camps: Zokniai airport (500 Jews), Linkaičiai weapon workshop (250 Jews), Pavenčiai sugar factory (250 Jews), A.B.A. military clothing workshop (800 Jews), Akmenė brick factory (250 Jews) and Daugėliai brick factory (250 Jews). Territorial Commissioner (Gebietskommissar) Hans Gewecke was replaced by SS-Oberscharführer Hermann Schlöf on 1 October 1943 as commander of the ghetto.

The original Kaukazas neighborhood ghetto site was liquidated in mid-October 1943. On November 5, 1943, SS troops and a company from the Russian Liberation Army seized and transported 574 children under the age of 13, 191 elderly, 26 disabled, and 4 women to Auschwitz concentration camp.

Later, as Germany was losing the war, the Nazis started closing down work camps and transferring the Jews into the ghetto. In July 1944, the Germans, retreating from the advancing Russian army, transferred remaining ghetto residents to the concentration camps of Stutthof and Dachau in Germany. Of the total number of Jews interned, only a few hundred managed by various means to escape death. On 15 July 1944, the final liquidation of the Šiauliai ghetto began. Several thousand Jews were deported in four large groups to the Stutthof concentration camp.

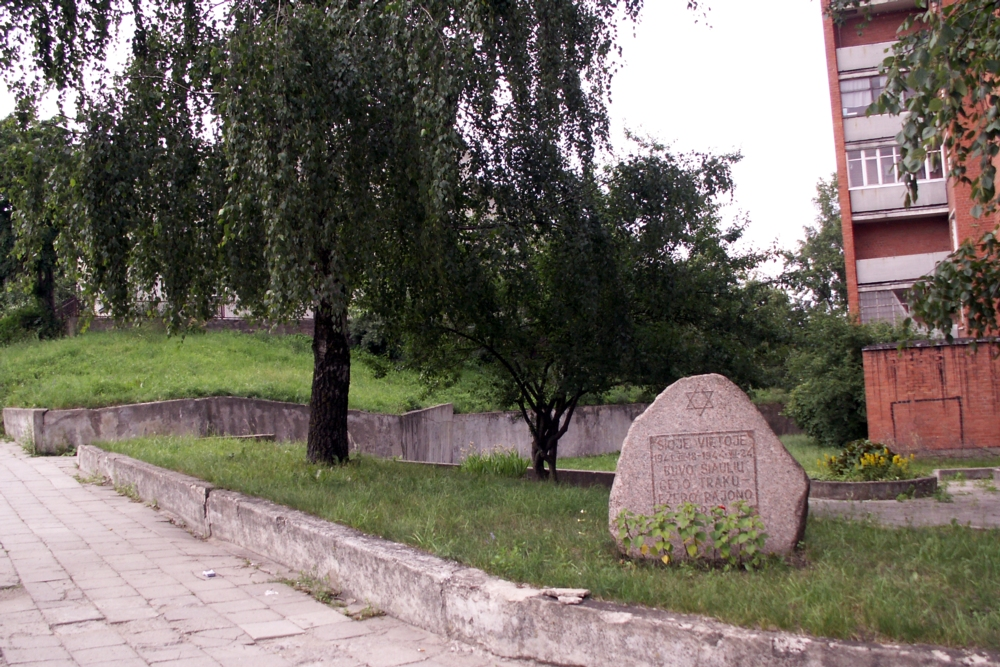
Marker indicating the location of the Šiauliai ghetto at Trakai Street

No more than 500 people were identified as survivors of the Šiauliai Ghetto after the war.

== Documentation ==
A diary kept by Eliezer Yerushalmi, a teacher and a member of the ghetto's Judenrat, was published in Hebrew in 1950 by Yad Vashem. A portion of this diary was included in the Black Book. Based on the May 1942 census, lists of the names of the Kaukazas and Ežero-Trakų ghetto prisoners, as well as Jews who stayed outside the ghetto, were published by the Vilna Gaon Jewish State Museum in 2002.

== See also ==
- Lithuanian collaboration with Nazi Germany
- Nesse Godin, Holocaust survivor from Šiauliai
