= Hans Gewecke =

German Nazi official (1906–1991)

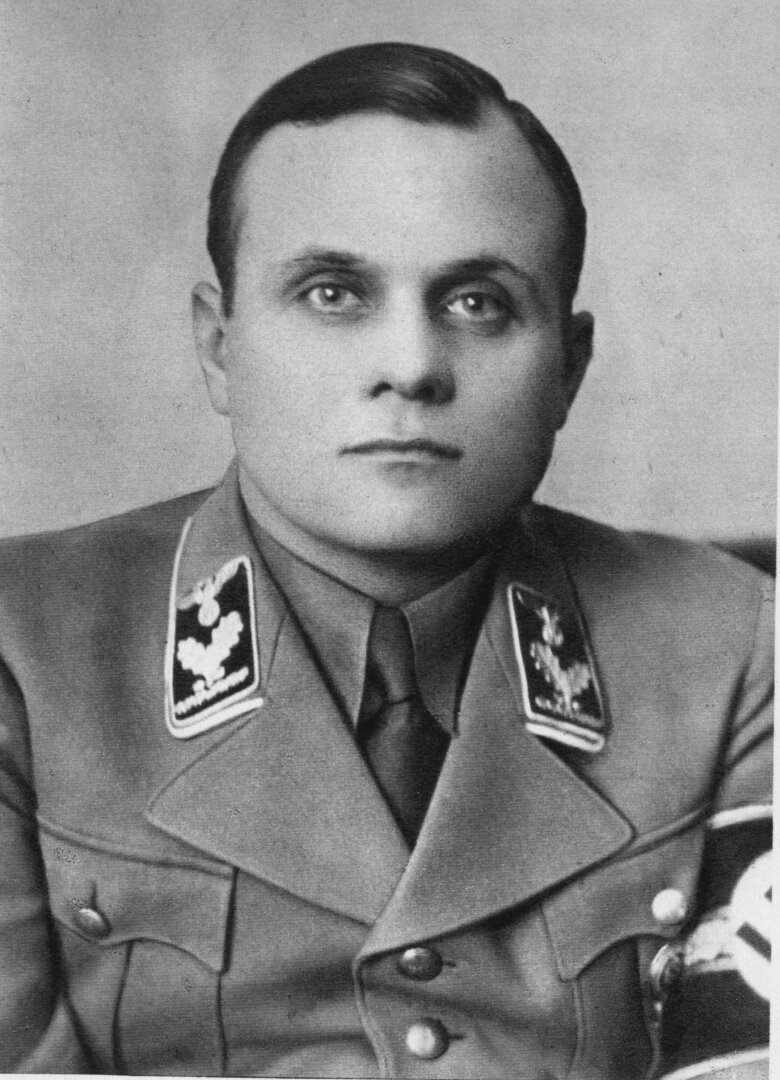
- Gewecke in 1941

Personal details
- Born: July 17, 1906 Hachenhausen, Duchy of Brunswick, German Empire
- Died: March 10, 1991 (aged 84) Heidelberg, Baden-Württemberg, Germany

Hans Ernst-August Friedrich Gewecke (17 July 1906 – 10 March 1991) was a German politician, a Nazi Party member of the Reichstag and the Party Kreisleiter in the District of Duchy of Lauenburg.

From 25 July 1941 until 1944, Gewecke worked as the regional commissioner in Šiauliai, a large city in northern Lithuania, which was assigned to Generalbezirk Litauen within Reichskommissariat Ostland during the German occupation of Lithuania during World War II. As regional commissioner, he formally belonged to the civil administration and was ideologically bound to the programs of Reichskommissar Hinrich Lohse (also a native of Schleswig-Holstein) and the Reich Ministry for the Occupied Eastern Territories under the leadership of Alfred Rosenberg. In his office, Gewecke personally participated in selections and executions in Šiauliai, especially with regard to the genocide of the Jews.

== Early life ==
Gewecke attended schools in Gandersheim, Düsseldorf, and Braunschweig. He initially attended secondary school only until the upper sixth form and then began an agricultural apprenticeship on his father's farm. After one and a half years, he abandoned his apprenticeship and entered the final year of the Johanneum in Lübeck, where he graduated with his Abitur.

== Weimar Republic ==
After graduating from high school, he worked for his father again because financial reasons prevented him from studying. In 1927, Gewecke joined the Schutzpolizei in the Free State of Brunswick as an officer candidate, but was unable to meet the tough physical demands of this job. Therefore, after just under a year, he returned to his father's farm. He then came into contact with the Nazi Party and attended some of its events in Lübeck. On July 1, 1928, he joined the Nazi Party (membership number 94,286). He founded the Nazi Party Ortsgruppe in Reinbek and became the Ortsgruppenleiter in 1929. He became a sought-after speaker, becoming first a district, then a Gau, and finally a national speaker for the Nazi Party.

The authors Danker and Schwabe described him with the words:

"Gewecke, a member of the NSDAP since the age of 22, failed several times in civilian life. However, he distinguished himself as a fanatical propagandist and rabid anti-Semite."

== Nazi Germany ==
=== Nazi Party Kreisleiter ===
As early as 1931, Gewecke became the full-time Kreisleiter (county leader) in the Duchy of Lauenburg. He retained this position until 1945. In the March 1933 German federal election, he was elected to the Reichstag for electoral constituency 13 (Schleswig-Holstein), retaining this seat until 1945. In 1933, he was temporarily a member of the Landtag of Prussia.

In October 1933, Gewecke stated that "the district's newspapers were trully loyal to the National Socialist state and its leaders." The National Socialists acted against Jews with the "necessary intensity and National Socialist severity" – as Gewecke put it – to achieve the "Final Solution to the Jewish question."

=== Gebietskommissar ===
After the German invasion of the Soviet Union in June 1941, Gewecke became an employee of the civil administration in the Reichskommissariat Ostland, one of the main sites of the Holocaust. Under Reichskommissar Hinrich Lohse, who had already been his superior as Oberpräsident and Gauleiter of Schleswig-Holstein, Gewecke served as regional commissioner of Šiauliai in Lithuania. He coordinated the civil administration's measures and the placement of Jews who had survived the first waves of killings in the ghettos, including the Šiauliai Ghetto. Danker and Schwabe wrote about Gewecke:

"He is one of those civil administrators who, after initial hesitation, act all the more brutally as master races, and personally participates in selections and executions."

== Post-war period ==
In 1945, Gewecke was arrested and interned by the Allies. His assets, which stemmed primarily from his work as a civil administrator in Lithuania, were confiscated. From then on, he worked as an insurance agent in Bad Oldesloe.

Later, Gewecke was repeatedly investigated for the persecution of Jews in Lithuania and in Šiauliai. As a result, Gewecke was forced to testify in court repeatedly. In 1958, Gewecke defended himself in court to the Lübeck public prosecutor:

"I hereby certify that I have not once instigated the elimination of a Jew, or helped prepare the elimination of a Jew, or even participated in the elimination of a Jew."

In addition, he said that:

"My department was, of course, concerned with the proper (!) confiscation and registration of Jewish property. There were very specific orders from the highest leadership for this [...] These items [...] then had to be properly registered, precisely listed, and delivered to the Reich via the responsible authorities—so to speak."

In the same interrogation, he admitted that, as part of the ghettoization of the Jews, "members of the Regional Commissariat [...] assisted in this operation to transfer the Jews from their homes to the ghettos." However, no conviction was brought for this persecution of Jews and the subsequent mass murder. In a court case for the murder of at least 700 Jews, Gewecke was released from prosecution in 1968. In 1971, Gewecke was sentenced to four and a half years in prison for aiding and abetting the manslaughter of a Jew in Lithuania in 1943. At the end of May 1943, Mazawetzki, a Jewish master baker aged between 30 and 35, was carrying about 30 packs of cigarettes, chocolate, and sausage on his way home to the Jewish ghetto. Lithuanian police arrested Mazawetzki. The regional commissar (either Gewecke or his deputy) subsequently decided to hang Mazawetzki. Gewecke rejected numerous requests for clemency from the Judenrat and Mazawetzki's relatives. He denied this during an interrogation in 1958, but stated with anti-Semitic connotations:

"It is quite possible that the Jews, because that was their custom, offered me a large sum of money for it."

But Gewecke could not have prevented the execution and therefore did not even attempt it. The ghetto craftsmen built the gallows. In the early morning of June 6, 1943, two other Jews were forced to hang Mazawetzki. All inmates of both ghettos in Šiauliai were forced to witness the murder and the body had to remain hanging until midday. In his trial, Gewecke even claimed to have saved Jews:

"I may, without being arrogant, also declare that I claim to have saved the Jews who were transported to the Reich before the evacuation of Šiauliai – approximately 5,000 – from extermination by the SD. I ask you to believe me when I say that I fought many battles with both the Reich Commissioner (!) and other people to preserve the lives of these Jews, and that I succeeded in outwitting the SD on several occasions."

== Literature ==
- Curilla, Wolfgang (2006). Die deutsche Ordnungspolizei und der Holocaust im Baltikum und in Weißrußland 1941 bis 1944 (in German). Paderborn. ISBN 978-3-506-71787-0.
- Danker, Uwe (November 1998). Pohl, Reinhard (ed.). "Der Judenmord im Reichskommissariat Ostland". Gegenwind (in German). 128.
- Danker, Uwe; Schwabe, Astrid (2005). Schleswig-Holstein und der Nationalsozialismus (in German). Wachholtz, Neumünster. ISBN 3-529-02810-X.
- Dieckmann, Christoph (2011). Deutsche Besatzungspolitik in Litauen 1941–1944 (in German). Wallstein, Göttingen. ISBN 978-3-8353-0929-6.
- Gräfe, Karl Heinz (2010). Vom Donnerkreuz zum Hakenkreuz. Die baltischen Staaten zwischen Diktatur und Okkupation (in German). Berlin: Edition Organon. p. 433. ISBN 978-3-931034-11-5.
- Klee, Ernst (2007). Personenlexikon zum Dritten Reich (in German) (2nd ed.). Frankfurt am Main. p. 182. ISBN 978-3-596-16048-8.
- Lehmann, Sebastian; Danker, Uwe; Bohn, Robert (2012). Reichskommissariat Ostland. Tatort und Erinnerungsobjekt (in German). Paderborn: Edition Organon. p. 433. ISBN 9783506771889.
