= Ligia B. Bieliukas =

- Ligia Bieliukas, from a 1961 newspaper
- Born: Ligia Bezumavicius; 1923; Šiauliai, Lithuania
- Died: June 28, 1966; New York City
- Other names: Ligija Bieliukenė
- Occupation(s): Medical technologist, clubwoman
- Known for: Active in the Lithuanian underground in World War II

Ligia Bezumavicius Bieliukas (1923 – June 28, 1966), also written as Ligija Bieliukenė, was a member of the Lithuanian underground during World War II, and a medical technologist in New York City. She was president of the Federation of Lithuanian Women's Clubs from 1953, and three-term president of the Baltic Women's Council.

== Early life and education ==
Ligia Bezumavicius was born in Šiauliai, Lithuania, the daughter of Henrikas (or Genrikas) Bezumavičius and Maria (or Marija) Bezumavičienė. She attended the University of Kaunas until her education was interrupted by war. She completed a degree in psychology in 1948, in Munich.

== Career ==
Bezumavicius was a philosophy student when she joined the Lithuanian underground in 1943, to fight Nazi occupation during World War II. She smuggled weapons, published anonymous anti-German materials, and helped Lithuanians escaping Nazi persecution.

In the United States after 1949, Bieliukas was chief technologist of the Roosevelt Hospital blood bank, and supervisor of the blood bank at Albert Einstein College of Medicine. She was president of the international Federation of Lithuanian Women's Clubs from 1953, and three-term president of the Baltic Women's Council. She was "nationalities advisor" to the General Federation of Women's Clubs (GFWC), and in 1953 protested the GFWC's position that foreign-born residents in the United States should either seek citizenship or face deportation after five years. She explained that refugees, elderly immigrants, and young children had multiple practical reasons not to begin the citizenship process. She was a speaker at women's clubs and other community organizations.

== Personal life ==
Ligia Bezumavicius married lawyer Bronius Bieliukas, brother of geographer Kazimieras Bieliukas; her husband and brother-in-law were also involved in the Lithuanian resistance to Nazi occupation. She died in 1966, from a severe asthma attack, in New York City. She was 42 years old.
