= Bruklinas =

Bruklinas is a privately owned commercial zone in Šiauliai, Lithuania. It consists of shopping, entertainment, car service, office and hotel facilities, its total floor area is 50,000 m^{2} and land area is 9 ha.

Bruklinas was developed by Ogmios group. Previously a location for "Šiaulių Oda" factory, it was initially redeveloped as a smaller Ogmios Šiauliai shopping mall, and rebranded Bruklinas after a major expansion was completed in 2006–2007.

Bruklinas means Brooklyn in Lithuanian and the mall is designed after this borough and New York City in general, including motifs of the Brooklyn Bridge in its exterior.

28,000 m^{2} of the total floor area is outlet shopping mall (anchor tenant "Norfa" supermarket, 5000 m^{2}), 8,000 m^{2} is a future hotel/office building, 15,000 m^{2} is an interior and home decoration store, with a lot for another 10,000 m^{2} building available.
