= Abraham B. Rhine =

Lithuanian-American rabbi

Abraham Benedict Rhine (September 6, 1877 – August 8, 1941) was a Lithuanian-American rabbi who ministered in Hot Springs, Arkansas for nearly 40 years.

== Life ==
Rhine was born on September 6, 1877, in Shavli, Kovno Governorate, Russia, the son of Mayer Rhine and Bella Appel. He immigrated to America in 1889.

Rhine attended New York City public schools, Hughes High School in Cincinnati, Ohio, the University of Cincinnati (graduating from there with a B.A. in 1901), the Emanu-El Theological Seminary Association in New York City, and Hebrew Union College. In 1902, he graduated from Hebrew Union College with a B.H.L. and was ordained a rabbi. In that same year, he became rabbi of Congregation House of Israel in Hot Springs, Arkansas. He served as rabbi there for the rest of his life. Over the years he became one of the best known communal leaders in the state, especially in education; he was president of the local Board of Education from 1931 to 1933 and from 1938 to 1939, a founder of the Arkansas State Association of School Boards and its president from 1934 to 1939, and a member of the Governor's Advisory on Education in 1940.

Rhine was a director of the National Jewish Hospital in Denver, Colorado, a founder and executive secretary of the Leo N. Levi Memorial Hospital, a member of the Hebrew Union College board of governors, and a founder and honorary president of the Arkansas Jewish Assembly. He received an honorary D.D. from Hebrew Union College in 1910. A contributor to The Jewish Encyclopedia, his published works include Leon Gordon in 1910, Tales from the Midrash in 1911, a five-volume translation of Heinrich Graetz's Popular History of the Jews in 1919, and The Essence of the Bible in 1930.

Raisin was an executive committee member of the Arkansas Tuberculosis Association, vice-president of the Hot Springs Community Chest, co-editor of the H.U.C. Journal from 1901 to 1902, editor of Hot Springs' The Jewish Advocate from 1905 to 1906, chairman of the Garland County Unemployment Committee from 1932 to 1934, a trustee of the Arkansas School for Girls from 1922 to 1932, and a member of the Central Conference of American Rabbis, the American Academy for Jewish Research, B'nai B'rith, the Freemasons, and the Rotary Club. In 1905, he married Annette Wiener. She died in 1934. Their only child was Belle Frances, wife of William H. Sahud.

Rhine died in Michael Reese Hospital in Chicago, Illinois, on August 8, 1941. His funeral was held in Hot Springs.
