= Regbio klubas Vairas =

Vairas
- Full name: Regbio klubas Vairas
- Location: Šiauliai, Lithuania
- Ground(s): Zoknių stadionas
- President: Genadijus Mikšys
- Coach(es): Sigitas Kukulskis, Gediminas Marcišauskas
Team kit

Regbio klubas Vairas (also known as Vairas-Jupoja for sponsorship reasons) is a Lithuanian amateur rugby club based in the city of Šiauliai.

== Honours ==
- Lithuanian Rugby Championships
  - 1982, 1983, 1984, 1986, 1987, 1988, 1989, 1992, 1994, 1995, 1997, 1998, 1999, 2000, 2001, 2002, 2003, 2005, 2007, 2008, 2009, 2010, 2011, 2012, 2013
- Lithuanian Rugby Sevens
  - 1994, 1995, 1996, 1997, 1998, 1999, 2000, 2003, 2007, 2008, 2009, 2010, 2013
