= Šiauliai =

- City municipality
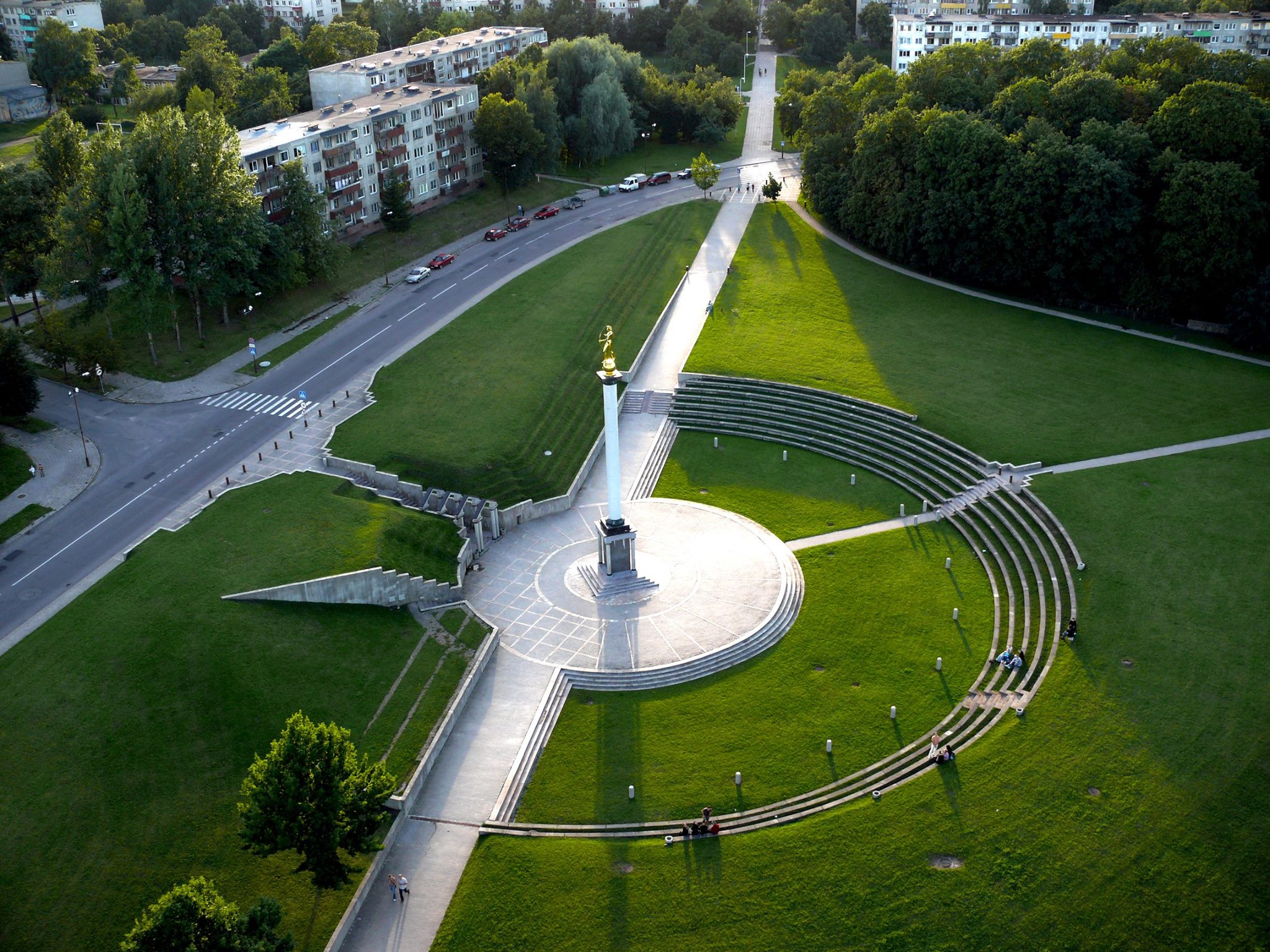
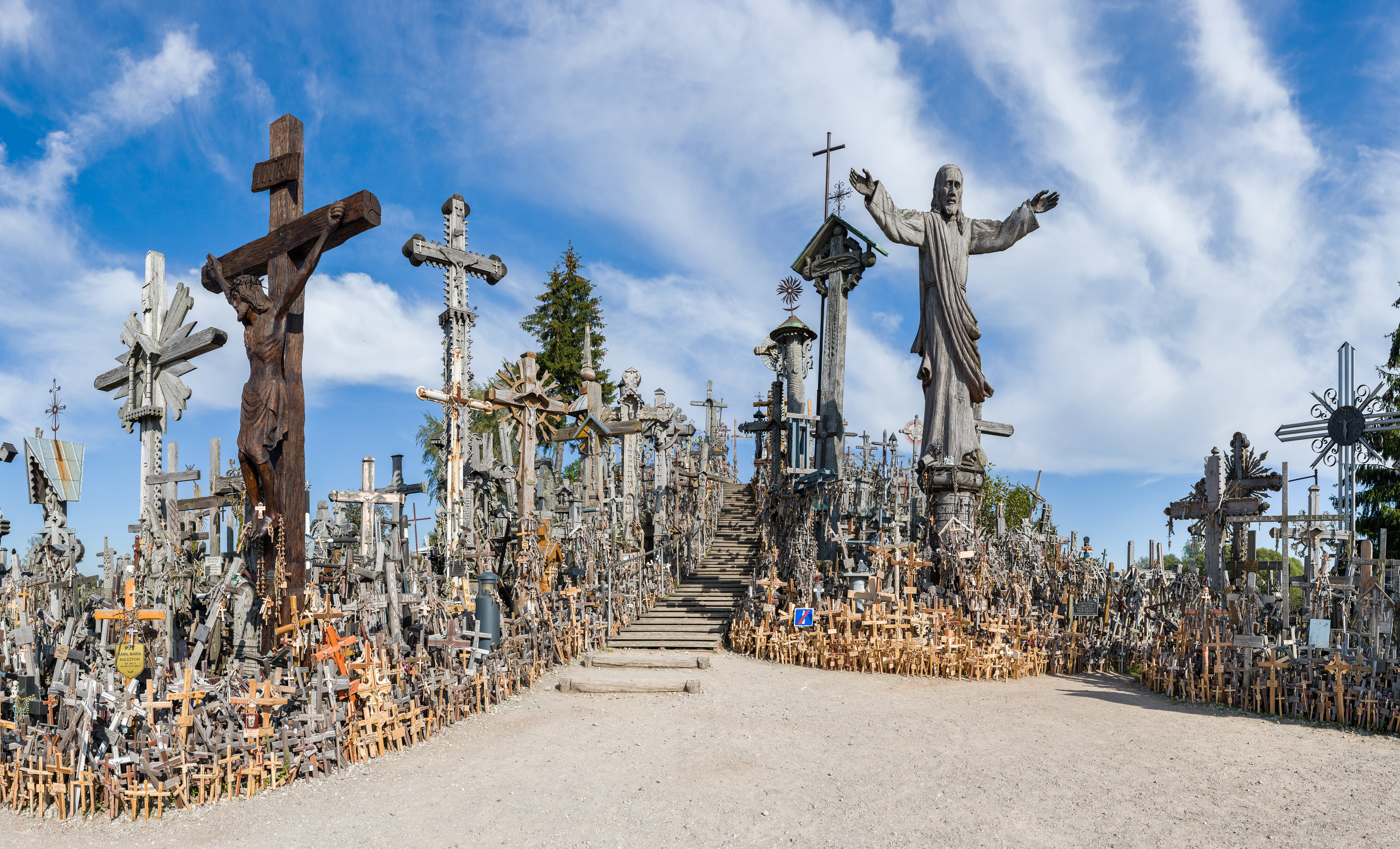
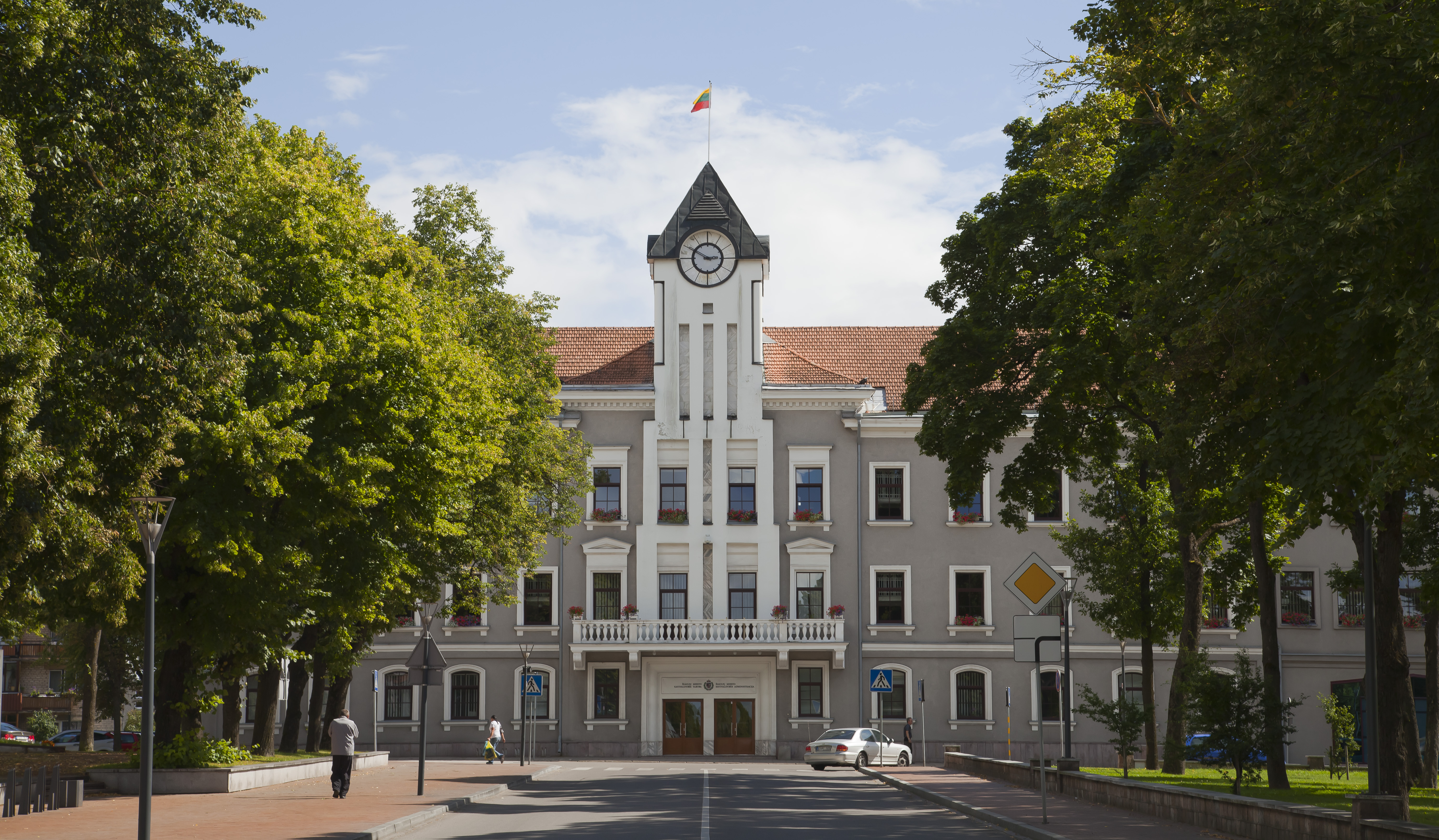
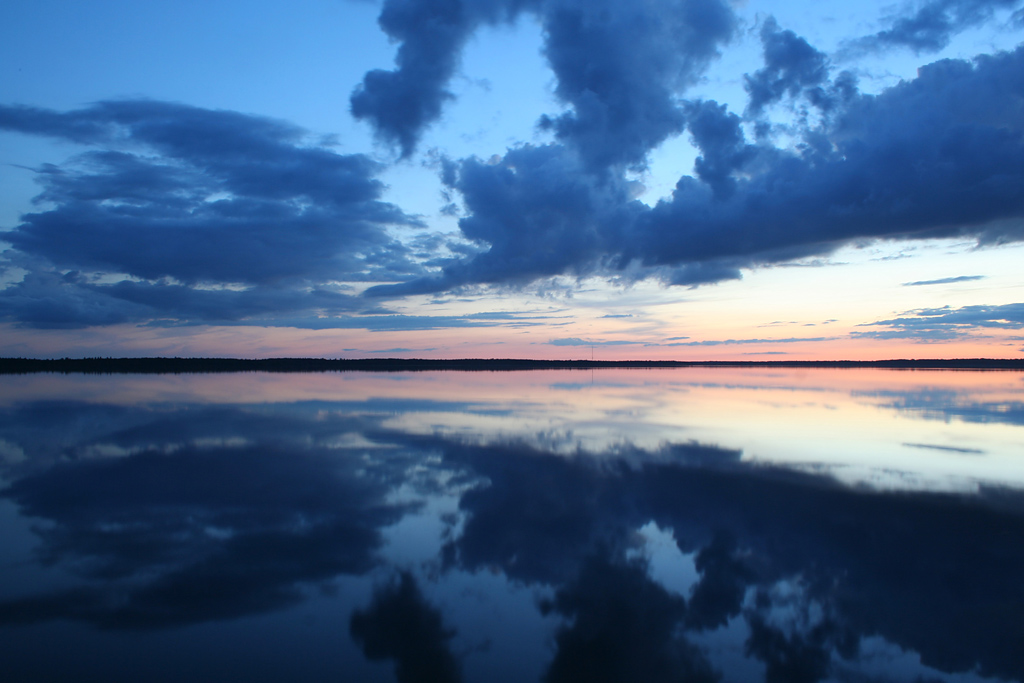
- Šiauliai State College and Cathedral The Golden Boy Hill of Crosses Town Hall Lake Rėkyva

- Flag Coat of arms
- Nickname: Saulės miestas (The City of the Sun)
- Location of Šiauliai in Lithuania
- Location within Lithuania Location within Europe
- Coordinates: 55°56′N 23°19′E
- Country: Lithuania
- Ethnographic region: a border of Samogitia and Aukštaitija
- County: Šiauliai County
- Municipality: Šiauliai city municipality
- Capital of: Šiauliai County; Šiauliai city municipality Šiauliai district municipality
- First mentioned: 1236
- Granted city rights: 1589
- Elderships: Rekyva, Medelynas

Government
  - Mayor: Artūras Visockas

Area
  - City municipality: 81.13 km^{2} (31.32 sq mi)
- Elevation: 151 m (495 ft)

Population (2024)
  - City municipality: 112,581
  - Density: 1,388/km^{2} (3,594/sq mi)
  - Metro: 140,379
- Demonym(s): Šiaulian(s) (English) šiauliečiai (Lithuanian)
- Time zone: UTC+2 (EET)
  - Summer (DST): UTC+3 (EEST)
- Postal code: 76xxx
- Area code: (+370) 41
- Climate: Dfb
- Website: siauliai.lt

Šiauliai (/ʃaʊˈleɪ/; Lithuanian: [ɕɛʊ̯ˈlʲɛɪ̯ˑ]) is a city in northern Lithuania, the country's fourth largest city and the sixth largest city in the Baltic states, with a population of 112,581 in 2024. It was the capital of Šiauliai County from 1994 until 2010, when all county administrations in Lithuania were abolished.

== Names ==
Šiauliai is referred to by various names in different languages: Samogitian Šiaulē; Latvian Saule (historic) and Šauļi (modern); Polish Szawle [ˈʂavlɛ]; German Schaulen pronounced [ˈʃaʊ̯lən]; Belarusian Шаўляй [ʂau̯ˈlʲaj]; Russian Шавли Shavli [ˈʂavlʲɪ] (historic) and Шяуляй Shyaulyay [ʂɐʊˈlʲaj] (modern); Yiddish: שאַװל, romanized: Shavl.

== History ==
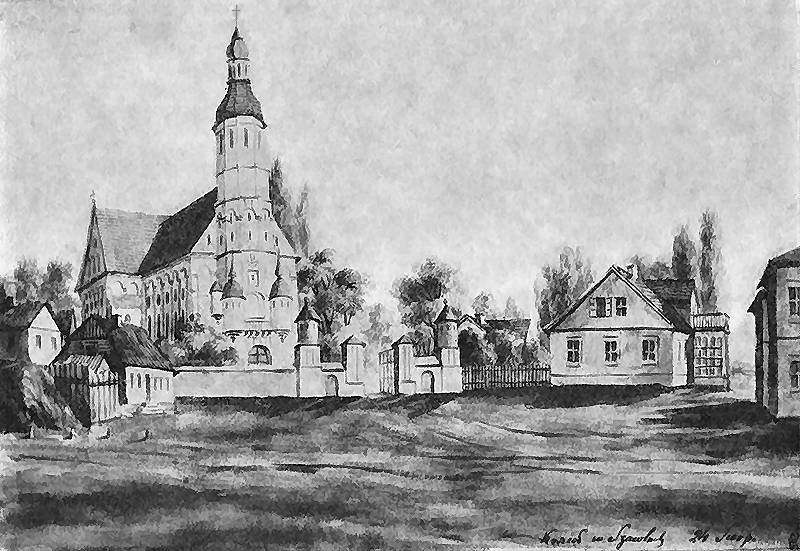
Cathedral of Šiauliai, 19th century

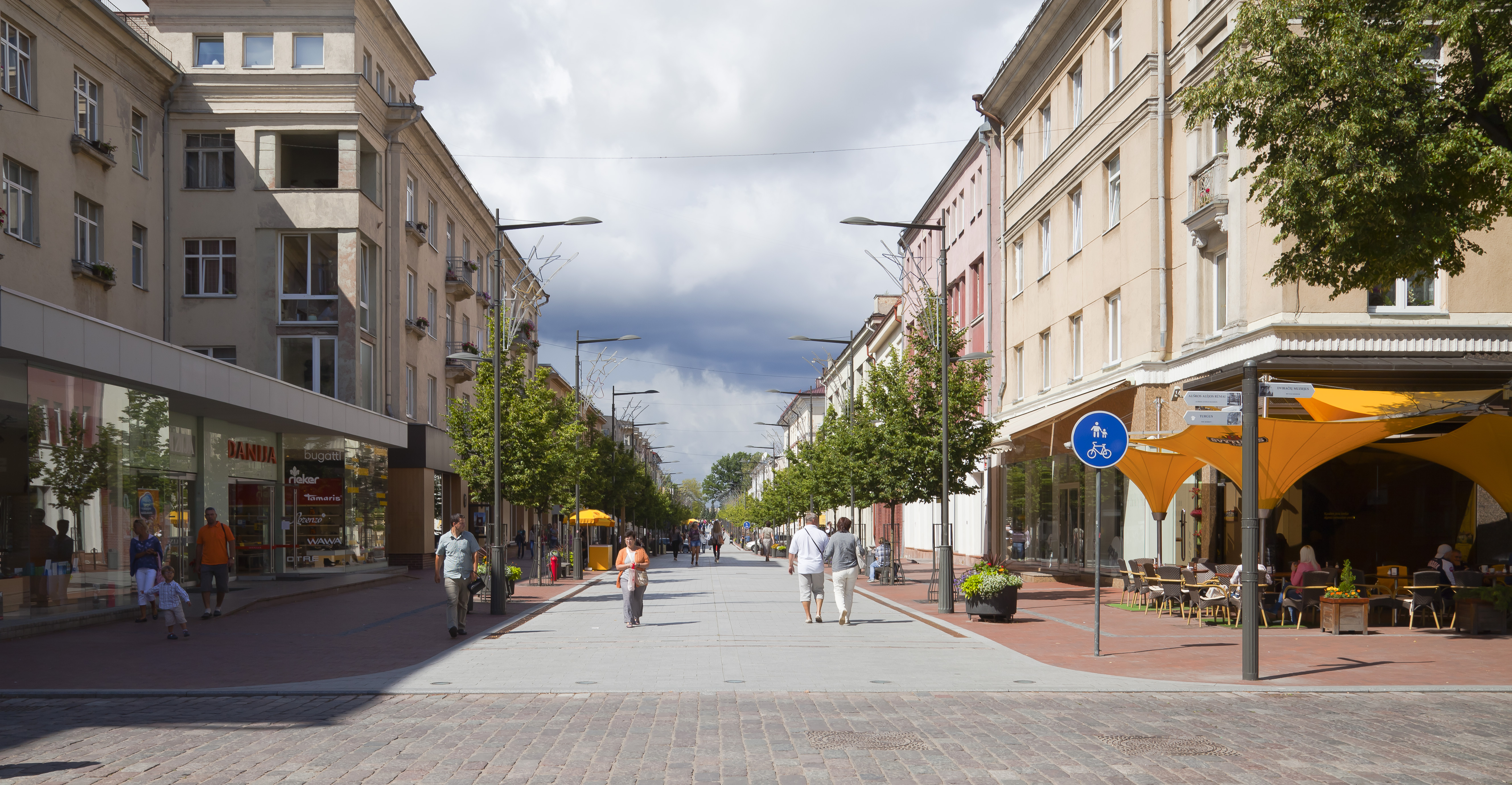
Vilnius Street in Šiauliai

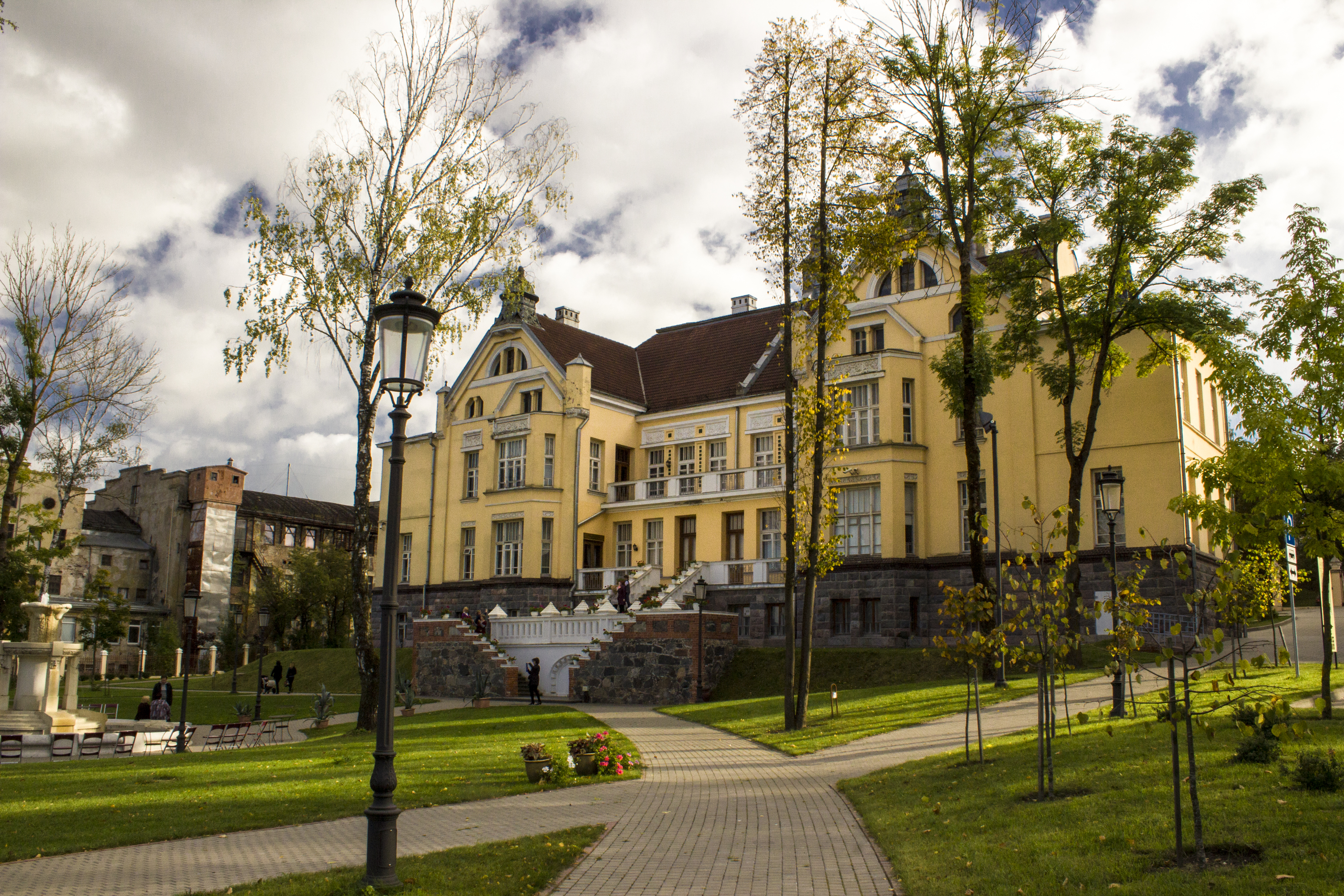
Chaimas Frenkelis Villa

The city was first mentioned in written sources as Soule in chronicles of the Livonian Order describing the Battle of Saule. Thus, the city's founding date is now considered to be 22 September 1236, the same date when the battle took place near Šiauliai. At first, Šiauliai was developed as a defence post against raids by the Teutonic and Livonian Orders. After the Battle of Grunwald in 1410, the raids stopped and Šiauliai developed as an agricultural settlement. In 1445, a wooden church was built. It was replaced in 1625 with the brick church that can be seen in the city center today.

Šiauliai was granted Magdeburg city rights in the 16th century when it also became an administrative centre of the area. However, in the 16th to 18th centuries, the city was devastated by the Deluge and epidemics of the Bubonic plague.

The credit for the city's rebirth goes to Antoni Tyzenhaus (1733–1785) who introduced reforms after a violent revolt of peasants of the Crown properties in Northern Lithuania (in Polish: Powstanie Szawelskie 1769). This refers to the Peasant uprising of 1769 against the Polish-Lithuanian introduction of economic reforms, which endeavoured to enforce serfdom and unpaid labour on the peasants. The uprising was finally quelled by both polish and Russian Forces which resulted in radical economic and urban reforms.

Antoni Tyzenhaus decided to rebuild the city according to Classicist ideas; at first, houses were built randomly in a radial shape, but were rebuilt in an orderly rectangular grid. Šiauliai grew to become a well-developed city, with several prominent brick buildings, like a post office, hotel, and court house. In 1791, Stanisław August Poniatowski, king of the Polish–Lithuanian Commonwealth, once again confirmed the city's rights and granted it a coat of arms. It depicted a bear, the symbol of Samogitia, the Eye of Providence, and a red bull, the symbol of the Poniatowski family. The modern coat of arms has been modelled after this version.

After the Partitions of Poland, Šiauliai received a new coat of arms. The city grew and became an important educational and cultural centre. Also, infrastructure was rapidly developing; in 1836–1858, a road connecting Riga and Tilsit was built, while in 1871, a railroad connecting Liepāja with Romny was built. Šiauliai, being at the crossroads of important merchant routes, started to develop as an industrial town. In 1897, it was the third-largest city in Lithuania, with a population of about 16,000. The demographics changed also; 56.4% of the inhabitants were Jewish in 1909.

=== World War I and independent Lithuania ===
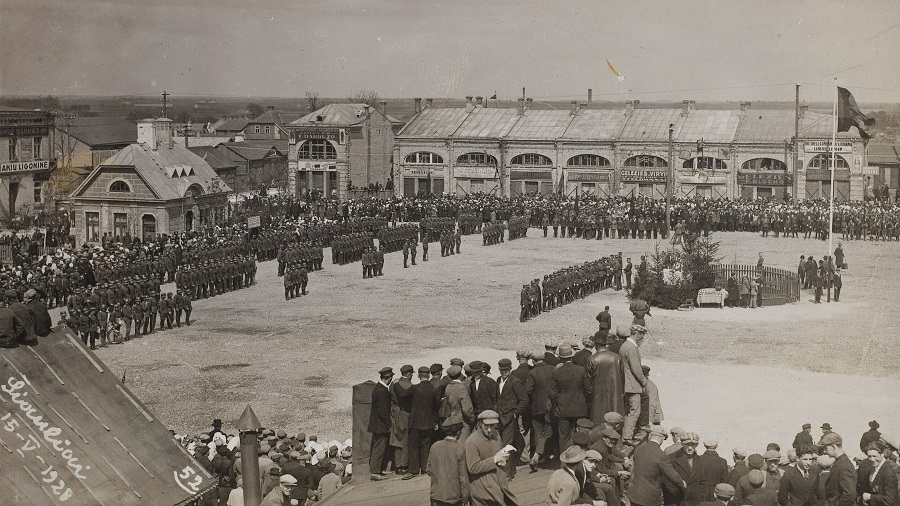
Parade of the Lithuanian Armed Forces in Šiauliai in 1928

During World War I, about 85% of the buildings were burned down and the city centre was destroyed. After the war and re-establishment of Lithuania, the importance of Šiauliai grew. Before Klaipėda was attached to Lithuania, the city was second after Kaunas by population size. By 1929, the city centre was rebuilt. Modern utilities were also included; streets were lit and there was public transportation, telephone and telegraph lines, a water supply network and a sewer.

The first years of independence were difficult because the industrial city lost its markets in Russia. It needed to find new clients in Western Europe. In 1932, a railroad to Klaipėda was built and it connected the city to the Western markets. In 1938, the city produced about 85% of Lithuania's leather, 60% of footwear, 75% of flax fibre, and 35% of candies. Culture also flourished: new periodicals such as the Šiaulių Metraštis, a prominent annual publication featuring articles about local history and culture, started.

=== World War II ===
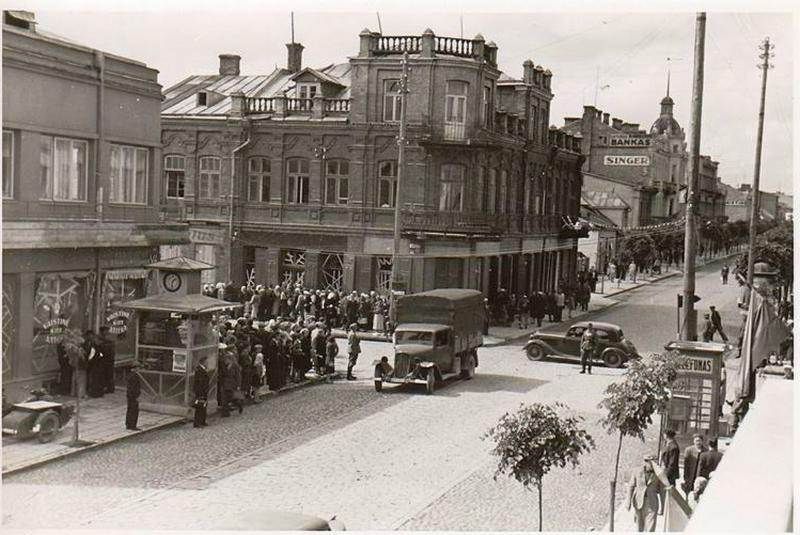
Soldiers of the Wehrmacht in Šiauliai in 1941

In 1939, one-fifth of the city's population was Jewish. German soldiers entered Šiauliai on June 26, 1941. The first mass murder of Šiauliai Jews was perpetrated in the Kužiai forest, about 12 kilometres outside Šiauliai, on June 29, 1941. According to one of the Jewish survivors of Šiauliai, Nesse Godin, some 700 people were shot in nearby woods during the first weeks of occupation after having been forced to dig their own graves. Beginning on July 29, 1941, and continuing throughout the summer, the Germans murdered about 8,000 Jews from Šiauliai and the Šiauliai region in the Kužiai forest. One hundred twenty-five Jews from Linkuva were also murdered there, along with ethnic Lithuanian and Russian members of the Communist Party and the Communist Youth.

The Šiauliai Ghetto was established in July 1941. There were two Jewish ghetto areas in Šiauliai, one in the Kaukas suburb, and one in Trakų. During World War II, the Jewish population was reduced from 8,000 to 500. Approximately 80% of the buildings were destroyed.

=== Soviet era ===
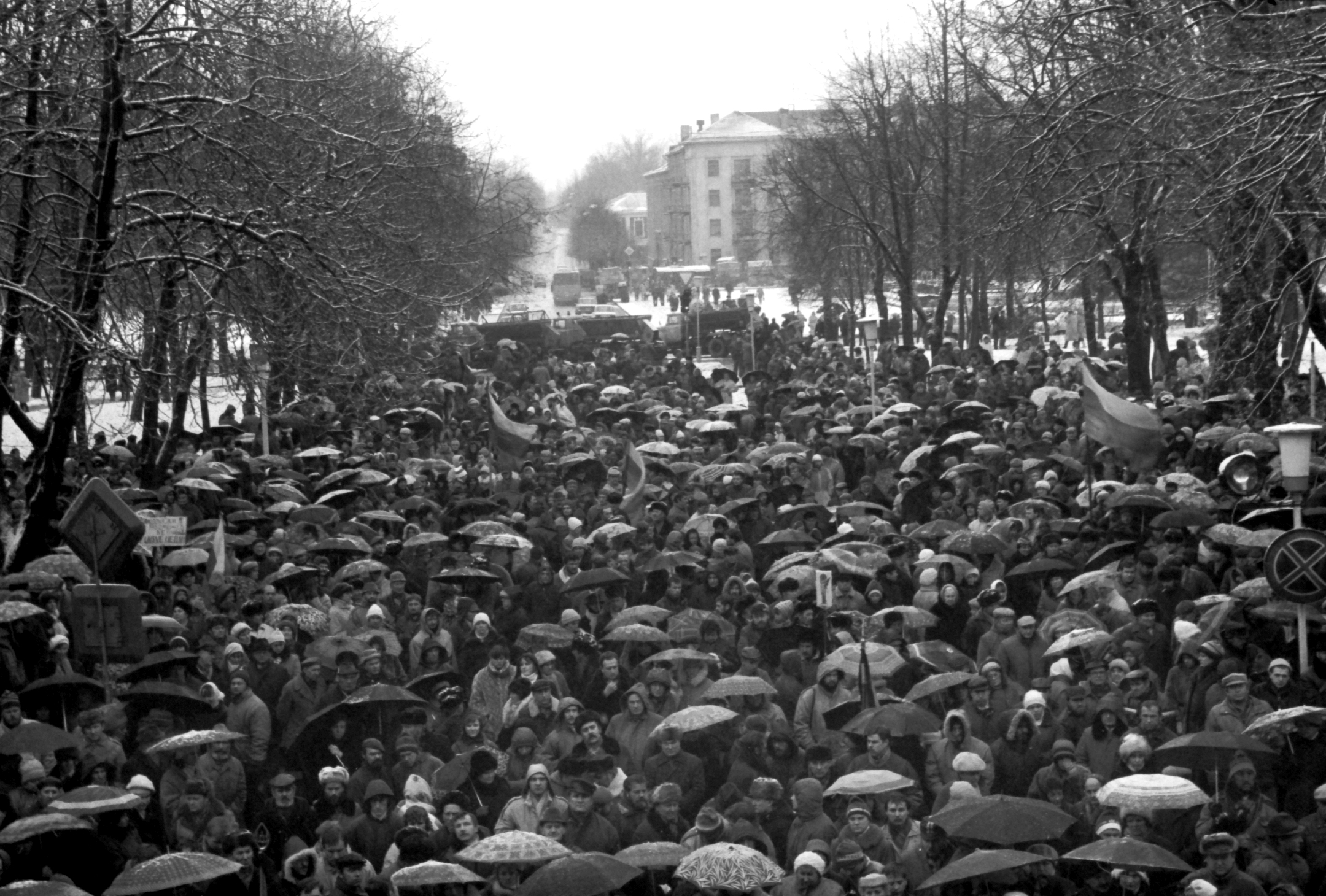
Šiauliai 13 January 1991, after the Soviet Army killed peaceful civilians during the January Events

The city was largely rebuilt anew in a typical Soviet fashion during the years of subsequent Soviet occupation.

== Politics ==
=== Mayors ===
The mayor of Šiauliai, officially the mayor of the municipality of the city of Šiauliai (Lithuanian: Šiaulių miesto savivaldybės meras), is the head of the Lithuanian municipality of the city of Šiauliai. The current incumbent is Artūras Visockas, who has been mayor since 2015.

- 1990–1991: Kazimieras Šavinis
- 1991–1995: Arvydas Salda
- 1995–2000: Alfredas Lankauskas
- 2000–2002: Vida Stasiūnaitė
- 2002–2003: Vaclovas Volkovas
- 2003–2007: Vytautas Juškus
- 2007–2011: Genadijus Mikšys
- 2011–2015: Justinas Sartauskas
- 2015–present: Artūras Visockas

== Geography ==
Šiauliai is located in the eastern part of the northern plateau, near the Mūša, Dubysa, and Venta rivers. There is a distance of 210 kilometres (130 miles) to get to Vilnius, 142 km (88 mi) to Kaunas, 161 km (100 mi) to Klaipėda, 128 km (80 mi) to Riga, and 250 km (155 mi) to Kaliningrad. The total city area is 81.13 square kilometres (31.32 sq mi), with the green areas making up 18.87 square kilometres (7.29 sq mi) and water covering 12.78 square kilometres (4.93 sq mi). Urban land outside the perimeter of the administrative 70,317 kilometres (43,693 miles).

Altitude: Lake Rėkyvos water level – 129.8 m (425.85 ft) above sea level, Talsos lake level – 103.0 m (337.93 ft) in the city center – 128.4 m (421.26 ft), Salduvės Hill – 149.7 m (491.14 ft) above sea level.

=== Water ===
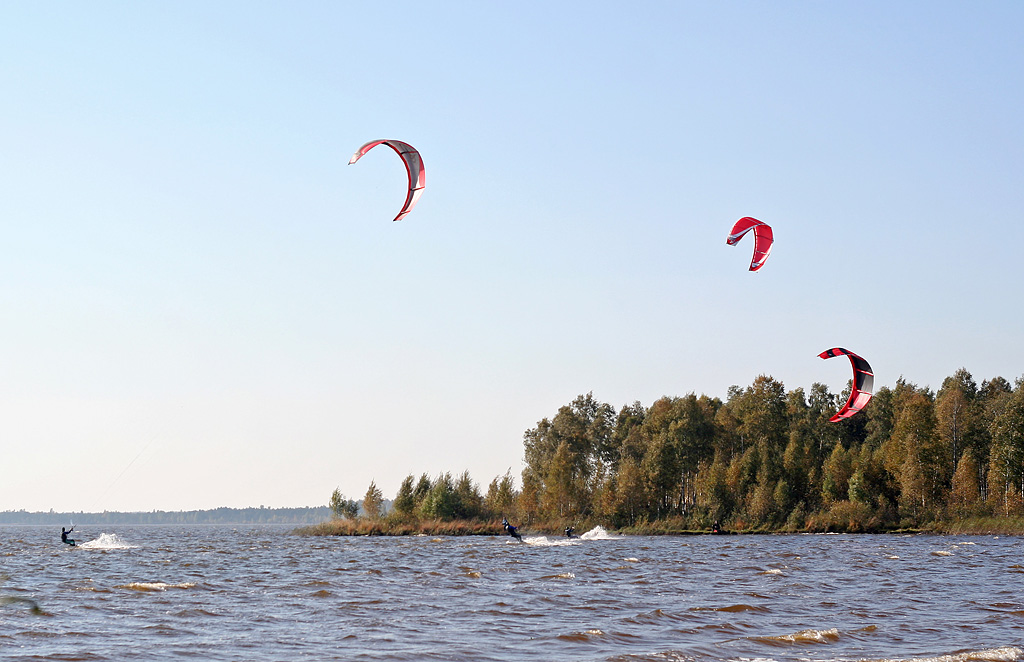
Kiteboarding on the Lake Rėkyva

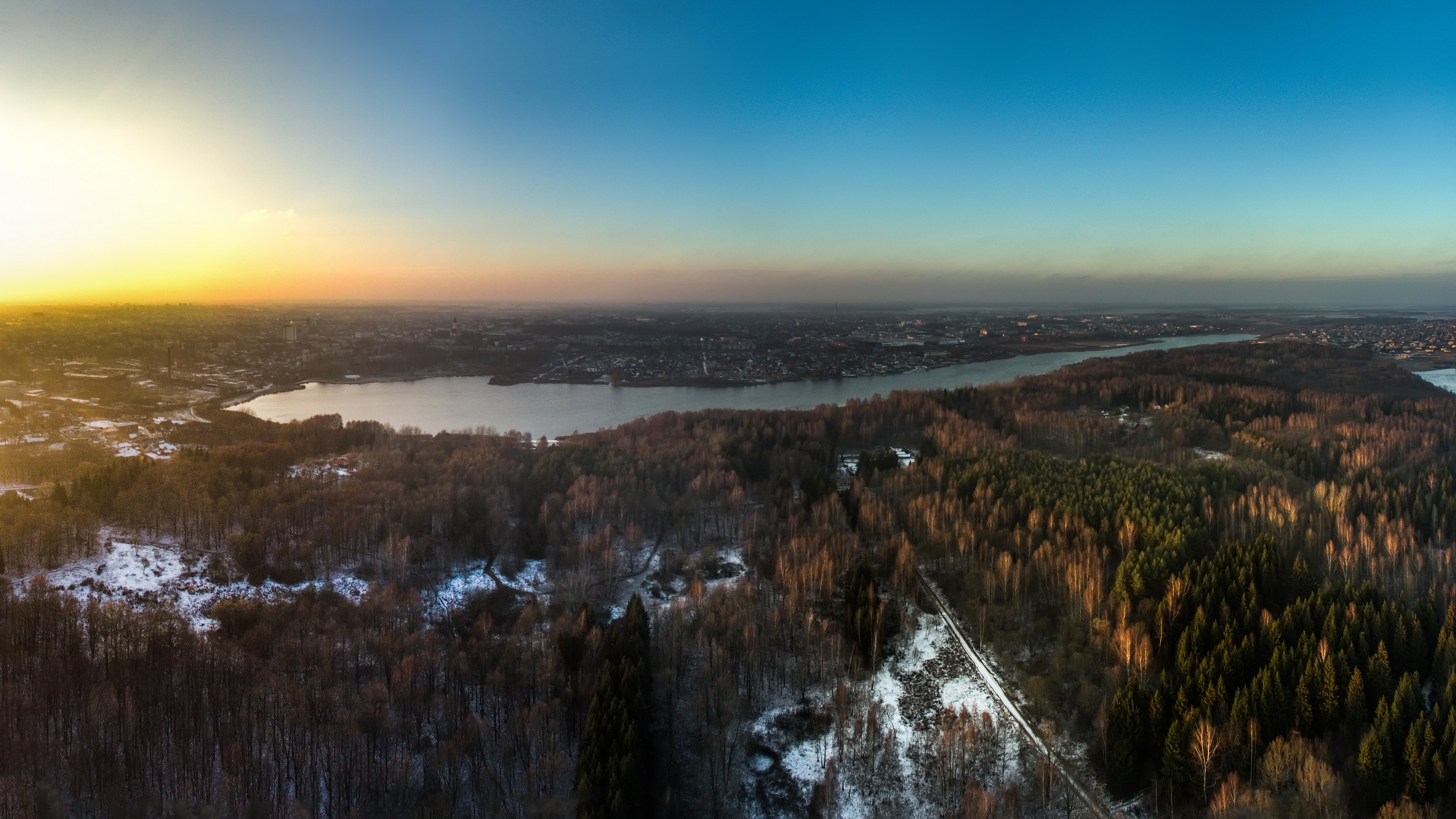
Lake Talkša in late autumn

The total water area – 1,280 ha, 15.7% in urban areas.

- Šiauliai Lakes
  - Lake Rėkyva, 1,179 ha
  - Lake Talkša, 56.2 ha
  - Lake Ginkūnai, 16.6 ha
- Rivers
  - Kulpė
  - Rūdė
  - Vijolė
  - Švedė
  - Šimša
  - Tilžė
  - Šventupis

=== Climate ===
Under the Köppen climate classification, Šiauliai has a warm-summer humid continental climate (Dfb). The average temperature in January; −3 °C (27 °F) in July; +18 °C (64 °F). The amount of precipitation in a year – 620 mm (24.4 in).

In 1942, the city recorded the lowest Lithuanian year mean temperature (+3.6 °C).

Climate data for Šiauliai (1991–2020 normals, extremes 1937-present)
Month	Jan	Feb	Mar	Apr	May	Jun	Jul	Aug	Sep	Oct	Nov	Dec	Year
Record high °C (°F)	10.5 (50.9)	13.3 (55.9)	21.0 (69.8)	26.6 (79.9)	30.4 (86.7)	32.1 (89.8)	35.0 (95.0)	35.7 (96.3)	30.1 (86.2)	23.3 (73.9)	16.9 (62.4)	13.4 (56.1)	35.7 (96.3)
Mean maximum °C (°F)	5.9 (42.6)	6.2 (43.2)	12.9 (55.2)	21.9 (71.4)	26.3 (79.3)	28.2 (82.8)	30.2 (86.4)	29.6 (85.3)	24.1 (75.4)	17.7 (63.9)	10.9 (51.6)	6.6 (43.9)	31.4 (88.5)
Mean daily maximum °C (°F)	−0.6 (30.9)	−0.1 (31.8)	4.7 (40.5)	12.3 (54.1)	18.1 (64.6)	21.3 (70.3)	23.7 (74.7)	23.0 (73.4)	17.5 (63.5)	10.6 (51.1)	4.6 (40.3)	0.9 (33.6)	11.4 (52.5)
Daily mean °C (°F)	−3.0 (26.6)	−2.8 (27.0)	0.7 (33.3)	6.9 (44.4)	12.4 (54.3)	15.9 (60.6)	18.3 (64.9)	17.5 (63.5)	12.6 (54.7)	7.0 (44.6)	2.4 (36.3)	−1.2 (29.8)	7.2 (45.0)
Mean daily minimum °C (°F)	−5.3 (22.5)	−5.4 (22.3)	−2.6 (27.3)	2.3 (36.1)	7.0 (44.6)	10.8 (51.4)	13.5 (56.3)	12.8 (55.0)	8.8 (47.8)	4.2 (39.6)	0.5 (32.9)	−3.1 (26.4)	3.6 (38.5)
Mean minimum °C (°F)	−17.3 (0.9)	−17.2 (1.0)	−11.0 (12.2)	−3.7 (25.3)	0.1 (32.2)	4.9 (40.8)	8.5 (47.3)	7.2 (45.0)	1.6 (34.9)	−3.0 (26.6)	−7.2 (19.0)	−12.7 (9.1)	−21.3 (−6.3)
Record low °C (°F)	−36.0 (−32.8)	−36.4 (−33.5)	−27.0 (−16.6)	−13.2 (8.2)	−3.5 (25.7)	0.1 (32.2)	5.2 (41.4)	2.1 (35.8)	−5.7 (21.7)	−8.5 (16.7)	−19.3 (−2.7)	−31.1 (−24.0)	−36.4 (−33.5)
Average precipitation mm (inches)	41 (1.6)	33 (1.3)	32 (1.3)	34 (1.3)	50 (2.0)	66 (2.6)	82 (3.2)	67 (2.6)	47 (1.9)	64 (2.5)	49 (1.9)	45 (1.8)	610 (24)
Average precipitation days	11.32	9.86	9.45	7.12	8.65	10.04	10.12	10.36	9.07	12.17	11.25	11.91	121.50
Average relative humidity (%)	88	85	78	70	68	71	74	76	81	85	90	90	80
Average dew point °C (°F)	−6 (21)	−6 (21)	−3 (27)	1 (34)	7 (45)	10 (50)	14 (57)	13 (55)	10 (50)	5 (41)	2 (36)	−2 (28)	4 (39)
Mean monthly sunshine hours	37.5	61.5	139.2	198.0	276.3	266.6	278.3	246.9	168.7	101.3	35.7	28.5	1,838.5
Source 1: Lithuanian Hydrometeorological Service, Météo Climat (average records high & low, precipitation days)
Source 2: NOAA (extremes), Time and Date (dewpoints, 2005-2015)

== Demographics ==
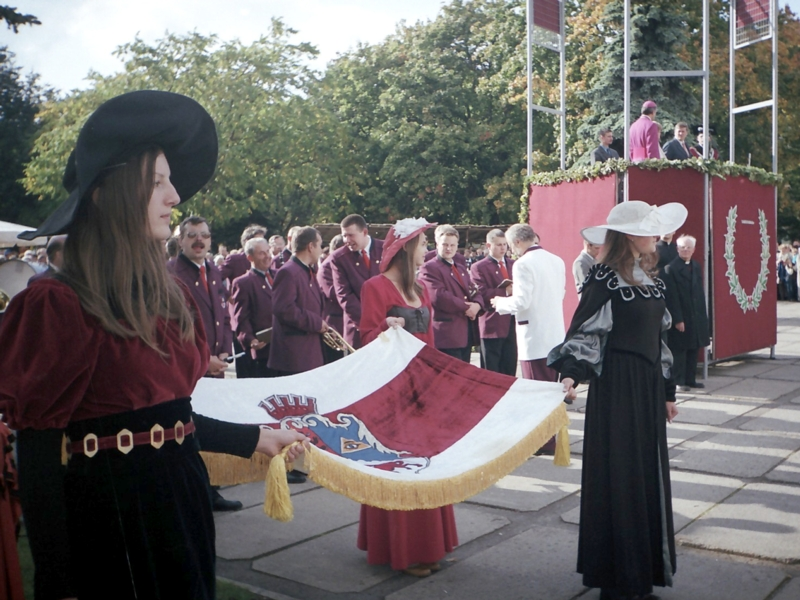
Participants of the Šiauliai Days

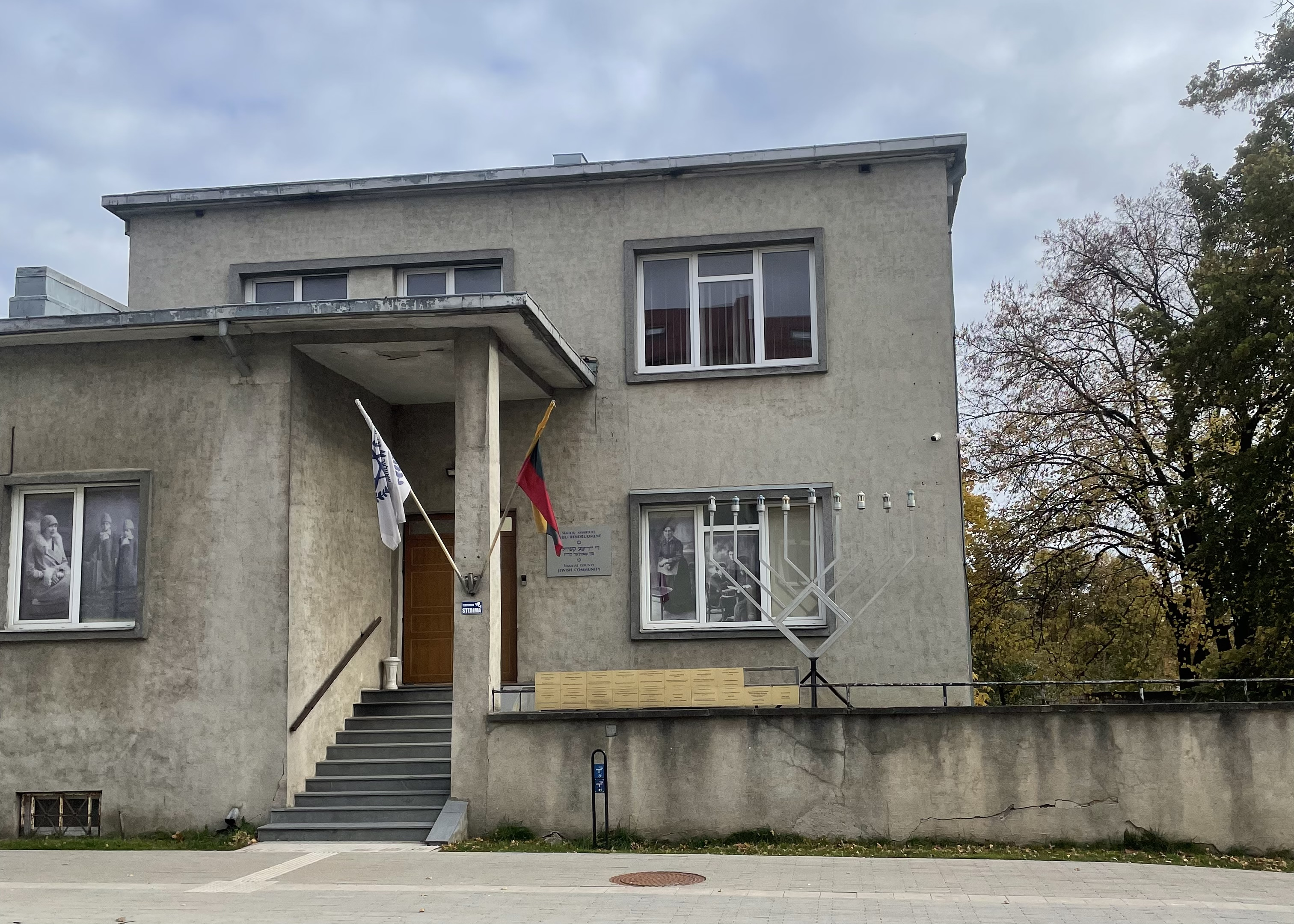
Jewish community center in Šiauliai

In 1795, there were 3,700 people living in Šiauliai, rising to 16,128 by 1897. The Jewish population of Šiauliai rose steadily through the second half of the nineteenth century, from 2,565 in 1847 to around 7,000 by the century's end. By the outbreak of World War I, 12,000 of the town's inhabitants were Jews, making Šiauliai majority Jewish. A battlefield during World War I, Šiauliai saw thousands of its Jewish citizens flee, never to return. In 1923, Šiauliai population's was third to that of Kaunas and Klaipėda.

According to the population census of 2001, ethnic Lithuanians comprise 93%, Russians – 5%, and the remaining 2% consist of Ukrainians, Belarusians, Jews, Roma, Latvians, Armenians, and other ethnic groups. About 94% of the city's population consider Lithuanian their native language, 5% are Russian speakers and the remainder speak Ukrainian, Belarusian, Latvian, Roma, Armenian etc. About 80% of those older than 20 have a command of the Russian language, while only 17% can speak English and 7% – German.

According to the 2021 census, the city population was 100,653 people, of which:

- Lithuanians – 94.12% (94,735)
- Russians – 3.15% (3,173)
- Ukrainians – 0.43% (436)
- Belarusians – 0.25% (249)
- Poles – 0.14% (138)
- Others / did not specify – 1.92% (1936)

== Economy ==
Shopping centre Saulės miestas

Beginning in the 19th century, Šiauliai became an industrial centre. During the Russian Empire period, the city had the largest leather factory in the whole empire, owned by Chaim Frenkel. Šiauliai contributed to around 85% of all leather production in Lithuania, 60% of the footwear industry, 75% of the flax fibre industry, and 35% of the candy industry.

During the Soviet years, the city produced electronics (Nuklonas), mechanical engineering, wood processing, construction industry. Most of the industrial enterprises were concentrated in urban areas.

According to 2005 data, the city has:

- Manufacturing and service companies – 3195
- Commercial enterprises – 781
- Shopping centres – 30, including
  - Akropolis, opened March 2009
  - Saulės Miestas, opened March 2007
  - Bruklinas, opened November 2007
  - Tilžė, opened February 2008
  - Arena, opened November 2007.

In 2020, construction of Europe's largest aircraft maintenance and repair centre began on the territory of Šiauliai International Airport. The related company repairs Airbus A320, Boeing 737 Classic, and Boeing 737 Next Generation aircraft and also provides aircraft administration and parking services. It is planned that the centre will create 1000 new jobs.

== Education ==
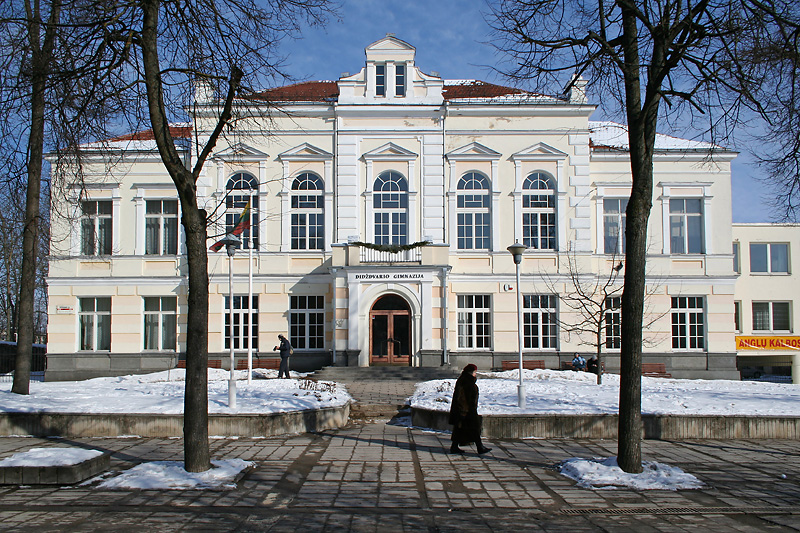
Didždvaris gymnasium

Šiauliai State College

- 1851 - Boys' Gymnasium (now Julius Janonis Gymnasium) was opened
- 1898 - Girls' Gymnasium (now Didždvaris Gymnasium) was opened
- 1920 - Jewish Gymnasium was opened
- 1920 - Šiauliai Teachers seminary was founded
- 1928 - Primary education became compulsory
- 1930 - Vincas Kudirka primary school was opened
- 1939 - The Institute of trade was moved from Klaipėda, it was the first Higher Education school in Šiauliai
- 1948 - Šiauliai Teachers Institute was founded. In 1954, it became the Pedagogical Institute, and since 1996, when the Šiauliai faculty of Kaunas Polytechnic Institute was connected, it is Šiauliai University. In 2021, Šiauliai University was reorganised to Vilnius University Šiauliai Academy.

Students in the city (in 2006):

- In Šiauliai Academy – 10,440
- In Šiauliai College – 2,770
- In Northern Lithuania College – 700
- In Šiauliai College of Management and Languages – 517
- In Šiauliai Conservatory – 149
- In Šiauliai Vocational Training Center – 2,663

There are 8 gymnasiums, 7 high schools, 16 secondary schools, 7 primary schools, 9 children's non-formal education schools, and 29 kindergartens. 21,000 students studied in general education schools in 2006.

In 2025, Šiauliai joined the UNESCO Global Network of Learning Cities.

== Transport ==
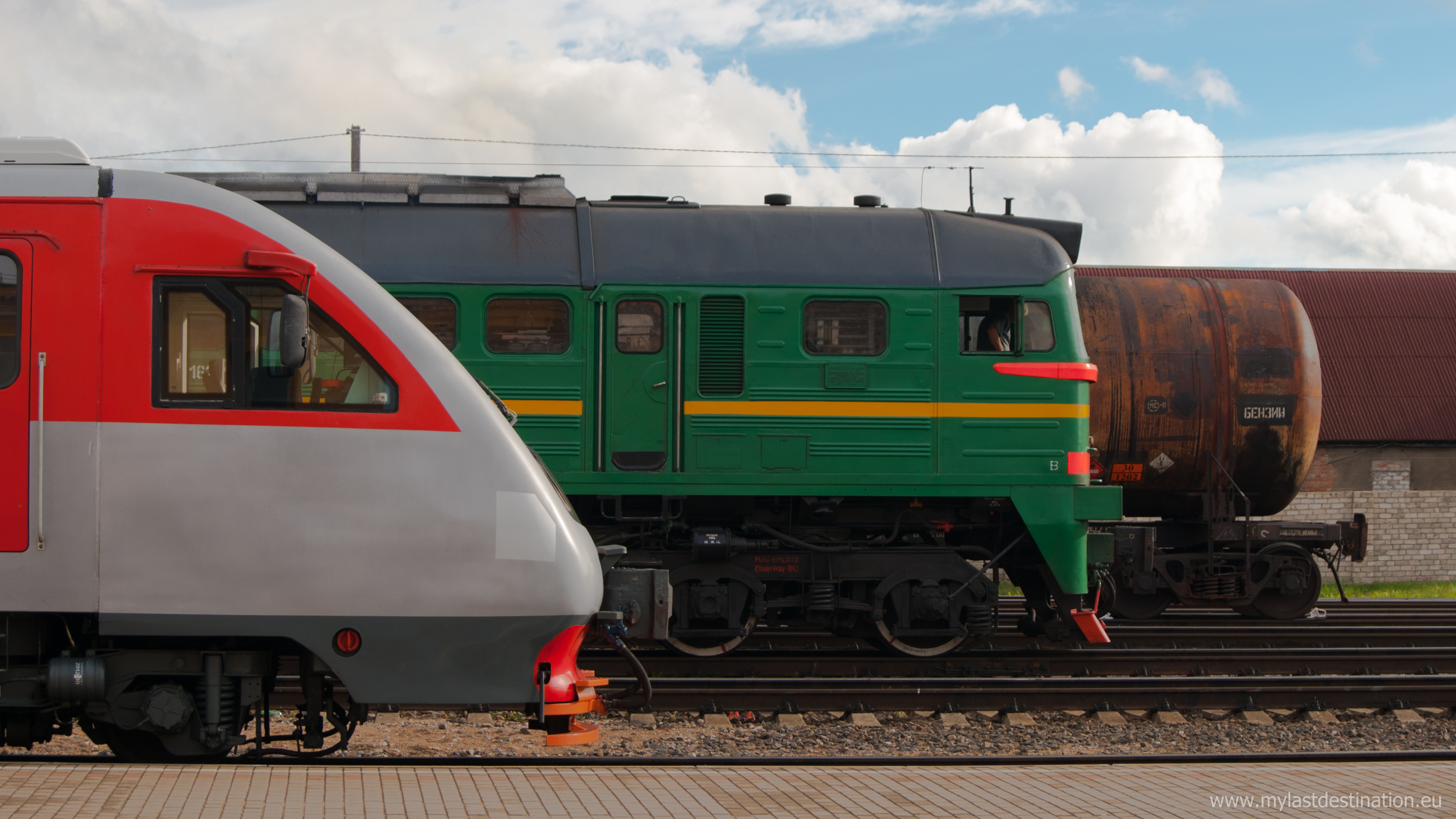
Trains in Šiauliai Train Station

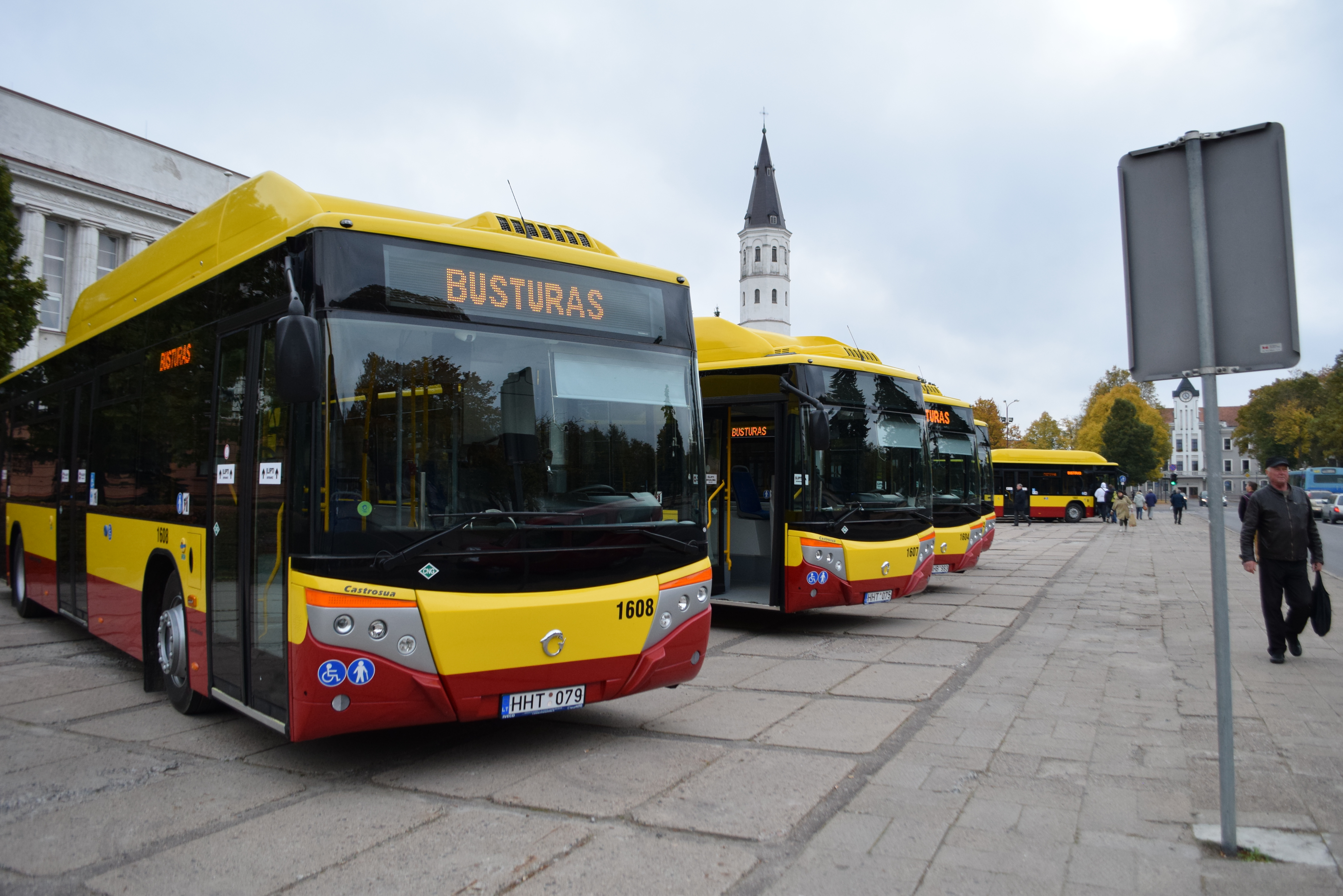
Public transport buses of Šiauliai

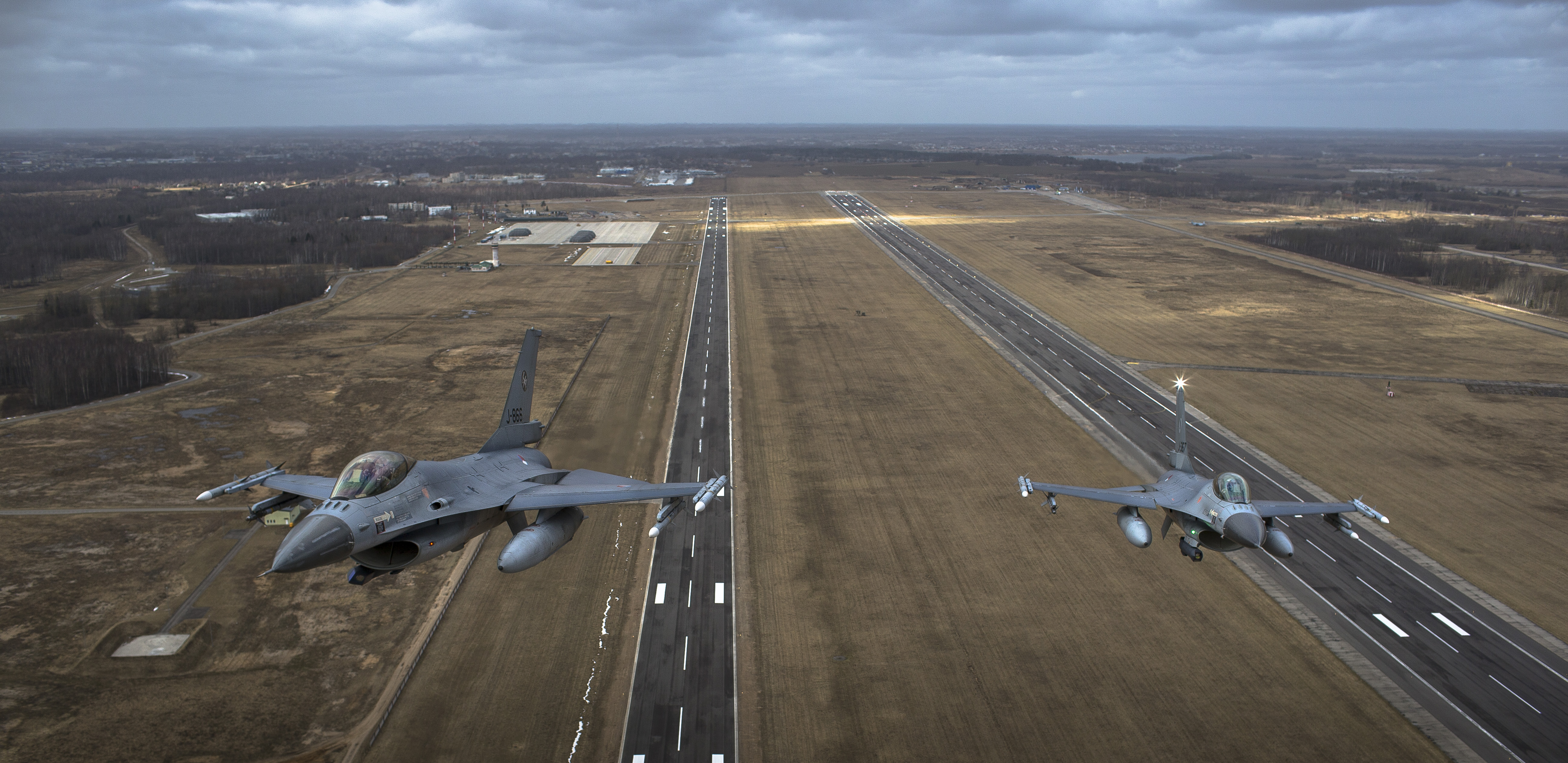
Royal Netherlands Air and Space Force's F-16 Fighting Falcons flying over the Šiauliai Air Base as a part of the Baltic Air Policing

The following highways pass through Šiauliai:

- A9 / E272 Šiauliai – Panevėžys (79 km)
- A11 / E272 Šiauliai – Palanga (147 km)
- A12 / E77 Riga – Šiauliai – Sovetsk (186 km).
- The city's western bypass, A18.

In 2006, Šiauliai had 297 km (185 mi) of roads, of which 32% had a gravel surface. The longest streets are Tilžės street, which is 9.72 km (6.04 mi) long, and Vilnius street, which is 5.67 km (3.52 mi) long, of which 1.28 km (0.80 mi) is a pedestrian boulevard.

=== Trains ===
The Tilžė–Riga and Šiauliai–Klaipėda railways were completed in 1916 and 1931, respectively. The city has a railway station.

As of 2026, the services calling at Šiauliai Railway Station are the following:

  - Vilnius–Klaipėda
  - Vilnius–Ryga
  - Šiauliai–Panevėžys
  - Kaunas–Šiauliai
  - Radviliškis–Klaipėda
  - Šiauliai–Mažeikiai

=== Air Transport ===
In 1930, an air strip was developed. It was expanded in 1961 during the Soviet period and developed into a large VVS base. It is now a military base for NATO, and home to the Šiauliai International Airport.

=== Buses ===
The first passenger transport company in Šiauliai, Autotrestas, was founded in 1940 and operated 29 buses. Since 1955, Šiauliai bus and taxi operations were managed by one single entity, but in 1972, bus and taxi operations within the city were restructured to establish the dedicated Šiauliai Bus Depot. Since 1995, the bus operations have been managed by Busturas, UAB. As of 2026, the operator provides 37 urban and six feeder services.

Regional, national, and international services are calling or terminating at Šiauliai Bus Station (Tilžės g. 107) by the shopping mall Saulės miestas. The combined shopping mall and bus station complex opened in 2007.

== Sport ==
Šiauliai Arena

The most popular sports in the city are rugby, basketball, football, athletics, and cycling. The local rugby clubs Vairas and Baltrex are multi-time Lithuanian champions and are the main academies of Lithuanian rugby players.

BC Šiauliai, a basketball club established in 1984, has won seven consecutive Lithuanian Basketball League bronze medals sets between 2004–2010 and three consecutive Baltic Basketball League Elite Division titles between 2014–2016.

On July 25, 2007, to host the 37th men's European Basketball Championship, a modern Šiauliai Arena was opened to the public.

Club	Sport	League	Venue
BC Šiauliai	Basketball	Lithuanian Basketball League (LKL), Baltic Basketball League (BBL), Eurocup	Šiauliai Arena
FA Šiauliai	Football	The A League A Lyga	Savivaldybės Stadium
ABRO- Saulė	Basketball		Šiaulių sporto rūmai
RK Šiauliai	Handball	Lithuanian Handball League (LRL)	Šiaulių sporto rūmai
RK Vairas	Rugby union	Lithuanian Rugby Championship	Zoknių stadionas
RK Baltrex	Rugby union		Talšos stadionas
RK Šiauliai	Rugby union		Talšos stadionas

== Twin towns and sister cities ==
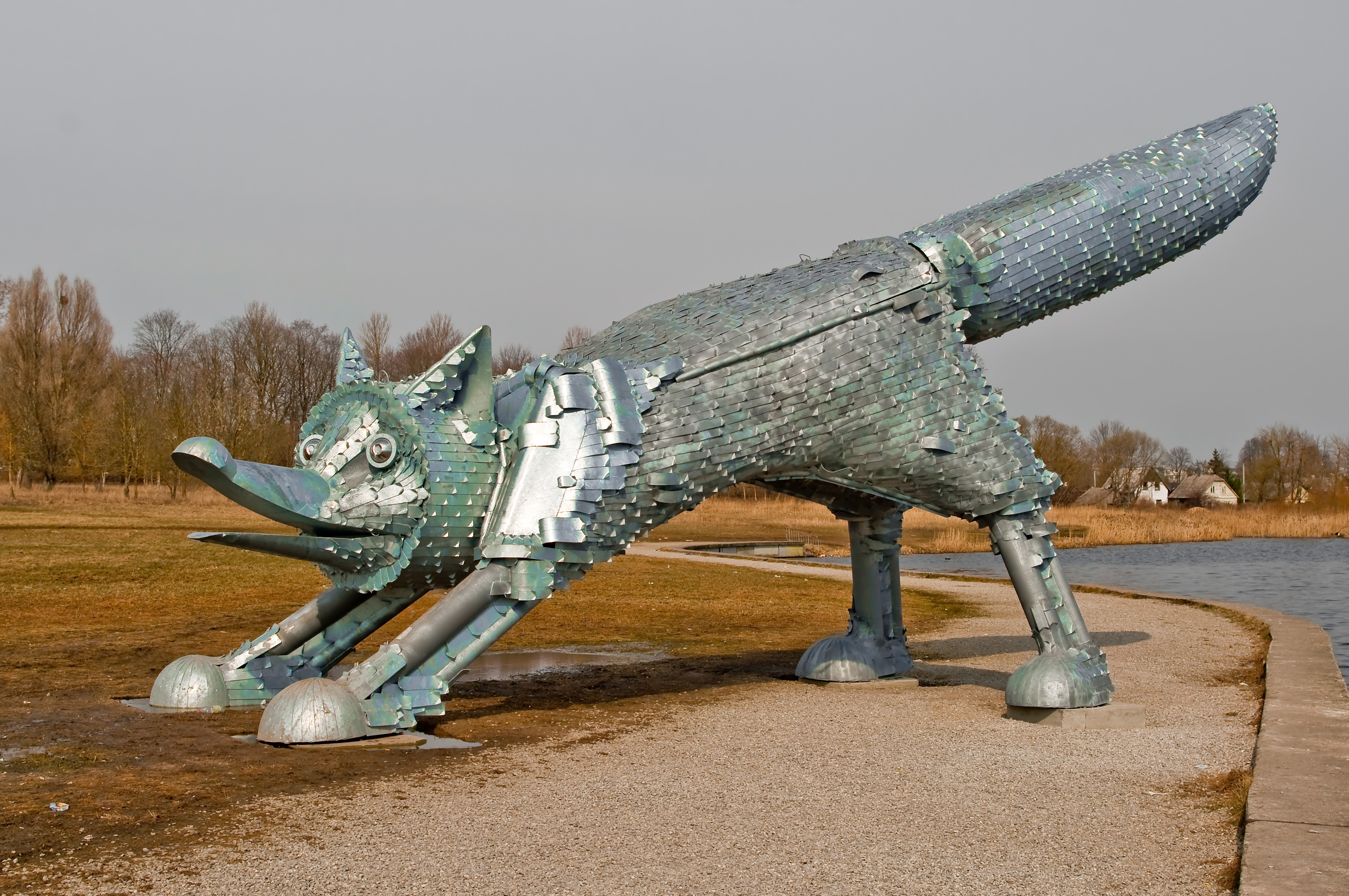
Iron Fox

Šiauliai is twinned with:

- Częstochowa, Poland
- Etten-Leur, Netherlands
- Fredericia, Denmark
- Jelgava, Latvia
- Khmelnytsky, Ukraine
- Kristianstad, Sweden
- Omaha, United States
- Pärnu, Estonia
- Plauen, Germany

The city was previously twinned with:

- Baranavichy, Belarus
- Kaliningrad, Russia

== Notable people ==
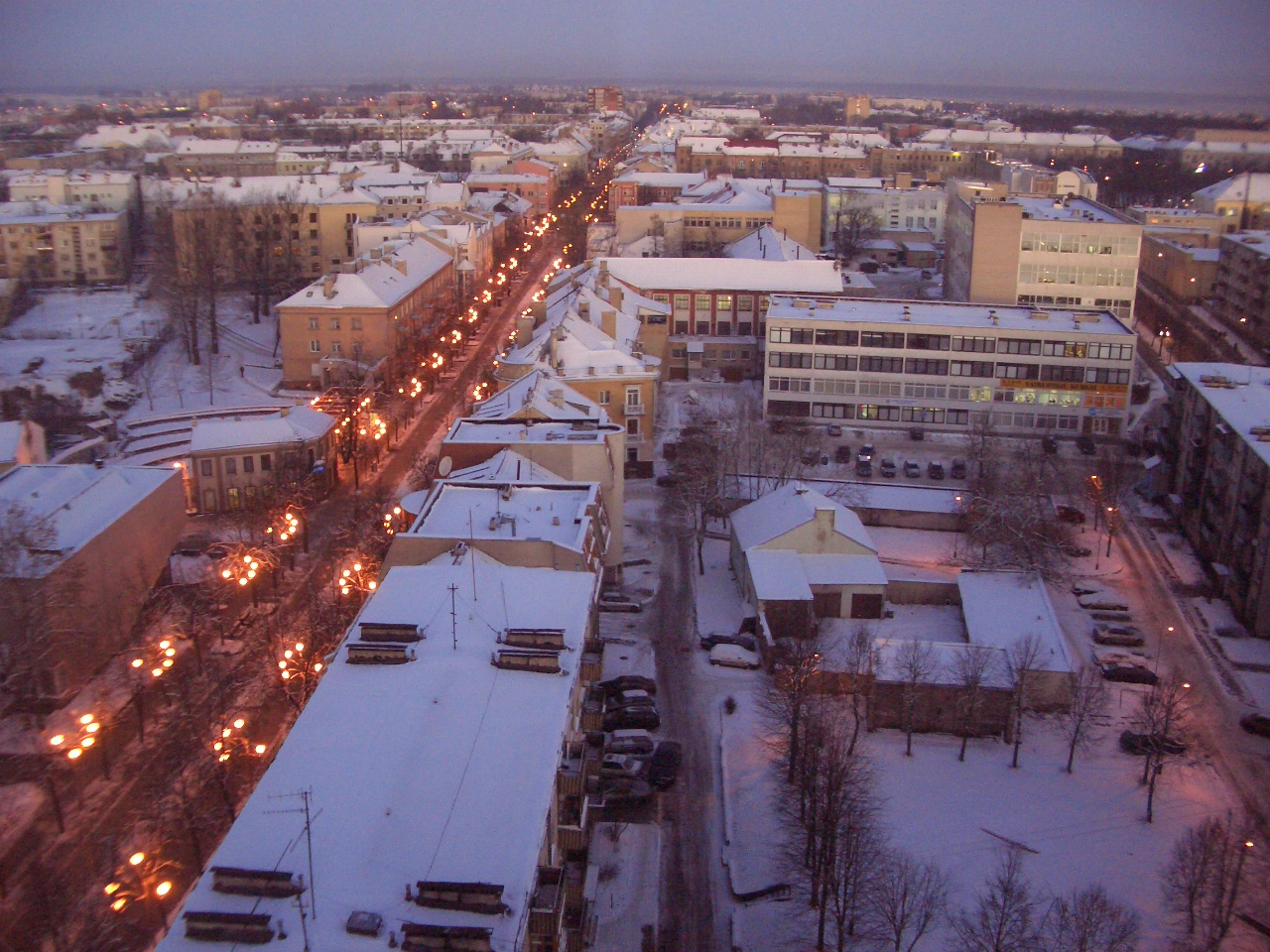
View of Šiauliai

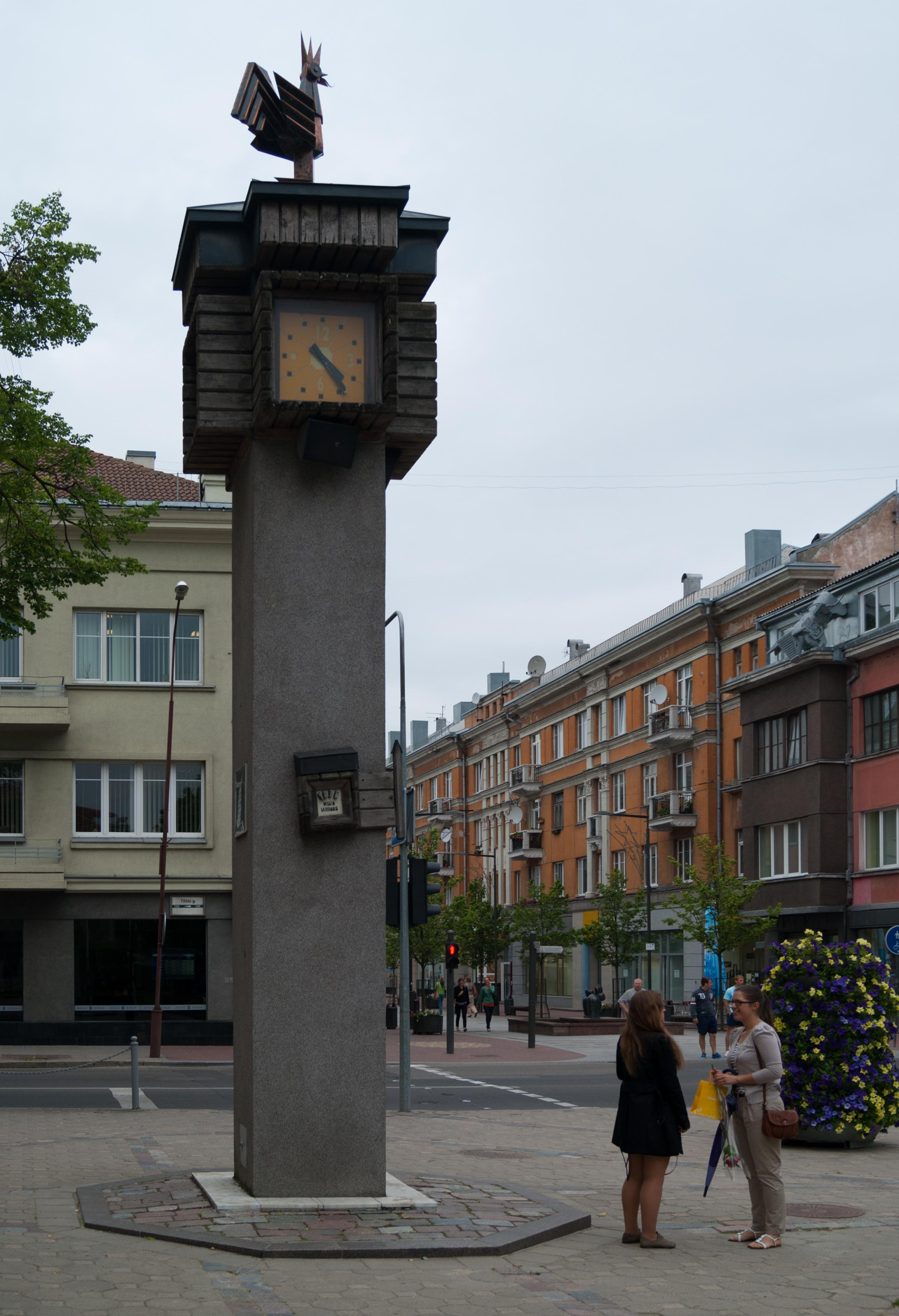
Šiauliai Cockerel Love Clock is a popular meeting and dating place

People who were born in or near Šiauliai include:

- Albrycht Stanisław Radziwiłł (1593–1656), magnate, noble, duke, politician and Starosta (city foreman).
- Benjamin Kagan (1869–1953), mathematician specializing in geometry
- Abraham B. Rhine (1877–1941), American rabbi
- Ivan Luckievič (1881–1919), archaeologist, publicised Belarusian independence movement
- Tobias Dantzig (1884–1956), American mathematician and author.
- Anton Luckievič (1884–1942), Belarusian publisher, journalist and politician; Prime Minister of the Belarusian People's Republic in 1918.
- André Andrejew (1887-1967), a Russian and French movie art director
- Jacob Gens (1903–1943), self-proclaimed police commander in Vilnius Ghetto, 1941–1943
- Meyer Schapiro (1904–1996), art historian
- Yosef Shalom Elyashiv, (1910–2012), a Haredi (ultra-Orthodox) Jewish rabbi
- Olegas Truchanas (1923–1972), conservationist and nature photographer.
- Ligia B. Bieliukas (1923–1966), WWII underground member, clubwoman
- Nesse Godin (1928–2024), Holocaust survivor, awareness advocate in the USA.
- Virgilijus Noreika (1935–2018), an opera singer
- Regimantas Adomaitis (1937–2022), film and stage actor
- Šarūnas Bartas (born 1964), film director
- Olga Jegunova (born 1984), classical pianist, now lives in Paris

=== Sport ===
- Antanas Sireika (born 1956), born near Šiauliai coach for a hometown basketball team.
- Mindaugas Žukauskas (born 1975), professional basketball player
- Robertas Javtokas (born 1980), professional basketball player
- Marius Žaromskis (born 1980), mixed martial artist fighter
- Dovilė Dzindzaletaitė (born 1993), athlete, triple jumper.

== Depictions in popular culture ==
- Šiauliai is one of the starting towns of Lithuania in the turn-based strategy game Medieval II: Total War: Kingdoms.
- The Pietinis residential district is the setting of the 2016 novel Pietinia Kronikas by Rimantas Kmita. The novel has been adapted into a 2024 coming-of-age drama film The Southern Chronicles by Ignas Miškinis. The film has become one of the highest-grossing Lithuanian productions.

== See also ==
- BC Šiauliai
- Hill of Crosses
- Šiauliai Air Base
- Šiauliai Ghetto
