= Artūras Visockas =

Mayor of Šiauliai
- Incumbent
- Assumed office 23 March 2015
- President: Gitanas Nausėda
- Deputy: Justinas Švėgžda
- Preceded by: Justinas Sartauskas

Member of the Šiauliai City Municipality Council
- In office 27 February 2011 – 22 March 2015

Personal details
- Born: 19 January 1968 (age 58) Šiauliai, Lithuania
- Party: Independent
- Spouse: Edita Visockienė
- Children: Matas Visockas, Ugnius Visockas
- Education: Vilnius University Šiauliai Academy
- Occupation: Mayor of Šiauliai, politician, businessman

Artūras Visockas (Lithuanian: [/ɐrˈtuː.rɐs vɪˈsɔt͡s.kɐs/]; born 19 January 1968) is a businessman, athlete, who is currently serving as mayor of Šiauliai city since 2015, political and public figure of Lithuania and Šiauliai city municipality.

== Education and early career ==
Visockas graduated from Šiaulių 10-oji Vidurinė Mokykla in 1986 and later obtained a degree from the Šiaulių Pedagoginis Institutas in 1993. From 2004 to 2015, he served as the director of "Foto202," a photography business.

== Political career ==
Visockas began his political career in 2011, running as an independent candidate for the Šiauliai City Municipality Council. He received 2,718 votes and secured a seat on the council. In 2015, he was elected Mayor of Šiauliai, a position he has held since, being re-elected in 2023 for a third term.

== Sporting achievements ==
An avid orienteering sports enthusiast, Visockas founded the Orienteering Club "Sakas" and was an active member until 2013. He has been a member of the "Igtisa" sports club since 2014 and has won numerous orienteering competitions.

A dedicated community organizer, Visockas was one of the initiators of the "Darom" environmental cleanup campaigns. Before becoming mayor, he personally funded the maintenance of public spaces such as Salduvės Park, the shores of Talkša Lake, and the central city park of Šiauliai.

== Awards ==
- 2005: Winner of the "Lietuvos Garbė" ("Honor of Lithuania") award in the "Neighbor of the Year" category by TV3 News.
- 2006: Recipient of the "Gerumo Sparnas" ("Wing of Kindness") award during the LNK charity telethon "Gerumo Diena" for supporting children in foster care.
- 2011: Named the "Most Popular Šiauliai Resident of 2011" by readers of the newspaper Šiaulių Naujienos.
