= Lake Rėkyva =

Lake in Lithuania

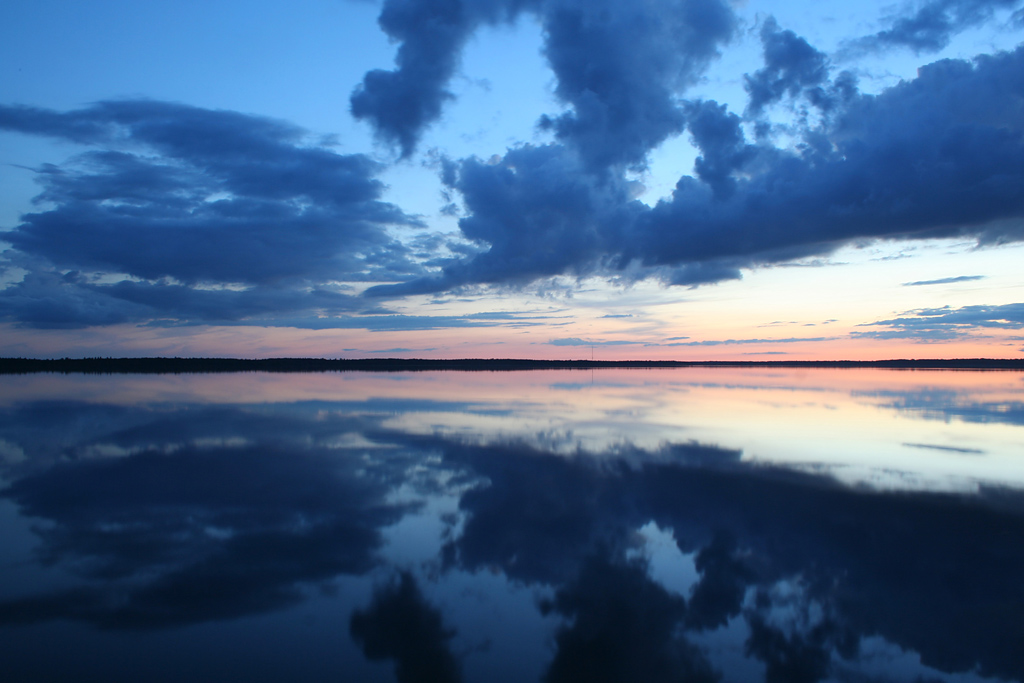

- Location within Lithuania
- Location: Šiauliai, Lithuania
- Coordinates: 55°51′55″N 23°18′10″E
- Type: Lake
- Basin countries: Lithuania
- Surface area: 1,196.8 ha (2,957 acres)
- Average depth: 2 m (6 ft 7 in)
- Max. depth: 4.8 m (16 ft)
- Shore length^{1}: 4.7 km (2.9 mi)
- ^{1} Shore length is not a well-defined measure.

The Lake Rėkyva (Lithuanian: Rėkyvos ežeras) is a lake on the southern edge of the city of Šiauliai in Lithuania. The lake is named after Rėkyva, which is a southern part of the city of Šiauliai. The lake's western and south-western shores are declared the Rėkyva Botanical Zoological Reserve. It is one of the largest lakes in Lithuania (10th) and the largest watershed lake in Lithuania.

The lake is popular among fishing, kiteboarding and windsurfing enthusiasts, and by other visitors for recreational purposes as it has sandy beaches and a pier. The Lithuanian holiday Joninės is celebrated annually near the lake. Moreover, two yacht clubs are located on the shores of the lake.

== Gallery ==
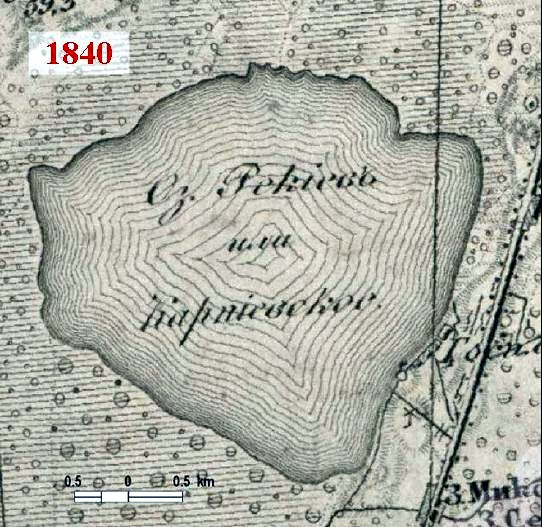
The lake as depicted in a map dating to 1840

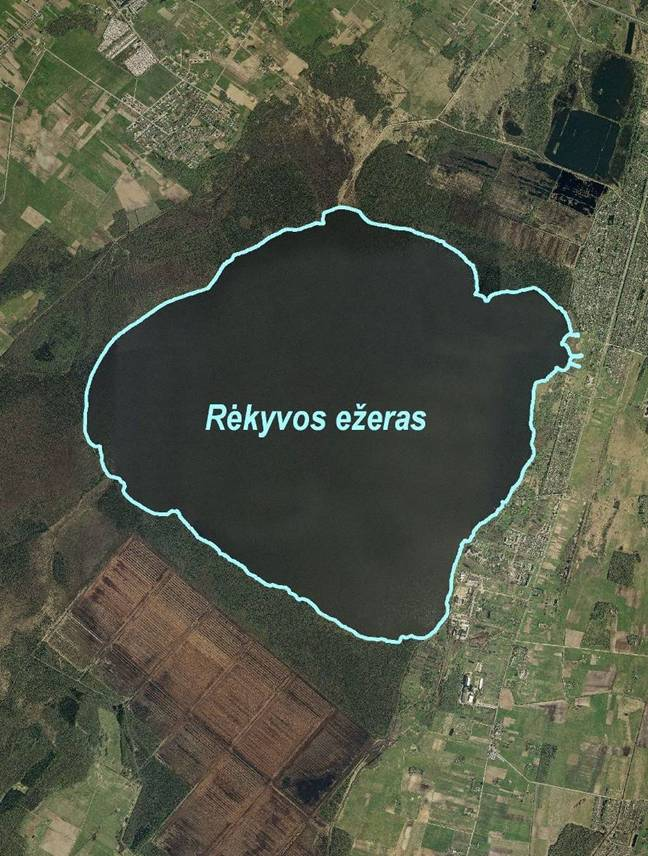
Aerial view of the lake

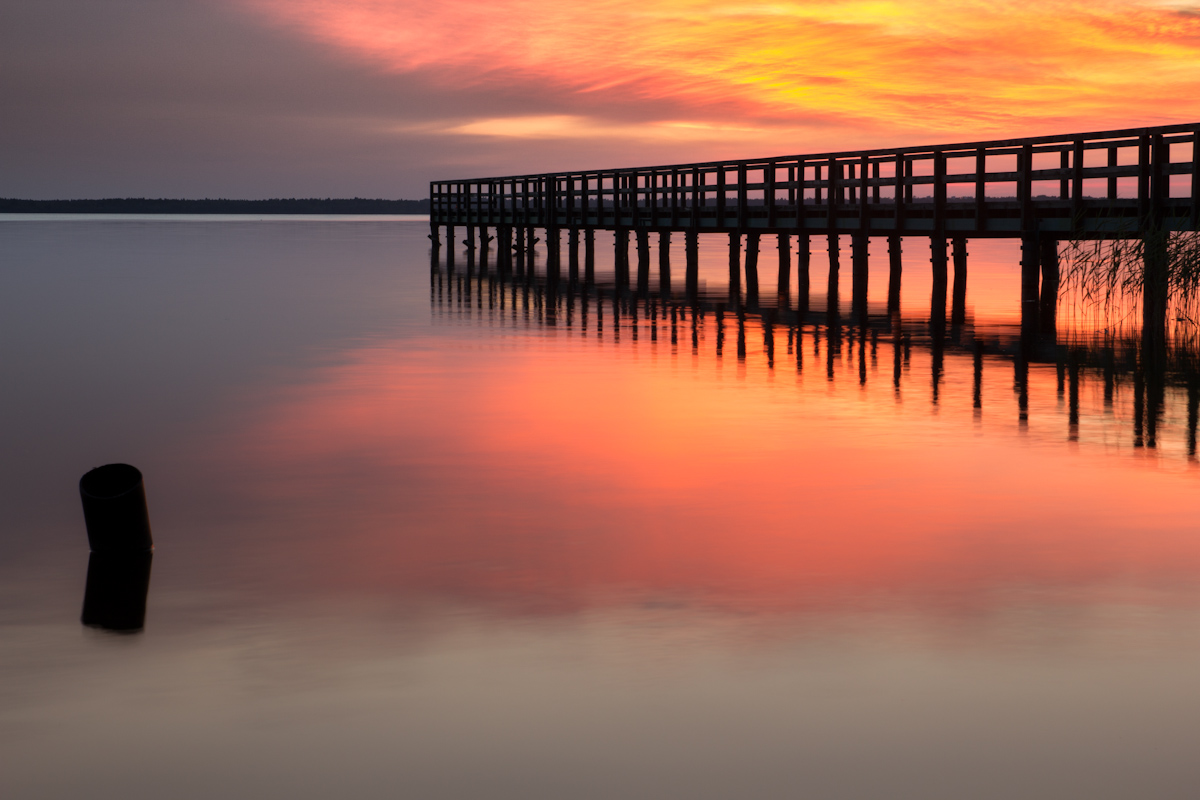
Pier of the lake

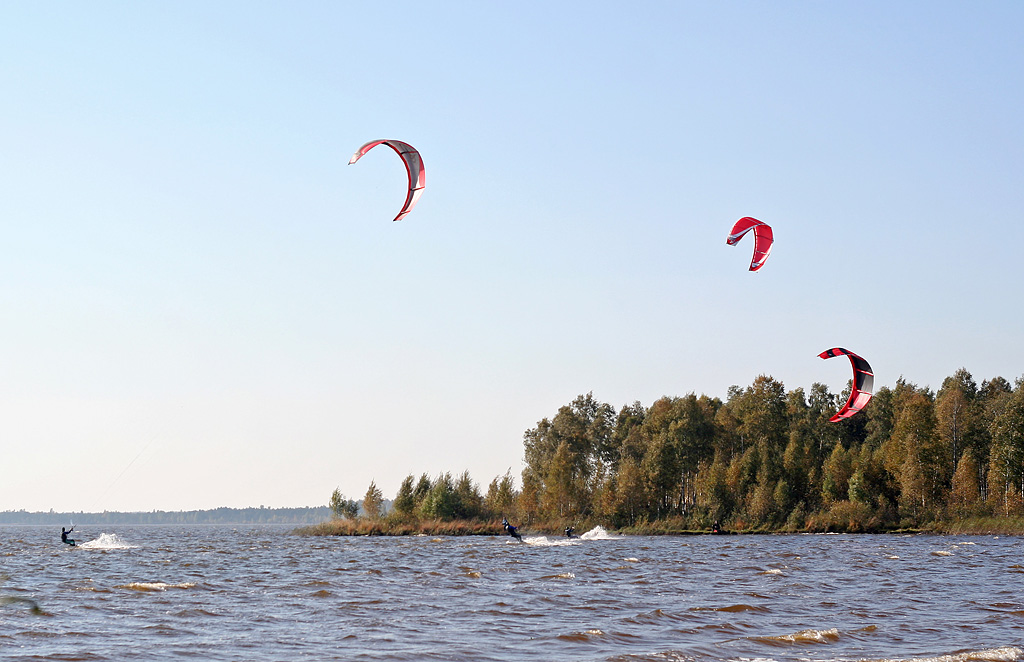
Kiteboarding on the lake
