= Nesse Godin =

Lithuanian and American Holocaust survivor (1928–2024)

Nesse Godin (Galperin) (28 March 1928 – 5 March 2024) was a Lithuanian and American Holocaust survivor. Godin dedicated her life to informing and teaching others about the Holocaust.

== Early years ==
Godin was born in Šiauliai, Lithuania on 28 March 1928.

=== 1933–1939 ===
Godin stated that her life before the war was normal, remarking:

"My family was very religious and observed all the Jewish laws. I attended Hebrew school and was raised in a loving household where the values of community and caring were always stressed. After the Germans invaded Poland in 1939, we heard from relatives in Łódź that Jews there were being treated horribly. We could not believe it; how could your neighbors denounce you and not stand up to help you?"

When asked why she did not pretend to be German, she recognized she could have, but her neighbor revealed her as a Jew.

=== 1945–1950 ===
From Stutthof, Godin was transported to several camps and was sent on a death camp in January 1945. Many prisoners died due to the cold winter weather and inadequate nourishment. On 10 March 1945, she was liberated by Soviet troops. As she was still a young child, she was assigned to a random guardian but soon reunited with her mother. Her mother did not recognize her, as it had been three years, and Godin's hair was shaved to treat lice.

In 1950, after five years in a displaced person camp in Feldafing, Germany, Godin and her husband Jack (also a survivor), along with their two children, Pnina and Edward, moved to the United States and settled in Washington, D.C. metropolitan area.

== Later years ==
In 1954 Godin and Jack gave birth to their last child, Rochelle. They supported their children and Godin's mother, Sara, with blue-collar jobs.

Godin had seven grandchildren and two great-grandchildren. Jack died on 3 September 2015.

=== Advocacy/Awareness speaking and volunteering ===
For over 40 years, Godin appeared before audiences to speak about the Holocaust to domestic and international audiences. Organizations and groups she spoke with include the United States Naval Academy, United States Military Academy, Department of Defense, Department of Energy, United Nations General Assembly, numerous schools, universities, churches, synagogues, and civic groups.

Godin was a founding member and on boards of several Holocaust Survivor groups. She served on the Jewish Federation of Greater Washington board and was a board member of the Anti-Defamation League, Jewish Community Council of Greater Washington, and other organizations. Godin was co-president of the Jewish Holocaust Survivors and Friends of Greater Washington and served as a speaker for the Capitol Children's Museum of Washington, D.C.

Godin earned numerous awards and honors.

Regarding why she volunteered, Godin stated:

"As you know I was a prisoner from the age of 13 to 17. I lived through a ghetto, a concentration camp, four labor camps, and a death march. I was not strong, I was not smart, and I was a little girl. I think that I survived the Holocaust by the grace of the Lord above and by the kindness of Jewish women that gave me a bite of bread, wrapped my body in straw to keep me warm, held me up when I was hurt by the guards, gave me hope, but also asked me to promise them that if I survived I would not let them be forgotten. Remember and tell the world what hatred can do. I feel that the USHMM is fulfilling the promise that I made to those women who did not survive. I am proud to be a devoted volunteer in our most wonderful institution of education as I call our USHMM."

Godin died in Washington D.C. on 5 March 2024, at the age of 95.
