= Kužiai =

- Town
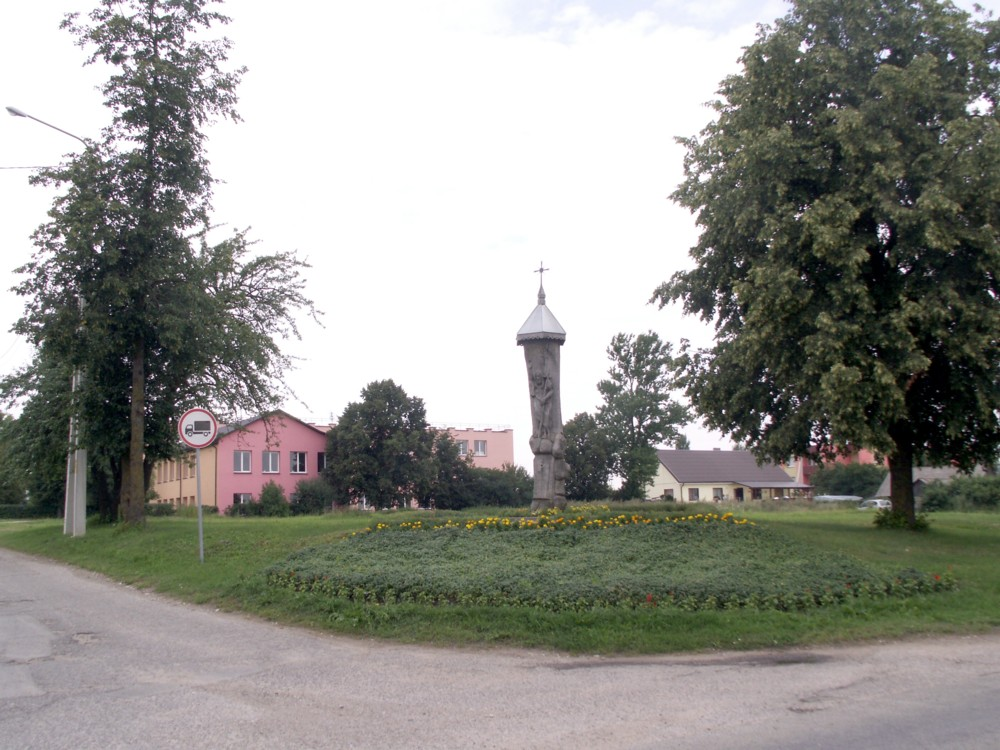

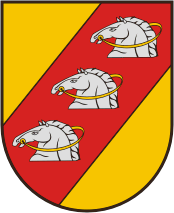
- Coat of arms

- Location in Lithuania
- Coordinates: 55°59′50″N 23°8′40″E
- Country: Lithuania
- Ethnographic region: Samogitia
- County: Šiauliai County

Population (2011)
  - Total: 1,168
- Time zone: UTC+2 (EET)
  - Summer (DST): UTC+3 (EEST)

Kužiai is a small town in Šiauliai County in northern-central Lithuania. As of 2011 it had a population of 1,168.

== Gallery ==
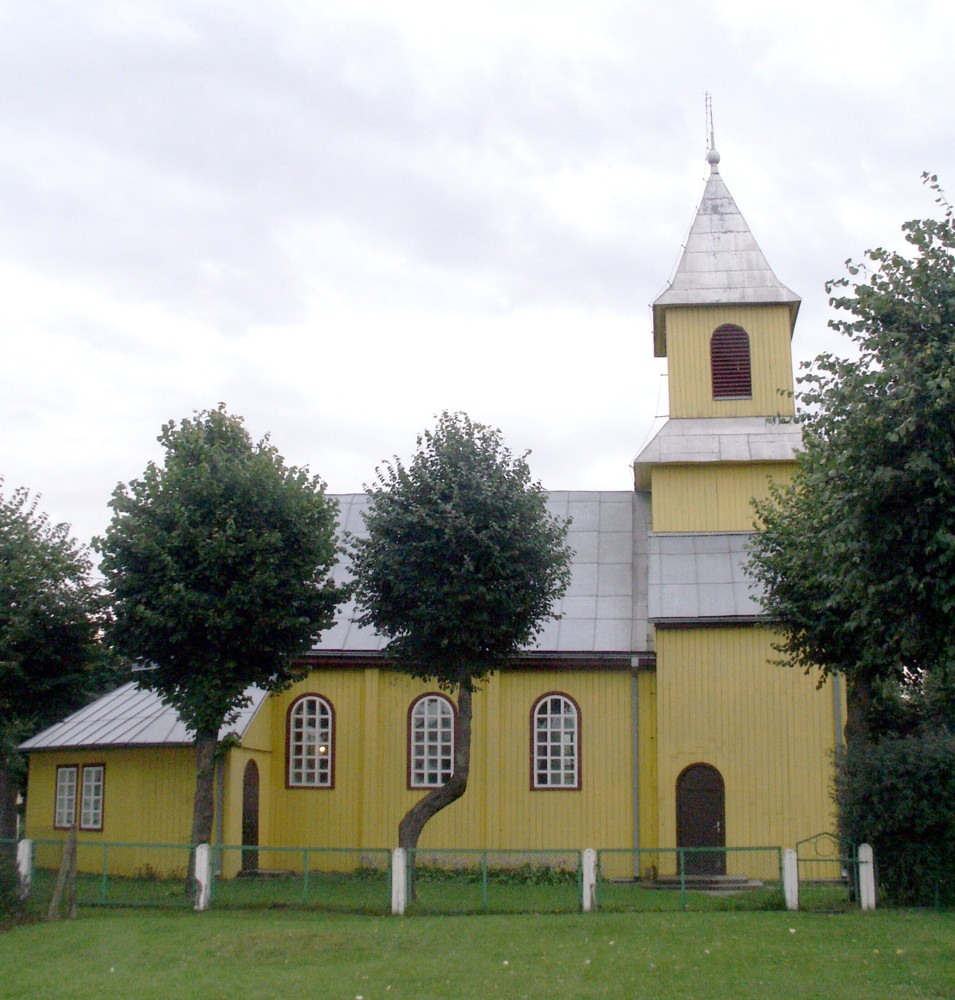
Western facade of the church

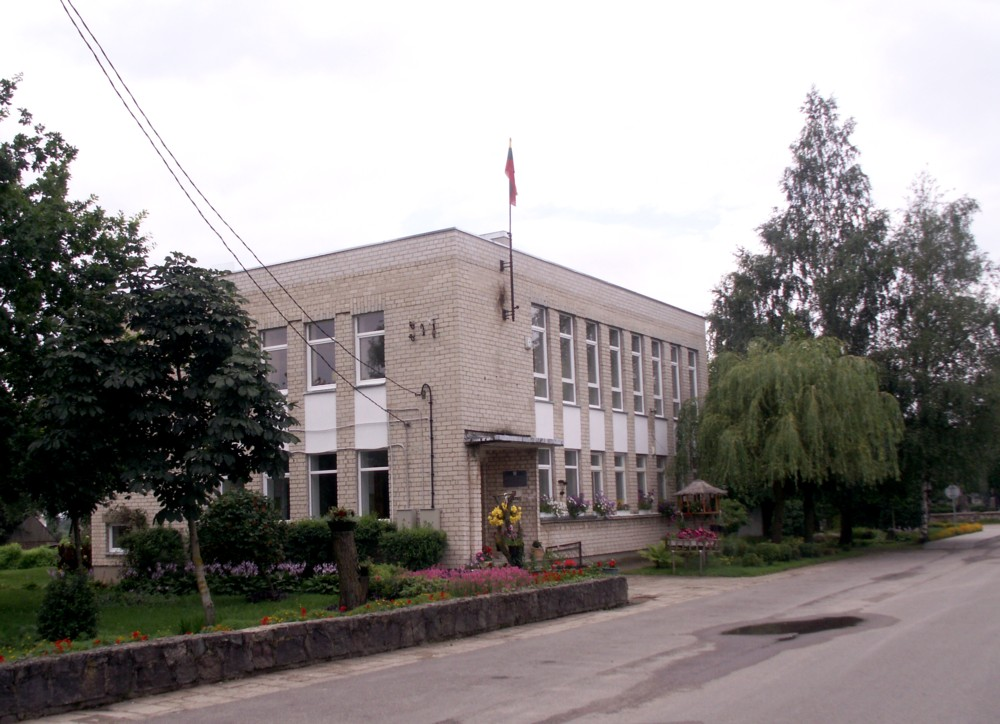
Parish

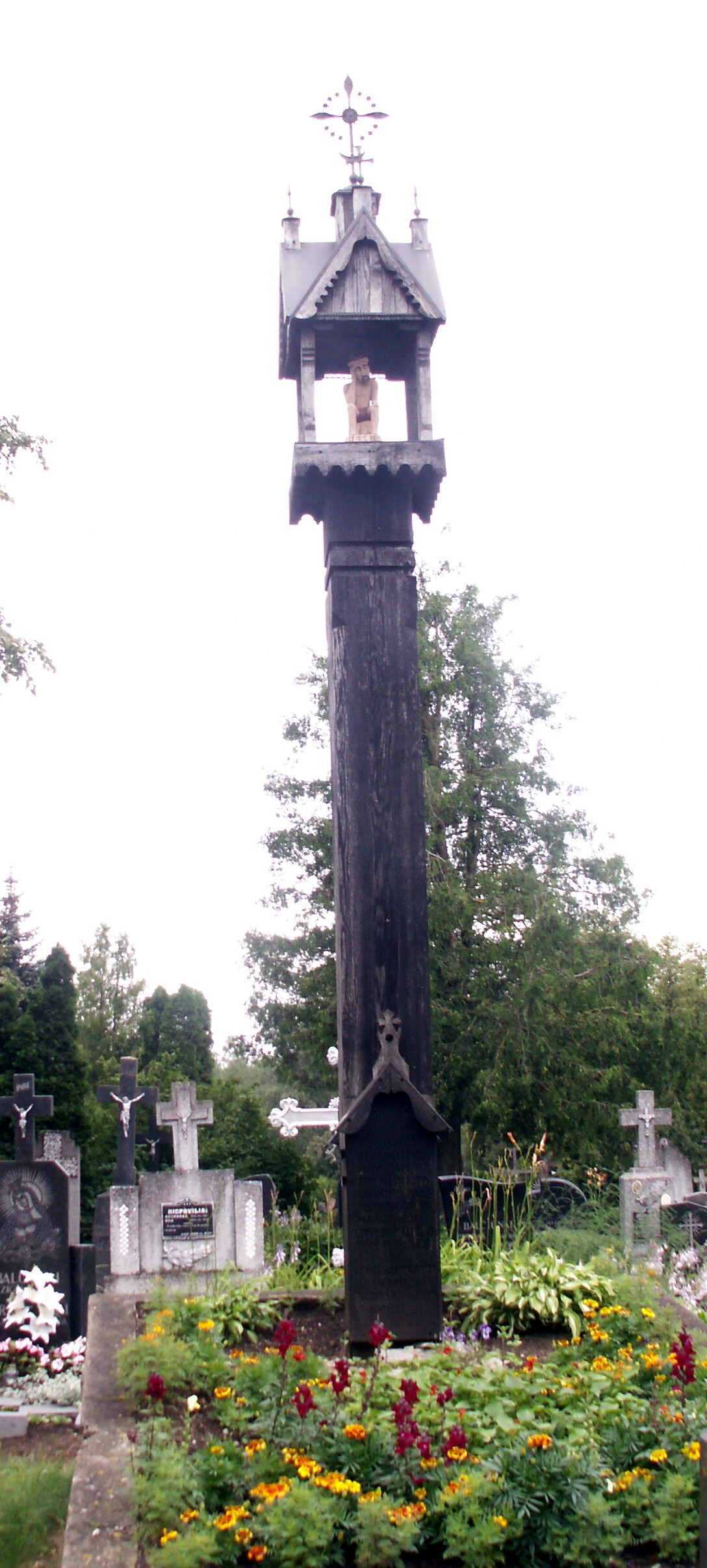

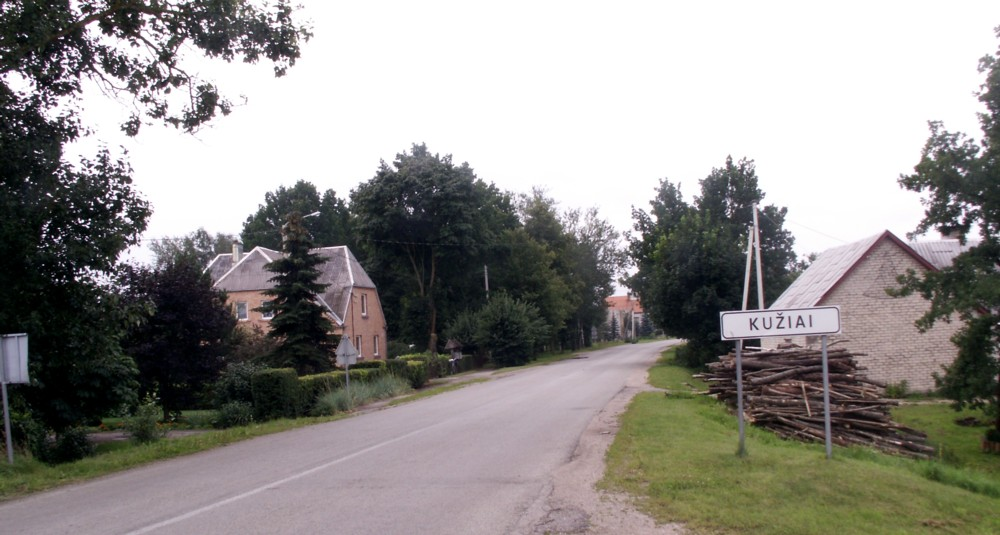
Arriving from Verbūnai

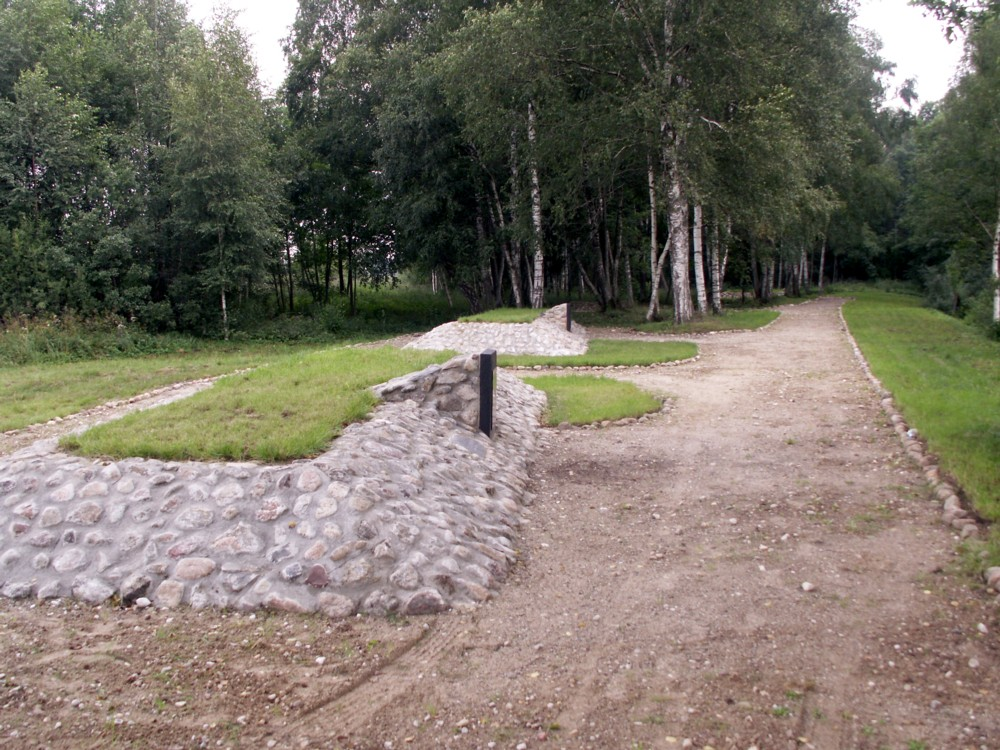
Genocide victims' graves in the forest Lužtino

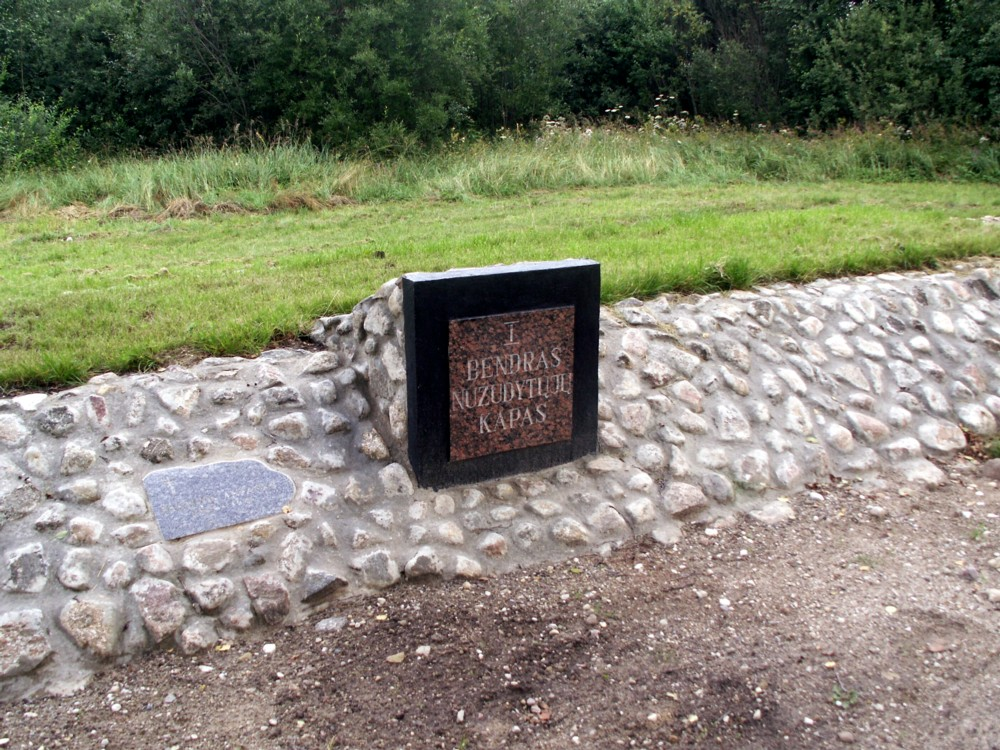
Lužtino mass grave in the forest

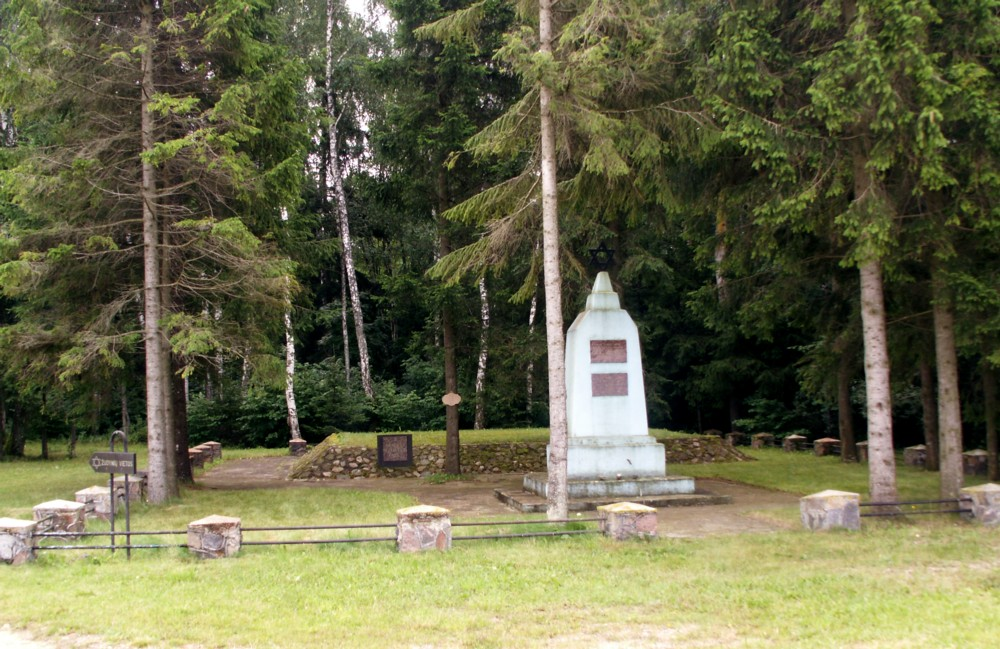
The second grave in Lužtino forest

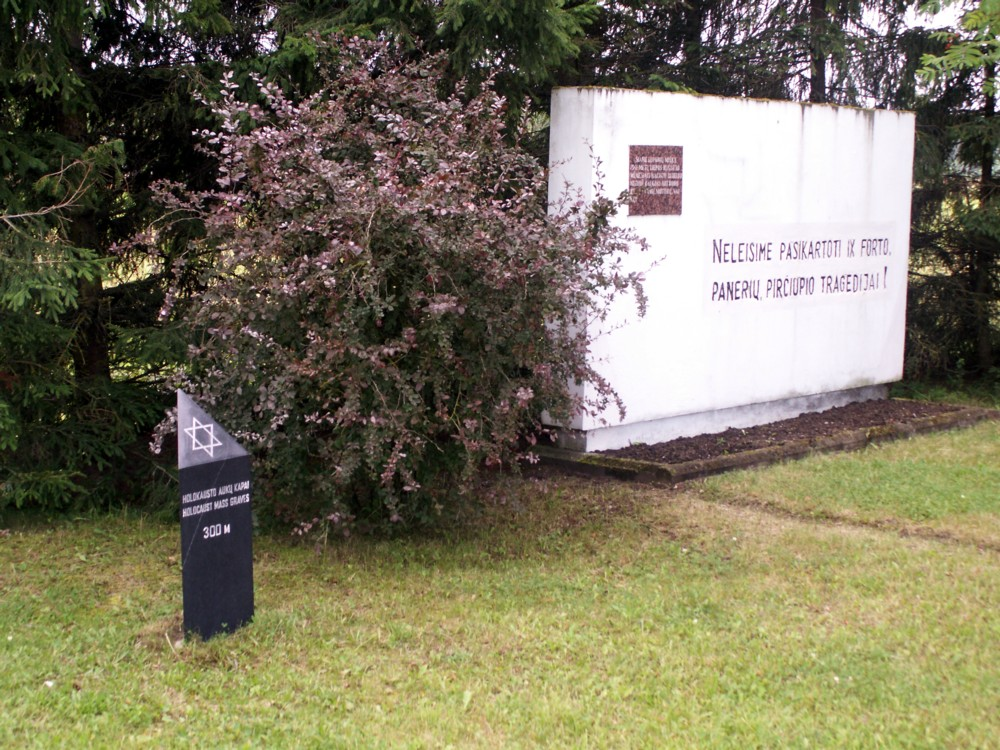
Memorial near road Kužiai–Verbūnai

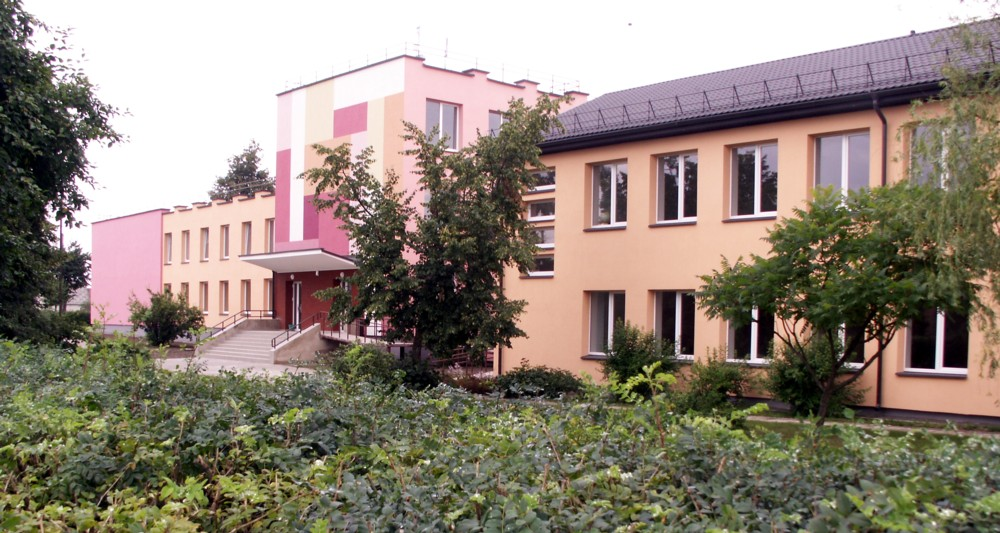
School
