= List of cities in Lithuania =

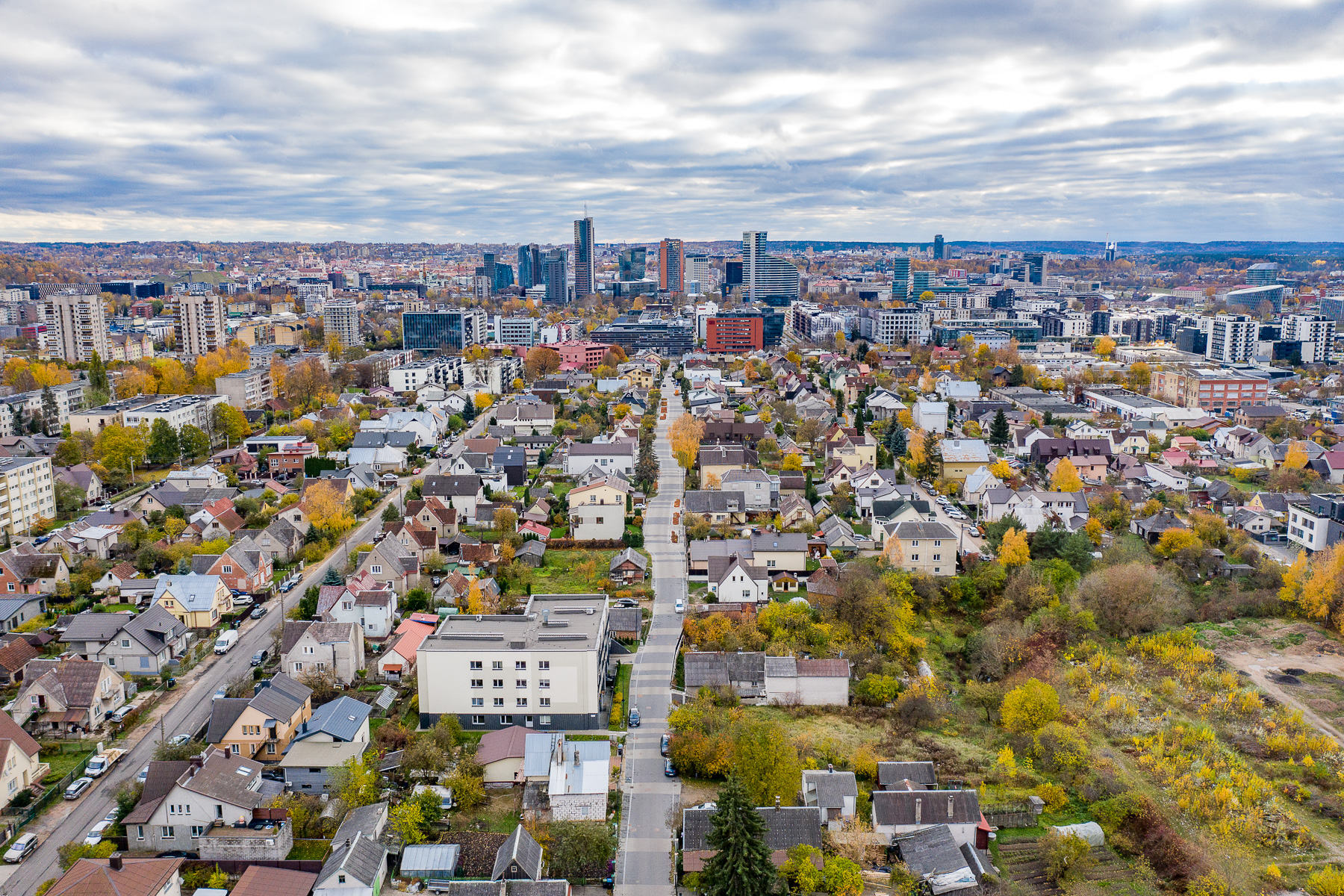
Vilnius is the largest city of Lithuania with urban population over 700,000 inhabitants

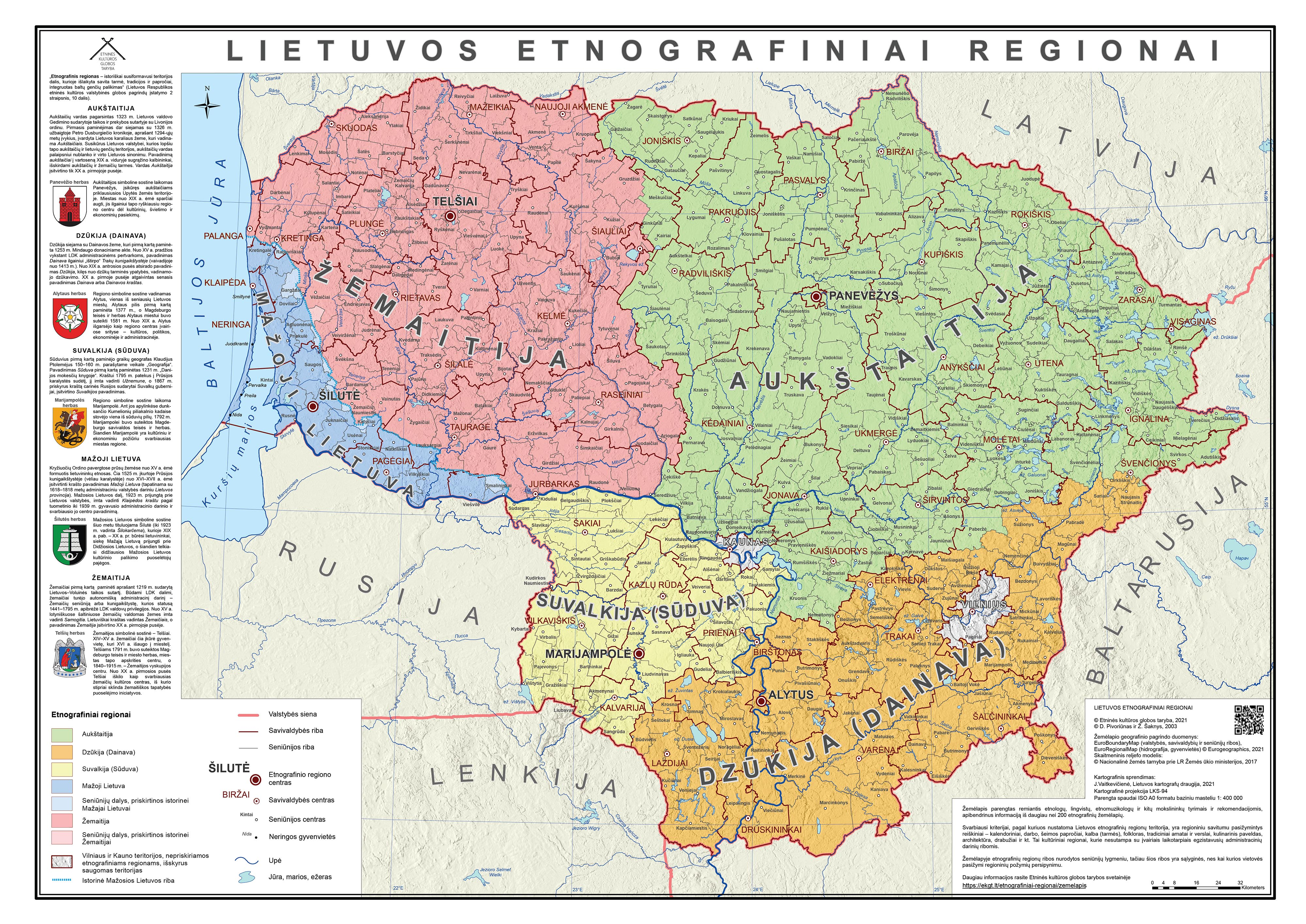
Detailed map of cultural regions of Lithuania including all of its cities and towns

In Lithuania, there are 103 cities (miestai). The term city is defined by the Parliament of Lithuania as a compact urban area with more than 3,000 people, of whom at least two-thirds work in the industry or service sector. Settlements with a population of less than 3,000 but with historical city status are still considered to be cities. Smaller settlements are known as towns (miesteliai), and even smaller settlements are known as villages (kaimai). Often the official status of these smaller settlements are unclear, and people simply refer to both towns and villages as settlements (gyvenvietės).

The cities started to form between the 13th and 14th centuries together with the Grand Duchy of Lithuania. The first to receive city rights was Klaipėda. According to medieval law, a city could have its own fairs, taverns, guilds, courts, etc. Some former cities lost their status and are now just towns or villages, for example Kernavė and Merkinė. Most of the cities in Lithuania were established before the 18th century. Their location is mostly determined by trade and transportation routes. Some of the newer cities grew because of railroad construction, for example Kaišiadorys, Vievis, Radviliškis, Ignalina and Mažeikiai. In the 20th century, new cities grew primarily to service state developed industrial complexes, for example Visaginas, Elektrėnai and Naujoji Akmenė.

Of over 100 cities, only 14 have populations of over 20,000. Five cities (Birštonas, Druskininkai, Neringa, Palanga and Anykščiai) have a special resort status. Cities are quite evenly spread out through the territory of Lithuania. At the 2001 census, 66.7% of the population lived in cities. At the 2021 census the proportion had increased slightly to 68.2% of the population.

== Cities with over 50,000 inhabitants ==
#	CoA	City	Pronunciation	Population			Change	Granted city rights	County	Municipalities in urban area	Urban area population (2024)
#	CoA	City	Pronunciation	2026	2021	2001	Change	Granted city rights	County	Municipalities in urban area	Urban area population (2024)
1		Vilnius	Listen • Info	609,630	546,155	554,281	−1.47%	1387	Vilnius County	See Vilnius urban area	708,627
2		Kaunas	Listen • Info	303,613	298,753	378,943	−21.16%	1408	Kaunas County	See Kaunas urban area	410,475
3		Klaipėda	Listen • Info	160,295	152,008	192,954	−21.22%	1257	Klaipėda County	Klaipėda City Municipality, Klaipėda District Municipality	226,676
4		Šiauliai	Listen • Info	111,359	100,653	133,883	−24.82%	1589	Šiauliai County	Šiauliai City Municipality, Šiauliai District Municipality	151,026
5		Panevėžys	Listen • Info	83,857	89,100	119,749	−25.59%	1837	Panevėžys County	See Panevėžys urban area	121,977
6		Alytus	Listen • Info	49,467	52,727	71,491	−26.25%	1581	Alytus County	Alytus City Municipality, Alytus District Municipality	76,815

== Cities between 20,000 and 50,000 inhabitants ==
#	CoA	City	Pronunciation	Population			Change	Granted city rights	County	Municipality
#	CoA	City	Pronunciation	2026	2021	2001	Change	Granted city rights	County	Municipality
1		Marijampolė	Listen • Info	35,672	36,727	48,675	−24.55%	1792	Marijampolė County	Marijampolė Municipality
2		Mažeikiai	Listen • Info	32,664	33,101	42,675	−22.43%	1924	Telšiai County	Mažeikiai District Municipality
3		Utena	Listen • Info	26,125	25,343	33,860	−25.15%	1599	Utena County	Utena District Municipality
4		Jonava	Listen • Info	26,119	27,381	34,954	−21.67%	1864	Kaunas County	Jonava District Municipality
5		Kėdainiai	Listen • Info	23,190	23,461	32,048	−26.79%	1590	Kaunas County	Kėdainiai District Municipality
6		Tauragė	Listen • Info	21,656	21,203	29,124	−27.20%	1924	Tauragė County	Tauragė District Municipality
7		Telšiai	Listen • Info	21,350	22,642	31,460	−28.03%	1791	Telšiai County	Telšiai District Municipality
8		Ukmergė	Listen • Info	20,857	21,258	28,759	−26.08%	1486	Vilnius County	Ukmergė District Municipality

== Cities between 5,000 and 20,000 inhabitants ==
#	CoA	City	Pronunciation (audio help)	Population			Granted city rights	County	Municipality
#	CoA	City	Pronunciation (audio help)	2026	2021	2001	Granted city rights	County	Municipality
1		Palanga	Listen • Info	19,545	16,746	17,623	1791	Klaipėda County	Palanga City Municipality
2		Visaginas	Listen • Info	18,640	19,446	29,554	1995	Utena County	Visaginas Municipality
3		Kretinga	Listen • Info	16,971	17,249	21,423	1609	Klaipėda County	Kretinga District Municipality
4		Plungė	Listen • Info	16,552	17,543	23,436	1792	Telšiai County	Plungė District Municipality
5		Šilutė	Listen • Info	15,687	15,952	21,476	1941	Klaipėda County	Šilutė District Municipality
6		Gargždai	Listen • Info	15,591	15,065	15,212	1792	Klaipėda County	Klaipėda District Municipality
7		Radviliškis	Listen • Info	15,208	15,103	20,339	1923	Šiauliai County	Radviliškis District Municipality
8		Druskininkai	Listen • Info	12,708	12,908	18,233	1893	Alytus County	Druskininkai Municipality
9		Elektrėnai	Listen • Info	12,059	11,255	14,050	1962	Vilnius County	Elektrėnai Municipality
10		Jurbarkas	Listen • Info	11,270	10,186	13,797	1611	Tauragė County	Jurbarkas District Municipality
11		Rokiškis	Listen • Info	10,947	11,770	16,746	1920	Panevėžys County	Rokiškis District Municipality
12		Kuršėnai	Listen • Info	10,298	10,916	14,197	1946	Šiauliai County	Šiauliai District Municipality
13		Vilkaviškis	Listen • Info	9,860	10,286	13,283	1660	Marijampolė County	Vilkaviškis District Municipality
14		Biržai	Listen • Info	9,801	10,734	15,262	1589	Panevėžys County	Biržai District Municipality
15		Grigiškės	Listen • Info	9,775	9,950	11,448	1958	Vilnius County	Vilnius City Municipality
16		Garliava	Listen • Info	9,660	10,366	13,322	1958	Kaunas County	Kaunas District Municipality
17		Lentvaris	Listen • Info	9,346	9,713	11,773	1946	Vilnius County	Trakai District Municipality
18		Raseiniai	Listen • Info	9,321	9,865	12,541	1492–1506	Kaunas County	Raseiniai District Municipality
19		Prienai	Listen • Info	8,650	8,796	11,353	1609	Kaunas County	Prienai District Municipality
20		Kaišiadorys	Listen • Info	8,343	8,380	10,002	1946	Kaunas County	Kaišiadorys District Municipality
21		Joniškis	Listen • Info	8,179	8,612	11,329	1616	Šiauliai County	Joniškis District Municipality
22		Anykščiai	Listen • Info	8,143	8,697	11,958	1516	Utena County	Anykščiai District Municipality
23		Naujoji Akmenė	Listen • Info	7,966	7,985	12,345	1792	Šiauliai County	Akmenė District Municipality
24		Varėna	Listen • Info	7,481	8,202	10,845	1946	Alytus County	Varėna District Municipality
25		Šalčininkai	Listen • Info	7,419	6,857	6,722	1956	Vilnius County	Šalčininkai District Municipality
26		Kelmė	Listen • Info	7,061	7,688	10,900	1947	Šiauliai County	Kelmė District Municipality
27		Pasvalys	Listen • Info	6,149	6,451	8,709	1946	Panevėžys County	Pasvalys District Municipality
28		Kupiškis	Listen • Info	5,813	6,218	8,451	1791	Panevėžys County	Kupiškis District Municipality
29		Trakai	Listen • Info	5,680	5,426	5,725	1409	Vilnius County	Trakai District Municipality
30		Zarasai	Listen • Info	5,537	6,077	8,365	1843	Utena County	Zarasai District Municipality
31		Širvintos	Listen • Info	5,433	5,827	7,273	1950	Vilnius County	Širvintos District Municipality
32		Molėtai	Listen • Info	5,409	5,782	7,221	1956	Utena County	Molėtai District Municipality
33		Kazlų Rūda	Listen • Info	5,344	5,590	7,401	1950	Marijampolė County	Kazlų Rūda Municipality
34		Šakiai	Listen • Info	5,156	5,462	6,795	1776	Marijampolė County	Šakiai District Municipality
35		Skuodas	Listen • Info	5,015	5,508	7,896	1572	Klaipėda County	Skuodas District Municipality

== Cities between 900 and 5,000 inhabitants ==
#	CoA	City	Pronunciation (audio help)	Population			Granted city rights	County	Municipality
#	CoA	City	Pronunciation (audio help)	2026	2021	2001	Granted city rights	County	Municipality
1		Neringa	Listen • Info	4,643	3,609	2,386	1961	Klaipėda County	Neringa Municipality
2		Ignalina	Listen • Info	4,515	5,106	6,591	1950	Utena County	Ignalina District Municipality
3		Pabradė	Listen • Info	4,488	4,918	6,525	1946	Vilnius County	Švenčionys District Municipality
4		Šilalė	Listen • Info	4,461	4,729	6,281	1950	Tauragė County	Šilalė District Municipality
5		Nemenčinė	Listen • Info	4,351	4,831	5,892	1955	Vilnius County	Vilnius District Municipality
6		Pakruojis	Listen • Info	4,337	4,594	6,057	1950	Šiauliai County	Pakruojis District Municipality
7		Švenčionėliai	Listen • Info	4,258	4,748	6,923	1920	Vilnius County	Švenčionys District Municipality
8		Vievis	Listen • Info	4,134	4,311	5,303	1950	Vilnius County	Elektrėnai Municipality
9		Švenčionys	Listen • Info	4,120	4,448	5,684	1800	Vilnius County	Švenčionys District Municipality
10		Kybartai	Listen • Info	3,821	4,126	6,556	1947	Marijampolė County	Vilkaviškis District Municipality
11		Kalvarija	Listen • Info	3,793	3,982	5,090	1791	Marijampolė County	Kalvarija Municipality
12		Lazdijai	Listen • Info	3,655	4,016	5,140	1957	Alytus County	Lazdijai District Municipality
13		Eišiškės	Listen • Info	3,133	2,908	3,765	1950	Vilnius County	Šalčininkai District Municipality
14		Rietavas	Listen • Info	3,096	3,234	3,979	1792	Telšiai County	Rietavas Municipality
15		Birštonas	Listen • Info	2,970	3,072	3,225	1518?	Kaunas County	Birštonas Municipality
16		Žiežmariai	Listen • Info	2,862	3,158	3,884	1792	Kaunas County	Kaišiadorys District Municipality
17		Ariogala	Listen • Info	2,495	2,743	3,697	1792	Kaunas County	Raseiniai District Municipality
18		Šeduva	Listen • Info	2,298	2,421	3,400	1654	Šiauliai County	Radviliškis District Municipality
19		Akmenė	Listen • Info	2,185	2,355	3,140	1792	Šiauliai County	Akmenė District Municipality
20		Venta	Listen • Info	2,116	2,250	3,412	1995	Šiauliai County	Akmenė District Municipality
21		Viekšniai	Listen • Info	2,076	2,249	2,270	1791	Telšiai County	Mažeikiai District Municipality
22		Rūdiškės	Listen • Info	1,845	1,985	2,559	1958	Vilnius County	Trakai District Municipality
23		Tytuvėnai	Listen • Info	1,689	1,850	2,851	1956	Šiauliai County	Kelmė District Municipality
24		Vilkija	Listen • Info	1,622	1,762	2,338	1792	Kaunas County	Kaunas District Municipality
25		Ežerėlis	Listen • Info	1,543	1,640	2,051	1956	Kaunas County	Kaunas District Municipality
26		Pagėgiai	Listen • Info	1,501	1,576	2,393	1923	Tauragė County	Pagėgiai Municipality
27		Gelgaudiškis	Listen • Info	1,449	1,572	2,029	1958	Marijampolė County	Šakiai District Municipality
28		Skaudvilė	Listen • Info	1,314	1,427	2,140	1950	Tauragė County	Tauragė District Municipality
29		Kudirkos Naumiestis	Listen • Info	1,226	1,381	1,997	1643	Marijampolė County	Šakiai District Municipality
30		Žagarė	Listen • Info	1,174	1,326	2,312	1924	Šiauliai County	Joniškis District Municipality
31		Linkuva	Listen • Info	1,160	1,283	1,797	1950	Šiauliai County	Pakruojis District Municipality
32		Priekulė	Listen • Info	1,145	1,245	1,725	1948	Klaipėda County	Klaipėda District Municipality
33		Salantai	Listen • Info	1,139	1,272	1,942	1746	Klaipėda County	Kretinga District Municipality
34		Ramygala	Listen • Info	1,121	1,241	1,733	1957	Panevėžys County	Panevėžys District Municipality
35		Simnas	Listen • Info	1,111	1,247	1,980	1626	Alytus County	Alytus District Municipality
36		Veisiejai	Listen • Info	984	1,141	1,762	1956	Alytus County	Lazdijai District Municipality
37		Baltoji Vokė	Listen • Info	980	998	1,073	1958	Vilnius County	Šalčininkai District Municipality
38		Jieznas	Listen • Info	974	1,047	1,476	1956	Kaunas County	Prienai District Municipality
39		Smalininkai	Listen • Info	942	852	653	1945	Tauragė County	Jurbarkas District Municipality
40		Joniškėlis	Listen • Info	915	1,026	1,477	1736	Panevėžys County	Pasvalys District Municipality
41		Daugai	Listen • Info	869	1,016	1,458	1792	Alytus County	Alytus District Municipality

== Remaining cities in Lithuania ==
The smallest cities in Lithuania that have below 1,000 inhabitants. The counties are ranked by number of cities and further ranked by the population of the largest one. Cities are ranked by the size of the population.

Panevėžys County (5)
Subačius, Obeliai, Vabalninkas, Pandėlys, Joniškėlis.
Utena County (4)
Dūkštas, Kavarskas, Dusetos, Troškūnai.
Alytus County (2)
Veisiejai, Daugai.
Tauragė County (2)
Smalininkai, Panemunė.
Telšiai County (2)
Varniai, Seda.
Vilnius County (1)
Baltoji Vokė.
Kaunas County (1)
Jieznas.
Marijampolė County (1)
Virbalis.
Šiauliai County (1)
Užventis.

== Map of Lithuanian cities by population ==
The largest cities in Lithuania

== Gallery ==
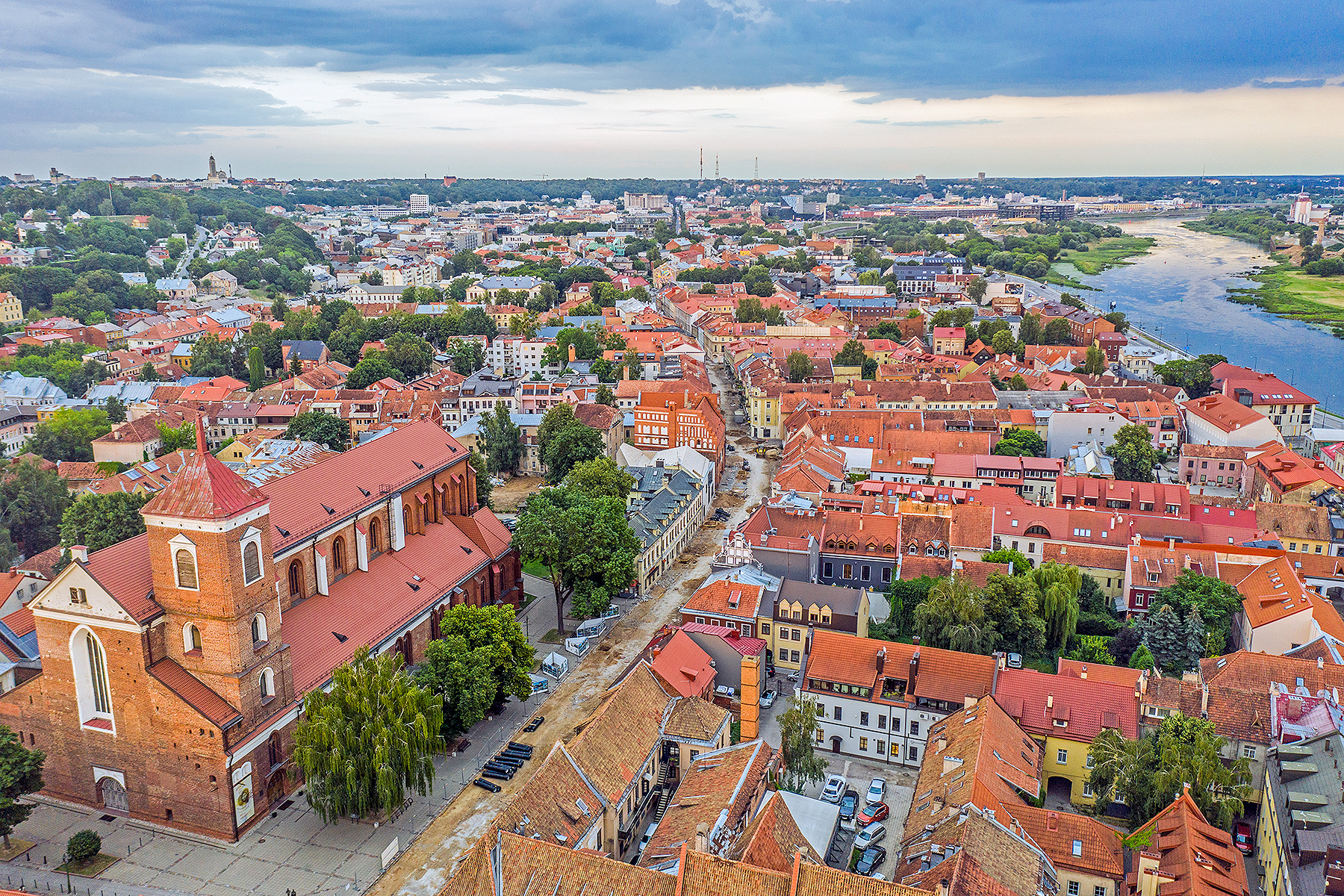
Kaunas

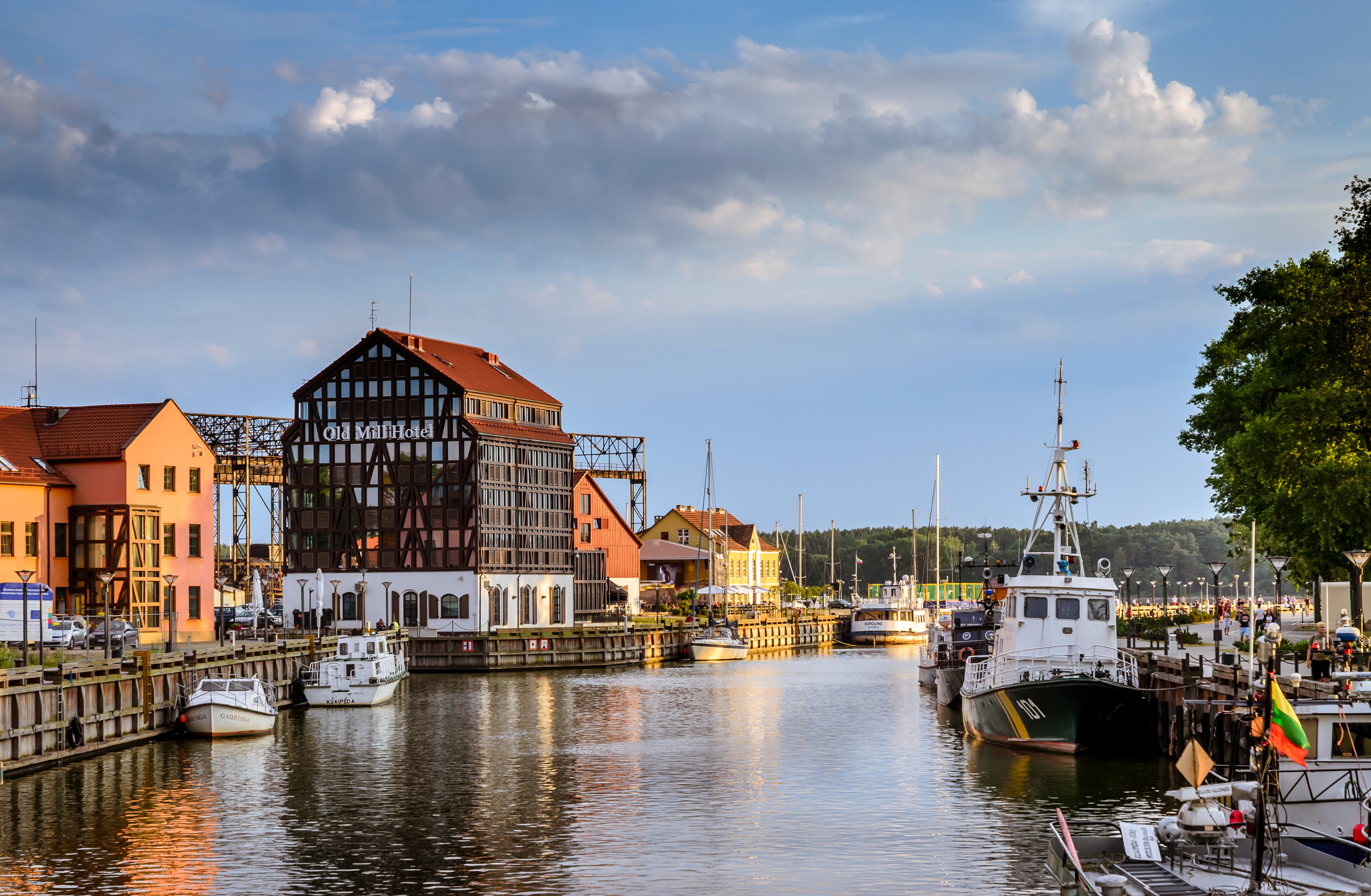
Klaipėda

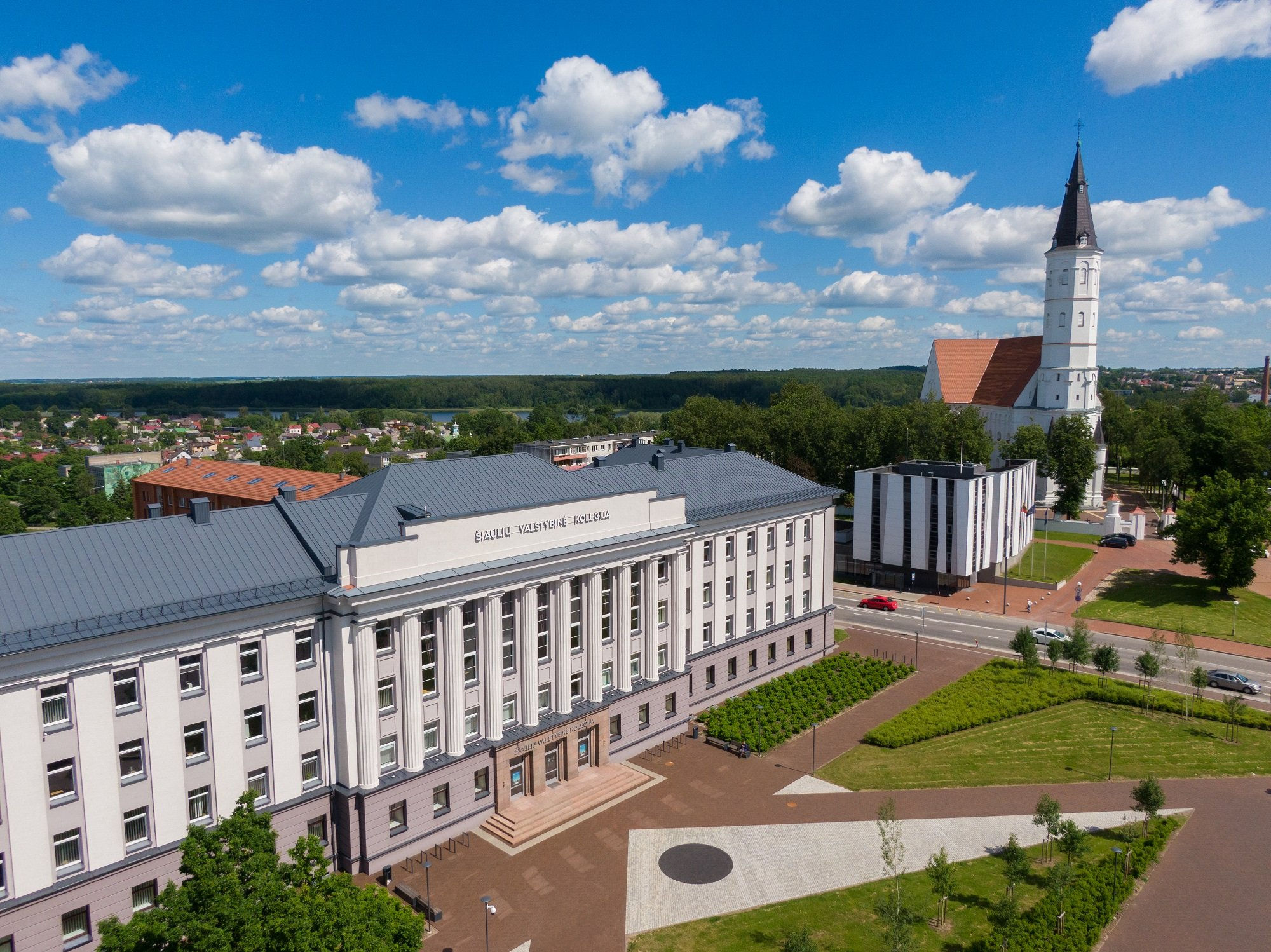
Šiauliai

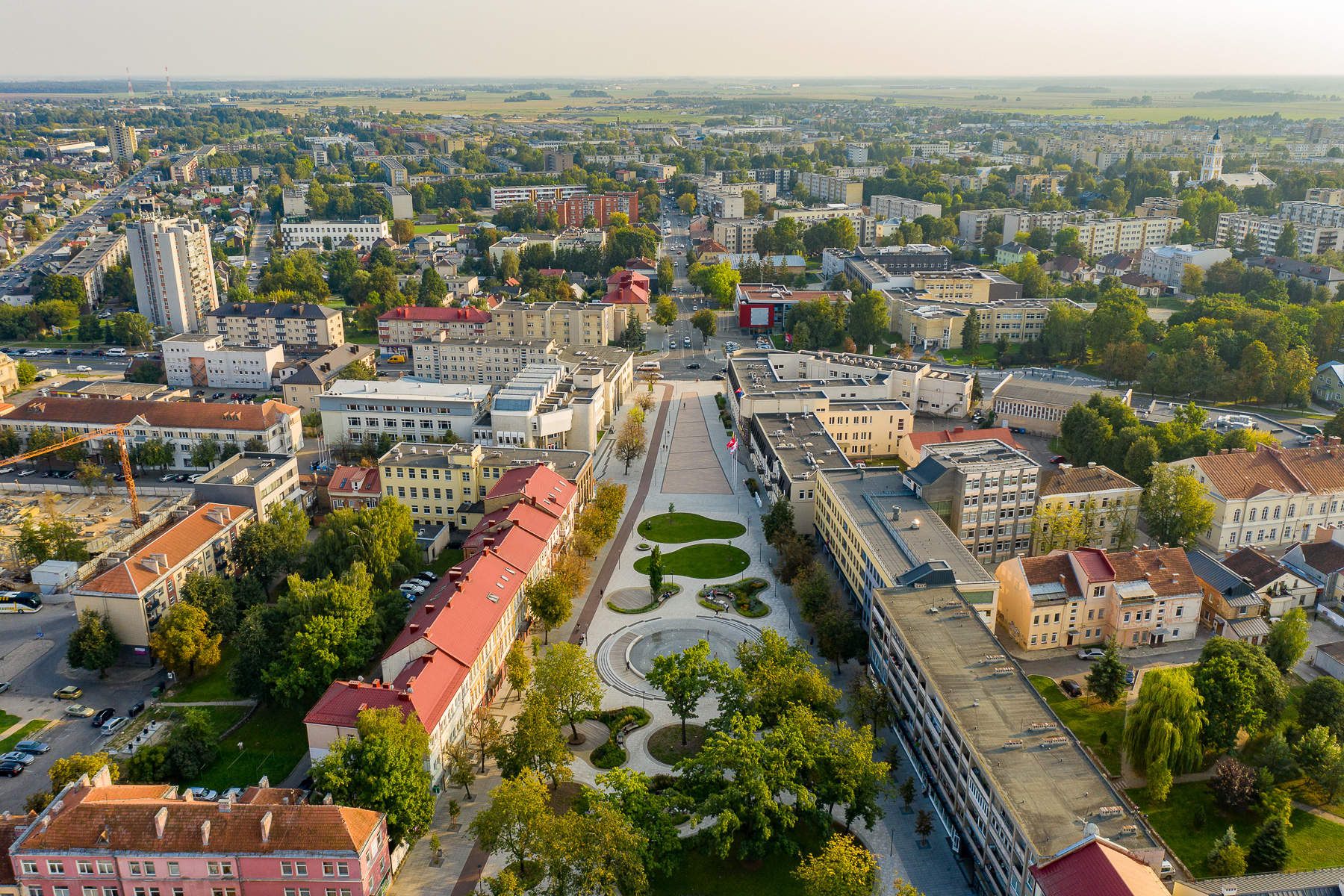
Panevėžys

Alytus

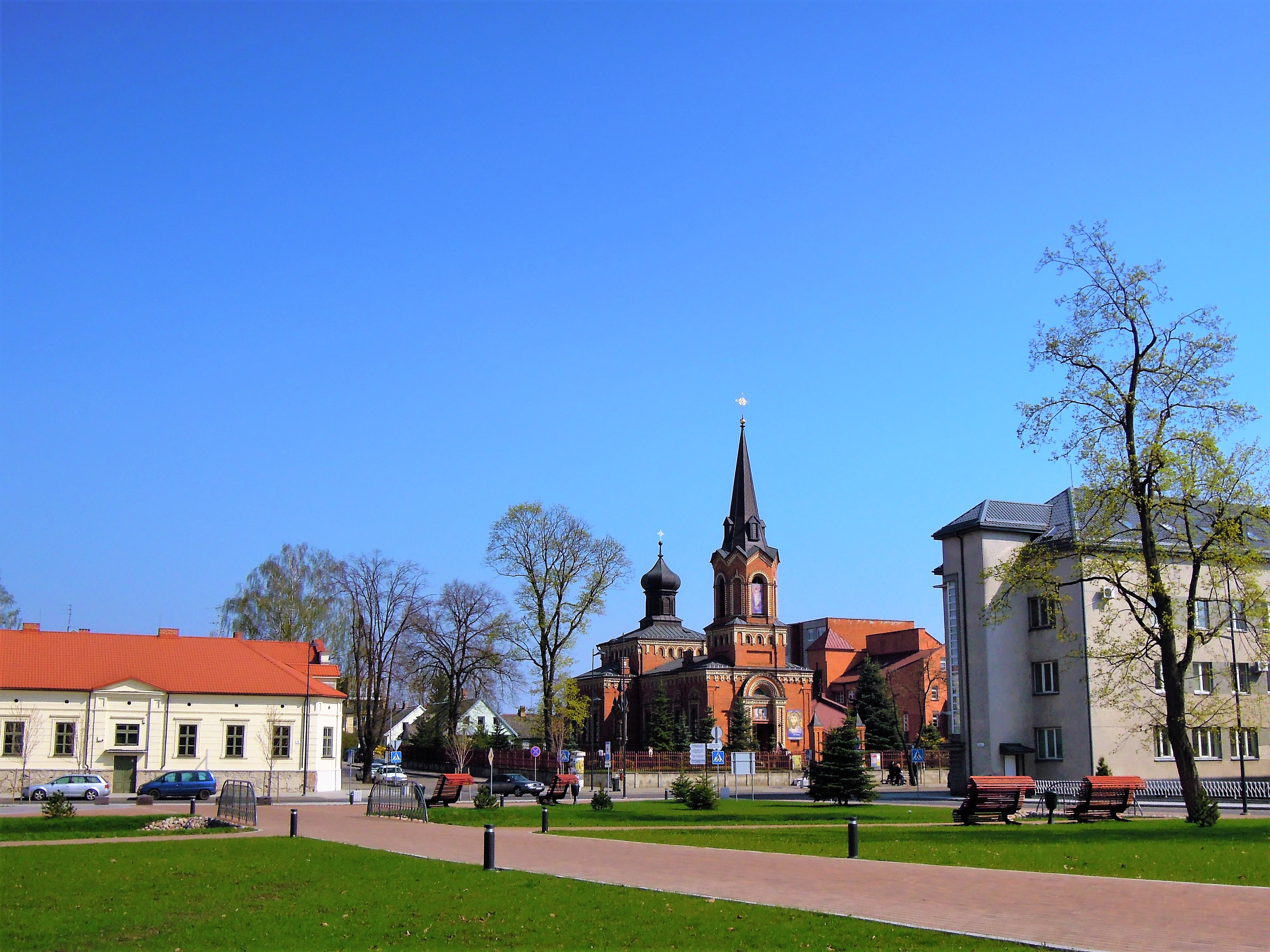
Marijampolė

Mažeikiai

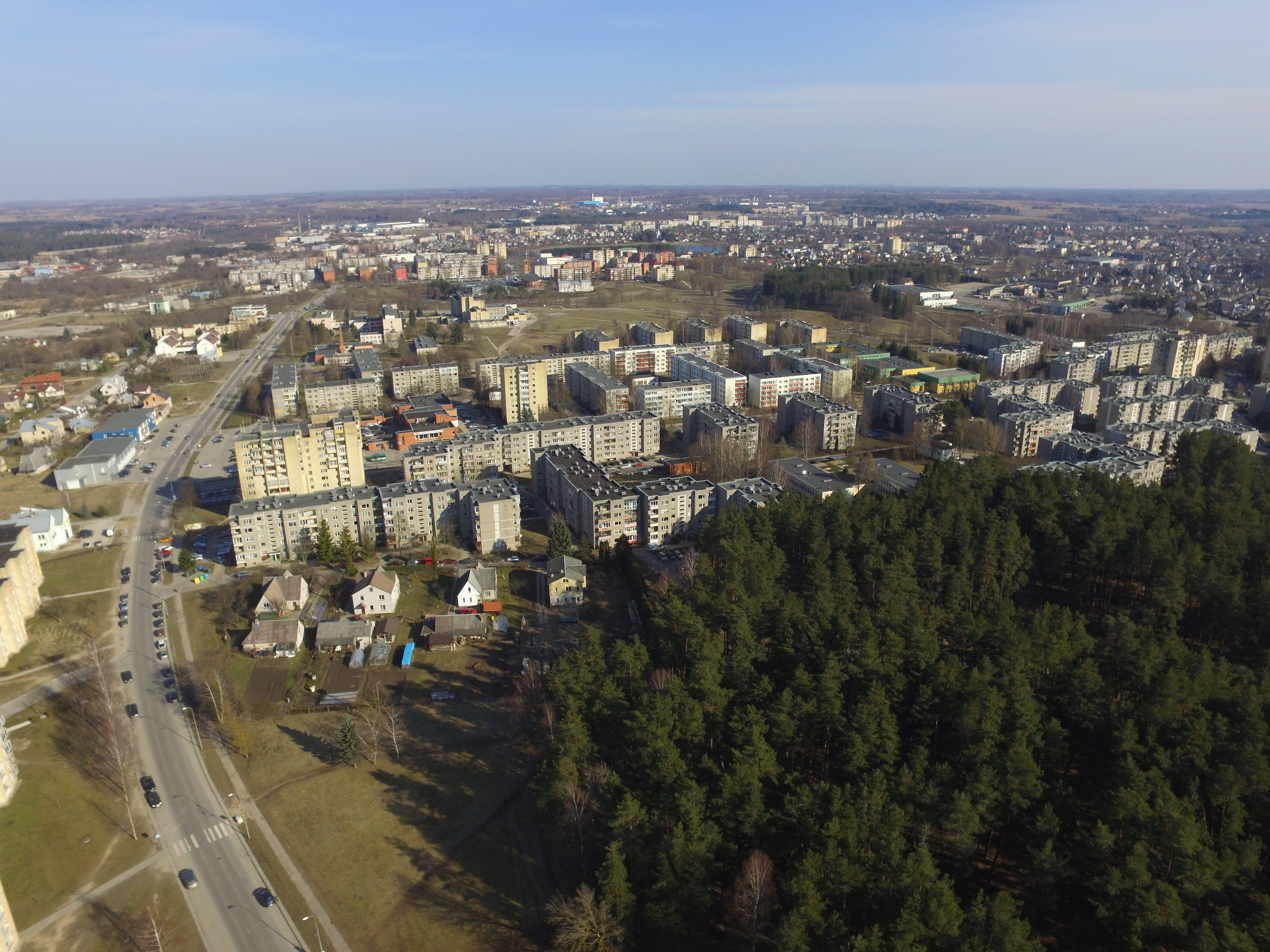
Utena

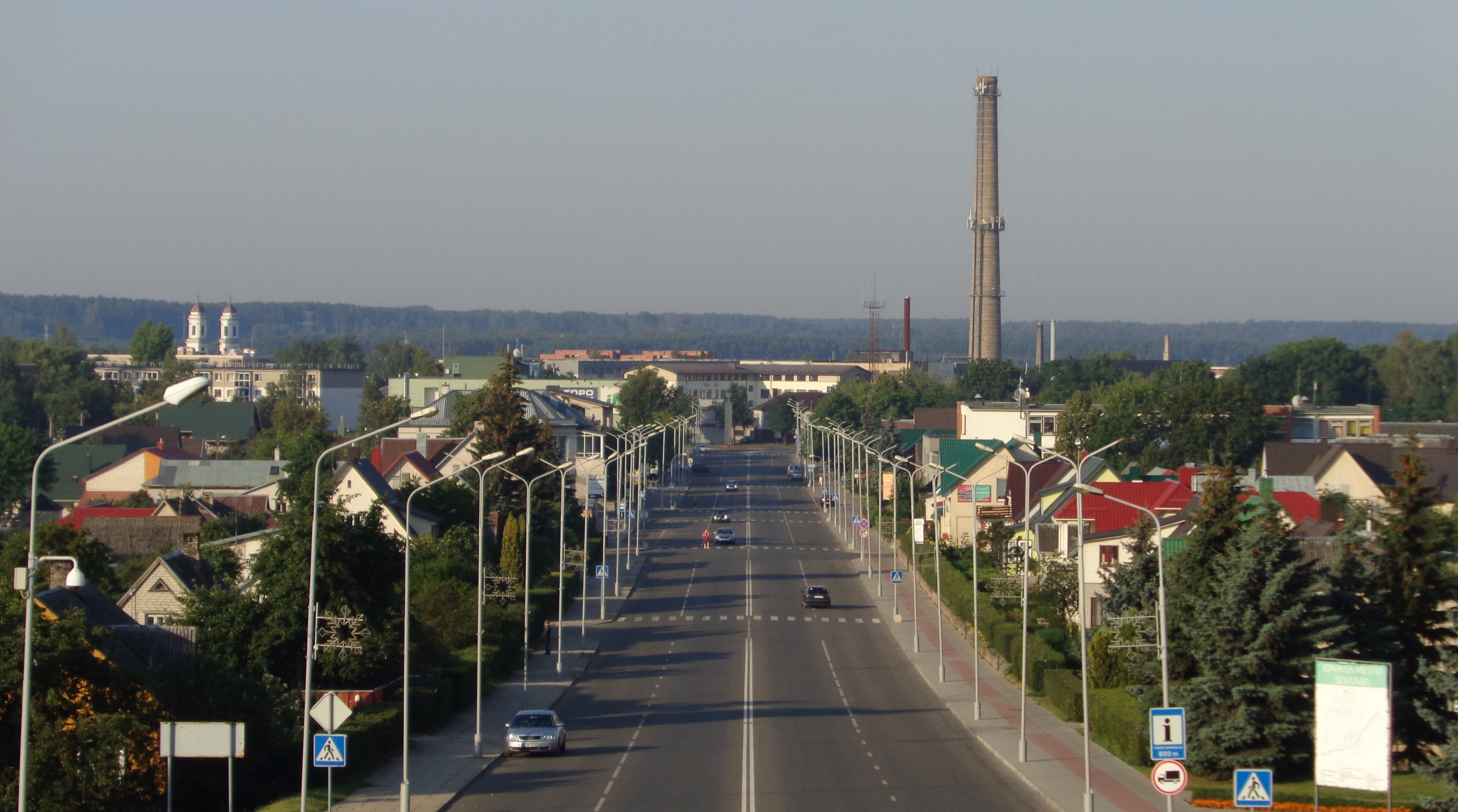
Jonava

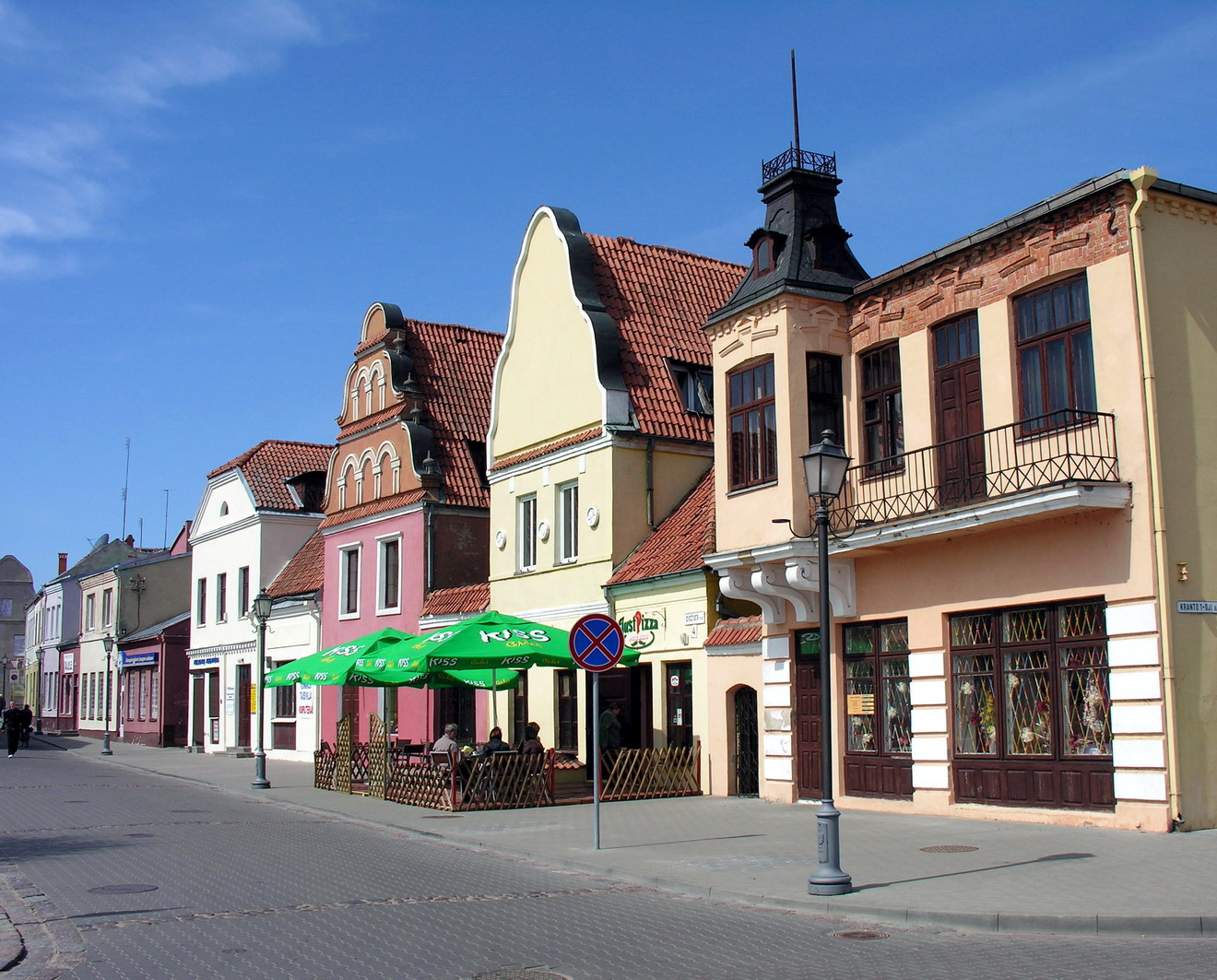
Kėdainiai

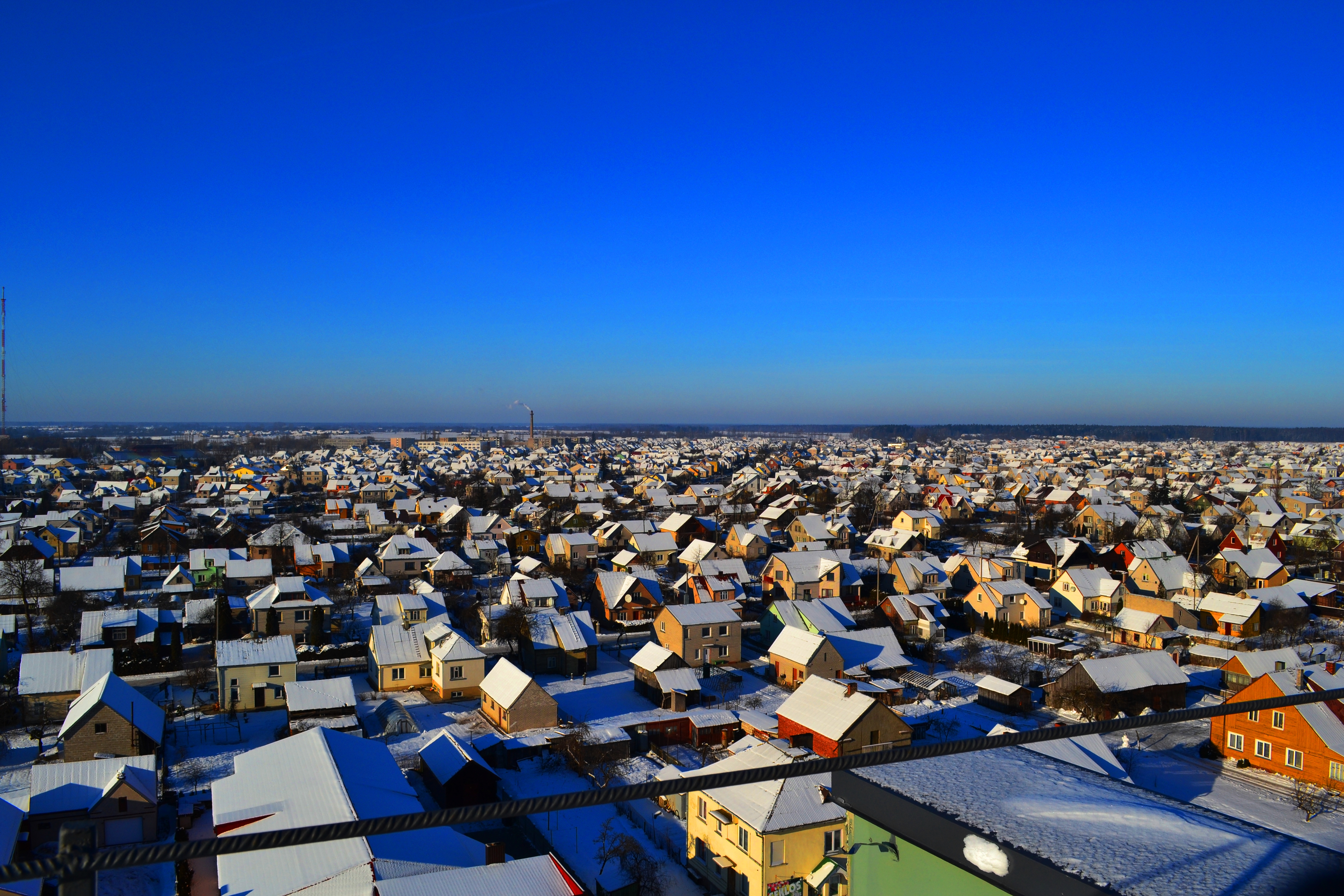
Tauragė

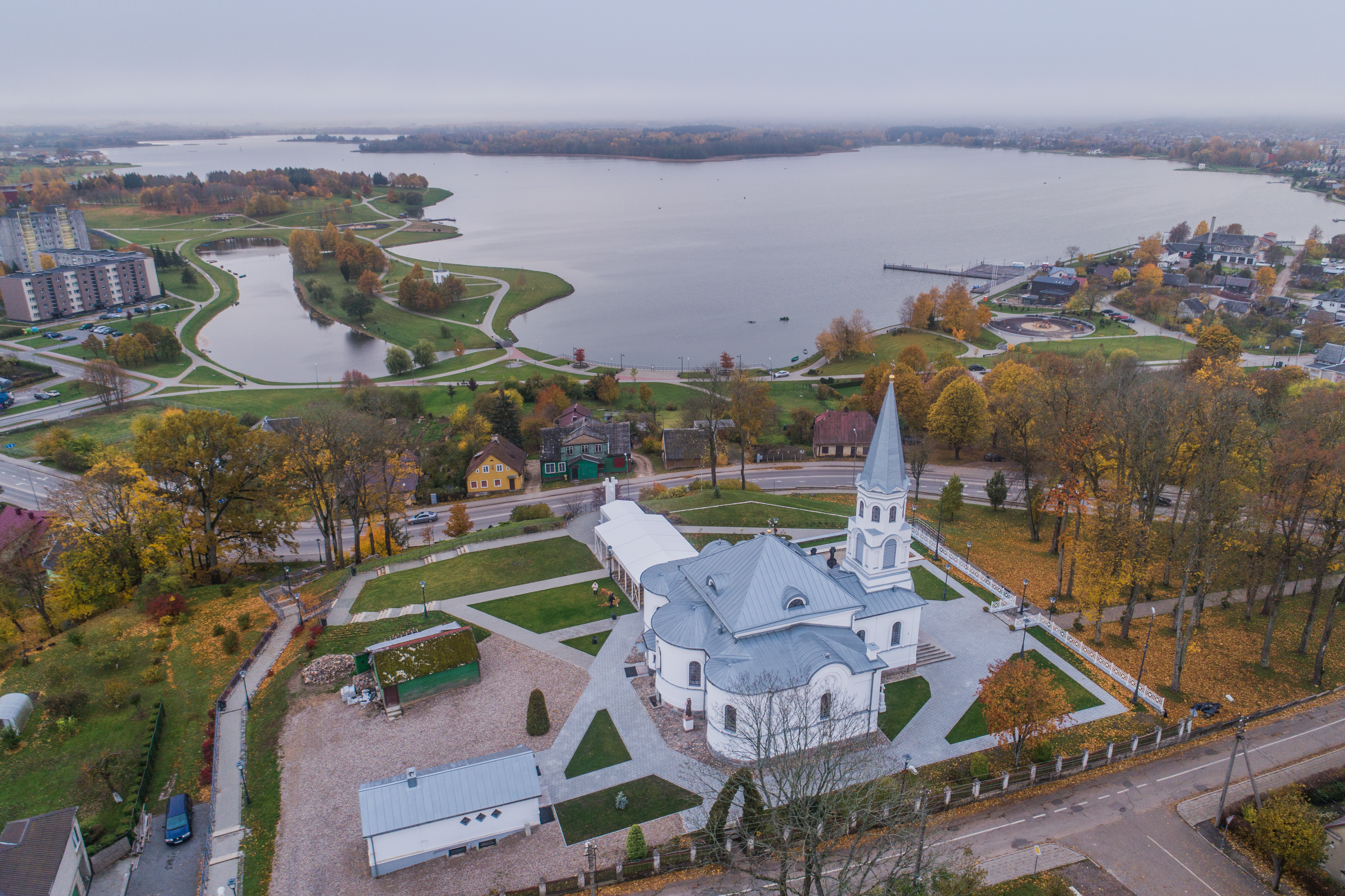
Telšiai

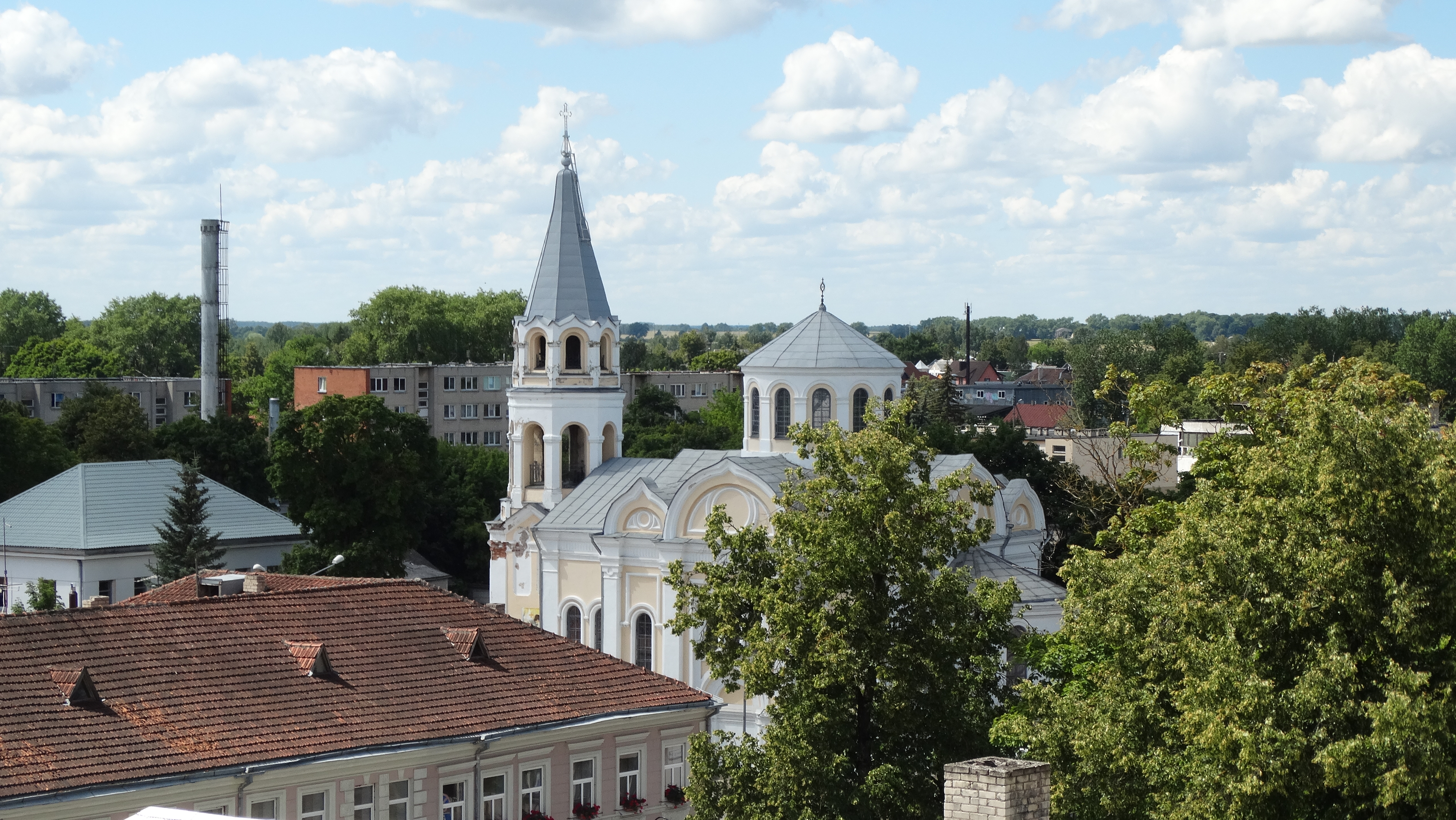
Ukmergė

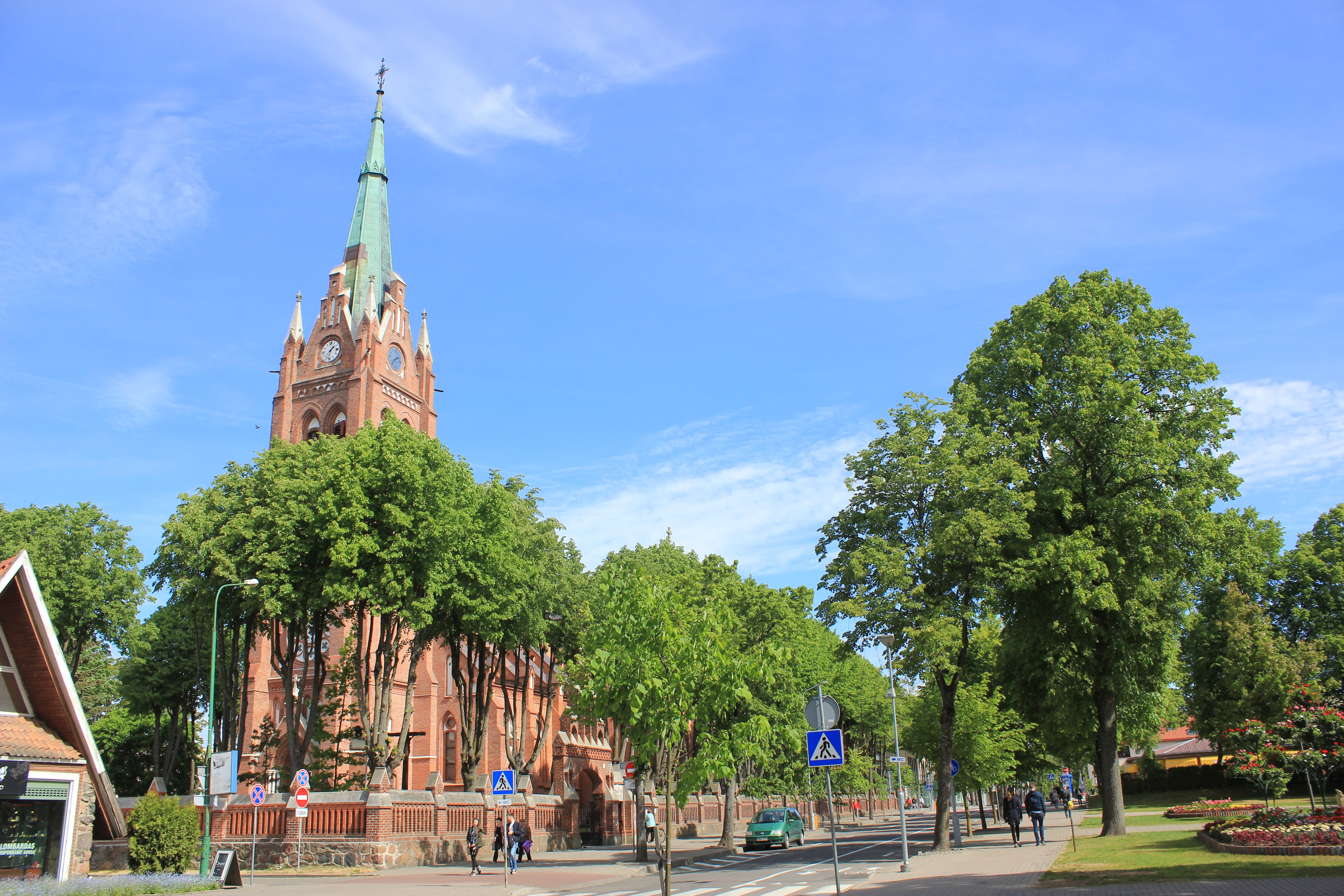
Palanga

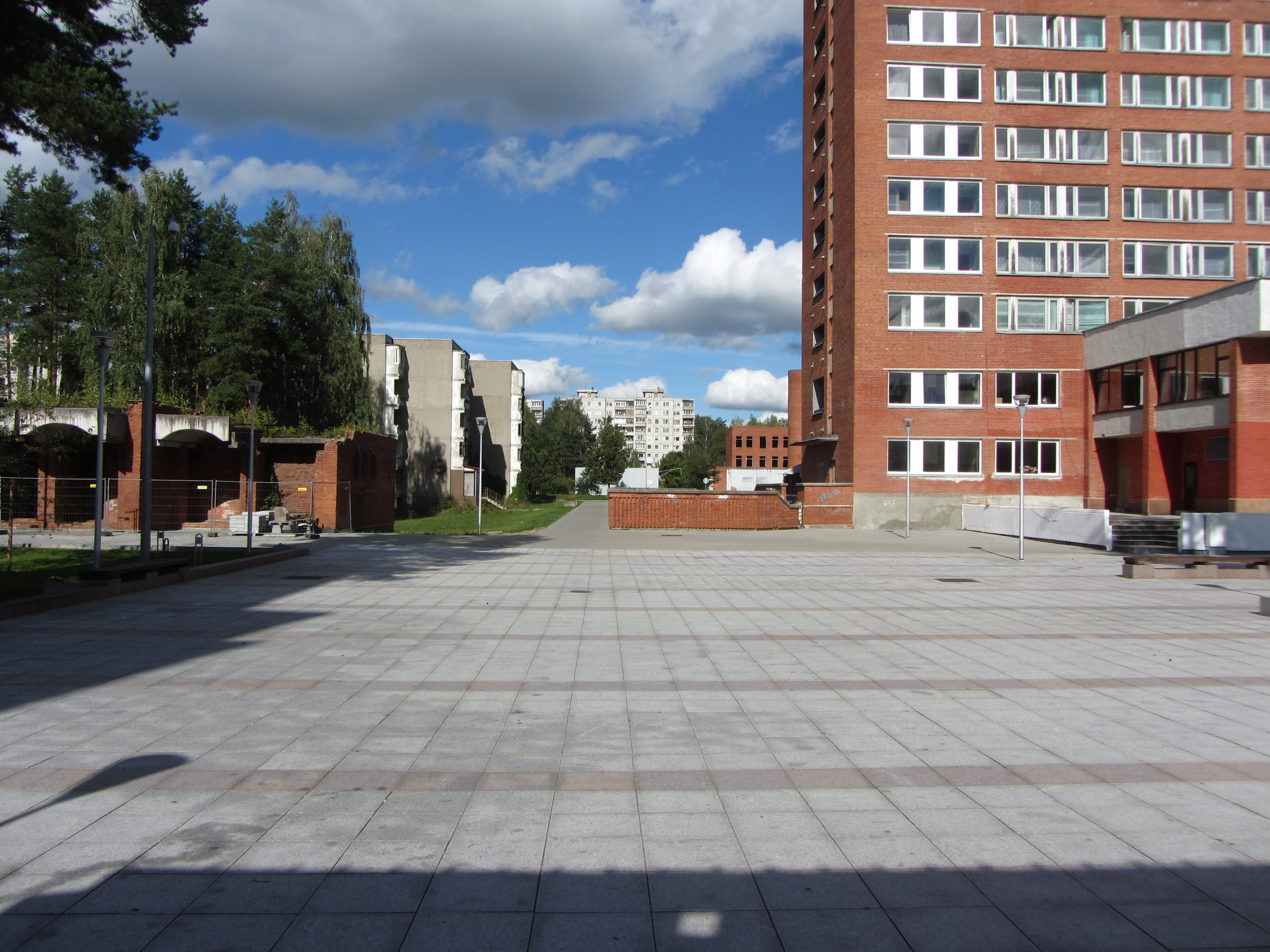
Visaginas

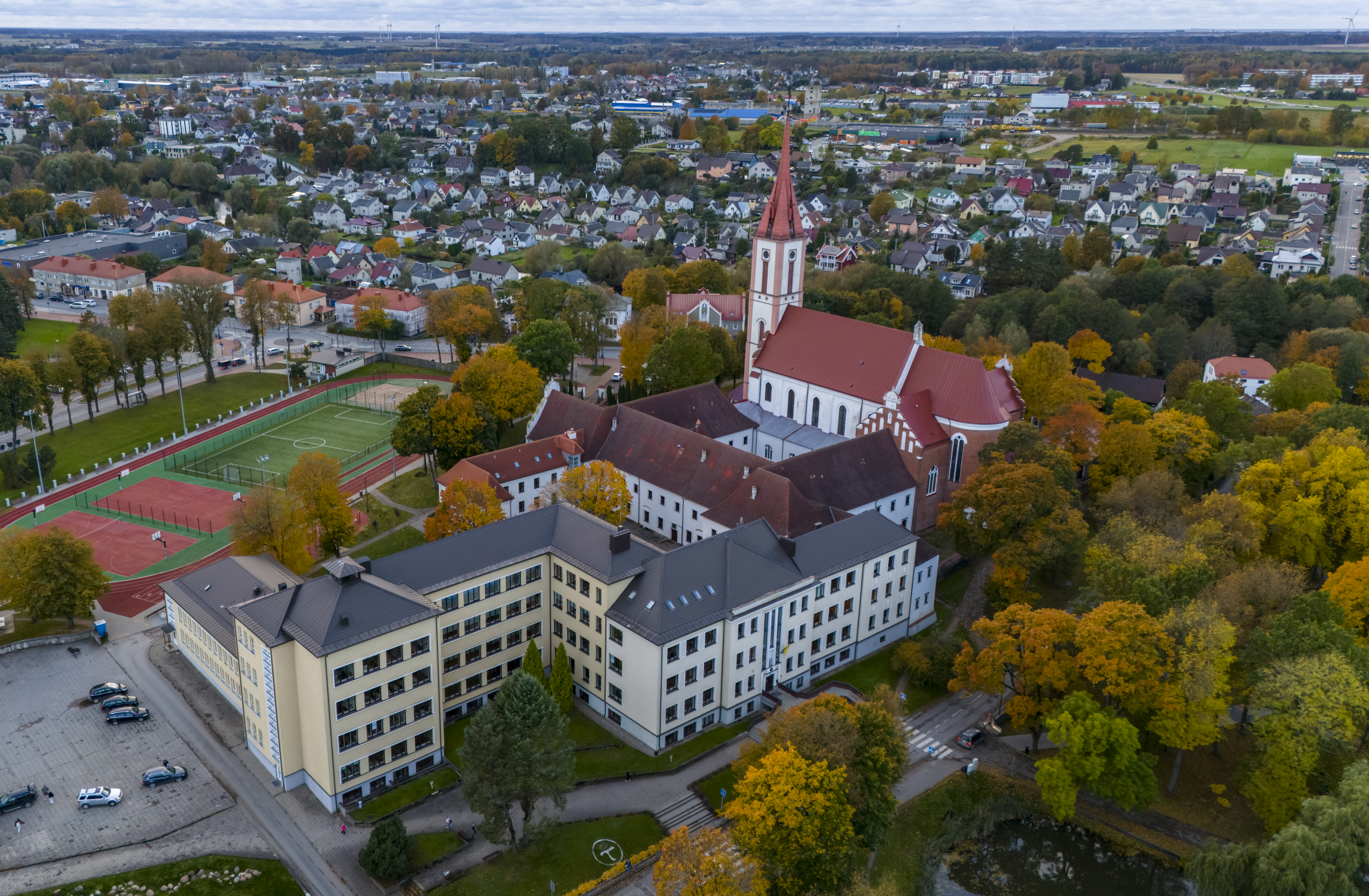
Kretinga

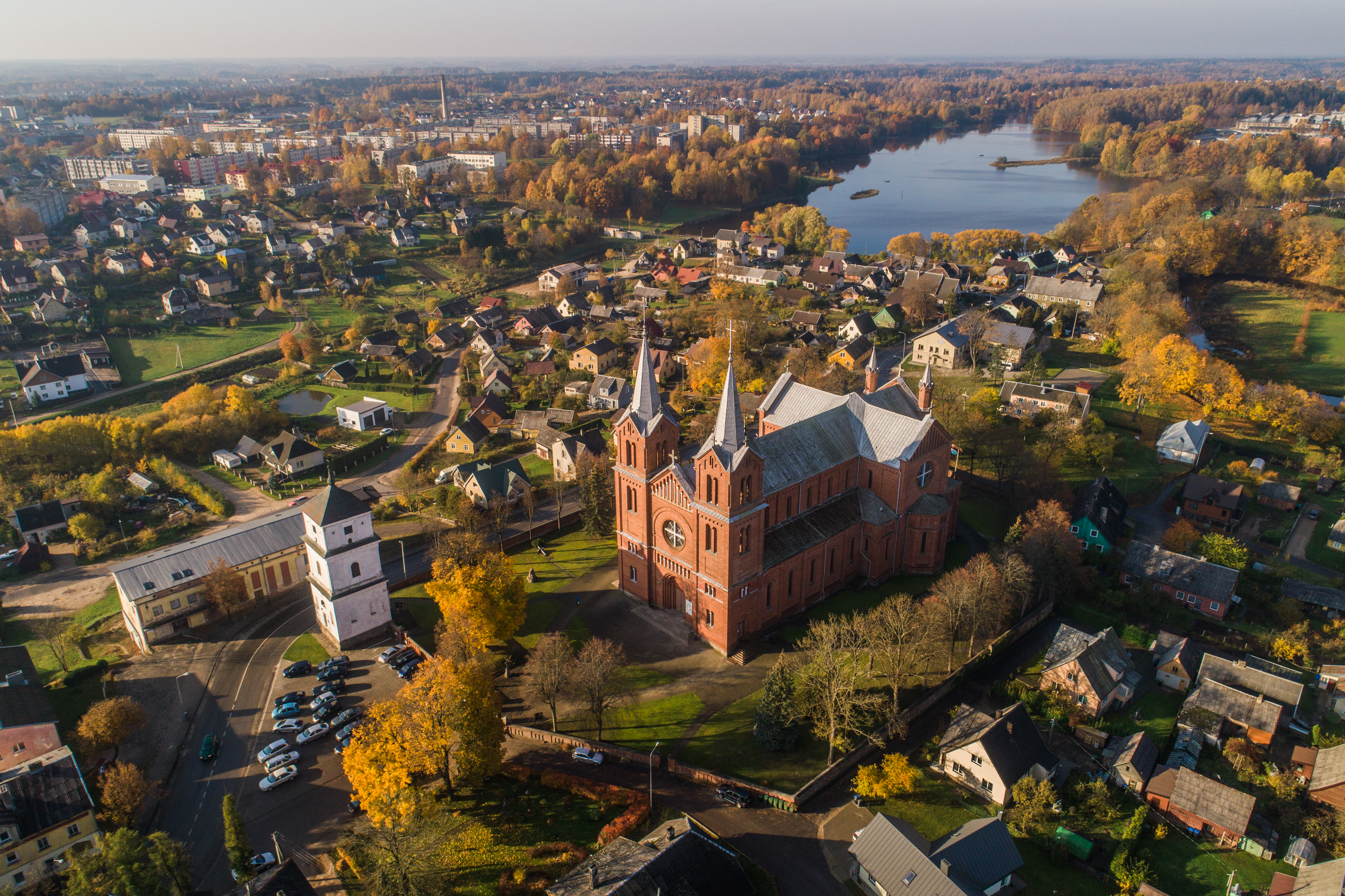
Plungė

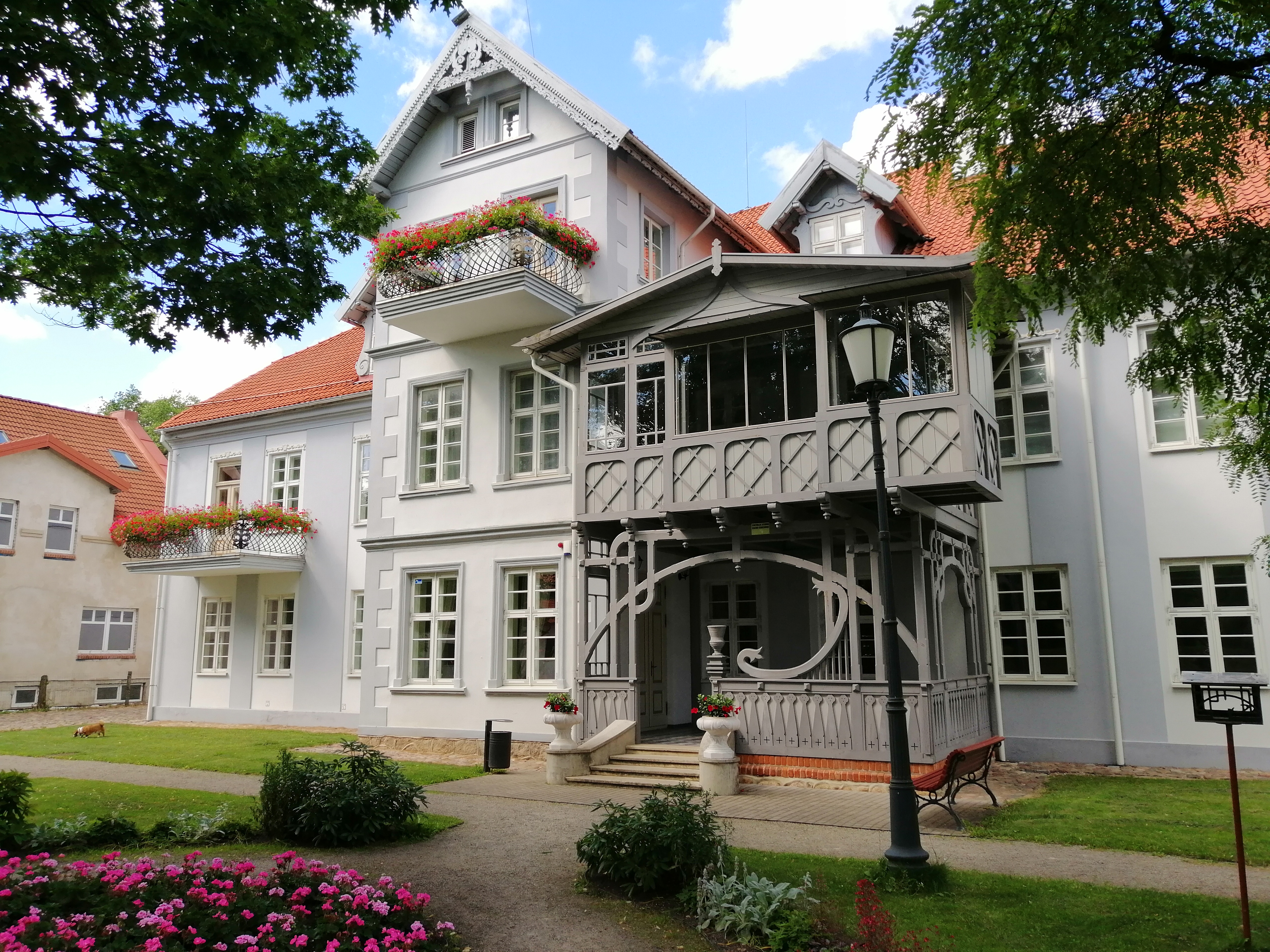
Šilutė

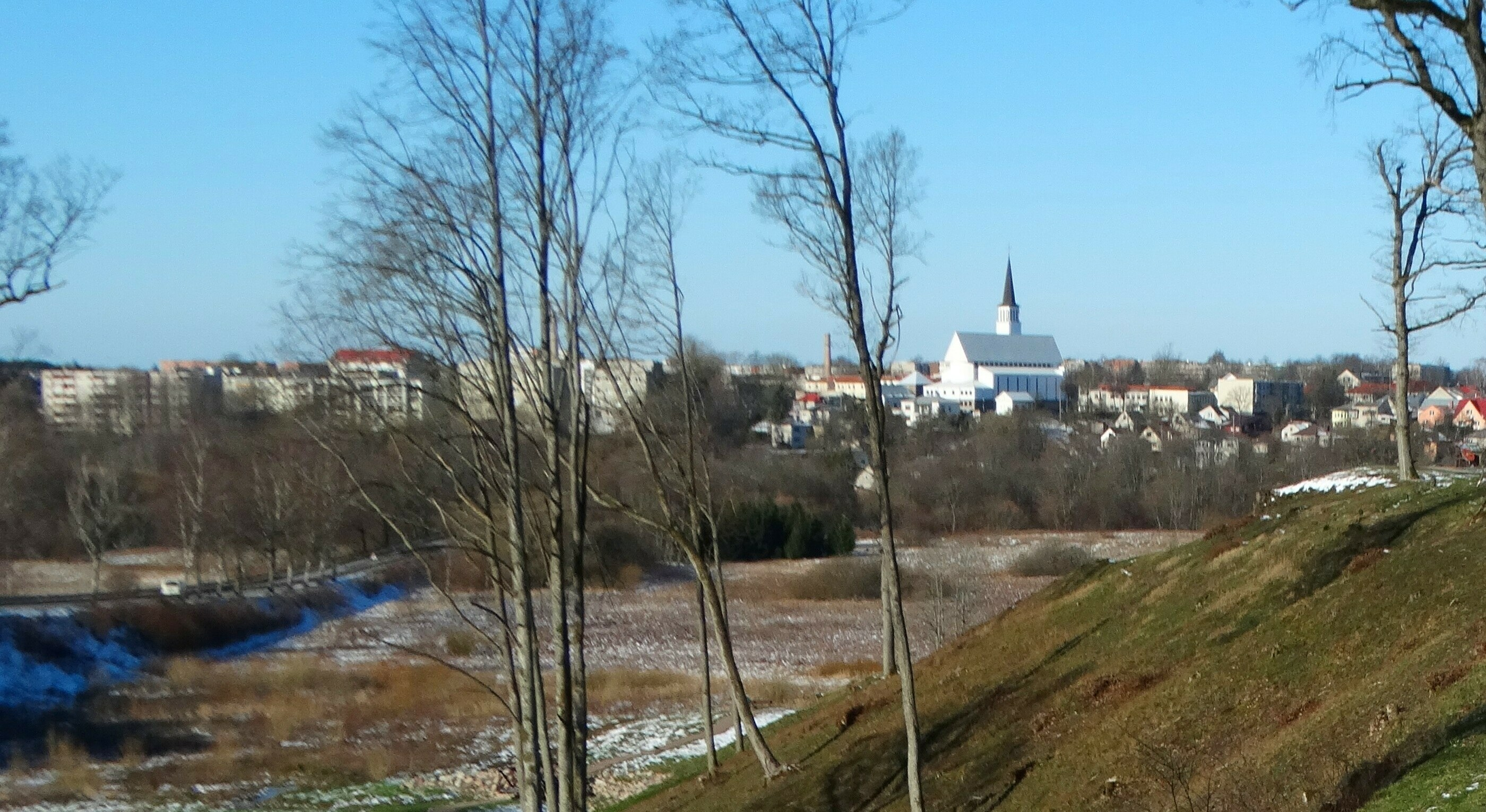
Gargždai

Druskininkai

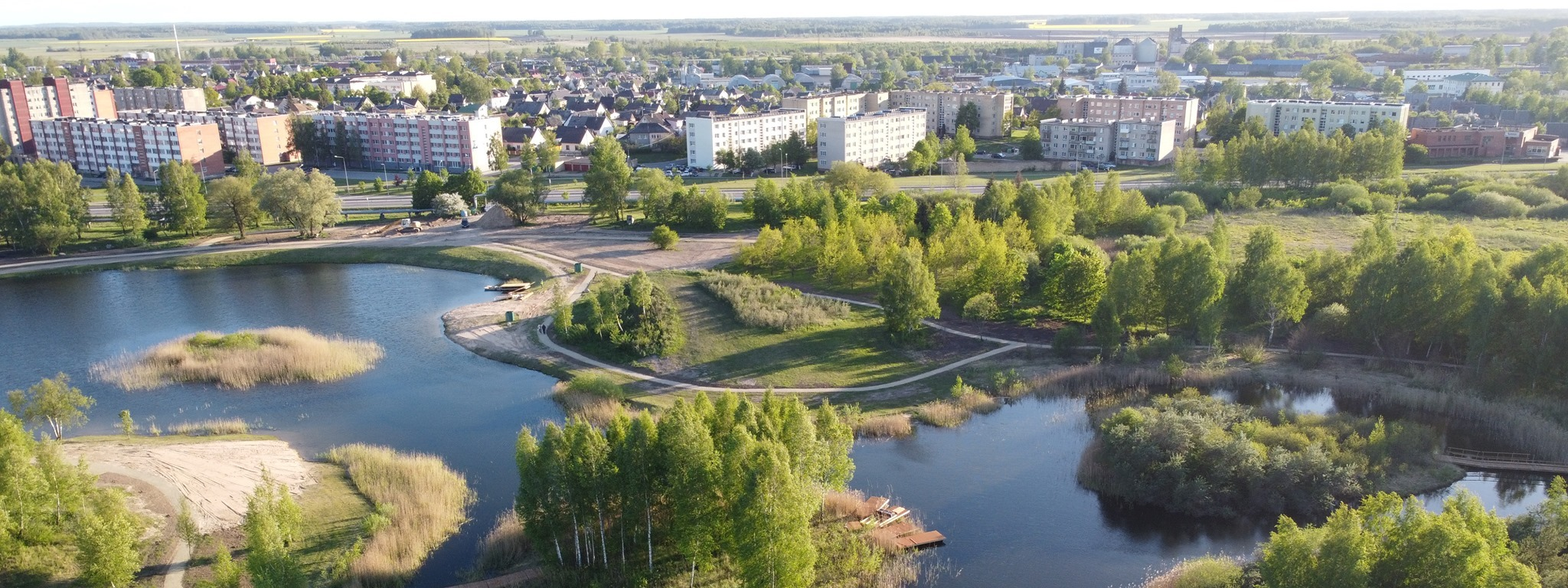
Radviliškis

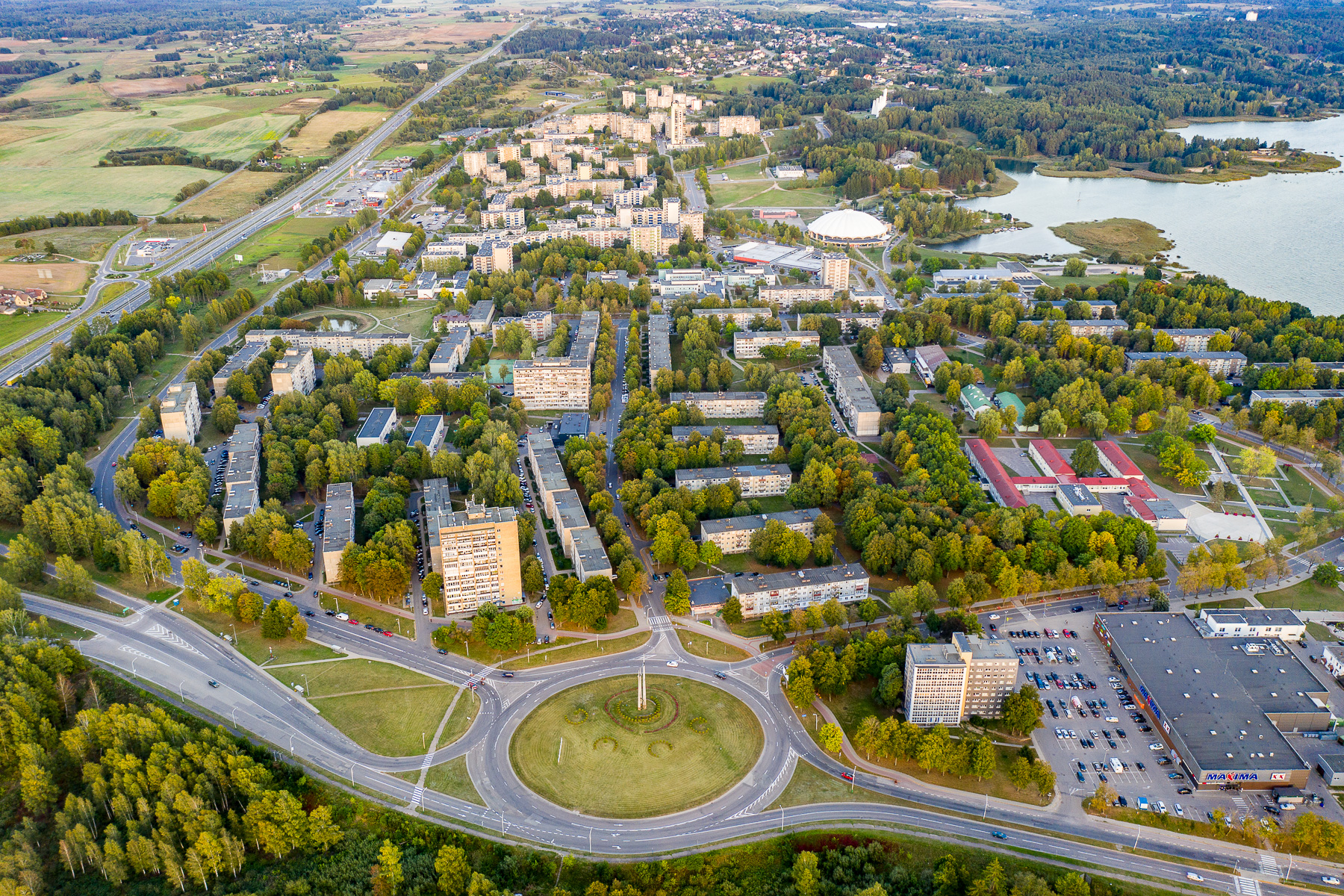
Elektrėnai

== Cities by compass direction reference ==
South-North reference: (Vilnius), E272 (Panevėžys), E67 (Bauska, Latvia)
CoA	City	Pronunciation (audio help)	Number by size (2024)	County	Municipalities
	Šalčininkai	Listen • Info	40	Vilnius County	Šalčininkai District Municipality
	Vilnius	Listen • Info	1	Vilnius County	Vilnius City Municipality, Vilnius District Municipality
	Širvintos	Listen • Info	45	Vilnius County	Širvintos District Municipality
	Ukmergė	Listen • Info	14	Vilnius County	Ukmergė District Municipality
	Panevėžys	Listen • Info	5	Panevėžys County	Panevėžys City Municipality, Panevėžys District Municipality
	Pasvalys	Listen • Info	41	Panevėžys County	Pasvalys District Municipality

== See also ==
- List of towns in Lithuania
- List of Lithuanian cities in other languages
- Administrative divisions of Lithuania
- Counties of Lithuania
- Municipalities of Lithuania
- Elderships of Lithuania
- Seniūnaitija

== Notes and sources ==
- Population sizes are given according to Department of Statistics to the Government of the Republic of Lithuania (Statistics Lithuania) data for the census of 2001.
- "City rights" means rights to self-government. For older cities this is usually the date when Magdeburg rights were granted. Most dates are obtained from Lithuanian Wikipedia which assembled the information from several different sources. One of the main sources was Population Statistics. This information cannot be completely trusted.
- Counties, municipalities and elderships are given according to Lithuanian Central Internet Gates data.
- Stasys Vaitiekūnas, Elena Valančienė, Lietuvos geografija (Geography of Lithuania), Alma littera, 2004, pages 160-162. ISBN 9955-08-534-7
- Lietuvos Respublikos teritorijos administracinių vienetų ir jų ribų įstatymas (Republic of Lithuania Law on Administrative Units and Their Borders), Seimas law database, June 19, 1994, law no. I-558.
- At the time of the 2001 census, there were 106 cities in Lithuania. The Government of the Republic of Lithuania has since made these changes:

- On December 16, 2002 Juodupė lost city status and became a town
- On February 25, 2003 Kulautuva lost city status and became a town
- On April 8, 2003 Tyruliai lost city status and became a town

- Cities with no image of a coat of arms shown do not have one confirmed by the President of Lithuania. Municipalities share coats of arms with their capitals, with the exception of cities which are capitals of more than one municipality (i.e. a city municipality and a district municipality), in which case the city municipality shares the coat of arms with the city, while the district municipality has its own distinct coat of arms. Another notable exception is Trakai town, which has different coat of arms from its municipality (Trakai District Municipality).
