= Dieveniškės Eldership =

Eldership of Lithuania

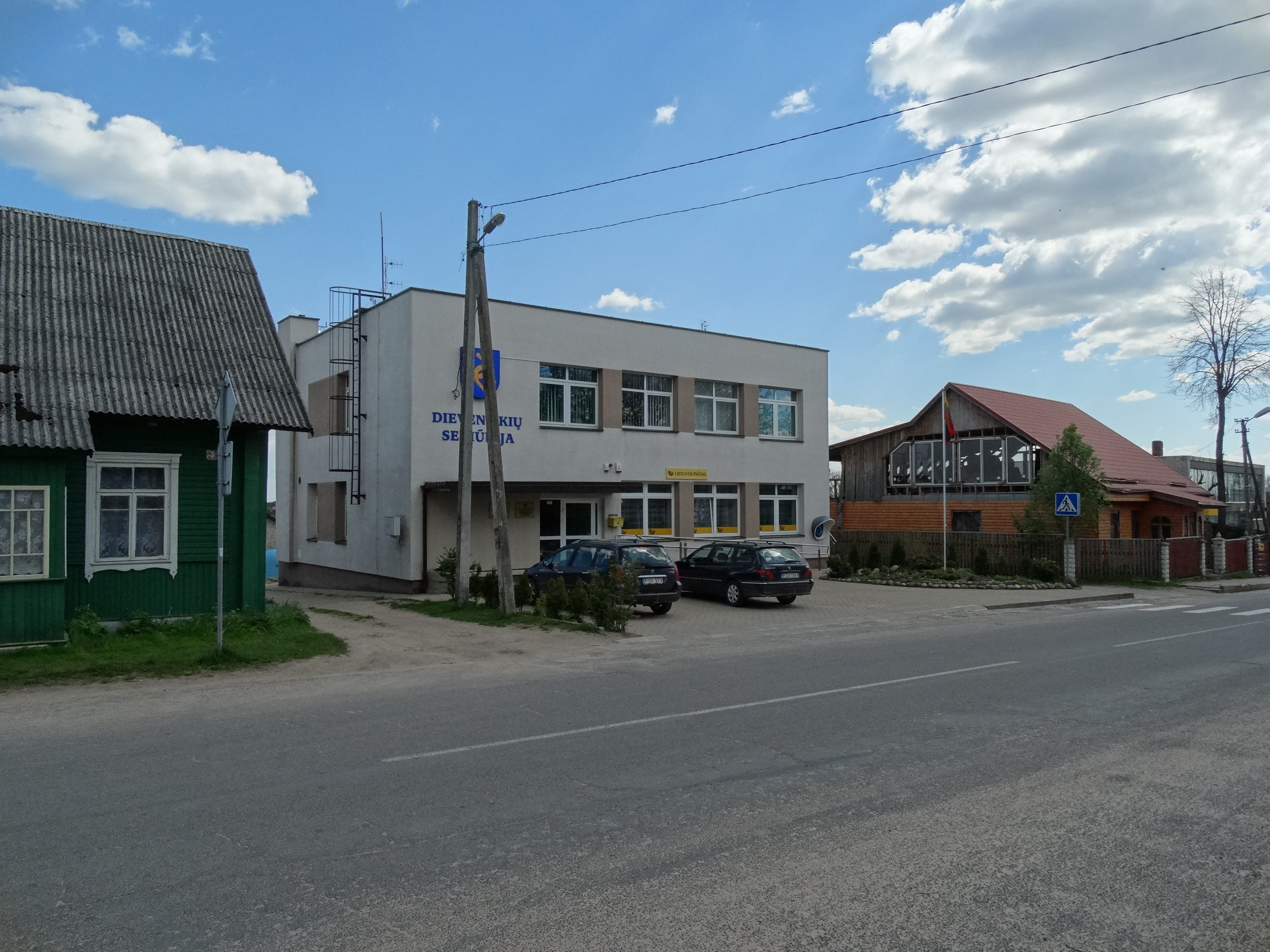
The Dieveniškės Eldership office

The Dieveniškės Eldership (Lithuanian: Dieveniškių seniūnija) is an eldership of Lithuania, located in the Šalčininkai District Municipality. In 2021 its population was 1585.
