= Gerviškės Eldership =

Eldership of Lithuania

The Gerviškės Eldership (Lithuanian: Gerviškių seniūnija) is an eldership of Lithuania, located in the Šalčininkai District Municipality. In 2021 its population was 1790.
