= Turgeliai Eldership =

Eldership of Lithuania

The Turgeliai Eldership (Lithuanian: Turgelių seniūnija) is an eldership of Lithuania, located in the Šalčininkai District Municipality. In 2021 its population was 1,953.
