= Butrimonys Eldership (Šalčininkai) =

Eldership of Lithuania

The Butrimonys Eldership (Lithuanian: Butrimonių seniūnija) is an eldership of Lithuania, located in the Šalčininkai District Municipality. In 2021 its population was 1483.
