= Tribonys =

Village in Lithuania

- Village
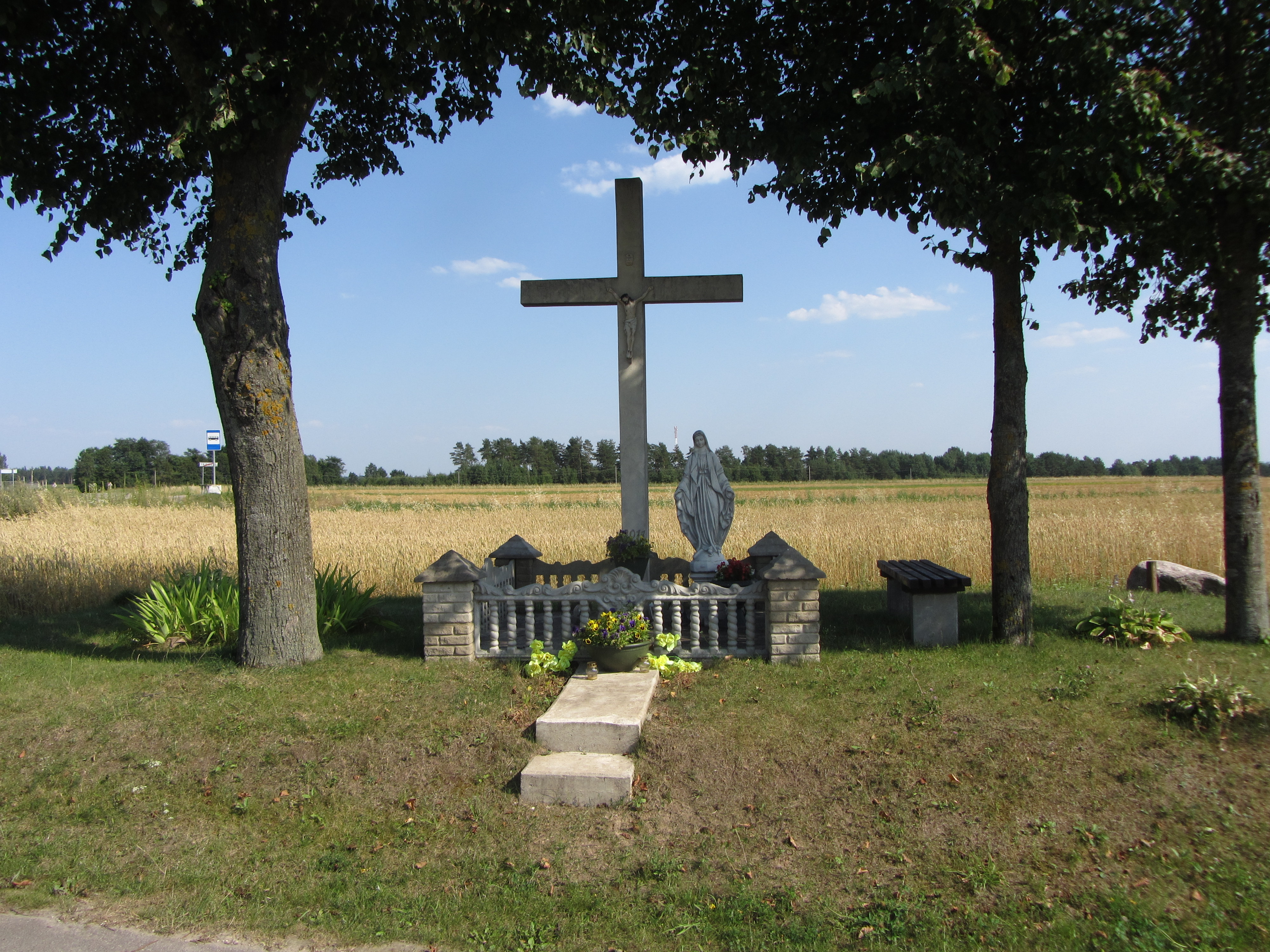
- Village cross

- Location within Lithuania
- Coordinates: 54.27°N 25.34°E

Tribonys is a village in Southern Lithuania. It is located in Šalčininkai District Municipality, Vilnus County. It had a population of 220 at the last census.
