= Poškonys =

- Village
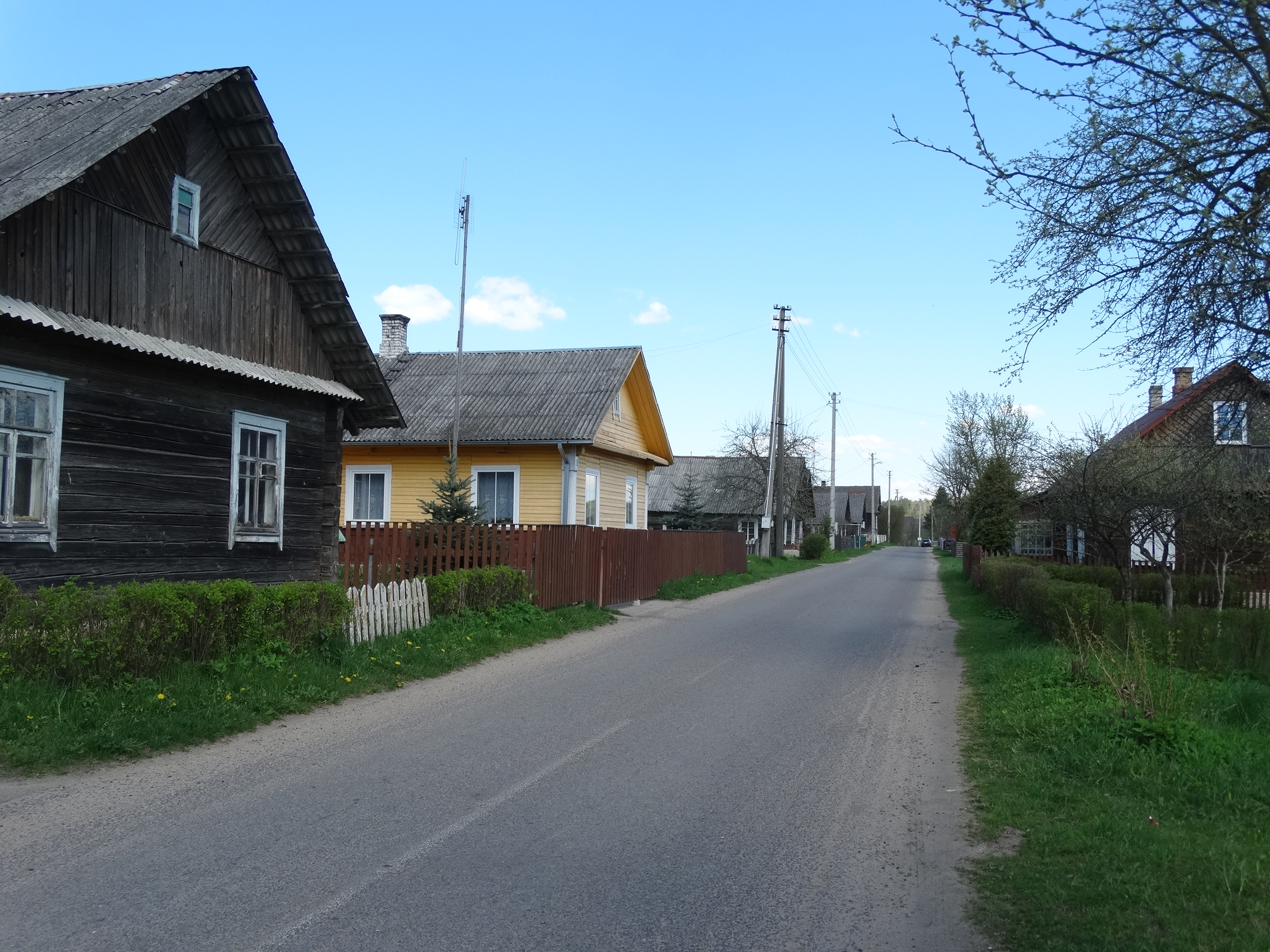

- Location of Poškonys
- Coordinates: 54°15′50″N 25°37′08″E
- Country: Lithuania
- County: Vilnius County
- Municipality: Šalčininkai District Municipality
- Eldership: Poškonys eldership

Population (2011)
  - Total: 129
- Time zone: UTC+2 (EET)
  - Summer (DST): UTC+3 (EEST)

Poškonys [poʃ'koːnʲiːs] is a village in Vilnius County, 14 kilometres (8.7 mi) southeast of Šalčininkai, Lithuania, in the so-called Dieveniškės appendix. While the inhabitants of Dieveniškės appendix are mostly Polish by ethnicity, Poškonys from the old days had a Lithuanian majority. The village itself belongs to an ethno-cultural reserve and has an architectural monument status. There's a museum full of traditional Lithuanian craft, various household items, and a protected stone at the crossroad of Lastaučikai village. The 2011 census recorded a population of 129 living in Poškonys.
