= Jašiūnai Eldership =

Eldership of Lithuania

The Jašiūnai Eldership (Lithuanian: Jašiūnų seniūnija) is an eldership of Lithuania, located in the Šalčininkai District Municipality. In 2021, its population was 3,545.
