= Baltoji Vokė =

- Town
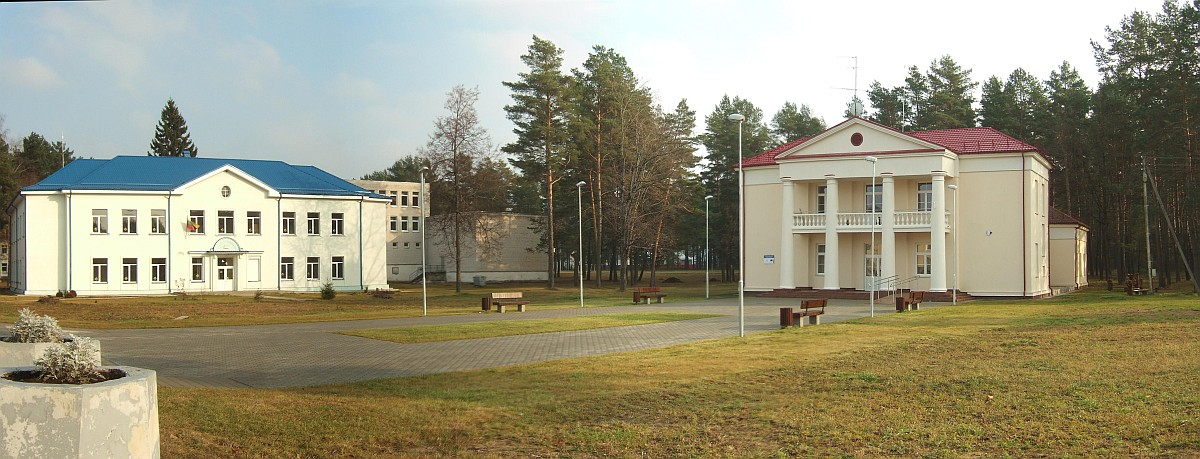

- Coat of arms

- Location of Baltoji Vokė
- Coordinates: 54°27′0″N 25°8′0″E
- Country: Lithuania
- Ethnographic region: Dzūkija
- County: Vilnius County
- Municipality: Šalčininkai district municipality
- Eldership: Baltoji Vokė eldership
- Capital of: Baltoji Vokė eldership
- Grantedcity rights: 1958

Population (2022)
  - Total: 980
- Time zone: UTC+2 (EET)
  - Summer (DST): UTC+3 (EEST)

Baltoji Vokė (formerly known in Lithuanian as Naujoji Žagarinė; Belarusian: Белая Вака, Biełaja Vaka; Polish: Biała Waka) is a city in Šalčininkai District Municipality, Vilnius County, Lithuania. It is located 30 km (19 mi) west from Šalčininkai.

In 2011, the town had a population of 1101. Most of its inhabitants were Poles - 58,13% (640), followed by Lithuanians – 23,71% (261), Russians - 11,26% (124) and Belarusians - 3,45% (38).

The reported population decreased to 998 people in the 2021 Lithuanian census.
