= Šalčia =

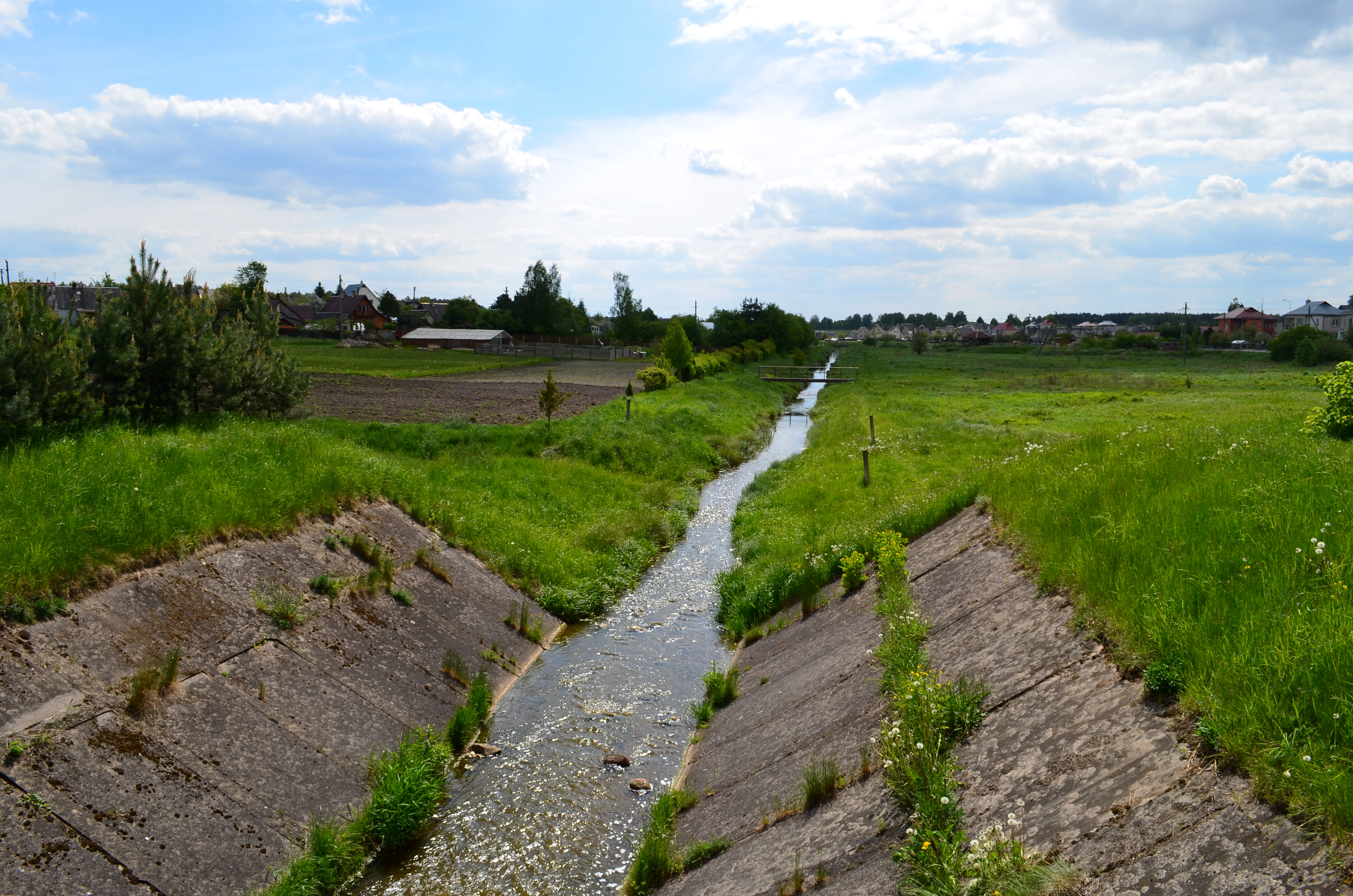
- Šalčia in Šalčininkai

Location
- Country: Lithuania and Belarus

Physical characteristics
- Source
  - location: Šalčininkai district
- Mouth: Merkys
  - coordinates: 54°20′44″N 24°49′57″E
- Length: 76 km (47 mi)
- Basin size: 749 km^{2} (289 sq mi)
- Discharge
  - average: 5.72 m^{3}/s (202 cu ft/s)

Basin features
- Progression: Merkys→ Neman→ Baltic Sea

The Šalčia (Belarusian: Шальча, romanized: Shalcha) is a river in Lithuania. It originates in a region located to the east of Šalčininkai and runs for 76 km before flowing into the Merkys near Valkininkai.
