= Pandėlys =

- City
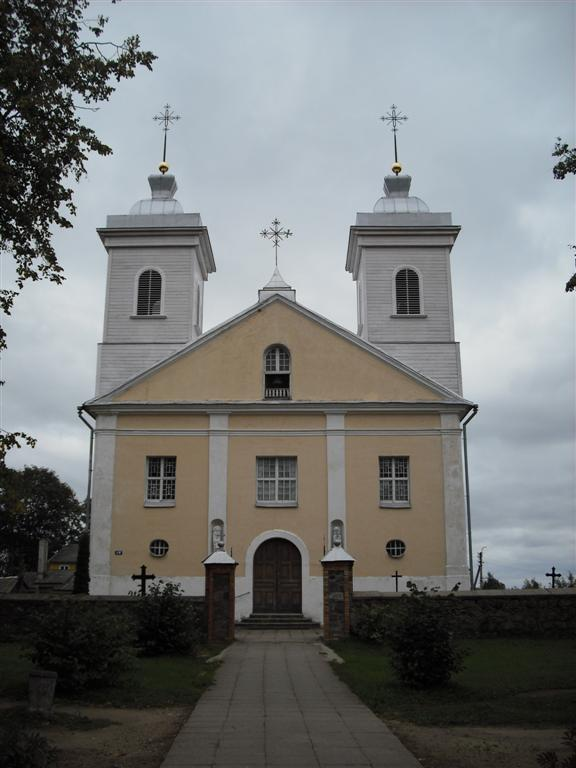
- The church of Pandėlys

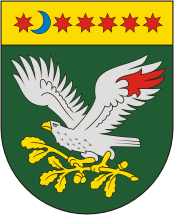
- Coat of arms

- Location of Pandėlys
- Coordinates: 56°1′0″N 25°13′0″E
- Country: Lithuania
- Ethnographic region: Aukštaitija
- County: Panevėžys County
- Municipality: Rokiškis district municipality
- Eldership: Pandėlys eldership
- Capital of: Pandelys eldership
- First mentioned: 1591
- Granted city rights: 1956

Population (2005)
  - Total: 985
- Time zone: UTC+2 (EET)
  - Summer (DST): UTC+3 (EEST)

Pandėlys is a city in northern Lithuania. It is located some 26 km (16 mi) west from Rokiškis, on the road to Biržai. Apaščia River originates near the town and flows through it.

== History ==
The origins of the name are associated with trade. One explanation goes that the name was derived from a word meaning "warehouse." Merchants from Vilnius and Riga would meet and exchange the goods somewhere in the area. Lithuanians called their storage places podėlis and Latvians – pondėlis. The other explanation claims that the name comes from panedėlis – Monday, the day of the week when the market was open.

The town is first mentioned in 1591. The manor belonged to the Rajecki family, who sold it to the Kościałkowskis in 1767. The new owners, Stumbrai, demolished the manor. Only a park is left, planted according to Italian traditions. Ignacy Kościałkowski built a brick church in 1801. Antanas Strazdas, a famous poet, worked for short period in the church. The city had an important Chasidic Jewish community before their murder in 1941; before the First World War, the population numbered approximately 150 Jewish families and 50-60 Christian families. Today, an important Jewish cemetery is still visible.
