= Gauja (Neman) =

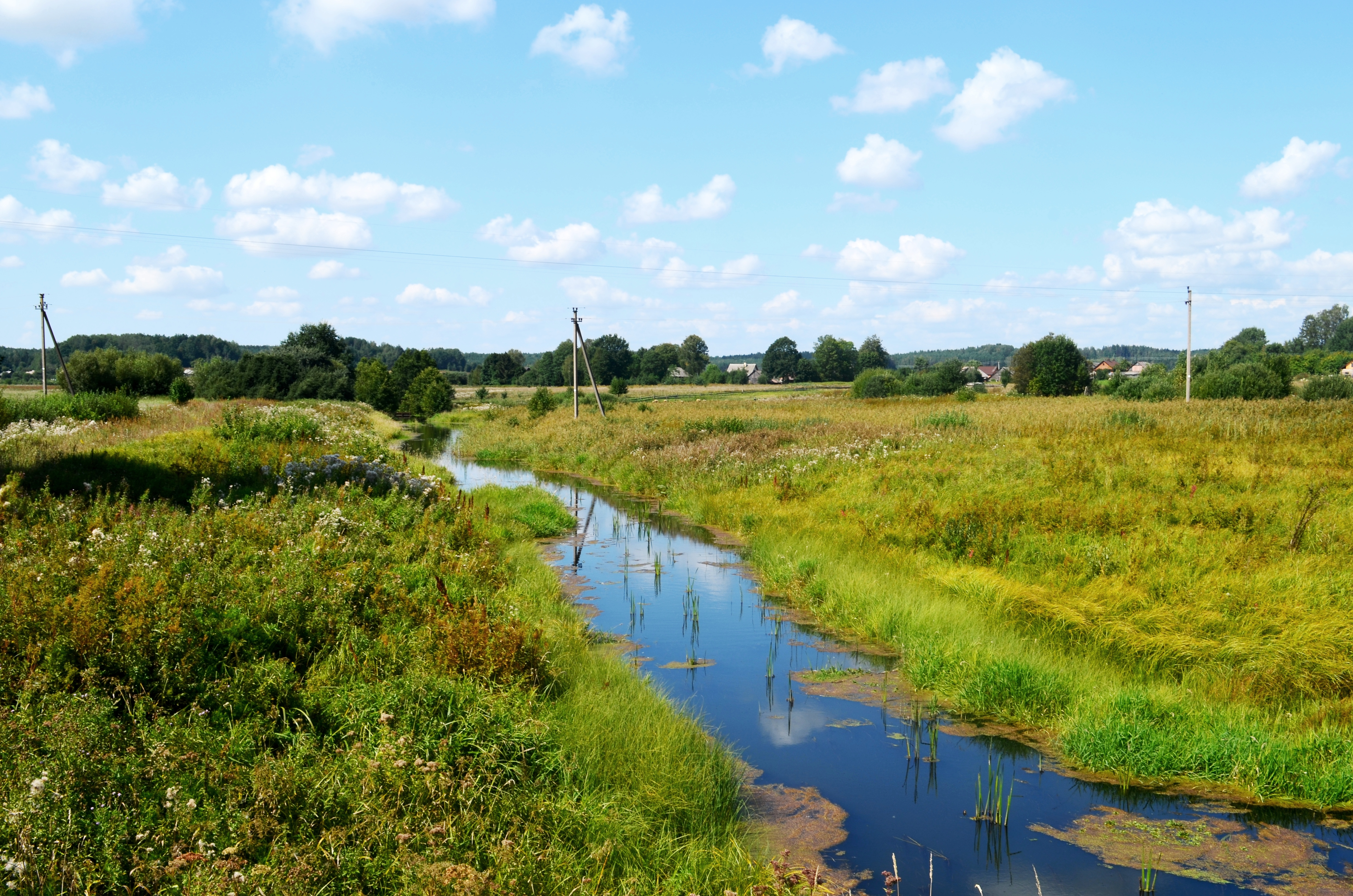

Location
- Country: Lithuania, Belarus

Physical characteristics
- Source
  - location: Iwye district
- Mouth: Neman
  - coordinates: 53.8312°N 25.5936°E
- Length: 94 km (58 mi)
- Basin size: 1,677 km^{2} (647 sq mi)

Basin features
- Progression: Neman→ Baltic Sea

The Gauja (in Lithuanian; Belarusian: Гаўя, Hawya; Russian: Гавья, Gav’ya) is a river in southern Lithuania and western Belarus. The 94-kilometer long Gauja drains a 1,677 km^{2} (647 sq mi) basin. It is a right tributary of the Neman.
