= Šalčininkai =

Šalčininkai Soleczniki (Polish)
- City
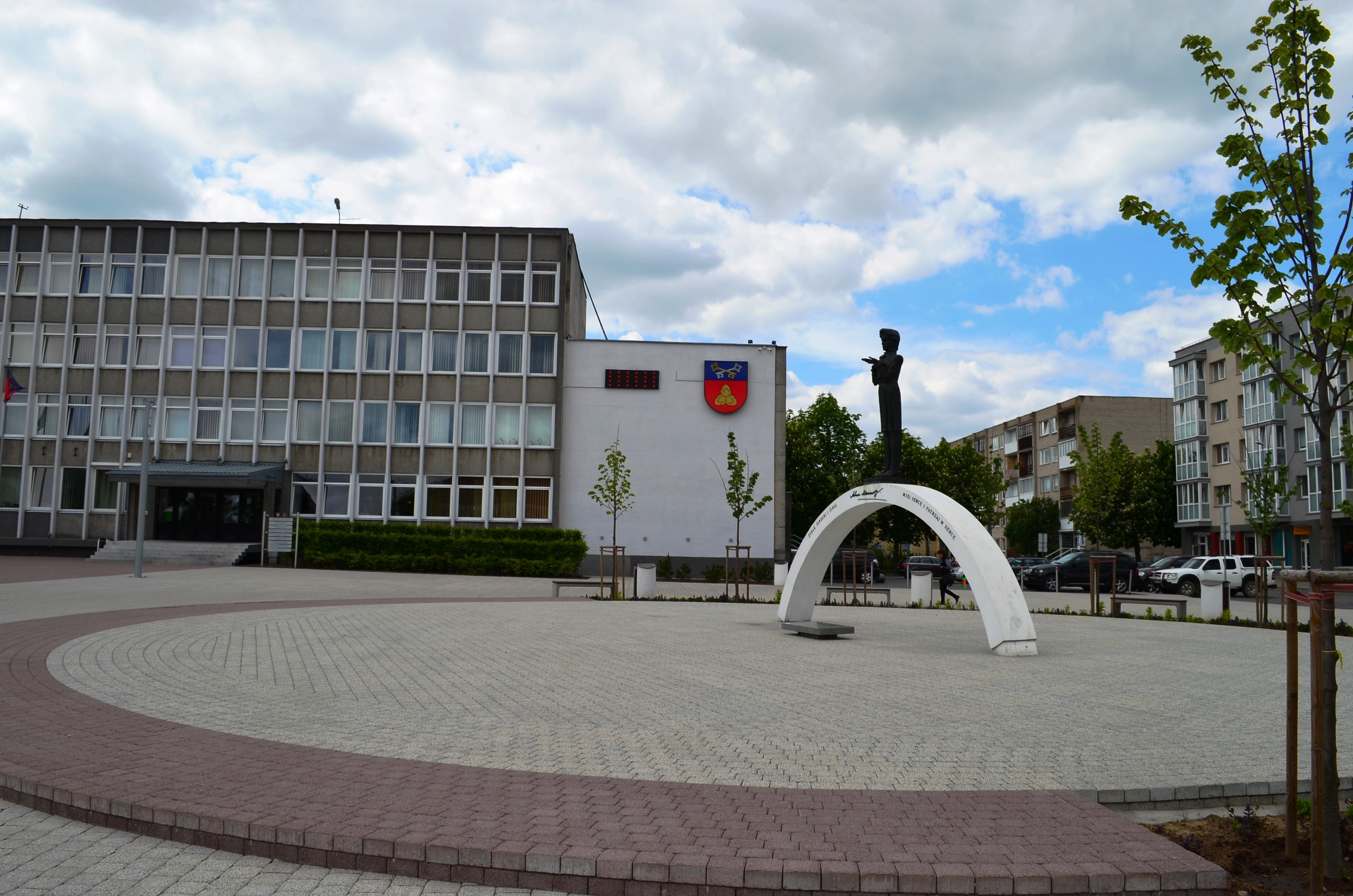
- City centre with monument to Adam Mickiewicz

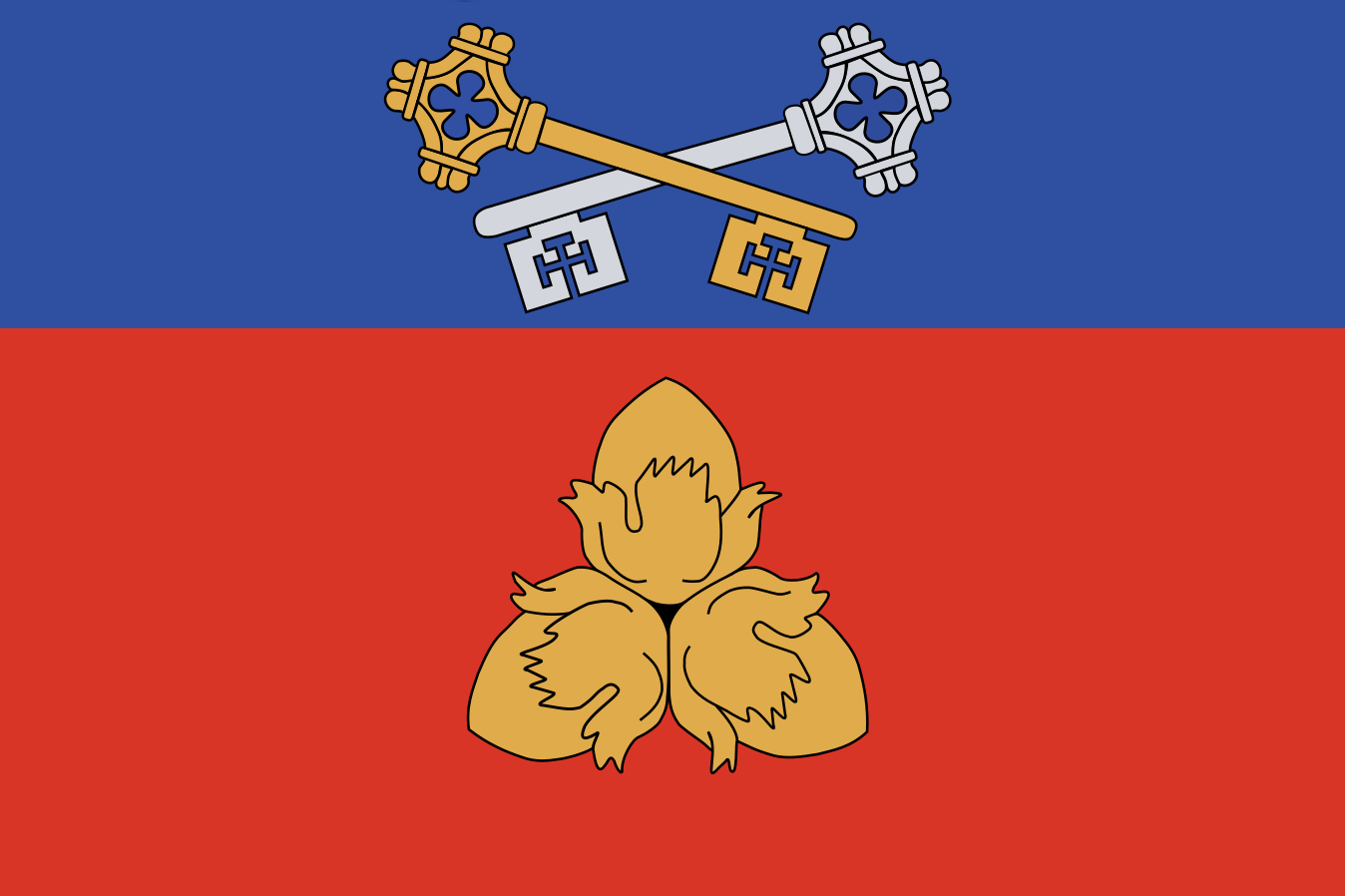
- Flag Coat of arms

- Location of Šalčininkai
- Coordinates: 54°19′0″N 25°23′0″E
- Country: Lithuania
- Ethnographic region: Dzūkija
- County: Vilnius County
- Municipality: Šalčininkai district municipality
- Eldership: Šalčininkai eldership
- Capital of: Šalčininkai district municipality Šalčininkai eldership
- First mentioned: 1311
- Granted town rights: 1956

Area
  - Total: 3 km^{2} (1.2 sq mi)

Population (2021)
  - Total: 6,857
- Time zone: UTC+2 (EET)
  - Summer (DST): UTC+3 (EEST)

Šalčininkai (Lithuanian pronunciation: [ˈʃaːlʲt͡ɕɪnʲɪŋkɐɪ̯]; Polish: Soleczniki; Solechnik; Belarusian: Салечнікі) is a city in Vilnius County, in south-eastern Lithuania, situated south-east of Vilnius, near the border with Belarus.

== Etymology ==
The name of the city derives from Šalčia river, šalta meaning cold in Lithuanian.

== History ==
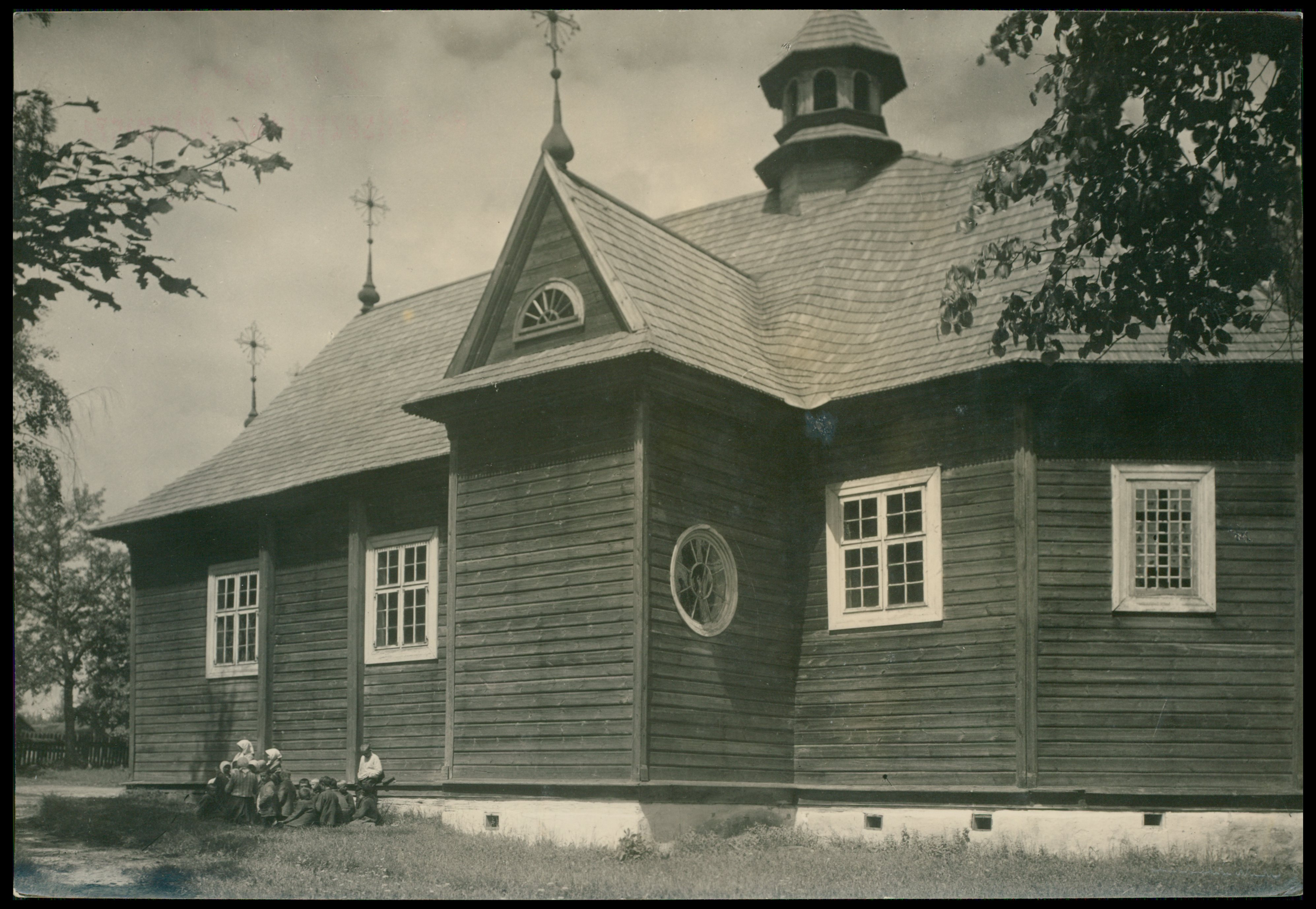
Church in 1937

In the medieval period the region around Šalčininkai was dominated by Lithuanians and it was the birthplace of many authors of the earliest Lithuanian-language texts (including Stanislovas Rapalionis, Jurgis Zablockis and Aleksandras Rodūnonis). In 1420, Lithuanian-speaking Nicholas of Šalčininkai was born in Šalčininkai and in 1453–1467 he served as the Bishop of Vilnius, the capital of the Grand Duchy of Lithuania.

In the late 19th century many of the local inhabitants mixed with the neighbouring Belarusians and called themselves tutejszy ("the locals"), while staying Catholics, they didn't assign themselves to a single ethnic group.

The region is known for its uncodified Belarusian vernacular (also known as 'po prostu', meaning 'simply' or 'plainly') and the city itself is considered the provincial centre of Polish culture in Lithuania (the urban centre being Vilnius).

Šalčininkai attained the town status in 1956 and is now a capital of the Šalčininkai district municipality.

== Demographics ==
According to the latest census of 2021, Šalčininkai had 6857 inhabitants and features a multi-ethnic population of 4930 Poles (71.9%), 920 Lithuanians (15.7%), 438 Russians (6.4%), 286 Belarusians (4.2%), 61 Ukrainians (0,9%) and 222 people of other background (3.2%). 12.2% of all inhabitants in Šalčininkai district municipality, according to the 2021 census were born abroad, while 87.8% were born in Lithuania. This was a decrease from 14.3%, recorded by the previous – 2011 census. Out of 34.5 thousand inhabitants in 2011, 3711 or 10.7% of all the inhabitants were born in Belarus, 728 or 2.1% in Russia.

In 2000 coat of arms of Šalčininkai was adopted by a decree of the President of the Republic of Lithuania, designed by Arvydas Každailis, coat of arms consists of three hazelnuts symbolizing solidarity.

== Notable people ==
- Władysław Kozakiewicz (born 1950), Polish pole vaulter and Olympic champion
- Henoch Leibowitz
- Aaron Soltz

== Twin towns – sister cities ==
Šalčininkai is twinned with:

- Bełchatów County, Poland
- Hude, Germany
- Kadzidło, Poland
- Kaźmierz, Poland
- Kętrzyn County, Poland
- Łomża, Poland
- Łowicz, Poland
- Nowe Miasto Lubawskie, Poland
- Płońsk, Poland
- Radom County, Poland
- Stare Miasto, Poland
- Świdnik, Poland
- Szczytno, Poland
- Tarnowo Podgórne, Poland
- Warsaw West County, Poland
- Wolsztyn County, Poland
- Wschowa, Poland
- Żnin, Poland
