= Šalčininkai District Municipality =

Coordinates: 54°20′13″N 25°22′52″E

Šalčininkai District Municipality Šalčininkų rajono savivaldybė
- Municipality
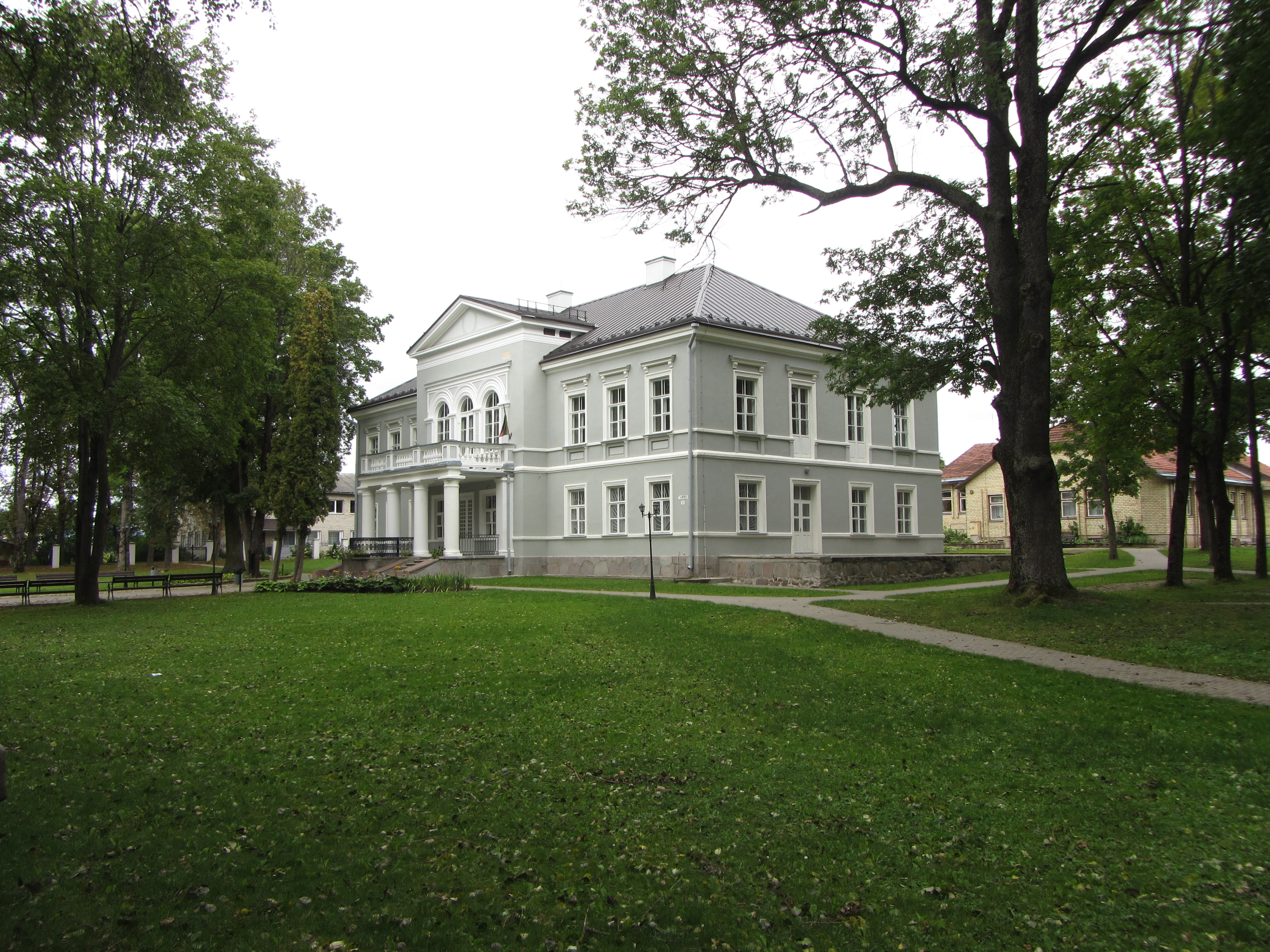
- Šalčininkai Manor

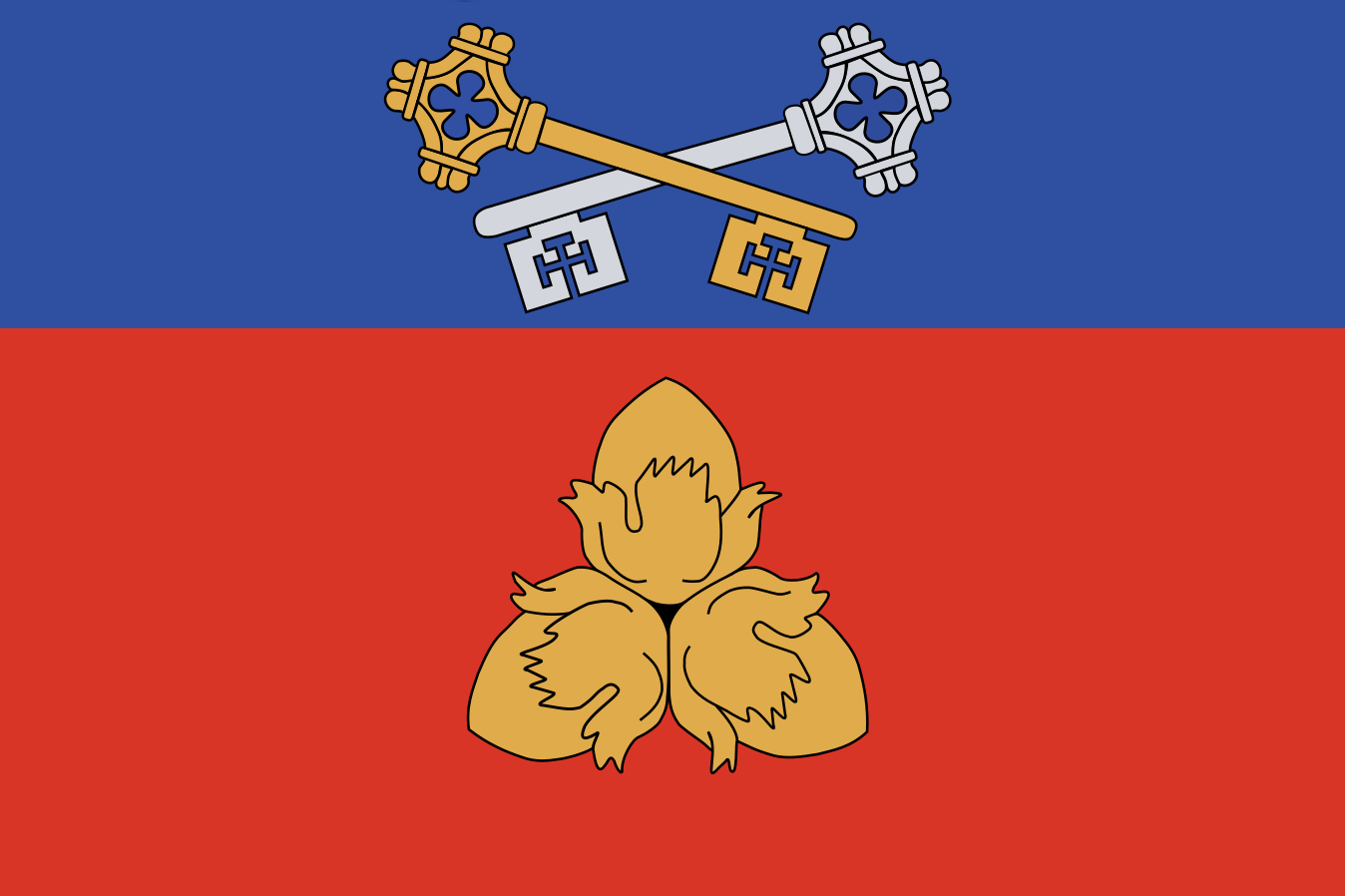
- Flag Coat of arms

- Location of Šalčininkai District Municipality

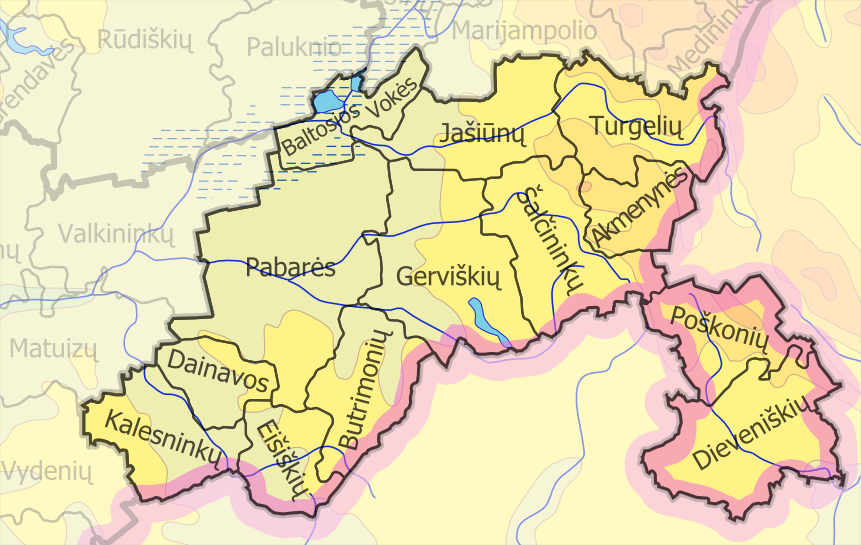
- Map of Šalčininkai district municipality
- Country: Lithuania
- Ethnographic region: Dzūkija
- County: Vilnius County
- Capital: Šalčininkai
- Elderships: List: Akmenynė; Baltoji Vokė; Dainava; Dieveniškės; Eišiškės; Gerviškės; Jašiūnai; Kalesninkai; Pabarė; Poškonys; Šalčininkai; Turgeliai

Area
  - Total: 1,491 km^{2} (576 sq mi)

Population (2024)
  - Total: 29,913
  - Density: 20.06/km^{2} (51.96/sq mi)
- Time zone: UTC+2 (EET)
  - Summer (DST): UTC+3 (EEST)
- Major settlements: Šalčininkai (pop. 6,702); Eišiškės (pop. 2,869)
- Website: www.salcininkai.lt

Šalčininkai District Municipality (Lithuanian: Šalčininkų rajono savivaldybė, Polish: Rejon Solecznicki) is one of 60 district municipalities in Lithuania. The municipality is part of the Vilnius County and is located in southeastern Lithuania, next to the Belarus–Lithuania border. The south-eastern border of the municipality with Belarus includes a distinctive salient of Lithuanian territory, known as the Dieveniškės appendix, almost completely surrounded by Belarus.

Šalčininkai is the largest town and the administrative center of the district with its newly built quarters, while the second largest town is Eišiškės, a more historical town, which was the center of the district and the largest town before 1972.

It has a Polish majority population, with three-quarters of the population claiming Polish ethnicity.

== History ==
=== Soviet occupation ===
Šalčininkai district was formed in 1950, from 34 apylinkės of the abolished Vilnius county. The district's area was 957 km². In 1950–53, the Šalčininkai district was part of the Vilnius region. In 1962, Šalčininkai and Eišiškės districts were merged into one and named Eišiškės district, while five neighborhoods were transferred to the Varėna district. In 1972, Eišiškės district was renamed to Šalčininkai district. There were two towns (Eišiškės, Šalčininkai) in the district in 1974.

Years	Number of apylinkės in the district	Source
1954–1972	17	
1976	16	
1979	14	
1986	13	
1989	12	

The Šalčininkai district's official Communist newspaper was called Lenin's Precepts (Russian: Заветы Ленина, romanized: Zavety Lenina; Polish: Przykazania Lenina; Lithuanian: Lenino priesakai) and published in three languages: Russian, Polish and Lithuanian. Although officially, the absolute majority of the district's residents were Poles, as many as 8,000 of the inhabitants were subscribed to the Russian-language newspaper, while only one and a half thousand - to the Lithuanian and Polish language versions. The newspaper spread hostile misinformation towards the re-emerging independent Lithuanian state of Lithuania in all language versions of its issues.

=== 1990s ===
On 11 March 1990, when the Supreme Council of Lithuania declared the Act of the Re-Establishment of the State of Lithuania, some non-Lithuanians in the Vilnius Region, mostly members of the Communist Party of the Soviet Union, began actively creating a separatist territorial entity under Moscow's inspiration and guidance. From 1988 to 21 August 1991, the autonomists of the Šalčininkai and Vilnius districts organized three congresses of the Poles of the Vilnius region. In order to disrupt the Lithuanian state at that time, both aforementioned district councils adopted dozens of anti-state resolutions. For example, by the decision of the Šalčininkai district council, as many as 384 of the district's young men were taken into the Soviet army during one and a half years and the work of the Lithuanian border guards was sabotaged in various ways. During this period, all Lithuanian government decisions were blocked in Vilnius and Šalčininkai districts. The autonomists acted brazenly, because of Moscow's direct support and because they were aided by the Soviet army, which was still stationed on Lithuanian soil. The attempts to create a Polish autonomy in the Vilnius Region collapsed when the Moscow-led Soviet leadership, which was the project's main supporter, collapsed in the 1991 Soviet coup d'état attempt.

In 1995, the Šalčininkai district municipality was established instead of the Šalčininkai district.

== Geography ==
Geographically, the eastern part of the district is in the Ashmyany Highlands, the western part is in the Southeast Plain, while the southwestern part is in the Eišiškės Plateau. The highest place (265 m (869 ft 5 in)) is near Katkuškės, the lowest (121 m (397 ft 0 in)) is near Šalčia, near the boundary between the Šalčininkai and the Varėna district municipalities.

Through the district flows the river Merkys and its tributaries Šalčia and Verseka, as well as the Nemunas tributary Gauja. In the Šalčininkai district, there are 3 lakes and 13 ponds. The Poškonys Reservoir (Poškonių tvenkinys) with an area of 0.3 km^{2} on the Gauja River is located in the district.

Forest coverage is 48%, with pine forests prevailing. The biggest forest is the Rūdninkai forest. The most important mineral deposits are gravel (Jašiūnai, Pabarė, Navakonys, Mantviliškės, Mikališkės), sand (Pabarė).

Lithuanian Route 104 passes through the district.

=== Climate ===
The average temperature in January is -4.5 °C, while in July it is 17 °C. Annual rainfall is 650 mm.

== Demographics ==
=== Ethnicity ===
Ethnic groups in the Šalčininkai District Municipality (2001–2021)
Ethnic group	2021		2011		2001	
Ethnic group	Pop.	%	Pop.	%	Pop.	%
Poles	22,933	76.3	26,858	77.75	31,223	79.48
Lithuanians	3,789	12.6	3,746	10.84	4,086	10.4
Russians	1,517	5.05	1,858	5.38	1,948	4.96
Belarusians	857	2.85	1,162	3.36	1,139	2.9
Ukrainians	174	0.58	226	0.65	253	0.64
Romani/Gypsies	/	/	82	0.24	105	0.27
Tatars	/	/	28	0.08	33	0.08
Germans	/	/	13	0.03	9	0.02
Latvians	/	/	10	0.02	13	0.03
Others	161	0.54	53	0.15	75	1.34
Not indicated	621	2.07	487	1.41	398	1.01
Total	30,052	100	34,544	100	39,282	100

== Bibliography ==
- Bartoševičienė, Valė (2018-12-14). "Šalčininkų rajono savivaldybė". vle.lt (in Lithuanian).
- Skaržinskas, Česlovas (2016-12-01). "Šaltoje Šalčios žemėje" [In the cold land of Šalčia]. Bernardinai (in Lithuanian).
