= Sablauskių Reservoir =

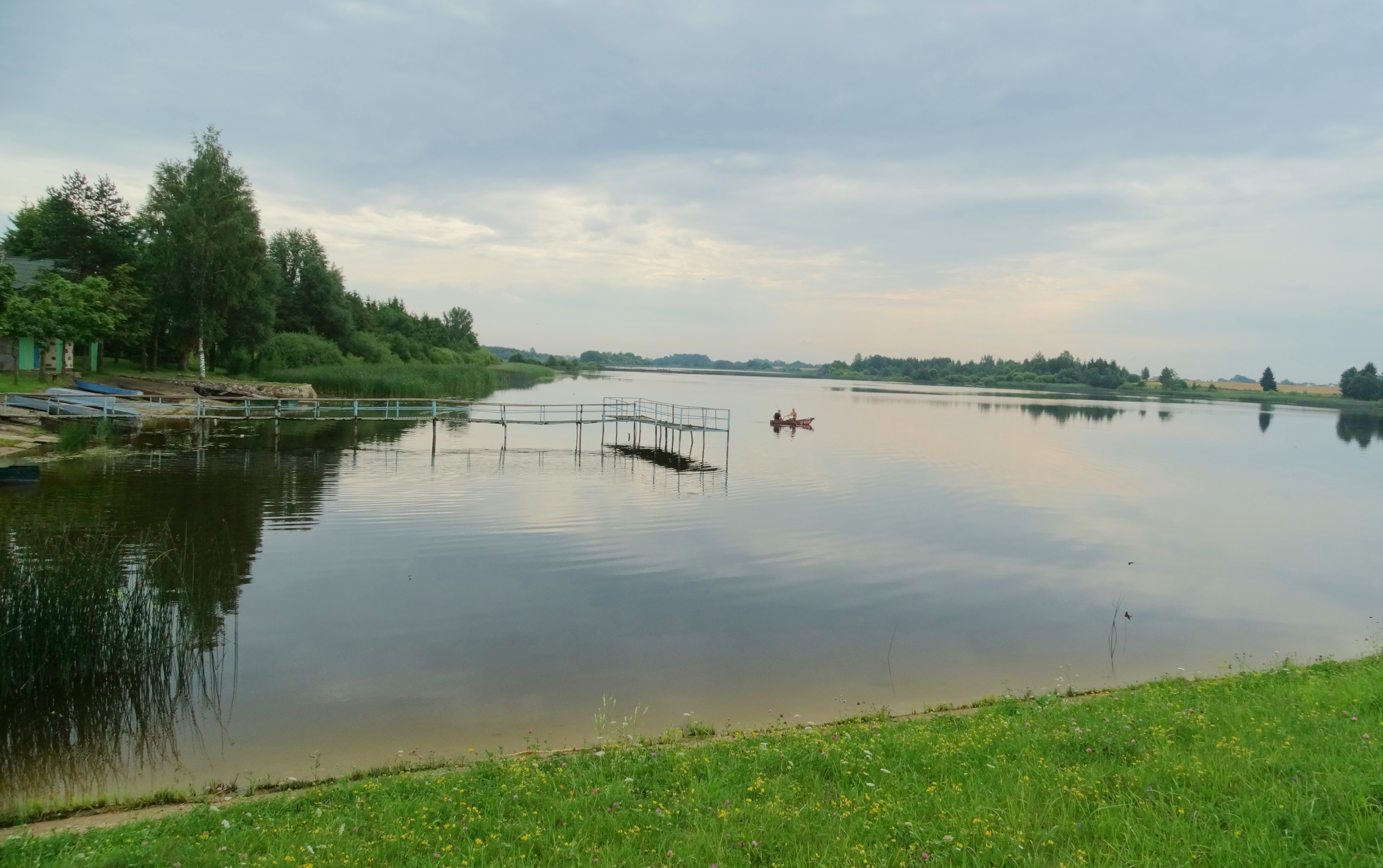
- Sablauskių Reservoir in the summer

- Location within Lithuania
- Location: Sablauskiai, Akmenė District Municipality
- Coordinates: 56°15′27″N 22°52′48″E
- Lake type: Artificial lake, reservoir
- Primary inflows: Dabikinė, Šventupys (Dabikinė), Debrestis, Drūktupis, Daugupis, Kusupis, Pusupis, Lapupis
- Primary outflows: Dabikinė
- Basin countries: Lithuania
- Max. length: 5.9 km (3.7 mi)
- Max. width: 0.4 km (0.25 mi)
- Surface area: 1,227 km^{2} (474 sq mi)
- Average depth: 1.6 m (5 ft 3 in)
- Max. depth: 3.5 m (11 ft)
- Water volume: 0.002 km^{3} (0.00048 cu mi)
- Shore length^{1}: 19.71 km (12.25 mi)
- Surface elevation: 69 m (226 ft)
- ^{1} Shore length is not a well-defined measure.

The Sablauskių Reservoir is a reservoir in Lithuania, in the Akmenė District Municipality. The reservoir is 7 km (4.3 mi) from Akmenė and 1.4 km (0.87 mi) from Alkiškiai. The shores are almost entirely covered in trees and bushes, with the shore itself being very winding. On the northern and eastern banks of the reservoir, there are forested areas. Around the reservoir there are many cultivated fields, a rural tourism homestead can be found here too.

== History ==
The Sablauskių Reservoir was created in 1975 for industrial water supply and in 2007 a 39 kW small hydroelectric power plant was built.
