= Agluona (Akmenė) =

- Location within Lithuania

Location
- Country: Lithuania
- Location: Akmenė district municipality

Physical characteristics
- Source
  - location: Naujoji Akmenė
  - elevation: 43 m (141 ft)
- Mouth
  - location: Vadakstis
  - coordinates: 56°21′6″N 22°40′52″E
- Length: 23.4 km (14.5 mi)
- Basin size: 188 km^{2} (73 sq mi)
- Discharge
  - average: 1.24 m^{3}/s (44 cu ft/s)

Basin features
- Tributaries
  - left: Žaras, Vėžupis
  - right: Bradaulis, Kališupis, Paisė, Molupis, Kirgas

The Agluona is a river of Akmenė district municipality, Lithuania. It flows for 23.4 kilometres and has a basin area of 188 km^{2}. It is a left tributary of the Vadakstis river (the Venta River basin).

The Agluona starts near Stipirkiai village and flows north-westwards. It meets the Vadakstis near Kesiai village, by the Latvian border.

By the Agluona, lies the village of Kivyliai where the Kivyliai Reservoir is located (area 81 hectares (200 acres)).

The name Agluona comes from Lithuanian: eglė, aglė 'spruce tree'.
