= Sablauskiai =

- Village
- Location within Lithuania
- Coordinates: 56°14′50″N 22°52′10″E
- Country: Lithuania
- County: Šiauliai County
- Municipality: Akmenė district municipality
- Eldership: Naujoji Akmenė

Population (2011)
  - Total: 422
- Time zone: UTC+2 (EET)
  - Summer (DST): UTC+3 (EEST)

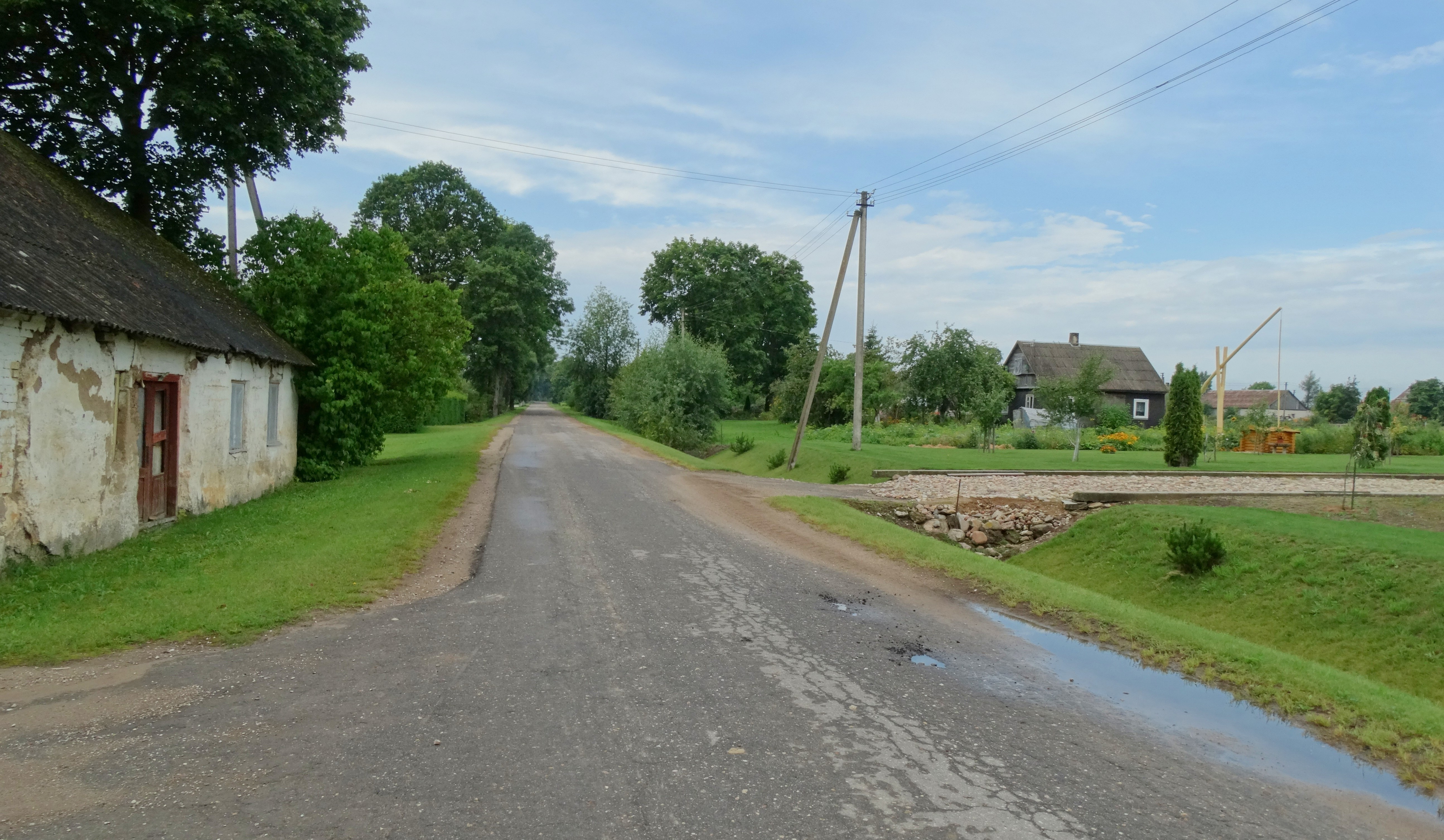

Sablauskiai is a village in the centre of the Akmenė district municipality, in Šiauliai County, in northwest Lithuania. The Sablauskių Pagrindinė Mokykla can be found here. The village is 16 km (9.9 mi) northeast of Venta and is near the river of Šventupys. The 1013 Alkiškiai–Sablauskiai–Barsiukai road goes through Sablauskiai. According to the 2011 census, Sablauskiai has a population of 422 people. The village is famous for limestone sources and the reservoir named after the village (Sablauskių Reservoir).
