= Venta =

Venta may refer to:

== Architecture ==
- Venta (establishment), a Spanish typical inn generally located in unpopulated and remote rural areas.

== Places ==
- Venta (river), a river in Lithuania and Latvia
- Venta (city), a city in Lithuania
- Venta (village), a village in Lithuania
- Venta (catamaran), a 1973 Latvian catamaran
- Venta, Common Brittonic for "market" or "town" in Iron Age Britain, used particularly for:
  - Venta Belgarum (Venta of the Belgae), the Roman town of Winchester in England
  - Venta Icenorum (Venta of the Iceni), the Roman town of Caistor St Edmund in England
  - Venta Silurum (Venta of the Silures), the Roman town of Caerwent in Wales

== People ==
- Javi Venta (born 1975), Spanish footballer
- Krishna Venta (1911–1958), American cult leader

== See also ==
- La Venta (disambiguation)
