= Žerkščiai =

- Village
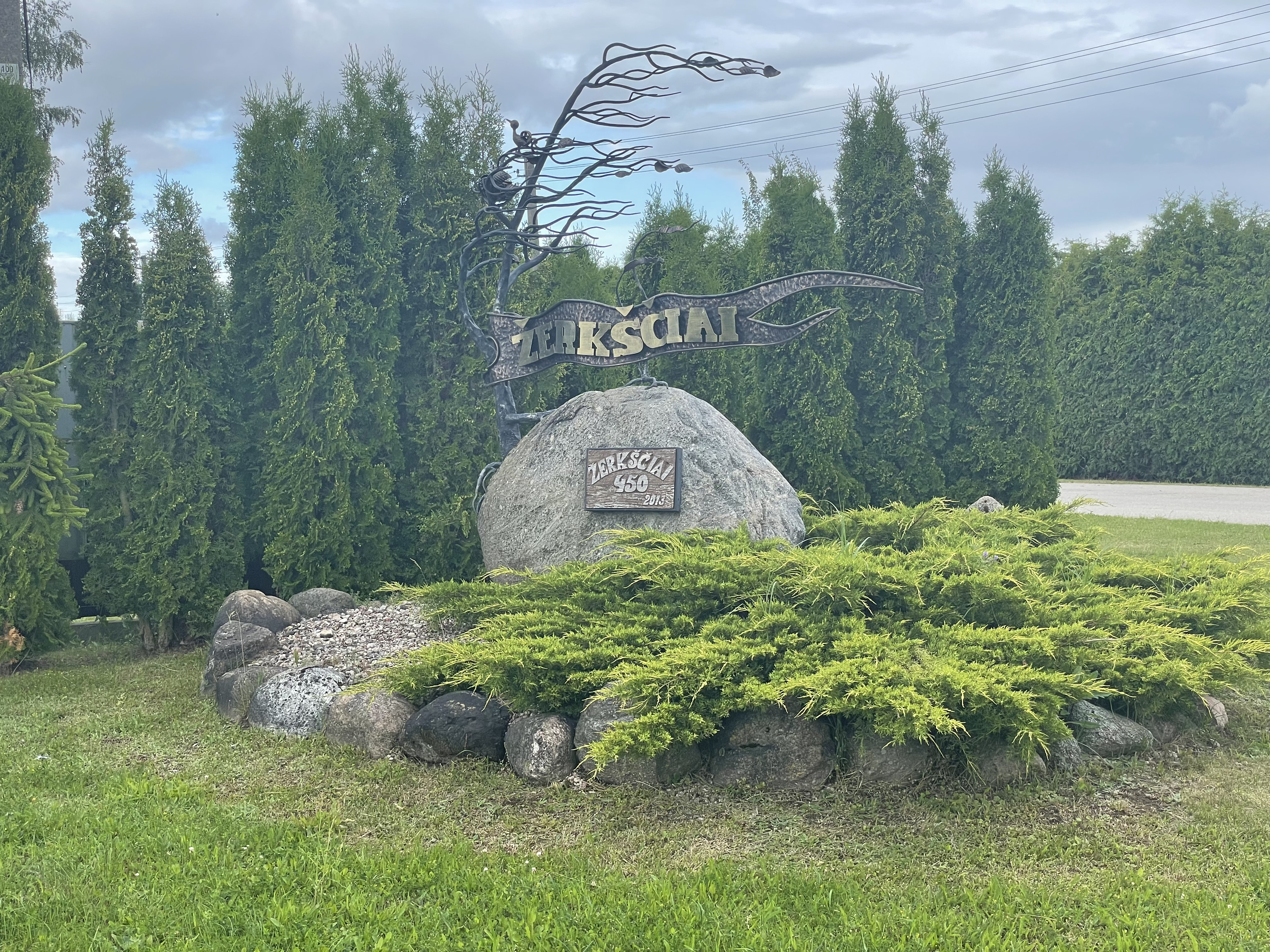

- Location of Žerkščiai
- Coordinates: 56°10′N 22°41′E
- Country: Lithuania
- County: Šiauliai County
- Municipality: Akmenė District Municipality

Population (2021)
  - Total: 218
- Time zone: UTC+2 (EET)
  - Summer (DST): UTC+3 (EEST)

Žerkščiai is a small village the western part of Akmenė District Municipality, Lithuania. It is located 1 km southwest of Venta, on the opposite bank of the river Venta.

== Population ==
The population of Žerkščiai has remained roughly the same throughout the past 100 years, with its peak being in 2011 with 317 inhabitants and its lowest being 95 in 1970. Between 1979 and 1989, the population grew more due the neighbouring city of Venta opening up a lime and later a brick factory creating more job opportunities.

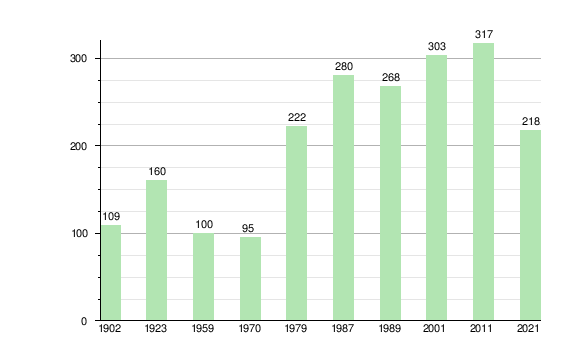
Population graph of Žerkščiai
