= Eglesys =

Eglesys River

Physical characteristics
- Mouth: Venta
  - location: Klaišių Forest
  - coordinates: 56°11′45″N 22°40′12″E
- Length: 13.9 km (8.6 mi)
- Basin size: 34.6 km^{2} (13.4 sq mi)

The Eglesys is a Lithuanian river in the Akmenė district. It begins in the Klaišiai forest near the village of Baubliai (Akmenė District). It flows westward and northwestward, parallel to the Venta (river), into which it debouches. Its name originates from the Lithuanian tree name eglė ('spruce').
