= Church of the Immaculate Conception of the Blessed Virgin Mary, Venta =

Church of the Immaculate Conception of the Virgin Mary
- Ventos Švč. Mergelės Marijos Nekaltojo Prasidėjimo bažnyčia
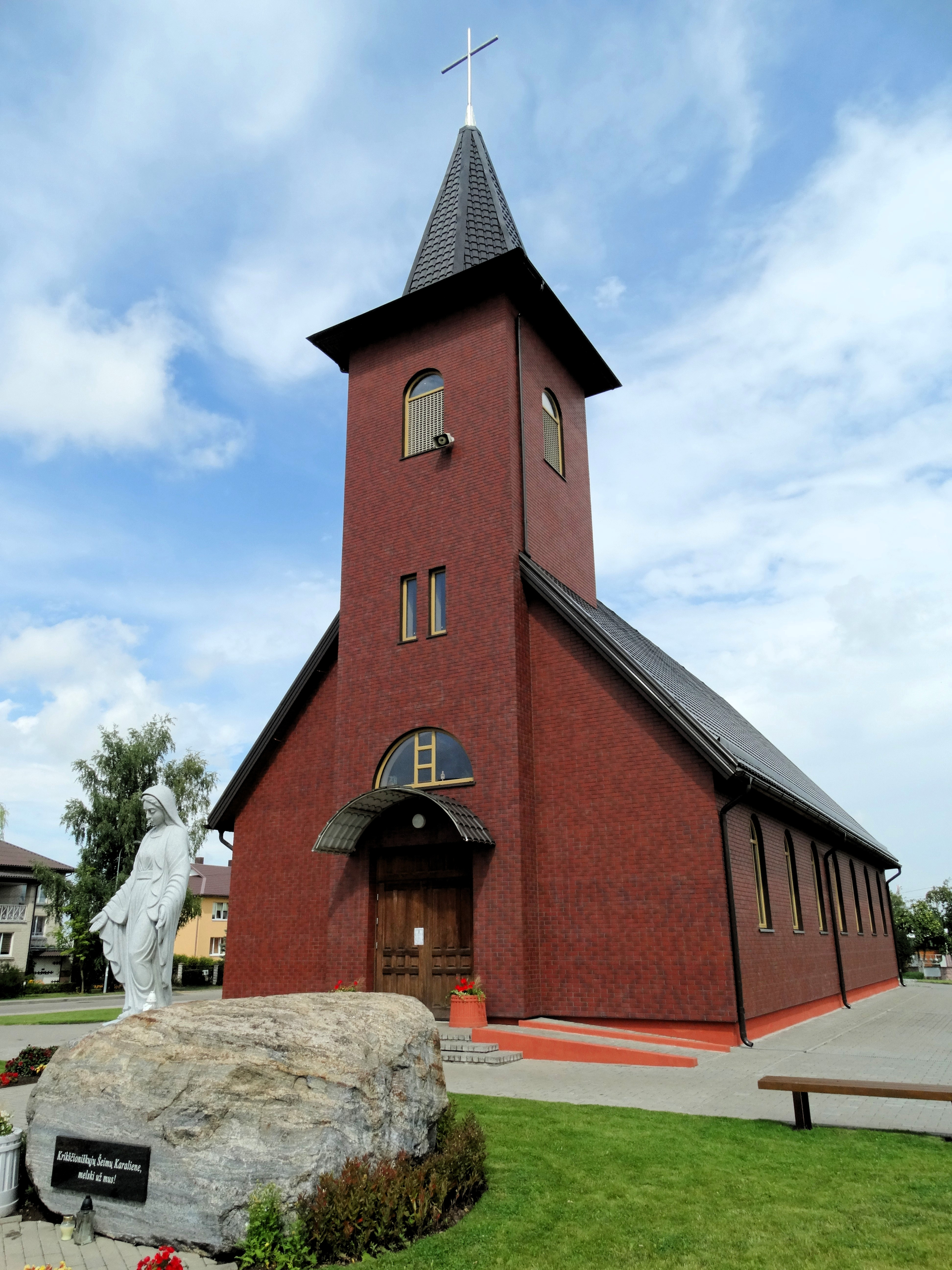
- The church in 2015
- Church of the Immaculate Conception of the Virgin Mary
- 56°11′25″N 22°41′19″E
- Location: Venta, Lithuania
- Denomination: Catholic

History
- Founded: 1991

Architecture
- Architect(s): Vytautas Marcinkus and Regina Miceikienė of the Šiauliai Komproject
- Completed: 2009

Specifications
- Materials: Masonry

Administration
- Diocese: Diocese of Telšiai
- Deanery: Akmenė

The Church of the Immaculate Conception of the Virgin Mary (Lithuanian: Ventos Švč. Mergelės Marijos Nekaltojo Prasidėjimo bažnyčia) is a Roman Catholic church in Venta, Akmenė District, Lithuania, which was constructed in 2009. It belongs to the Diocese of Telšiai.

== History ==
In 1991, the parish was founded and a temporary house of prayer was established in a former kindergarten. The church was built and completed in 2009. Its main patrons were the family of Ivanas Paleičikas.

The church is also called the Lithuanian Millennium Church because it was the only church built in Lithuania in 2009.

The church was designed by architects Vytautas Marcinkus and Regina Miceikienė, and built by Akmeresta using German sourced materials.

== Architecture ==
The building is frame and white brick, rectangular plan with one non-projecting tower, and a three-walled apse. The facades have thermal insulation finishing panels. The church has a rectangular tower, and two bays with a pyramidal roof. The windows are mainly semi-circular and arched. The interior is rear, with one nave. There is no ceiling, and expressive constructions are suspended in their place. The church bell was brought by the pastor Anupras Gauronskas from Germany.
