= Venta (village) =

- Village
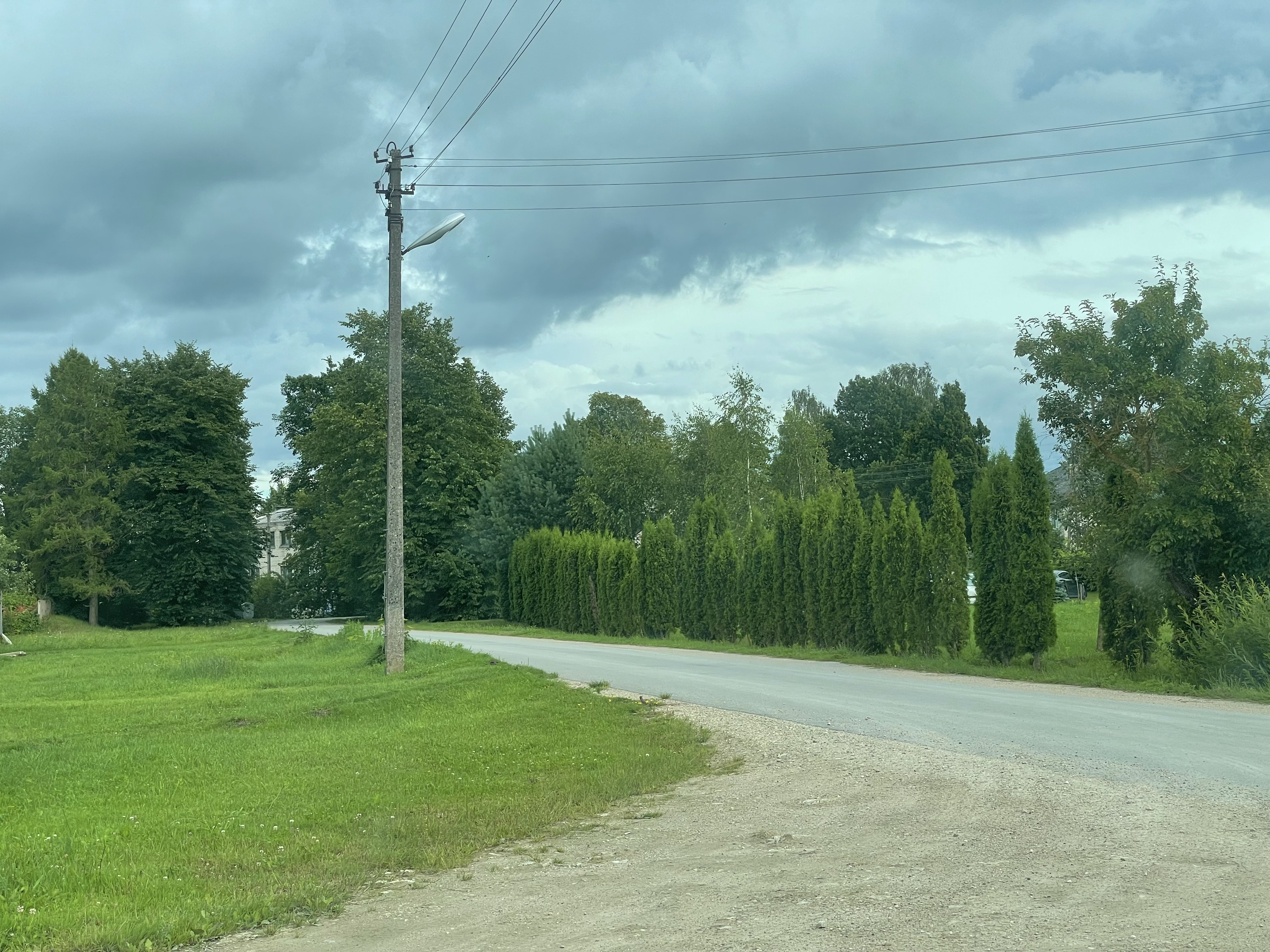

- Location of Venta
- Coordinates: 56°12′7″N 22°41′2″E
- Country: Lithuania
- County: Šiauliai County
- Municipality: Akmenė District Municipality
- Eldership: Venta Eldership

Population (2021)
  - Total: 226
- Time zone: UTC+2 (EET)
  - Summer (DST): UTC+3 (EEST)

Venta is a village northwest of the city of Venta in the southwest of the Akmenė District Municipality, Lithuania. It is situated on the road 156 Naujoji Akmenė–Venta. It is also the place where the companies UAB "Ventos Meistrai" and UAB "Viking Industrier" operate.

== Population ==
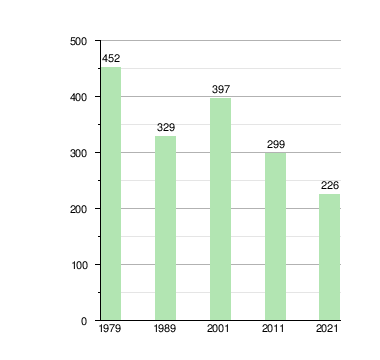
A population graph of Venta village

Venta's population peaked in 1979 with 452 residents and was at its lowest in 2021 with 226.
