= Dabikinė =

River in Latvia

Coordinates: 56°13′26″N 22°37′6″E

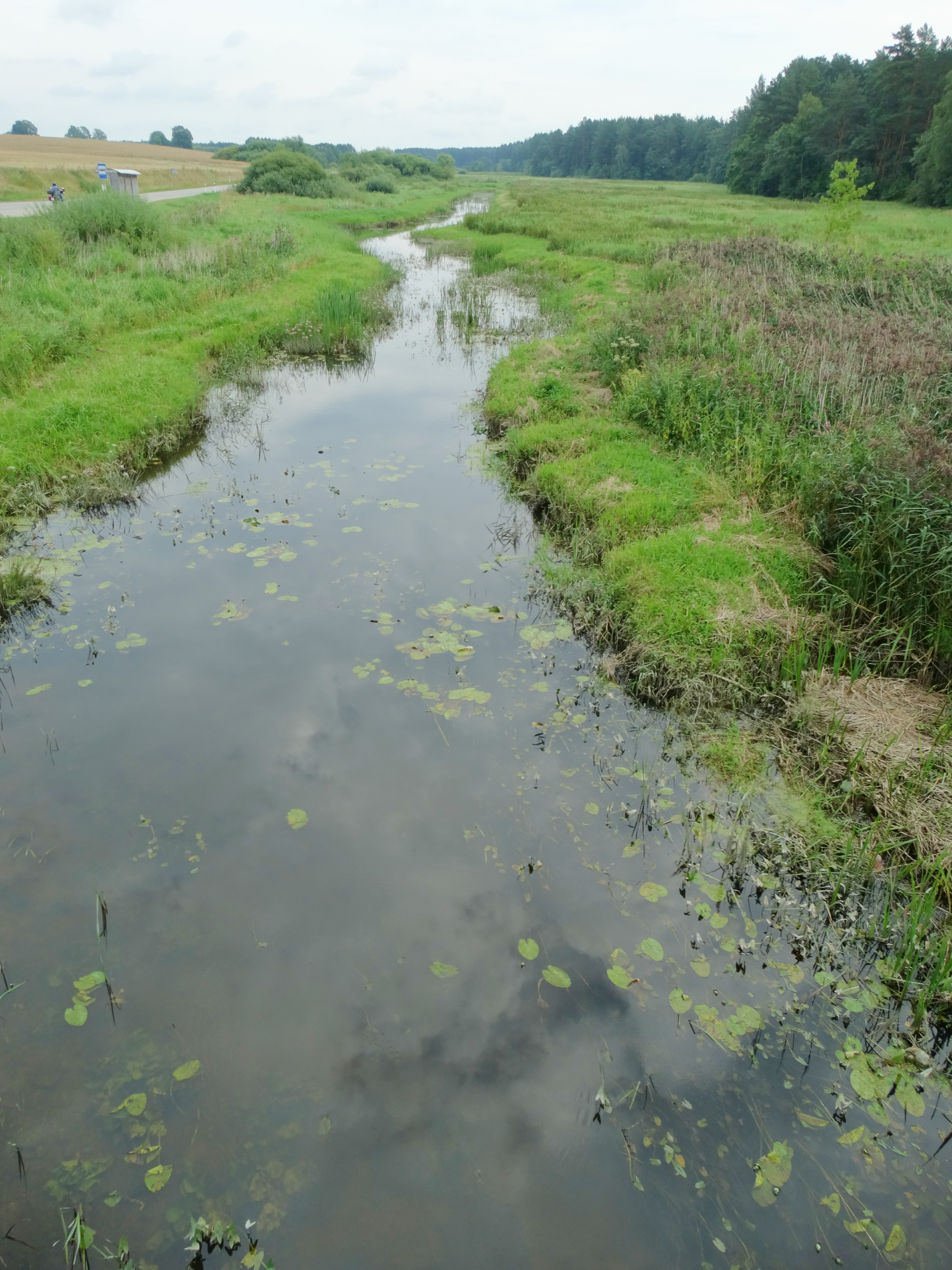

Location
- Countries: Latvia, Lithuania
- Locations: Akmenė district municipality, Šiauliai County

Physical characteristics
- Mouth
  - location: Venta
- Length: 37.2 km (23.1 mi)
- Basin size: 387.6 km^{2} (149.7 sq mi)
- Discharge
  - average: 2.39 m^{3}/s (84 cu ft/s)

Basin features
- Tributaries
  - left: Nyžuva, Krūtis, Šventupys, Pagalvys
  - right: Drūktupis, Akmenupis

The Dabikinė (Dabiķene in Latvian language) is a river in southwestern Latvia and northwestern Lithuania. It flows for 37.2 kilometres and has a basin area of 387.6 km^{2}. It is the right Tributary of Venta (river).

Dabikinė starts in Latvia, in the Duobelė municipality, in the vicinity of Ukrai. It flows southwest, is in Latvian territory for 5 km, then continues in Lithuania, in the Akmenė District Municipality, Šiauliai County. Downstream, there the Dabikinė hydrographic reserve has been established. Dabikinė river flows into Venta at 229 km from its mouth, on the border of the Mažeikiai District Municipality, southeast of Palnosai.

Tributaries:

- Nyžuva
- Krūtis
- Šventupys (Dabikinė)
- Pragalvys (left)
- Drūktupis
- Akmenupis (right)

The Riverbed is regulated. During summer droughts, it dries up in places. The average slope is 61 cm/km. Near Alkiškės, Dabikinė has been manually flooded to form the 124 ha pond of Sabaliauskai.

Villages and towns near Dabikinė:

- Pakalniškiai
- Alkiškiai
- Keidai
- Menčiai
- Smiltinė
- Akmenė
- Dabikinė
- Dabikinėlė
