= Akmenė Eldership =

Coordinates: 56°16′52″N 22°41′46″E

The Akmenė Eldership (Lithuanian: Akmenės seniūnija) is an eldership of Lithuania, located in the Akmenė District Municipality. In 2021 its population was 3,562.
