= Venta (city) =

- City
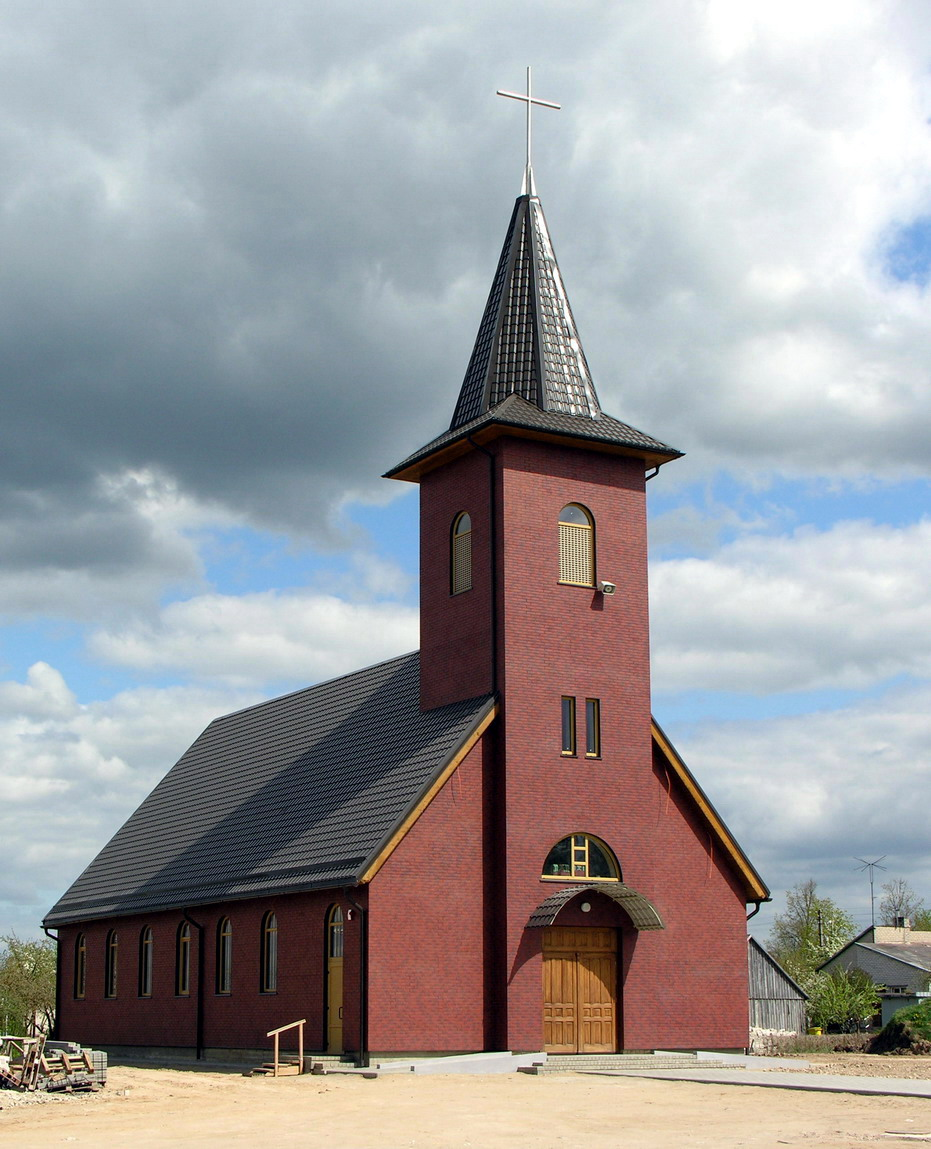

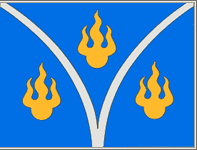
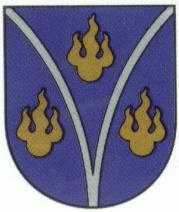
- Flag Coat of arms

- Location of Venta
- Coordinates: 56°12′N 22°42′E
- Country: Lithuania
- Ethnographic region: Samogitia
- County: Šiauliai County
- Municipality: Akmenė district municipality
- Eldership: Venta eldership
- Capital of: Venta eldership
- First mentioned: 1966
- Granted city rights: 1995

Area
  - Venta: 3.45 km^{2} (1.33 sq mi)

Population (2021)
  - Total: 2,250
  - Density: 652/km^{2} (1,690/sq mi)
- Time zone: UTC+2 (EET)
  - Summer (DST): UTC+3 (EEST)
- Postal code: LT-85019

Venta is a small city in Lithuania in the Akmenė district municipality. According to a 2021 census, there are 2,250 people living in Venta (56.4% female, 43.6% male). It is situated along the Venta River, Kuršėnai-Mažeikiai highway, and a railroad connecting Mažeikiai with Šiauliai (the train station is called Akmenė). This makes Venta better situated than Naujoji Akmenė, the capital of the district. Venta is also one kilometre (0.62 mi) from the small villages of Žerkščiai and Pašilė (Akmenė). There is a small bridge connecting Venta to Žerkščiai. There are 2 Seniūnaitijas which make up Venta; "Draugystės" and "Ventos Miesto".

== Etymology ==
The name of the city derives from the Venta River, which flows near the southern and western parts of the settlement.

== Geography ==
The city is located on the right bank of Venta (river), in a winding stretch of the river, at the mouth of Eglesys. The former Libau–Romny Railway runs along the northern edge of the city of Venta. The Venta (village) is also located near the city. Venta is part of the Venta Regional Park. Limestone is abundant in the area.

== History ==
The town grew after World War II together with a lime factory which later produced bricks. At its peak the factory employed about 1,000 people. The city was formed when Bauskas and Purviai villages were joined on 30 December 1966. After the 1990 declaration of independence from the Soviet Union, the factory faced severe financial difficulties while shifting from planned economy to free market. The factory's departments were made into separate companies. Some went bankrupt and their buildings were destroyed; others were privatized. In 1995, Venta officially became a city settlement before that though Venta was the largest so-called village in Lithuania. In 1999 a public company, "Naujasis kalcitas" (English: The New Calcite; the only manufacturer of quicklime in Lithuania, supplying 50-55% of the domestic market) purchased and reconstructed a remaining lime burning technology line with rotary kiln. The official coat of arms were also approved in 1999. The Church of the Immaculate Conception of the Blessed Virgin Mary was built in 2009. Recently a new heating facility using natural gas was built to provide heat for the city.

Administrative Territorial Subordination
1966-1978	1978-1995	1995-
Venta Area Centre	Urban Settlement	Venta Eldership

== Culture ==
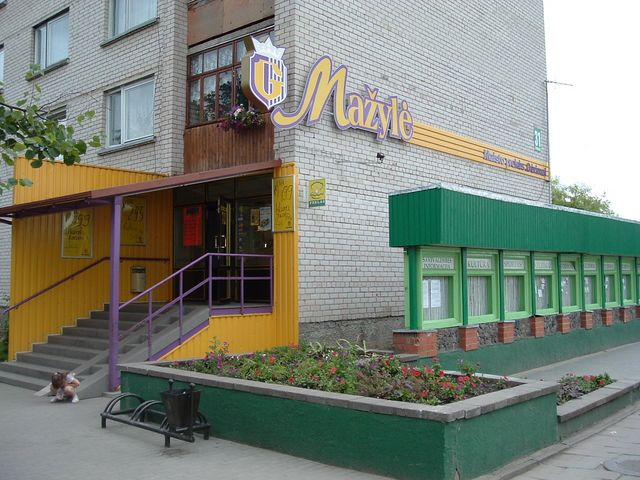
A grocery shop in Venta

The city has school (Ventos gimnazija), which was established in 1907, it started with about 20 students. Studies lasted 4 years and commenced in November when all field jobs have finished. Classes were held in Russian. In 1940, as the number of students grew to 40, the school moved to a new building and was renamed Dabikinė Elementary School. The building belonged to a railroad company and was not fitted for school, but the war prevented the reconstruction. In 1949 the number of students reached 120 and the school was reorganized into a 7-year school. The railroad building was too small and the school was forced to rent two other buildings more than one kilometre (0.62 miles) apart. In 1953-54 the school was reorganized again as a high school. In 1960 a spacious new building was opened. At that time the school had 330 students and about 20 teachers. In 1972 a new expansion was built with a gym and 14 new classrooms. The school currently employs about 50 teachers. It is known for being active in various projects and for students who do well on various national science Olympics.

In 1961 a public library was established in Venta. It started with 6,150 books and grew to 18,000 in 2000. In 1996 it won the second place in "Biblioteka - kultūros centras" (English: Library - cultural center) contest organized by the Open Society Fund Lithuania. A club, "Ventos mūzų malūnas", was established by the library and gathers people interested in art and poetry. Juozas Miltinis (1907–1994) was born in what is now Venta.

=== Music traditions ===
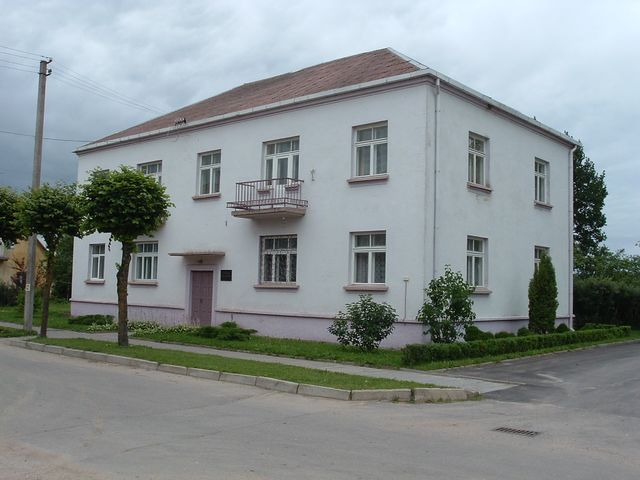
Venta music school

Venta music school has a traditional Lithuanian music assemble "Ventukai". Its members are mostly local youth ranging from 9 to 20 years old. In 2004 it became famous after appearing in a popular song contest Nacionalinė Muzikos Lyga (commonly abbreviated as NML; English: National Music League) on LNK, one of the biggest TV stations in Lithuania. Critics expected that they would be voted off in the first round, but they reached the finals and won the contest on May 29. It received the first prize of 275,000 litas. Later that year they released a CD, Keliaujam su daina (We Are Travelling With Songs), with 16 fast, upbeat songs. They have made appearances across Lithuania and in other countries including Latvia, Germany and Italy. In 2004 they made their one-thousandth concert in Venta.

== Population ==
1970	1979	1981	1985	1989	2001	2011	2015	2017	2018	2021
2,537	3,240	3,400	3,400	3,827	3,412	2,392	2,334	2,311	2,215	2,250

=== Ethnic Composition ===
2011, 2,392 people living in Venta:

•Lithuanians – 97.41% (2,330)

•Russians - 1.42% (34)

•Others - 1.17% (28)

2001, 3,412 people living in Venta:

•Lithuanians – 97.39% (3,323)

•Russians - 1.29% (34)

•Poles - 0.32% (11)

•Germans - 0.32% (11)

•Others - 1.17% (28)

== Gallery ==
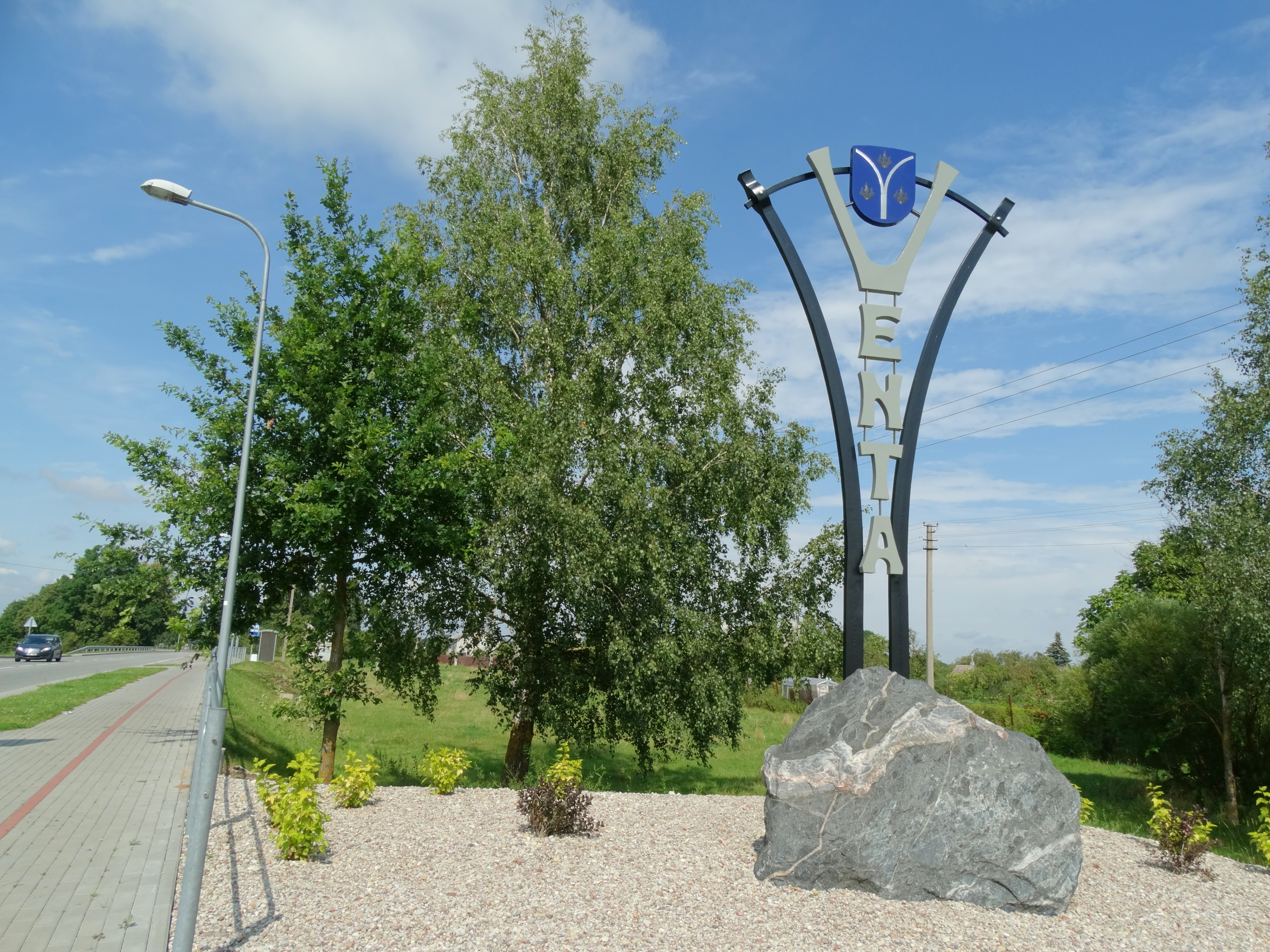
Venta sign

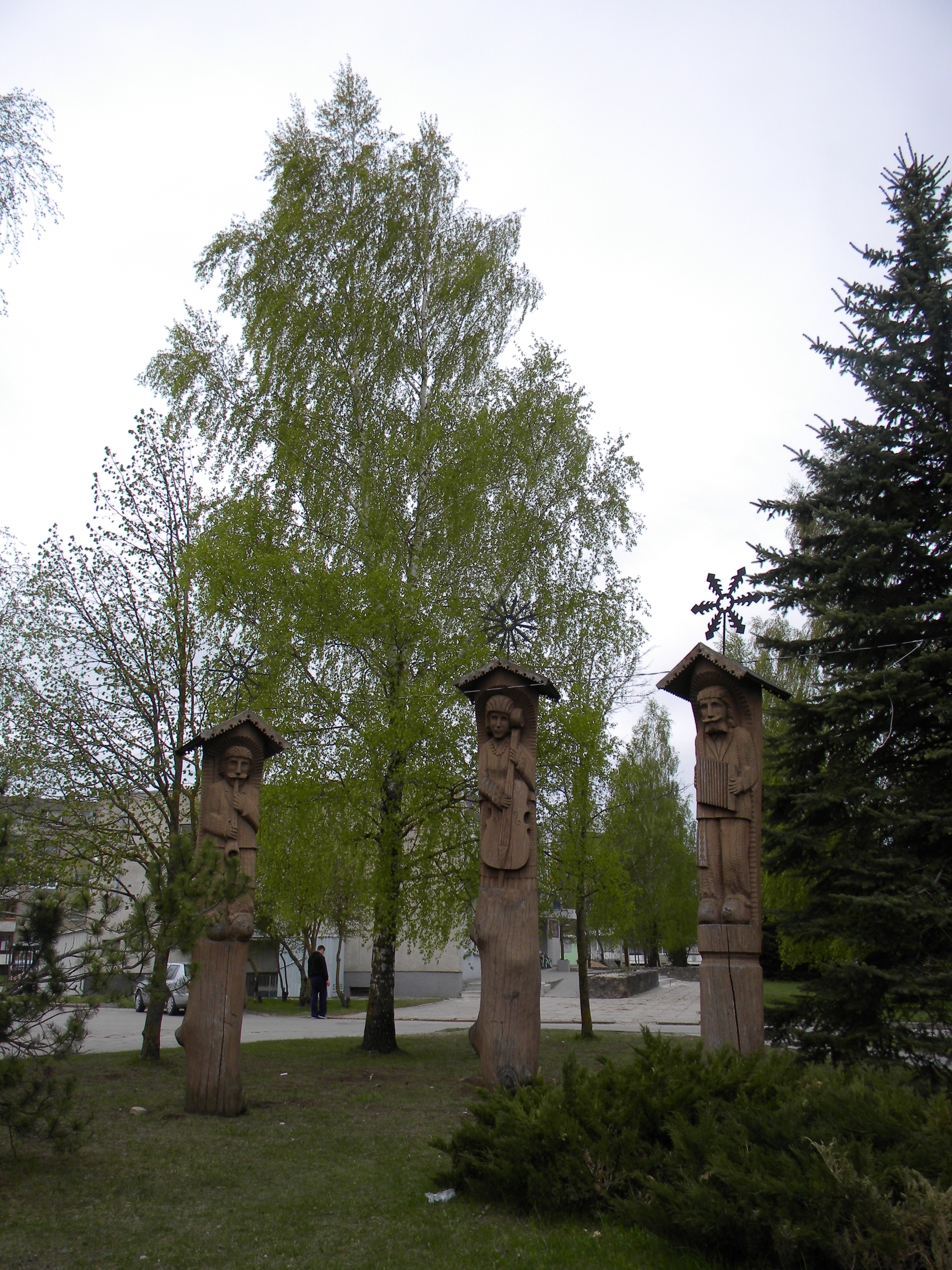
Three wooden musicians in the city's centre

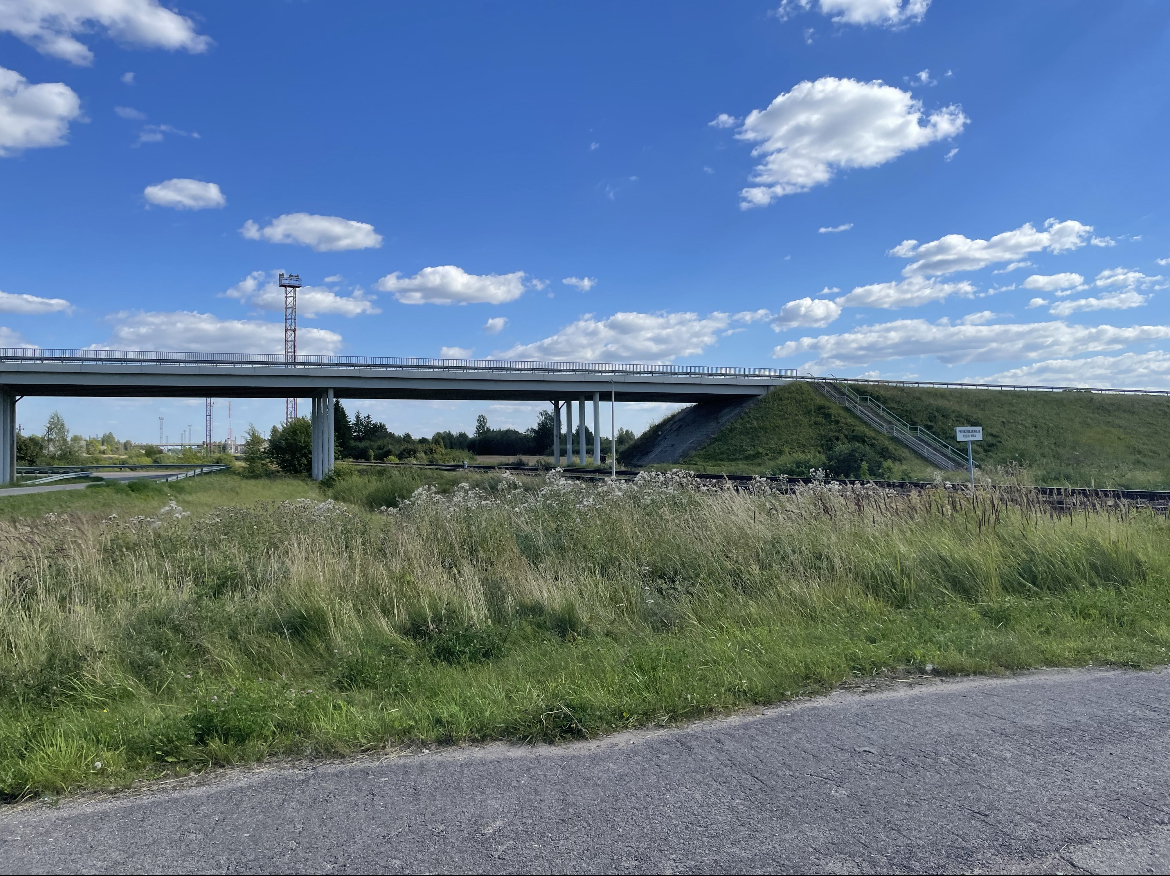
Bridge in northern Venta, leads to Akmenė
