= Vadakste =

River in Latvia and Lithuania

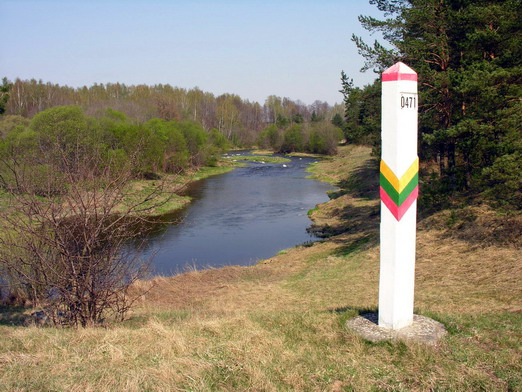
- River is on the Lithuanian-Latvian border.

- Location within Latvia
- Native name: Vadakstis (Lithuanian); Vadakste (Latvian)

Location
- Country: Latvia; Lithuania

Physical characteristics
- Source
  - coordinates: 56°29′45″N 22°55′43″E
  - elevation: 43 m (141 ft)
- Mouth
  - location: Venta River
  - coordinates: 56°24′43″N 22°13′3″E
- Length: 82.2 km (51.1 mi)
- Basin size: 1,230 km^{2} (470 sq mi)
- Discharge
  - average: 95 m^{3}/s (3,400 cu ft/s)

Basin features
- Tributaries
  - left: Mežupe, Agluona, Ašva
  - right: Līgotne, Avīkne, Benaišu strauts, Burbuļ strauts, Alkšņupe, Ezere River, Suste, Rīku strauts, Pestīle

The Vadakste (Lithuanian: Vadakstis) is a river in southern Latvia and northern Lithuania. It is a right tributary of the Venta River. The length is 82.2 km (51.1 mi), of which over 55 km (34 mi) follow the Latvia–Lithuania border. The catchment area is 1,230 km^{2} (470 sq mi). It originates near the city Auce, Latvia. It flows first in a southwest, and then in a westerly direction. It begins to flow along the border between Latvia and Lithuania from the village of Vegeriai. It flows into Venta at 184.2 km (114.5 mi) from its mouth, in the village of Griežė, 2 km (1.2 mi) northwest of Leckava.

The main tributaries: Ašva, Ezere River, Agluona and Avīkne. The average river slope is 73 cm/km.
