= Avižlys =

Coordinates: 56°12′N 22°37′E

Location
- Country: Lithuania
- Location: Akmenė district municipality, Šiauliai County

Physical characteristics
- Mouth
  - location: Venta River
- Length: 20 km (12 mi)
- Basin size: 78 km^{2} (30 sq mi)
- Discharge
  - average: 0.55 m^{3}/s (19 cu ft/s)

Basin features
- Tributaries
  - left: Miklinys
  - right: Vegerė

Avižlys is a river of Akmenė district municipality, Šiauliai County, northern Lithuania. It flows for 20 kilometres and has a basin area of 78 km^{2}.

The Avižlys flows into the Venta River.

== See also ==
- Uogys, another left-bank tributary of the Venta which runs close by and almost parallel
