= Kivyliai =

- Village
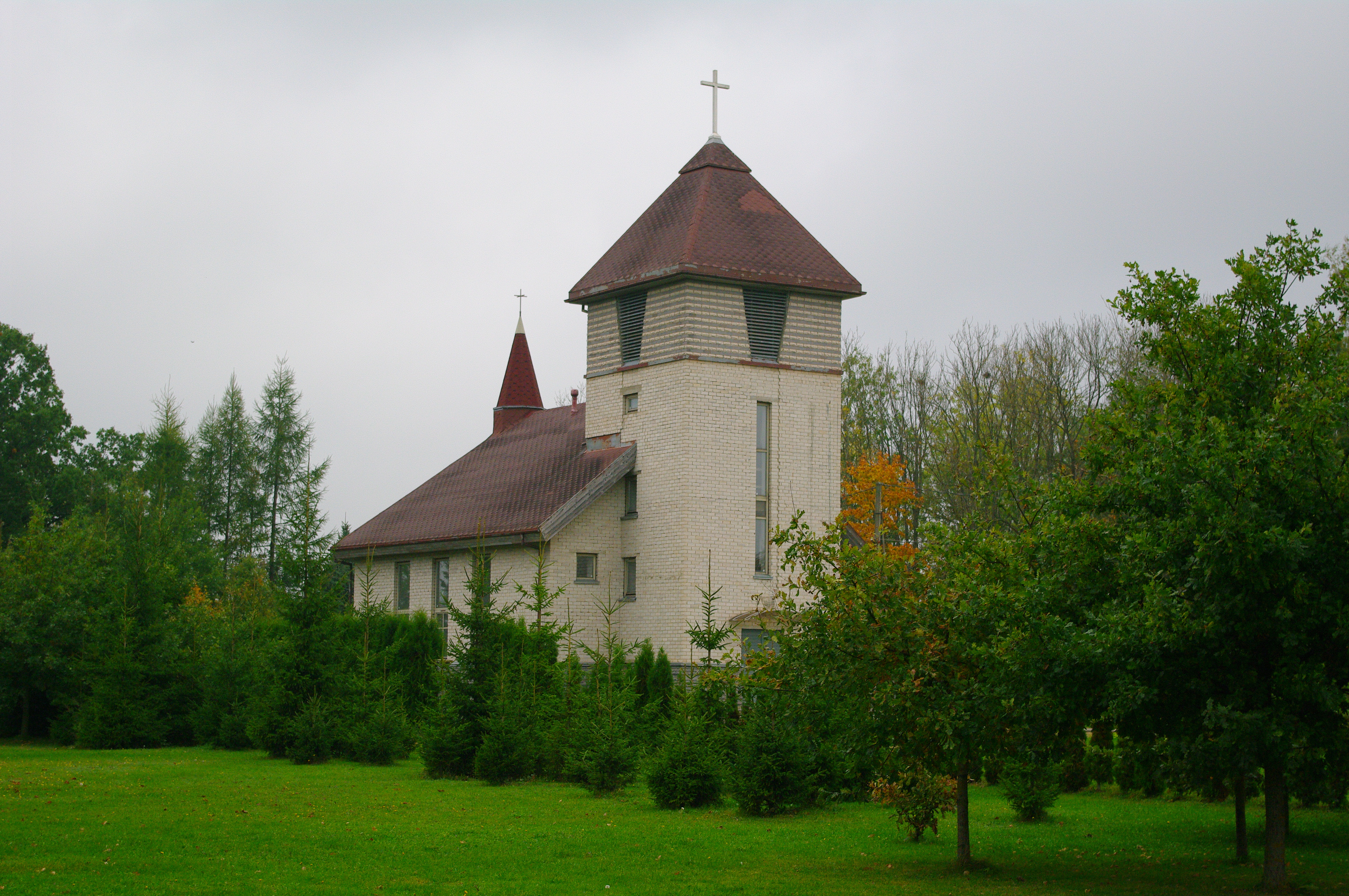

- Location within Lithuania
- Coordinates: 56°21′0″N 22°45′0″E
- Country: Lithuania
- County: Šiauliai County
- Municipality: Akmenė

Population (2021)
  - Total: 342
- Time zone: UTC+2 (EET)
  - Summer (DST): UTC+3 (EEST)

Kivyliai is a village in Akmenė district municipality, in Šiauliai County, in northwest Lithuania. According to the 2021 census, the village had a population of 342 people. The village is located near the Agluona river.

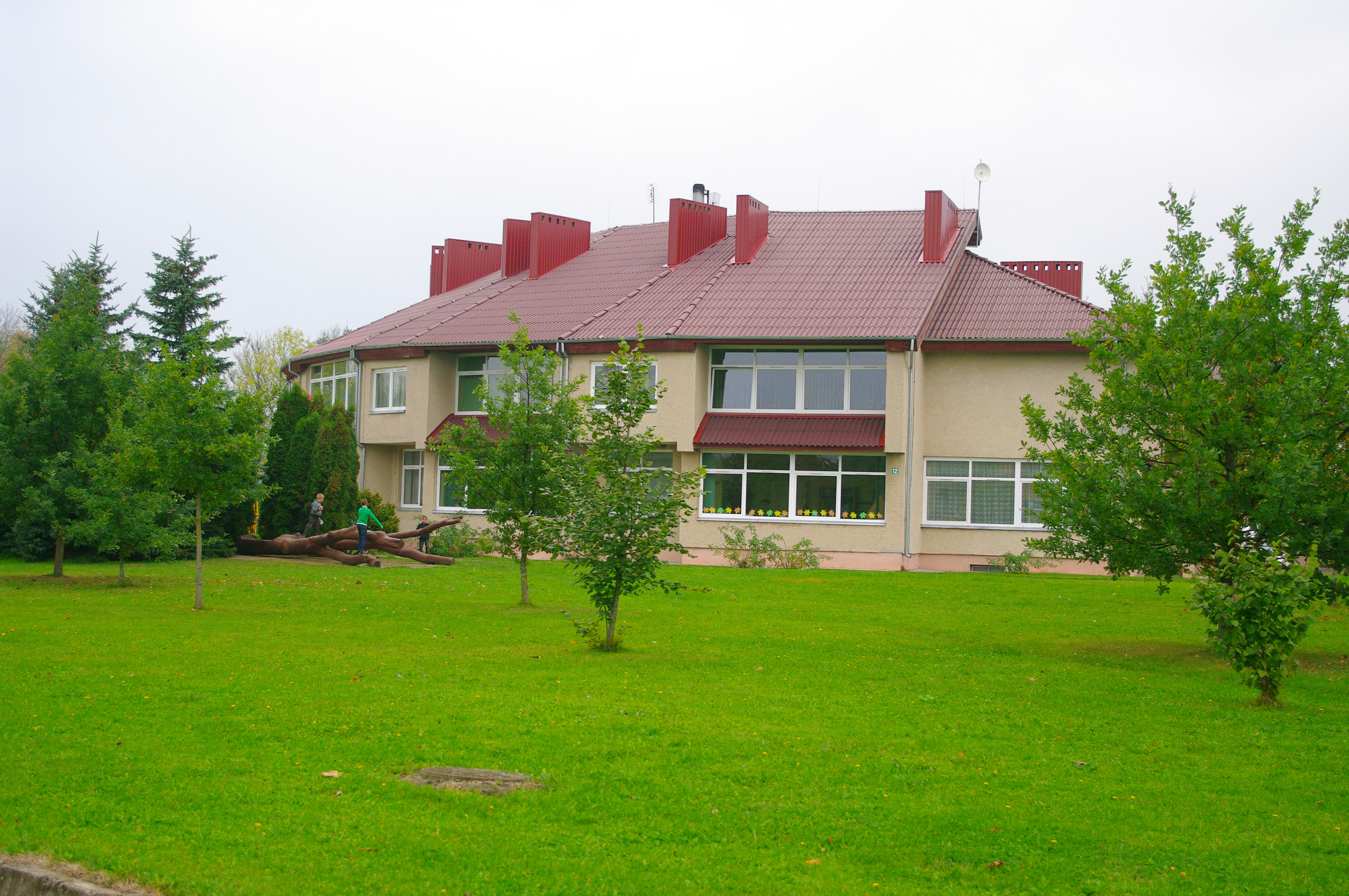
Kivyliai School

== History ==
In the 18th century the Kivyliai eldership existed, and the village consisted of 10 yards. 18th-20th centuries opening records Akmenė St. Anne's church registers testify not only to the existence of the village, but also to the presence of the manor. This fact is confirmed im 1911. In 1923 maps documenting the plans for the specifications of the manor's lands, as well as the remains of the manor's foundations. It is said that the manor could have been managed by J. Pilsudskis' grandfather or great-grandfather, but there is no data to confirm this.
