= Baubliai (Akmenė District) =

- Village
- Location of Baubliai (Akmenė District)
- Coordinates: 56°07′N 22°55′E
- Country: Lithuania
- Ethnographic region: Samogitia
- County: Šiauliai County
- Municipality: Akmenė district municipality
- Eldership: Papilė eldership

Population (2011)
  - Total: 24
- Time zone: UTC+2 (EET)
  - Summer (DST): UTC+3 (EEST)

Baubliai is a village in Lithuania, specifically in the Akmenė district municipality. It is 9 km (5.6 mi) away from Papilė and is also close to Klaišiai forest, which is the source of the Eglesys.

== Population ==
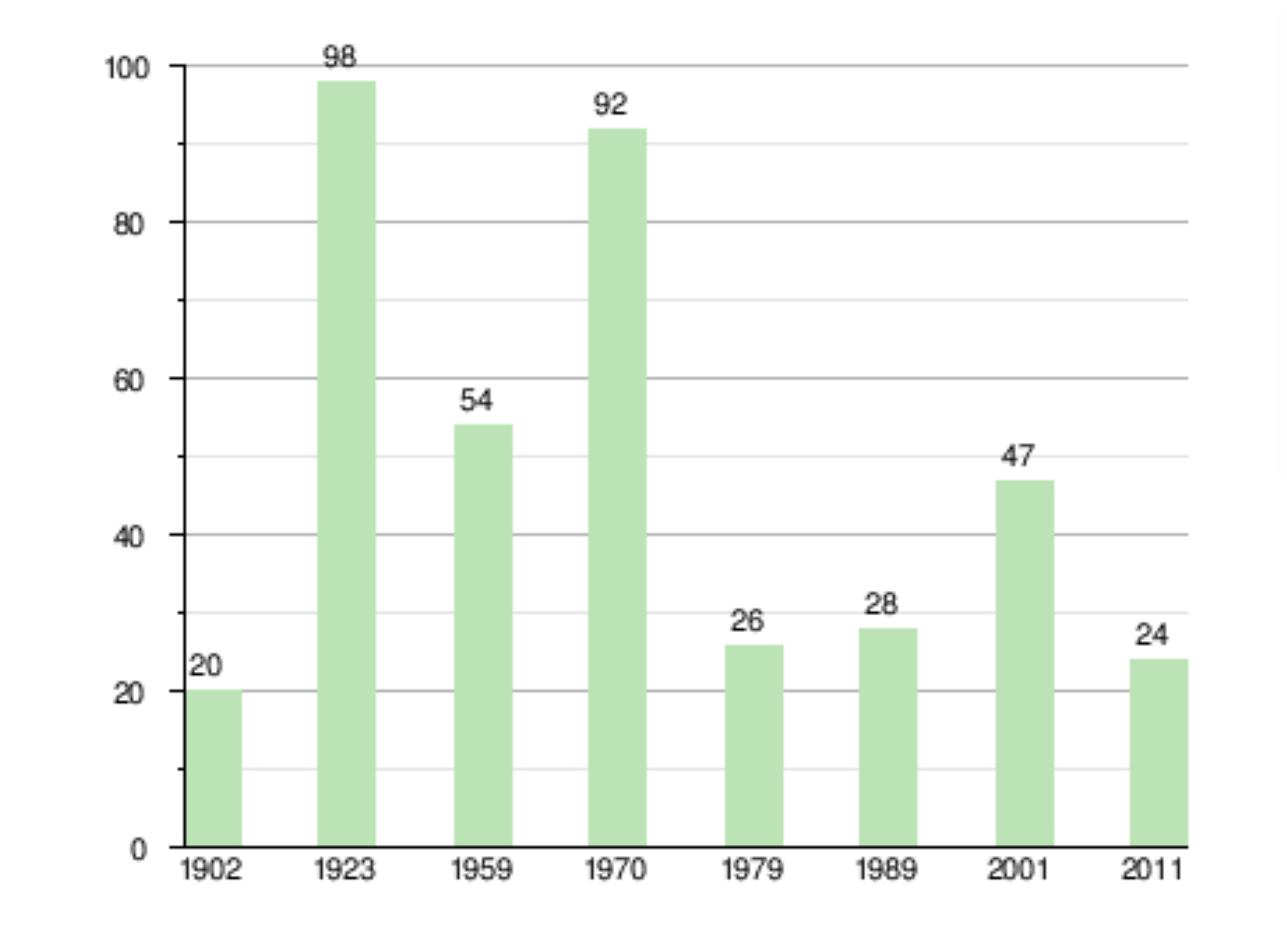
A population graph of Baubliai Village

Baubliai's population has varied drastically throughout the past century, having its peak in 1923 with 98 people and its lowest point being in 1902 with 20 people.

1902	1923	1959	1970	1979	1989	2001	2011
20	98	54	92	26	28	47	24
