= Akmenės cementas =

Akmenės cementas AB
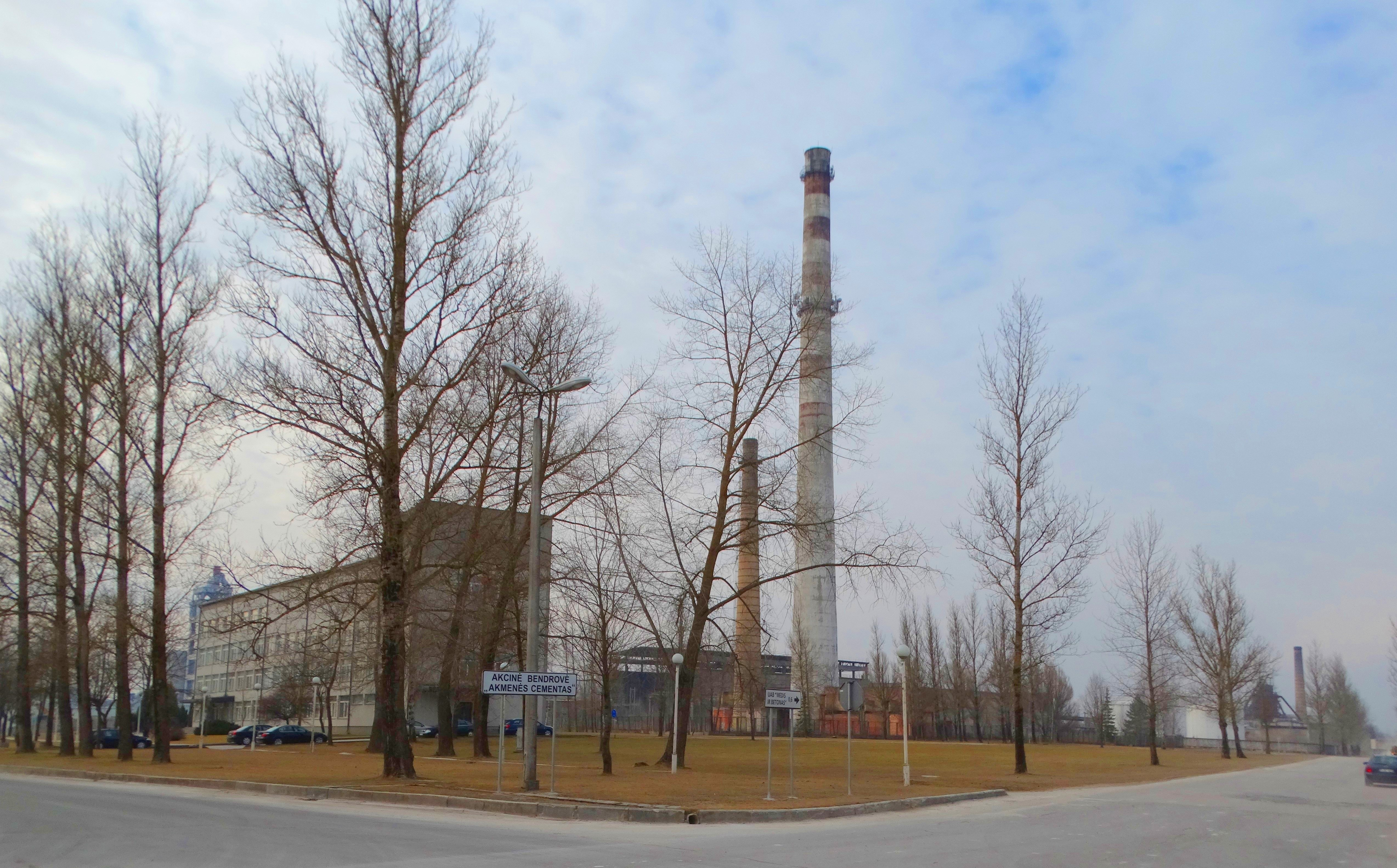
- Type: Private company
- Industry: Manufacturing
- Founded: 1947; 79 years ago
- Headquarters: J. Dalinkevičiaus g. 2, LT-85118 Naujoji Akmenė, Lithuania
- Key people: Artūras Zaremba, CEO (since 2002)
- Products: Cement
- Revenue: €133.6 million (2022)
- Net income: €15.37 million (2022)
- Total assets: €149.8 million (2022)
- Owner: Schwenk Zement Beteilgungen
- Number of employees: 462 (2024)
- Website: www.cementas.lt/en

Akmenės cementas is the only Lithuanian cement manufacturing company. It produces over one million tons of cement annually.

During the Soviet era, the enterprise produced 4.3 mln tonnes of cement annually and held the position among the top three producers in the entirety of the Soviet Union.

From 2006 to 2014, the company endeavored on its most extensive renovation to date, installing a news singular cement clinker burning facility to replace the two units that had been in operation for over four decades since the Soviet times. The updated technology now yields dry cement as opposed to wet. The newly erected chimney is measured at a towering height of 125 metres, ranking as one of the tallest structures in Lithuania.

In 2021 the majority of the company was acquired by the holding company of Schwenk Zement, who will become the sole shareholder in mid-2024.

== See also ==
- List of tallest chimneys
