= Alkiškiai =

- Village
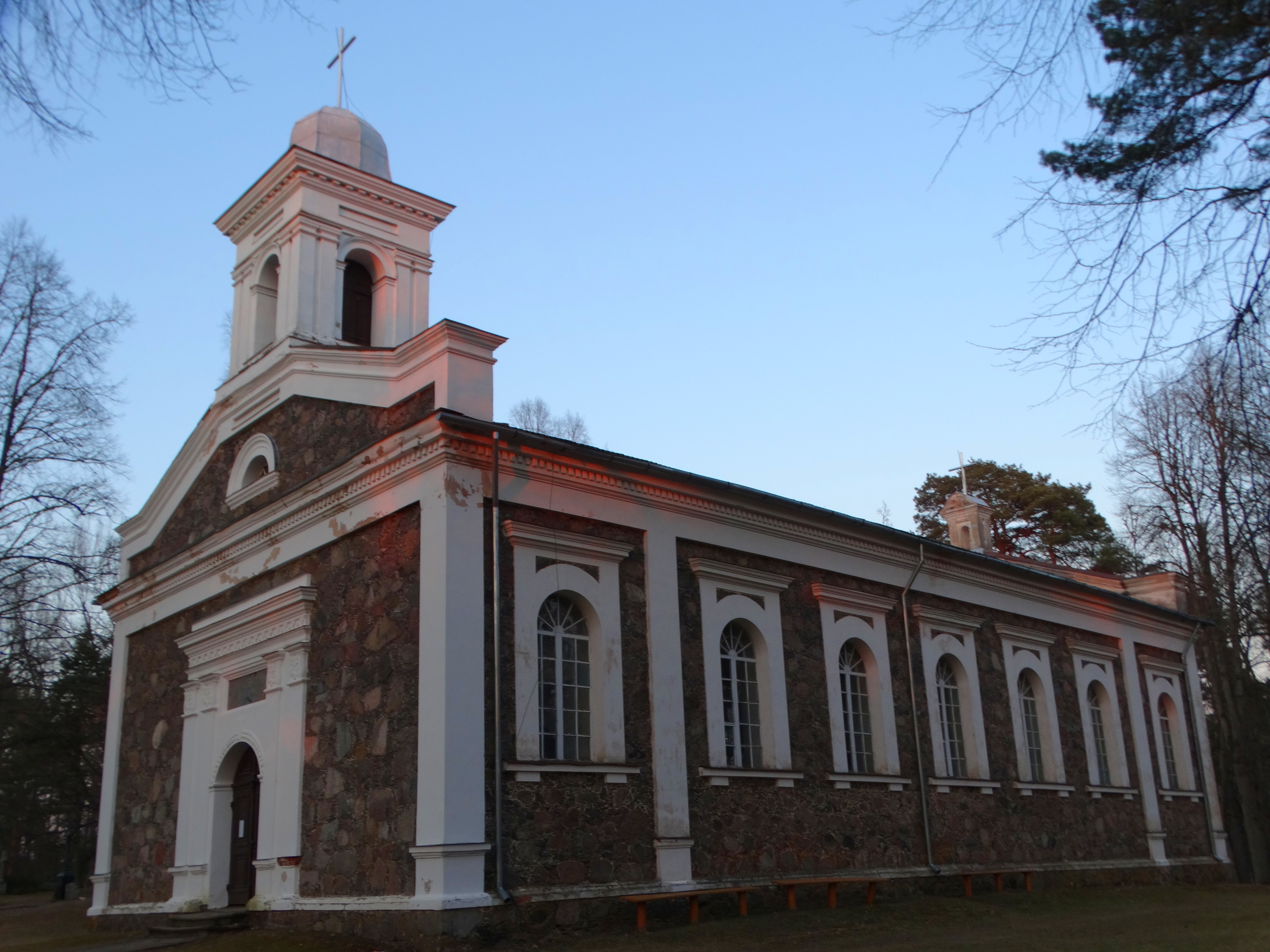
- Alkiškiai Evangelical Lutheran Church

- Location within Lithuania
- Coordinates: 56°16′0″N 22°50′20″E
- Country: Lithuania
- County: Šiauliai County
- Municipality: Akmenė

Population (2021)
  - Total: 269
- Time zone: UTC+2 (EET)
  - Summer (DST): UTC+3 (EEST)

Alkiškiai is a village in Akmenė district municipality, in Šiauliai County, in northwest Lithuania. The village is located near the Dabikinė River.

== Geography and location ==
Alkiškiai lies in the territory of the Akmenė district municipality, in Šiauliai County, 6 kilometres northeast of Akmenė. The Dabikinė River flows through the village.

== Demographics ==
According to the 2011 Lithuanian census, Alkiškiai had a population of 374 people. A decade later, the 2021 Lithuanian census, showed a population of 269 residents, reflecting a 3.3% average annual decrease. The village covers an area of 11.44 km^{2}, resulting in a population density of approximately 23.52 people per square kilometer. The population is relatively balanced by gender, with men making up 52.4% (141 individuals) and women accounting for 47.6% (141 individuals).

== Famous villagers ==
Jānis Buivids was a distinguished Latvian army general, was born in 1864 in Alkiškiai, then part of the Kovno Governorate. He began his military career in 1885 and later graduated with honors from the prestigious Nicholas General Staff Academy. During World War I, Buivids held several key command positions and was promoted to the rank of major general in 1917. After the Russian Revolution, he served briefly with Ukrainian and White Russian forces before returning to Latvia, where he played a significant role in shaping the country's military education system. Though his career spanned many countries and conflicts, his roots remained in Alkiškiai, linking the village to a notable figure in Baltic military history.
