= Uogys =

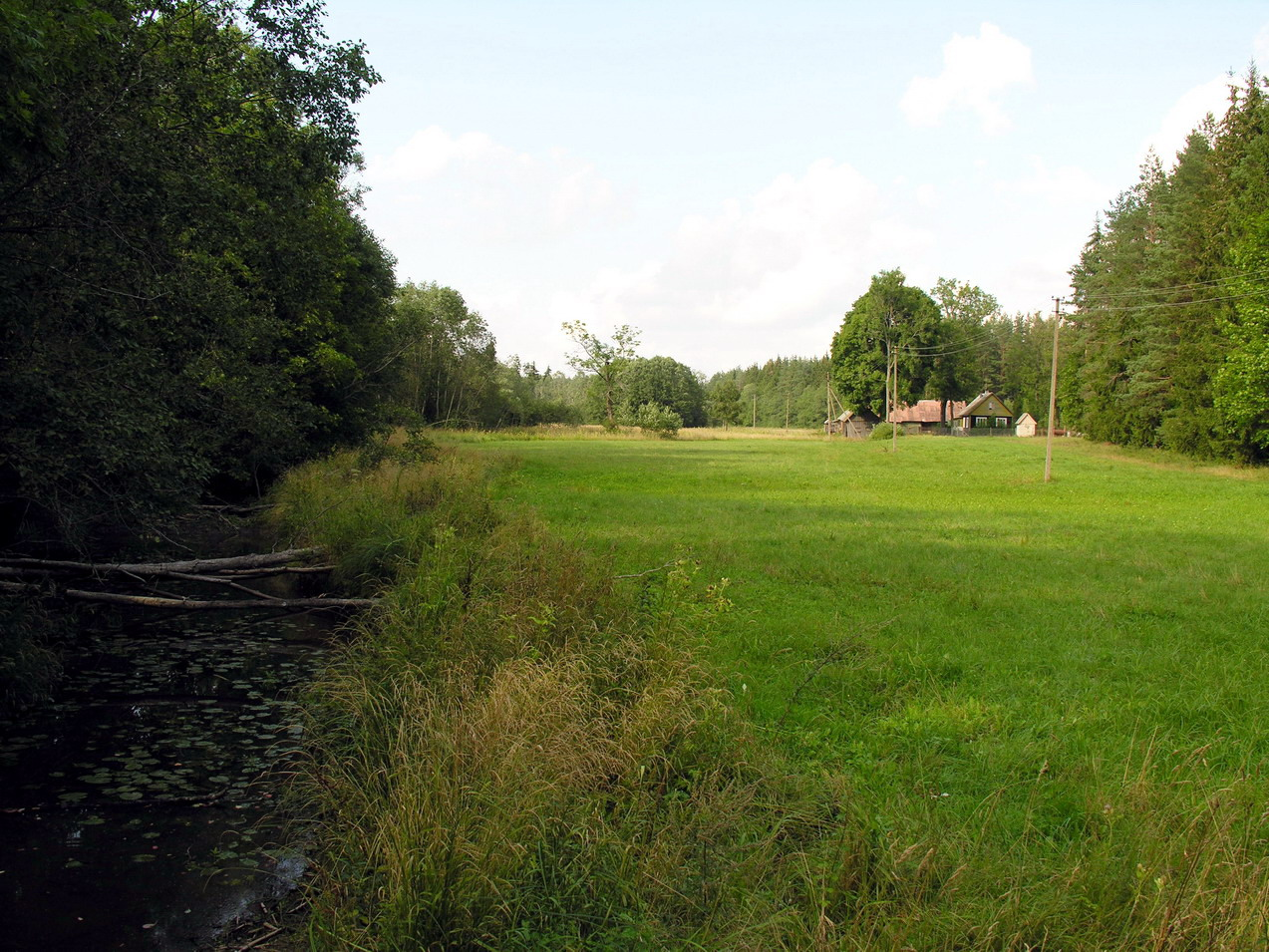
- Uogys at Ramoniškės village

Location
- Country: Lithuania

Physical characteristics
- Source
  - location: Telšiai district municipality, Telšiai County
- Mouth
  - location: Venta River
  - coordinates: 56.20006°N 22.64201°E
- Length: 30 km (19 mi)
- Basin size: 85 km^{2} (33 sq mi)

Basin features
- Progression: Venta→Baltic Sea
- Tributaries
  - left: Geištys

Uogys is a river of Telšiai County and Šiauliai County, northern Lithuania. It flows for 30 kilometres and has a basin area of 85 km^{2}.

It is a left-bank tributary of the Venta River.

== See also ==
- Avižlys, another left-bank tributary of the Venta which runs close by and almost parallel
