= Jānis Buivids =

Latvian general

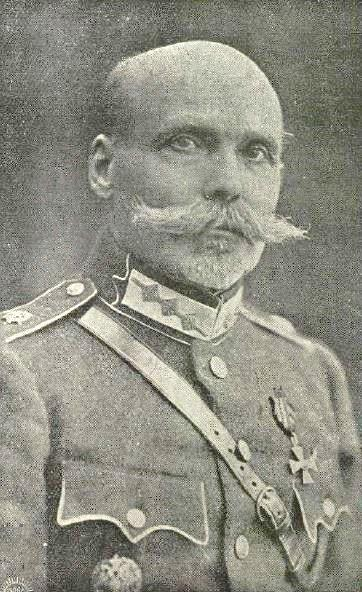
- Born: 8 September 1864; Alkiškiai, Shavelsky Uyezd, Kovno Governorate, Russian Empire
- Died: 2 April 1937 (aged 72); Jūrmala, Latvia
- Burial place: Forest Cemetery, Riga
- Military career
- Allegiance: Russian Empire (1885–1918); Ukraine (1918–1923); Latvia (1923–1928)
- Branch: Army
- Service years: 1885–1928
- Rank: General (1917, Russia)
- Commands: 13th Reserve Battalion (Russia); 17th Infantry Regiment (Russia); Brigade, 15th Siberian Division (Russia); Commander, 15th Riflemen Division (Russia); Chief of staff (Latvia)
- Wars: World War I Russian Civil War
- Awards: Cross of St. George (IV class)
- Other work: Author

Jānis Buivids (Janis Buivydas) (8 September 1864 – 2 April 1937) was a general in the Latvian Army. He participated in World War I and the Russian Civil War.

== Biography ==
Buivids was born in Alkiškiai, in the Kovno Governorate of the Russian Empire (present-day Lithuania). In 1885, he joined the Russian Imperial Army. From 1887 to 1889, he studied at the Vilnius Military Academy. Afterwards, Buivids served in the 2nd Kaunas Fortress Battalion. From 1896 to 1900, he studied at the Nicholas General Staff Academy, graduating with distinctions. From 1900, he lectured at the Kiev Military Academy. From 1907 to 1914, he served in the 166th Infantry Regiment. In 1910, he was promoted to the rank of colonel.

In 1914, he was promoted commander of the 13th Reserve Battalion, but in December he became the commander of the 17th Infantry Regiment. For merit on the battlefield, he received the Cross of St. George (IV class) and Sword of St. George. From 1916, he commanded a brigade in the 15th Siberian Division. In 1917, he was promoted to the rank of general; later that year, he was appointed to the post of commander of the 15th Riflemen Division.

After the October Revolution, he was arrested, but was released after a month. In October 1918 he joined the army of the Hetman of Ukraine, Pavlo Skoropadskyi, and fought in Denikin's army. After the Russian Civil War, he returned to Latvia.

From 1923, Buivids lectured in senior officer courses. On 29 February 1924, Buivids was promoted to Chief of staff of the Latvian Army by Minister of War Fricis Birkenšteins, a promotion that was confirmed 26 March 1924 by Latvian President Jānis Čakste. From 1925 to 1928, he led academic officer courses. In 1928, he attained maximum age for military service and was retired. He is the author of several books and military publications.

Buivids died in Jūrmala, and was buried in Riga, at the Forest Cemetery.

== See also ==
- List of Latvian Army generals
