= Naujoji Akmenė Rural Eldership =

Eldership of Lithuania

The Naujoji Akmene Rural Eldership (Lithuanian: Naujosios Akmenės kaimiškoji seniūnija) is an eldership of Lithuania, located in the Akmenė District Municipality. In 2021 its population was 1803.
