= La Venta (disambiguation) =

La Venta is an archaeological site of Mexico.

La Venta may also refer to:

- La Venta (Colombia), a fossil locality in Colombia
- La Venta, Francisco Morazán, a municipality in Honduras
- La Venta, Asturias, a parish in Spain
- La Venta River (Mexico)
- La Venta River (Puerto Rico)

== See also ==
- La venda
- Venta (disambiguation)
