= Šventupys (Dabikinė) =

Coordinates: 56°15′25″N 22°53′19″E

Location
- Country: Lithuania
- Region: Akmenė district municipality, Šiauliai County

Physical characteristics
- Mouth
  - location: Dabikinė River
- Length: 23.7 km (14.7 mi)
- Basin size: 127.9 km^{2} (49.4 sq mi)
- Discharge
  - average: 0.69 m^{3}/s (24 cu ft/s)

Basin features
- Tributaries
  - left: Duobelupis, Genupys
  - right: Gervė, Debrėstis

Šventupys is a river of Akmenė district municipality, Šiauliai County, northern Lithuania. It flows for 23.7 kilometres (14.7 mi) and has a basin area of 127.9 km^{2} (49.4 sq mi).
