= Klaišiai =

- Village
- Location of Klaišiai
- Coordinates: 56°08′N 22°56′E
- Country: Lithuania
- Ethnographic region: Samogitia
- County: Šiauliai County
- Municipality: Akmenė district municipality
- Eldership: Papilė eldership

Population (2021)
  - Total: 95
- Time zone: UTC+2 (EET)
  - Summer (DST): UTC+3 (EEST)

Klaišiai is a village in the south of Akmenė district, 6 km (3.7 mi) from Šemetaičiai.

There is a primary school and a medical center. The preserved Klaišiai manor can be found here too, which was originally owned by the Burbos family.

== Population ==
1902	1923	1959	1970	1979	1985	1989	2001	2011	2021
46	43	109	140	240	205	181	179	120	95
