= Kruopiai =

- Town
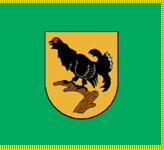
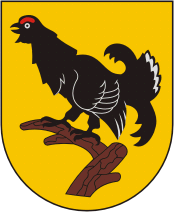
- Flag Coat of arms

- Location in Lithuania
- Coordinates: 56°14′30″N 23°01′10″E
- Country: Lithuania
- Ethnographic region: Samogitia
- County: Šiauliai County

Population (2011)
  - Total: 508
- Time zone: UTC+2 (EET)
  - Summer (DST): UTC+3 (EEST)

Kruopiai (Polish: Krupie) is a small town in Šiauliai County in northern-central Lithuania. As of 2011 it had a population of 508. It is the final resting place of Ann Wigmore, where a monument was unveiled in her honour on 22 September 2012.
