= Naujoji Akmenė =

- Town
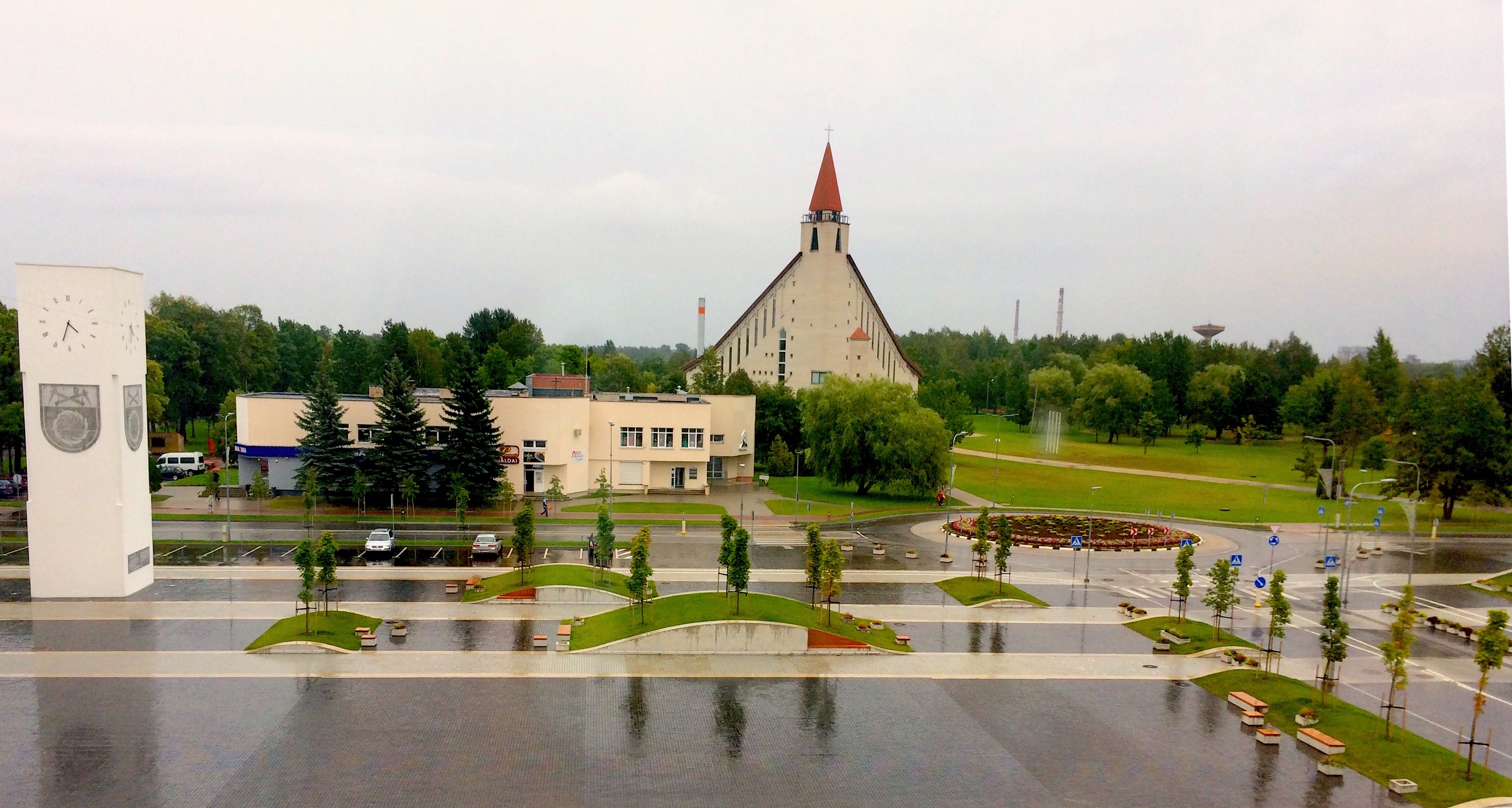

- Flag Coat of arms

- Location of Naujoji Akmenė
- Coordinates: 56°19′N 22°54′E
- Country: Lithuania
- Ethnographic region: Samogitia
- County: Šiauliai County
- Municipality: Akmenė district municipality
- Eldership: Naujoji Akmenė town eldership
- Capital of: Akmenė district municipality Naujoji Akmenė town eldership Naujoji Akmenė rural eldership
- First mentioned: 1949
- Granted city rights: 1965

Area
  - Total: 9.20 km^{2} (3.55 sq mi)

Population (2025)
  - Total: 8,005
  - Density: 870/km^{2} (2,250/sq mi)
- Time zone: UTC+2 (EET)
  - Summer (DST): UTC+3 (EEST)
- Postal code: LT-85001

Naujoji Akmenė (Samogitian: Naujuojė Akmenė) is a town in north-western Lithuania, in the Šiauliai County, near the Latvian border, in the Samogitia region.

There is a church (consecrated in 1999), a library, a hospital, the cultural centre (built in 1958), a post office (postal code LT-85001).

It was established as a new town in 1952 and is one of the newest cities in Lithuania. Its name means New Akmenė. It is an industrial base with concrete as its main product, with Public company Akmenės Cementas (English: Akmenė Concrete) producing 700,000 tonnes of concrete annually. As a new city, it did initially have well-developed infrastructure. For example, a special branch of the railway had to be built for the factory needs. The road network was rapidly developing before the city even existed.

== Geography ==
Most important roads are 154 Šiauliai-Gruzdžiai-Naujoji Akmenė and 156 Naujoji Akmenė-Venta. There is a Karpėnai railway station (used only for cargo trains).

== History ==
According to historians and archaeologists, the area around the town was inhabited by the Semigallian tribes. In 1652, the village of Karpėnai, which belonged to the Akmenė Manor, was mentioned at the current location of the town.

On July 27, 1945, the government of the Lithuanian SSR passed a resolution to build a cement factory in the village of Karpėnai, as there were limestone deposits suitable for cement production. In 1947, preparations for the construction of the factory began: the first residential house was built in Karpėnai, a 30-hectare site was designated 1.3 km from the factory for the construction of a settlement, and the first builders, including prisoners brought in for the construction, were housed in hastily built wooden barracks or simply in tents. In 1949, State Construction Trust No. 3 built the first residential houses on what is now Taikos Street. In 1952, construction moved to what is now Nepriklausomybės Street, and in the same year, the first cement kilns began operating. On September 21, 1952, the first cement production technological line was launched.

On January 31, 1952, by decree of the Presidium of the Supreme Soviet of the Lithuanian SSR, the village of Karpėnai was renamed "Naujoji Akmenė" (New Akmenė) and designated as an urban-type settlement. In 1962, the administrative center of the Akmenė District was moved to Naujoji Akmenė, and on August 25, 1965, it was granted city rights.

During the Soviet era, the main industrial enterprise in the city was the "Akmencementas" Cement and Asbestos Production Association, which was awarded the Order of the Red Banner of Labor and named in honor of the 50th anniversary of the USSR. At its peak, the factory could produce enough cement in just four hours to build a 100 apartment residential building. The city grew around the factory, with the construction of cultural centers, the Kosmonautų (Cosmonauts) and Tarybų residential districts, a healthcare complex (including a hospital, polyclinic, sanatorium, and sports palace), as well as factories for building materials, branches of the Klaipėda reinforced concrete structures plant, and the Telšiai "Mastis" knitwear factory. A swimming pool and a widescreen cinema were also built. In 1979, the Naujoji Akmenė city stadium and sports center were opened.

On April 17, 1998, the coat of arms of Naujoji Akmenė was officially approved.

Administrative-territorial subordination
1952-1953	urban-type settlement	Akmenė District	Šiauliai region
1953-1962	urban-type settlement	Akmenė District	
1962	urban-type settlement	Akmenė District centre	
1962-1965	urban-type settlement	Mažeikiai District	
1965-1977	city of regional subordination	Akmenė District centre	
1977-1995	city of regional subordination, Naujoji Akmenė neighborhood	Akmenė District centre	
1995-	Naujoji Akmenė Town Eldership, Naujoji Akmenė Rural Eldership centre	Akmenė District Municipality centre	Šiauliai County

== Gallery ==
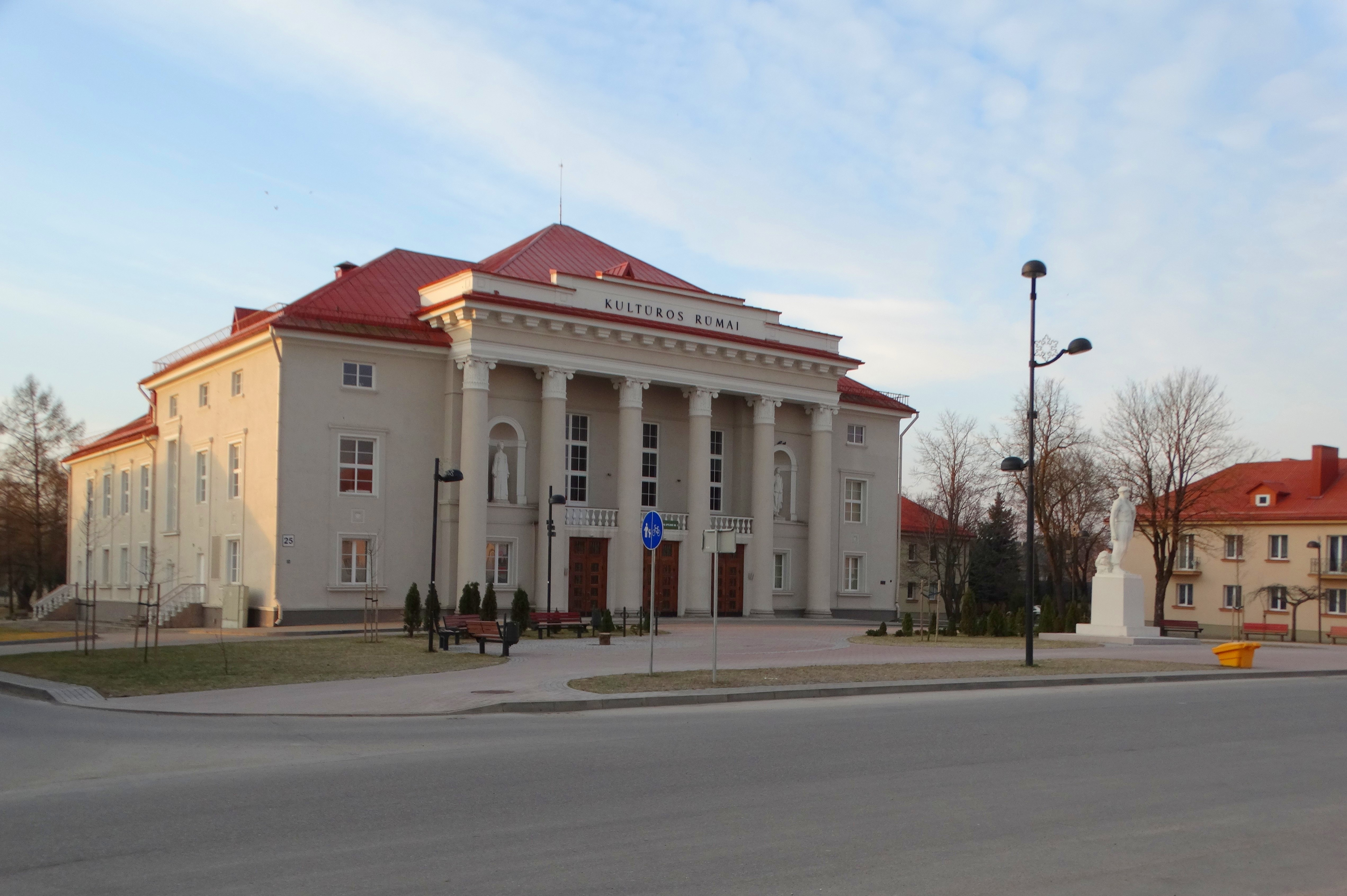
Cultural centre of the town

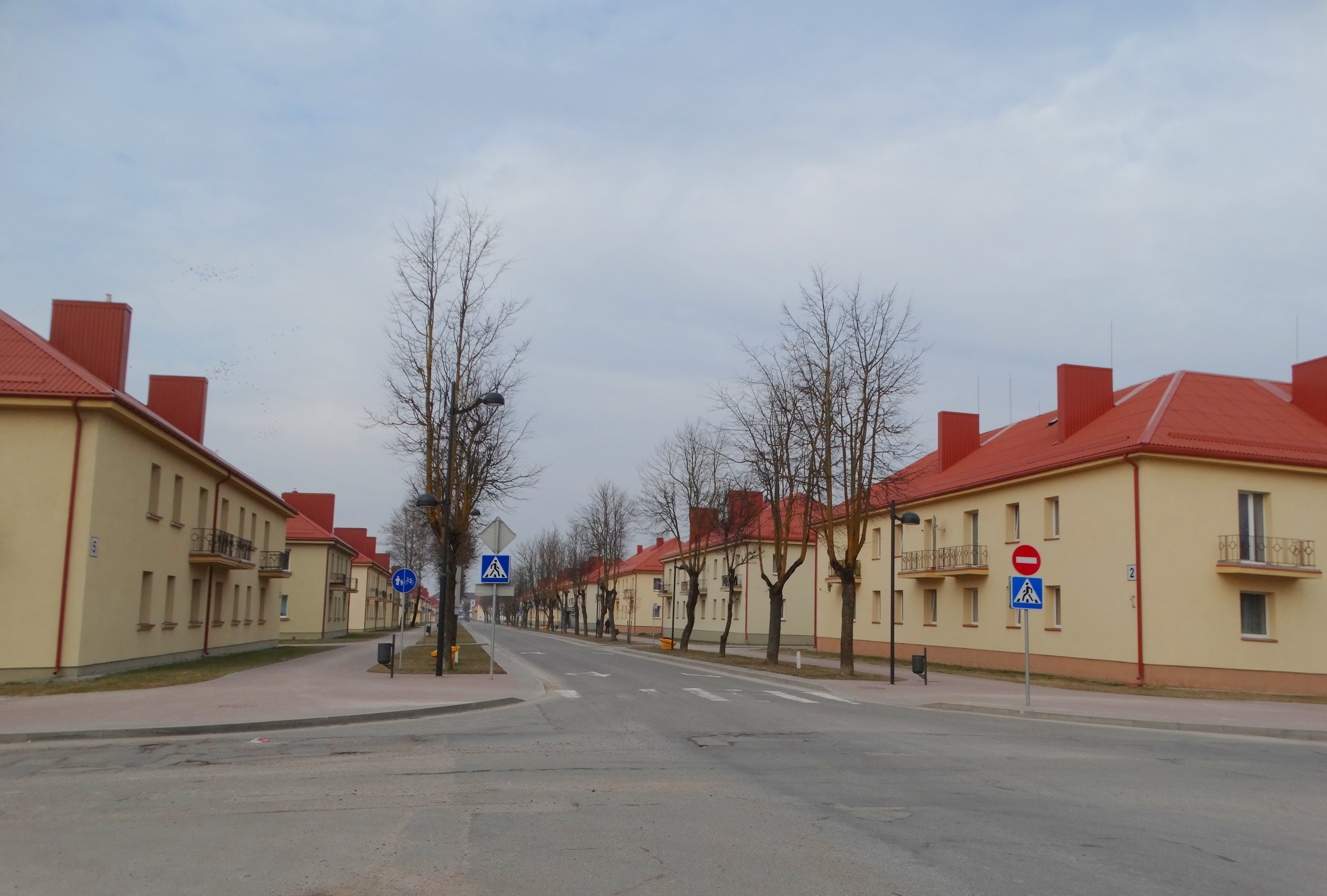
Avenue in the town centre

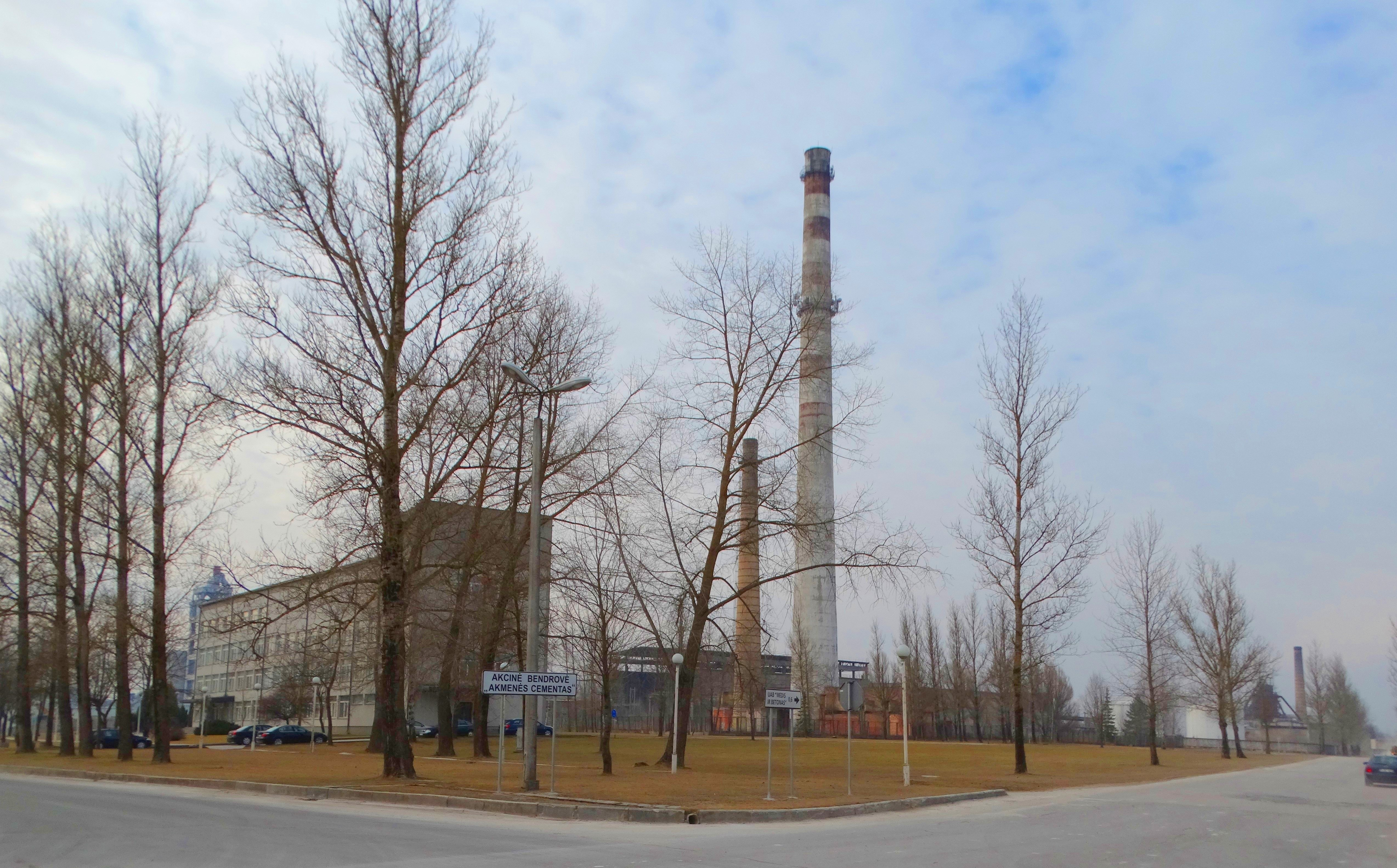
Akmenės Cementas factory
