= Akmenė =

- Town
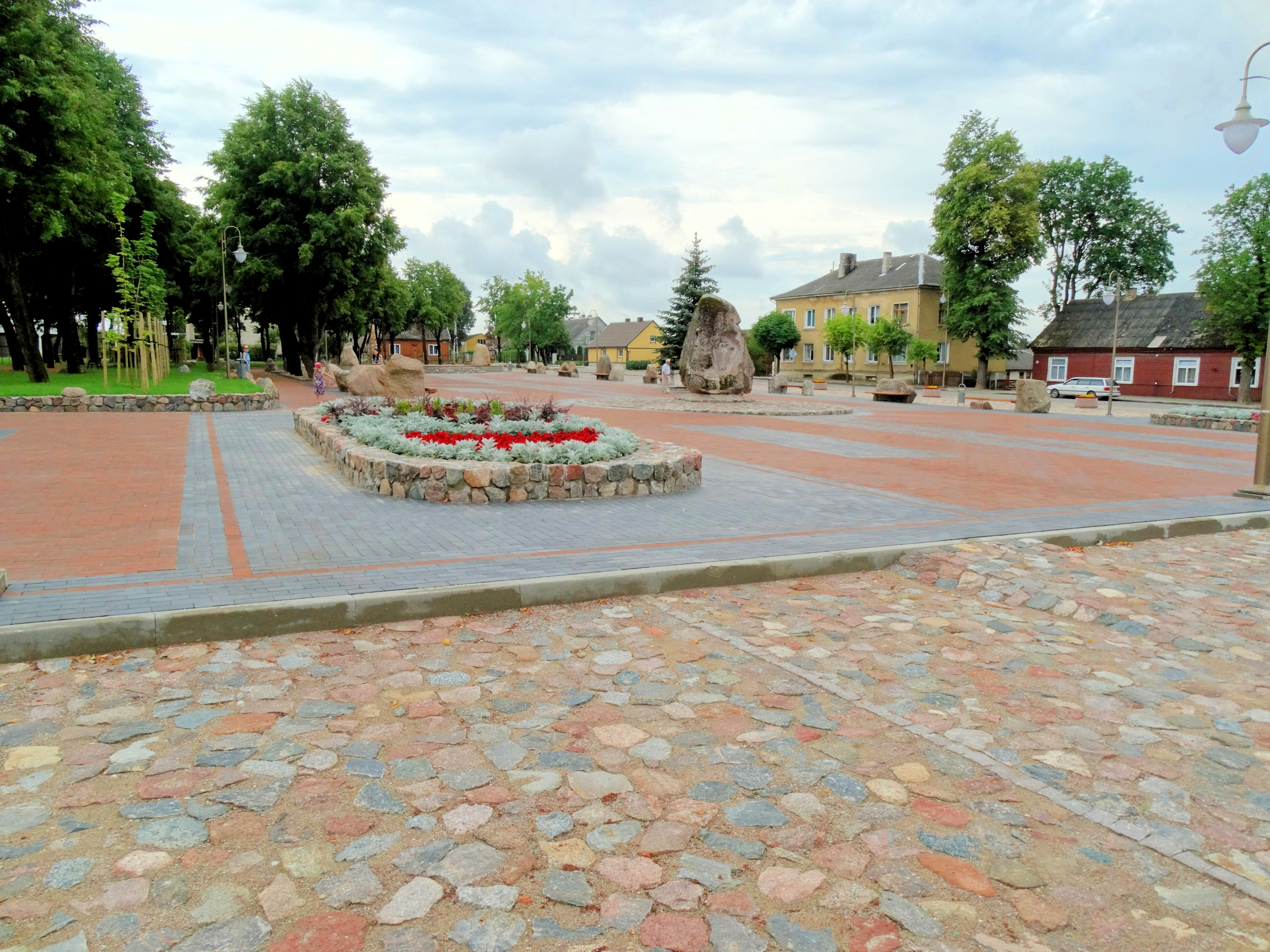
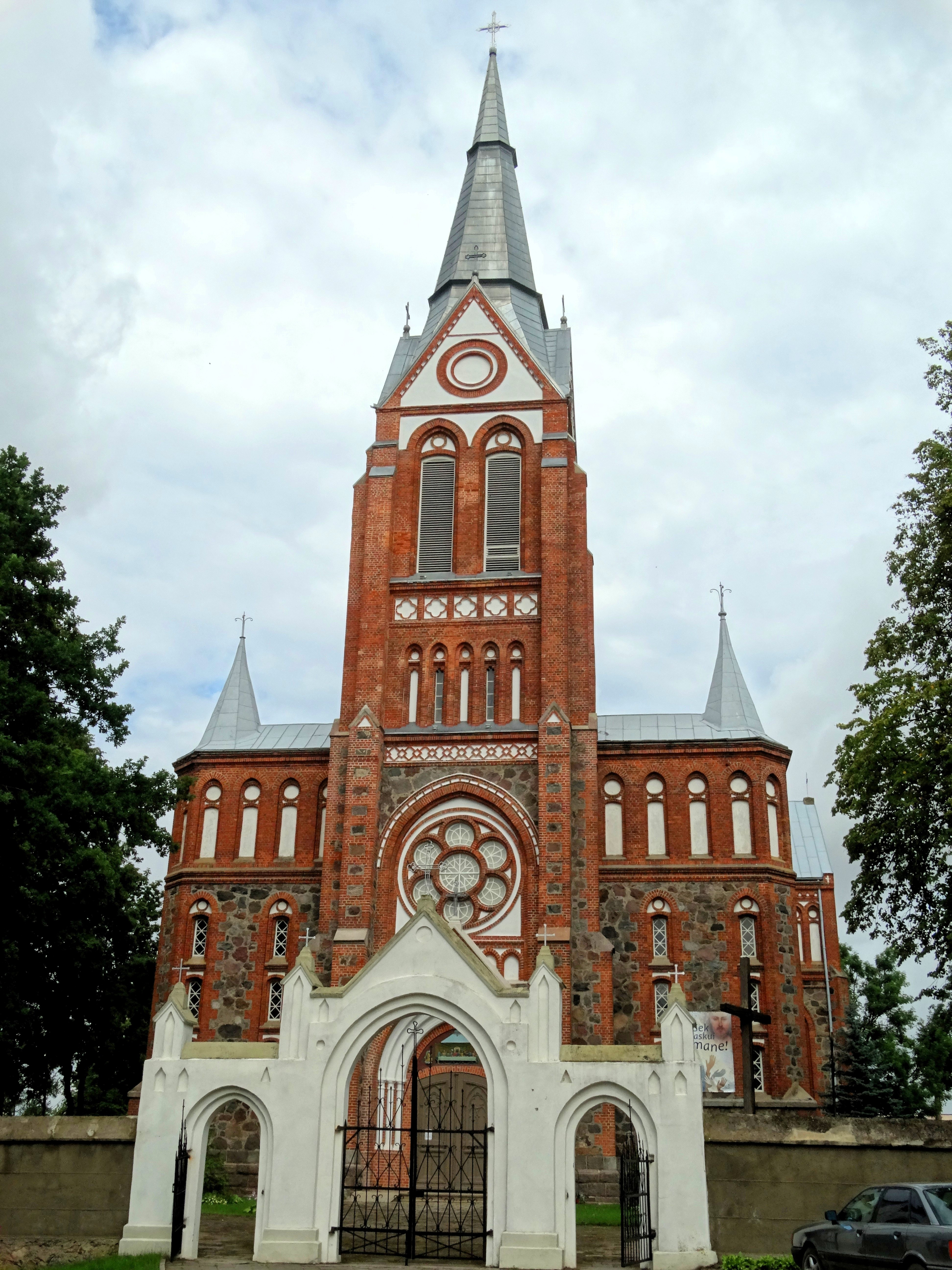
- Town Square Akmenė Regional Museum Church of St. Anne Culture House Akmenė Free Economic Zone

- Flag Coat of arms

- Location of Akmenė
- Coordinates: 56°19′N 22°54′E
- Country: Lithuania
- Ethnographic region: Samogitia
- County: Šiauliai County
- Municipality: Akmenė district municipality
- Eldership: Akmenė eldership
- Capital of: Akmenė eldership
- First mentioned: 1511
- Granted town rights: 1592

Population (2021)
  - Total: 2,345
- Time zone: UTC+2 (EET)
  - Summer (DST): UTC+3 (EEST)

Akmenė (pronounced [ɐkˈmɛːneː]) is a city in northern Lithuania.

Following the discovery of large reserves of limestone and clay in the region, in 1947 construction work began on one of the largest cement production complexes in the Baltic States. Nearby, a new town grew up which was to become the region's administrative centre: Naujoji Akmenė ("New Akmenė").

== Name ==
Most probably the name is derived from a rivulet that flows north of the town: the Akmenupis (approximate meaning – "river with a lot of stones"). Foreign renderings include: German: Akmene, Yiddish: אַקמיאַן/Akmian, Polish: Okmiany, Russian: Окмяны/Okmiany. Up to 17th century the place was known as Dabikinė.

== History ==
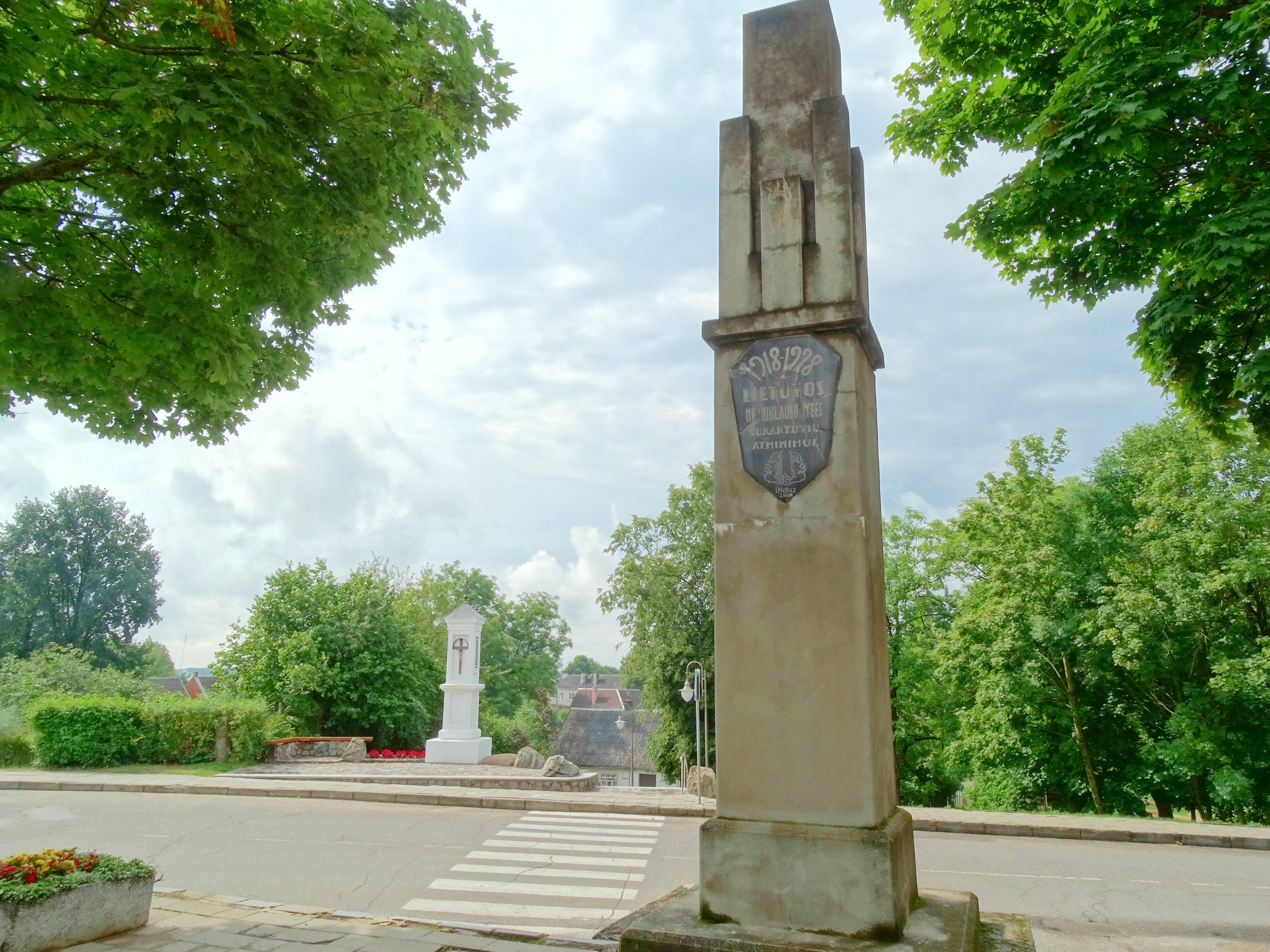
A monument to Reinstating Independence of Lithuania

Akmenė is first mentioned as an estate owned by the Kęsgaila family circa 1511. In 1531 a privilege was granted by the Grand Duke of Lithuania Sigismund I the Old to build a town, named Dabikinė near te Dabikinė River. It was built in Wallach reform style. The town grew fast, and by the time there were 3 streets, 82 households and 28 inns in 1561. In 1596 Grand Duchess of Lithuania Anna Jagiellon founded a wooden church.

Town rights were granted to Akmenė in 1592.

The city was devastated and burned down in 1705 during the Swedish occupation after a nearby battle. A plague of 1710–1711 left the city without inhabitants, although it recovered fast, and in 1754 received a privilege to hold a market and four fairs per year. In 1792 Akmenė city rights were reconfirmed and a coat of arms was granted.

After the Partitions of Polish Lithuanian Commonwealth the neighborhoods were donated to the wife of Russian General Fitinhof.

== The Jewish community ==
According to the records Jews arrived in Akmenė in the eighteenth century. By the mid-nineteenth century the majority of the population in the town was Jewish. The first mass migration of Jews followed the notorious May Laws of 1882. Many of the Jews who left in the face of increasing Tsarist persecution settled in Cork, Ireland, where Jews today still refer to themselves as Akmianers.

In 1915, some of the Jews were expelled into the Russian interior.

By 1939 the Jewish community had fallen in number to around 30 families. At the end of June 1941, following the Nazi occupation of Lithuania, Jewish people were arrested. The Rollkommando Hamann with the help of local collaborators, shot and killed three Jews, and on August 4, 1941, all the remaining prisoners were transferred to three silos on the bank of the river Venta, near Mažeikiai. The men were taken immediately to dig pits and the women were imprisoned in Mažeikiai together with other Jewish women prisoners. All of them were murdered together with the Jews of Mažeikiai and the surroundings on August 9, 1941.
