= Venta (river) =

River in Latvia and Lithuania

Coordinates: 57°23′44″N 21°32′40″E

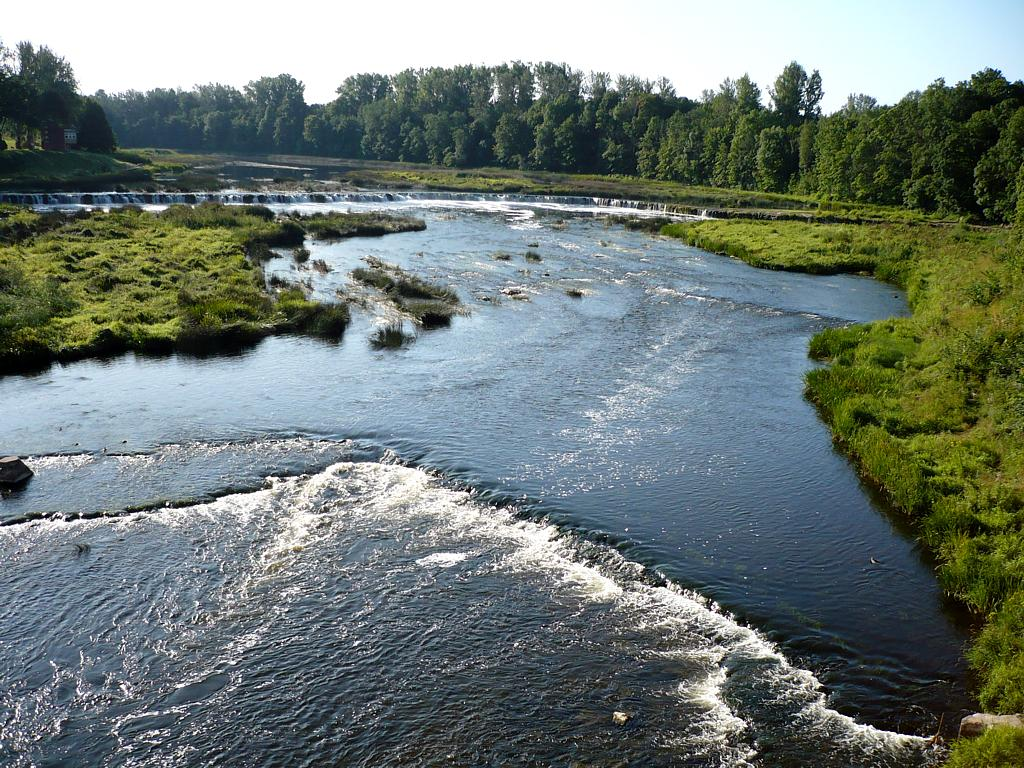
- The Venta river in Kuldīga

Location
- Country: Latvia (67%), Lithuania (33%)

Physical characteristics
- Source
  - location: near Užventis, Lithuania
- Mouth
  - location: Baltic Sea at Ventspils, Latvia.
- Length: 346 km (215 mi)(178 km or 111 mi in Latvia)
- Basin size: 11,800 km^{2} (4,600 sq mi)
- Discharge
  - average: 44 m^{3}/s (1,600 cu ft/s)

The Venta (Latvian pronunciation [ˈvænta], Lithuanian [venˈta], German: Windau, Polish: Windawa, Livonian Vǟnta joug) is a river in north-western Lithuania and western Latvia. Its source is near Kuršėnai in the Lithuanian Šiauliai County. It flows into the Baltic Sea at Ventspils in Latvia.

On the territory of Lithuania along the Venta are cities Užventis, Kuršėnai, Venta, Viekšniai and Mažeikiai. In Latvia, the cities of Skrunda, Kuldīga, Piltene and Ventspils are located on the Venta river. Venta Rapid, the widest waterfall in Europe, is on Venta river in Kuldīga, Latvia.

== Basin system ==
The river has only one tributary longer than 100 km, the Abava. Other major tributaries include the Virvyčia (99.7 km) and the Varduva (96 km), which flows into the Venta at the Latvia–Lithuania border.

Smaller tributaries include the Avižlys, which runs for 20 kilometers and flows into the Venta River and the 30 kilometre Uogys which joins the Venta less than 1 km upstream of the Avižlys at Akmenė district municipality, Šiauliai County, northern Lithuania.

== Geology ==
The Venta River valley exposes a record of Middle to Late Weichselian (ca 33,000 BP) environments beneath its modern floodplain. An area of roughly 80 km^{2} in northwest Lithuania is underlain by up to 28 m of ancient lake sediments—brown, grey and greenish-black clay, silt and fine sand with lenses of peat—buried beneath the uppermost Late Weichselian (Nemunas) till. At the Purviai outcrop, pollen analysis and radiocarbon dating (33,540 ± 370 and 33,800 ± 460 calibrated years before present) reveal initially cold, wet periglacial conditions dominated by open sedge (Cyperaceae) communities, followed by slight climatic amelioration marked by park-tundra vegetation of birch (Betula), pine (Pinus) and scattered spruce (Picea), showing that the climate warmed slightly from severe periglacial cold to a milder phase. Gravel layers within the sequence contain shells of the freshwater pearl mussel, Margaritifera margaritifera, signalling clean, fast-flowing stream channels feeding into the lake basin. Together, these data show that the Venta valley remained largely ice-free until at least 33,000 BP and that the main glacial advance over North Lithuania did not occur until after 25,000 BP.

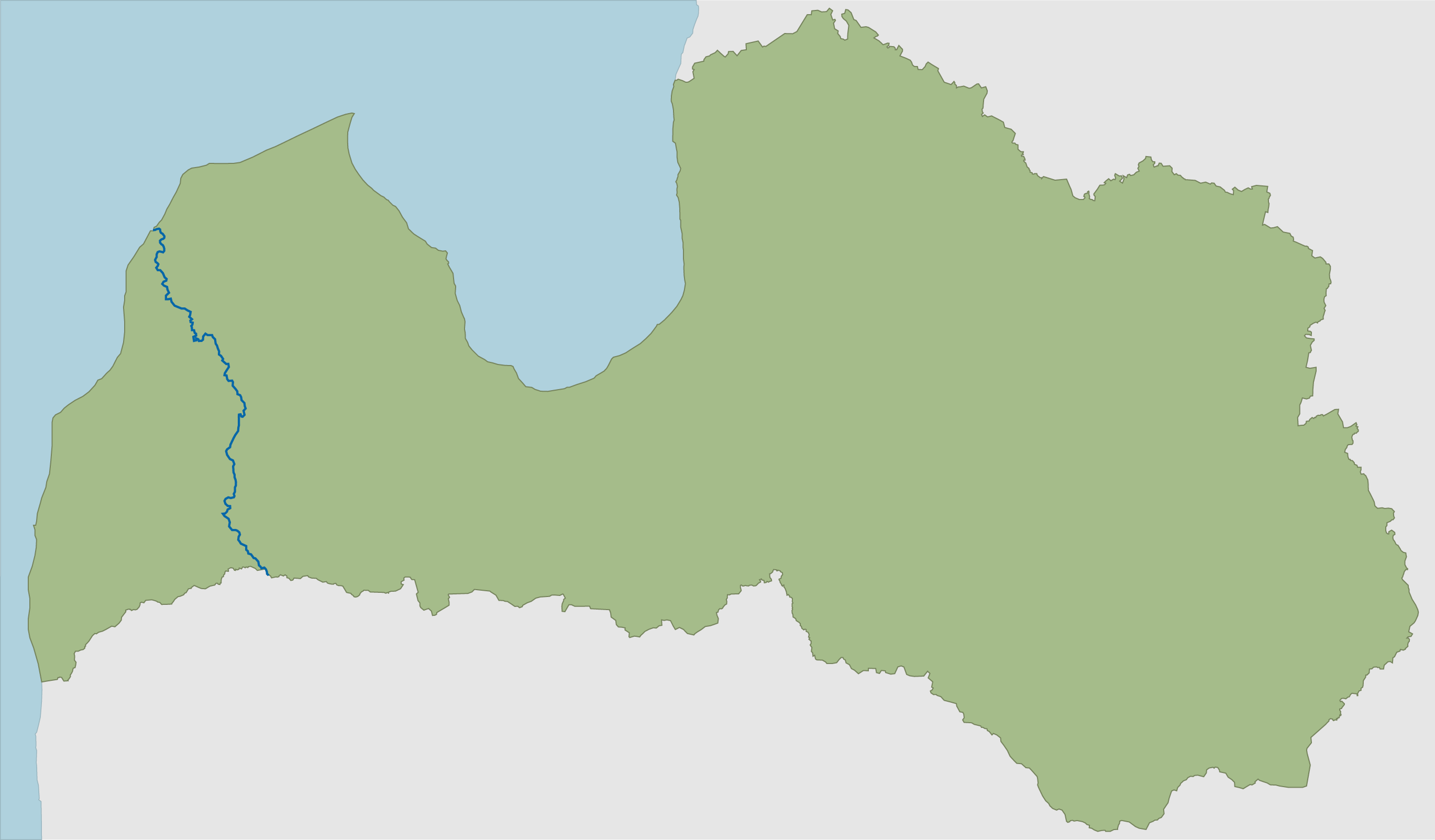
Venta in Latvia

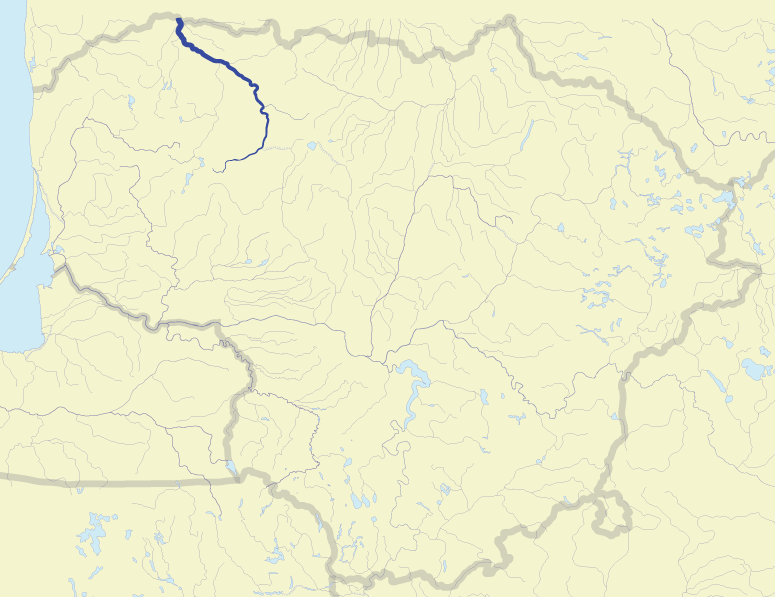
Venta in Lithuania

== Environmental issues ==
Local water-quality surveys show that as the Venta flows through Kuršėnai, soluble phosphorus roughly doubles—from about 0.069 milligrammes per litre (mg/L) upstream to 0.135 mg/L downstream—exceeding national water-quality limits. This rise in phosphorus matches a 15% increase in chlorophyll a (from 9.11 to 10.49 microgrammes per L), a standard indicator of algal biomass, and is accompanied by lush growth of duckweed species such as Lemna minor and Spirodela polyrhiza.

Nitrate concentrations also climb by roughly 50%, from 2.27 mg/L upstream to 3.44 mg/L downstream, often exceeding the 2.3 mg/L guideline. Nitrite levels and organic pollution (measured as chemical oxygen demand) likewise regularly surpass safe thresholds. Although healthy aquatic ecosystems typically have a nitrogen-to-phosphorus ratio near 16:1, here the ratio is about 45:1 above the town and 27:1 below it—showing that nitrogen remains in excess even as phosphorus spikes.

Investigation points to two main pollution pathways: insufficiently treated sewage entering via the Urdupis stream, and nutrient-rich runoff from the Pakulmušiai/Kumulša pond system. Together, these inputs fuel heavier algal blooms, dense water-plant cover and an overall decline in water quality downstream of Kuršėnai.

A 2016 joint Latvian–Lithuanian study applied WFD mixing-zone guidelines (rules under the EU Water Framework Directive that allow a defined stretch of river immediately below a discharge to temporarily exceed pollution limits before returning to standard levels) to twelve wastewater-discharge sites in the transboundary Venta River Basin. Under low-flow "worst-case" conditions they found that the river lengths needed to dilute total phosphorus and nitrogen discharges to EU standard levels varied from a few metres up to several hundred metres—and in small tributaries even became effectively "unlimited", meaning standards could not be met within the available channel. Of all the priority substances analysed, only nickel required a particularly long mixing zone (over 900 m) to meet the newer bioavailable-nickel standard.

== See also ==
- Ventas rumba
