= Akmenė District Municipality =

Akmenė District Municipality Akmenės rajono savivaldybė
- District Municipality
- Flag Coat of arms

- Location of Akmenė District Municipality within Lithuania

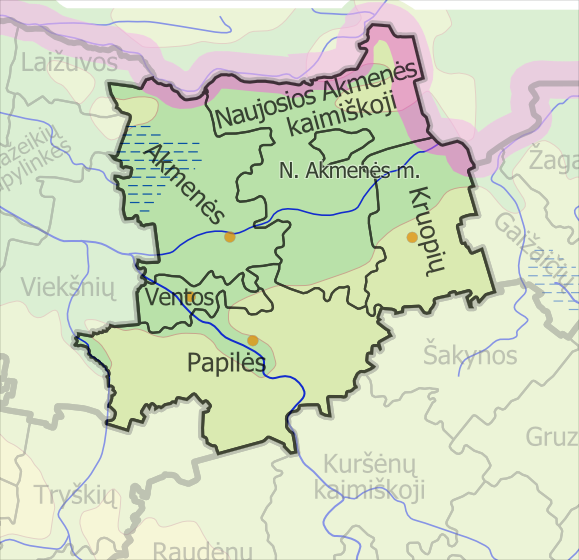
- Location of Akmenė
- Coordinates: 56°15′22″N 22°45′14″E
- Country: Lithuania
- Region: Žemaitija
- County: Šiauliai County
- Established: 1950 (76 years ago)
- Capital: Naujoji Akmenė
- Elderships: 6

Government
  - Type: City Council
  - Body: Akmenė District Council
  - Mayor: Vitalijus Mitrofanovas (LSDP)
  - Leading: Social Democratic Party 16 / 25

Area
  - Total: 844 km^{2} (326 sq mi)
  - Rank: 43rd
- Elevation: 110 m (360 ft)

Population (2022)
  - Total: 19,287
  - Rank: 45th
  - Density: 22.85/km^{2} (59.2/sq mi)
  - Rank: 30th
- Time zone: UTC+2 (EET)
  - Summer (DST): UTC+3 (EEST)
- ZIP Codes: 85001–86114
- Phone code: +370 (425)
- Website: www.akmene.lt

Akmenė District Municipality (Lithuanian: Akmenės rajono savivaldybė) is one of 60 municipalities in Lithuania. It lies in the Northwest of the country, with the administrative center in Naujoji Akmenė and borders Latvia in the north, Joniškis District in the east, Šiauliai District in the southeast, Telšiai District in the southwest, and Mažeikiai District in the west. The area of the municipality covers ca. 844 km^{2} and is the 43rd largest municipality by total area in the country. Its population shrank from some 30,300 (2001 census) to 18,500 (2021 census) which is around 39% in decline.

== History ==
Akmenė district with the center in the town of Akmenė was founded on June 20, 1950, when the reform of territorial-administrative units was introduced to the Lithuanian SSR. It was made up of former Kuršėnai county and its 14 elderates, and 23 elderates of the then-former Mažeikiai county. In 1950–1953 the district belonged to Šiauliai County. During the dissolution of Žagarė district, 4 of its elderates were absorbed by Akmenė district in 1959. Additionally, some elderates were incorporated into the Akmenė district upon the Kuršėnai district abolishment in 1962. Naujoji Akmene became the capital of the district then.

On December 8, 1962, the district was abolished and merged with Mažeikiai district but was soon re-formed on January 7, 195 by giving 8 elderates of Mažeikiai district (Akmenė, Alkiškės, Kairiškės, Medemrodė, Papilė, Svirkančiai, Vegeriai, Venta), as well as elderates of Akmenė, Naujoji Akmenė, Viekšniai, and 1 elderate of Joniškis district (Kruopiai). During 1968–1971 boundaries of the district were slightly changed.

In 1995, Akmenė District Municipality had emerged from Akmenė district and Venta with Viekšniai became cities. During the municipal reform in 1999, Viekšniai elderate (areas of Kapėnai, Pakalupis, Santelkiai, Svirkančiai, Viekšniai) was merged with Mažeikiai District Municipality. Municipal council resolution No. T-11 on January 21, 2009, established 6 elderates and 23 elderships in Akmenė District Municipality.

== Elderships ==
Akmenė district municipality is divided into 6 elderships:

Eldership	Coat of arms	Administrative center	Area	Population
Akmenė		Akmenė	190.5 km^{2} (47,073.58 acres; 73.55 sq mi)	3,833
Kruopiai		Kruopiai	129.4 km^{2} (31,975.44 acres; 49.96 sq mi)	835
Naujoji Akmenė Rural		Naujoji Akmenė	240 km^{2} (59,305.29 acres; 92.66 sq mi)	1,963
Naujoji Akmenė City		Naujoji Akmenė	10.7 km^{2} (2,644.03 acres; 4.13 sq mi)	8,441
Papilė		Papilė	238 km^{2} (58,811.08 acres; 91.89 sq mi)	2,666
Venta		Venta	35.3 km^{2} (8,722.82 acres; 13.63 sq mi)	3,161

== Largest settlements ==
Order	Name	Population
1.	Naujoji Akmenė	7,194
2.	Akmenė	2,593
3.	Venta	2,250

== Geography ==
The territory of the municipality flows Venta with tributaries Virvyte, Dabikine, and Vadakstis, which is part of Venta Regional Park, Kamanai Reserve, Girkančiai and Karniškės Telmological Reserves. Forests make up 31,6% of the territory (the largest forests are: Kamanai, Lydmiškis, Purviai, and Viliošiai), peatlands make up around 6,5% and there is a Lake Telkšas.

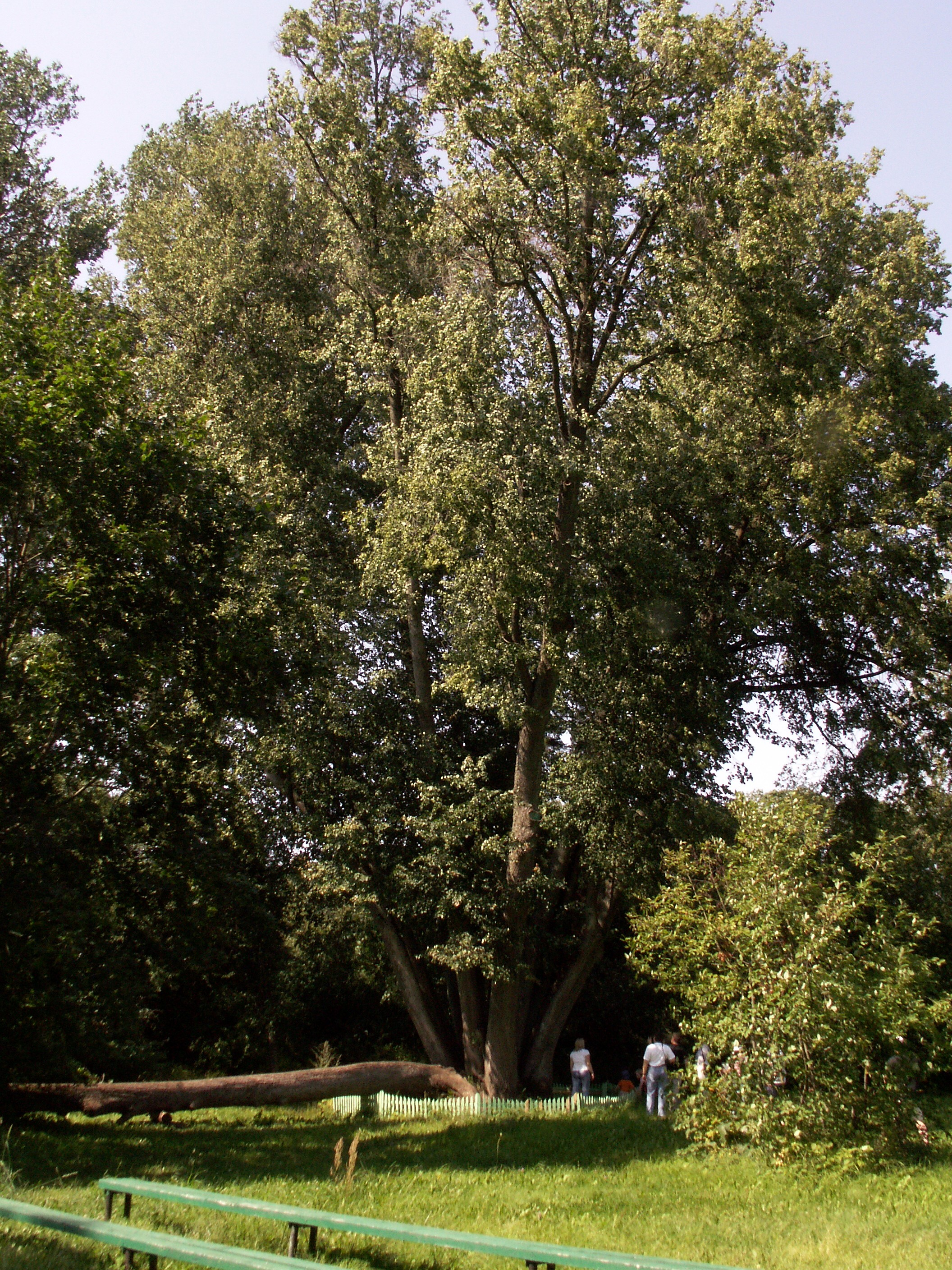
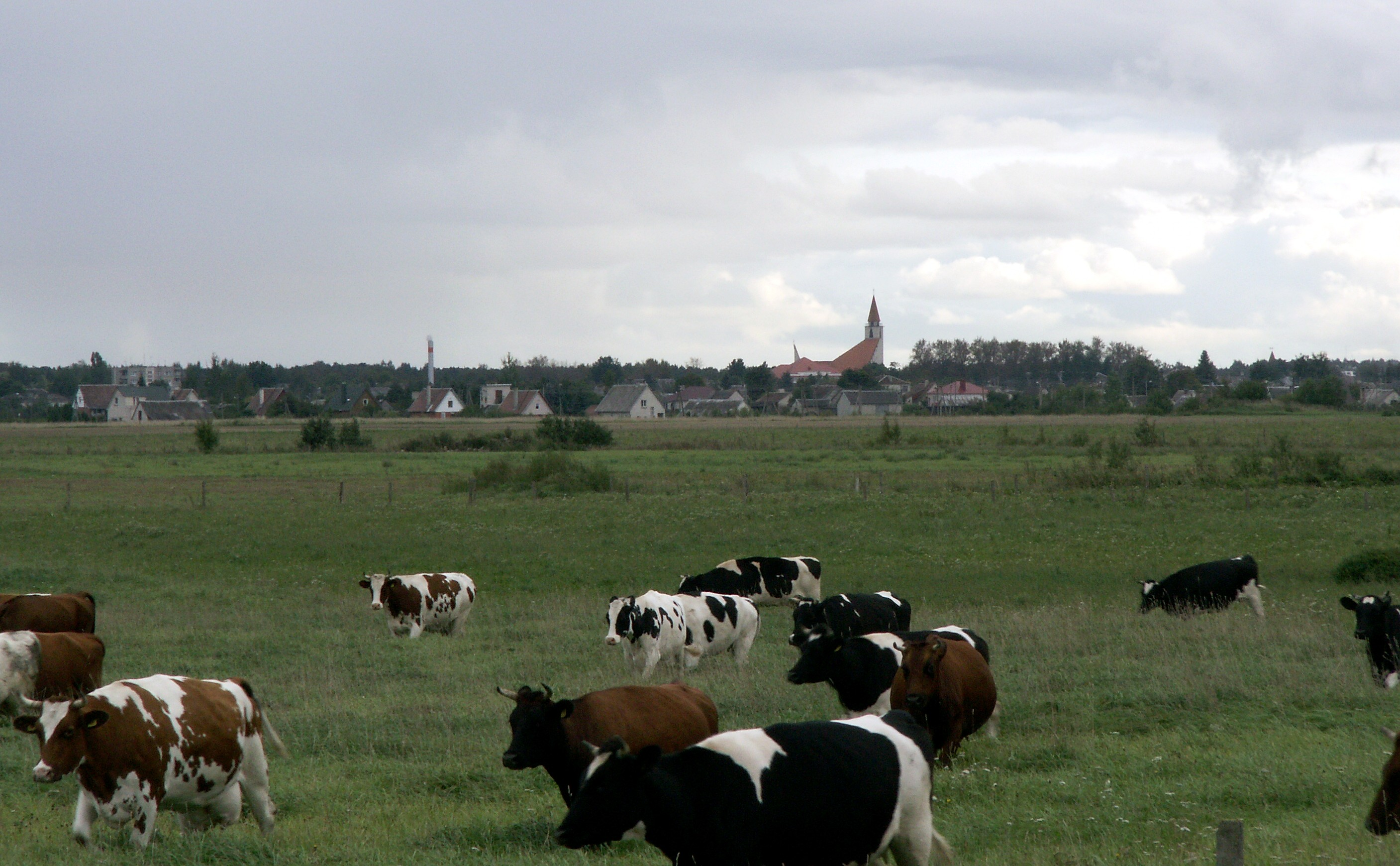

== Politics ==
The Board of the district is made up of 4 parliamentary parties where Social Democratic Party got the most – 12 seats. Farmers and Greens Union and Liberal Movement each got 5 seats, while Homeland Union secured 2 seats. The Mayor of Akmenė District Municipality is Vitalijus Mitrofanovas who secured the mayoral position in the Lithuanian municipality and mayor elections held in 2019. The mayoral election was won Social Democrats' candidate meaning the party has 13 out of 25 seats in Akmenė District Municipality in total.

== COVID-19 pandemic ==
The first case of COVID-19 in Akmenė District Municipality was recorded on April 5, 2020. During the pandemic, over 1,000 cases were confirmed in the district and on March 30, 2021, around 14% of the total population in the district had been vaccinated. The Lithuanian Cabinet has de facto approved of a decentralized plan for municipalities to leave the lockdown under certain criteria. However, the national lockdown was extended until May 1, 2021, while movement restrictions on the municipal level were re-introduced on March 27, 2021, and will continue until April 6, 2021. According to the de-escalation plan, Akmenė District Municipality is in the Orange B2 zone meaning is relatively safe from COVID-19.

De-escalation plan for COVID-19
Scenario	Zone	New cases in 14 days per 100,000 population	Positive tests in 14 days
A	Green	0–25	0–4%
B1	Yellow	25–50	0–4%
B2	Orange	50–100	0–4%
C1	Pink	100–150	0–4%
C2	Light Red	150–200	4–8%
C3	Dark Red	200–500	4–8%
D	Grey	500 and more	10% and more

== See also ==
- Baubliai (Akmenė District)
