= Padubysis =

- Village
- Location of Padubysis
- Coordinates: 55°33′43″N 23°04′37″E
- Country: Lithuania
- Ethnographic region: Samogitia
- County: Šiauliai County
- Municipality: Kelmė District Municipality
- Eldership: Loliai eldership

Population (2011)
  - Total: 24
- Time zone: UTC+2 (EET)
  - Summer (DST): UTC+3 (EEST)

Padubysis is a village in the Kelmė District Municipality in Lithuania.

== History ==
Before World War II, the village was a shtetl; the majority of the inhabitants were Jews until the German invasion of Russia in June 1941. On August 15 and 16, 1941, 120 Jews from Padubysis and the nearby villages of Lyduvėnai and Bulavėnai were murdered in a mass execution perpetrated by German Einsatzgruppen and local Lithuanian collaborators. A stele has been erected on the site of the massacre.
