= Šaukėnai Eldership =

Eldership of Lithuania

The Šaukėnai Eldership (Lithuanian: Šaukėnų seniūnija) is an eldership of Lithuania, located in the Kelmė District Municipality. In 2021 its population was 1875.
