= A Lyga (volleyball) =

Lithuanian volleyball league

- Founded: 1947
- Country: Lithuania
- Confederation: CEV
- Number of clubs: 5
- Level on pyramid: 1

The A Lyga is the highest level men's volleyball club tournament in Lithuania.

== History ==
From 1935 to 1943 Volleyball Championships of Kaunas City was held. First national-wide championships were held in 1947. Teams from Vilnius won the most titles.

== Teams ==
Name	City
VGTU-MRU	Vilnius
Antivis-Etovis	Kelmė
Flamingo Volley-SM Tauras	Vilnius
Elga-Master Idea-SM Dubys	Šiauliai
Raseiniai-Norvelita	Raseiniai
