= Kražiai Eldership =

Eldership of Lithuania

The Kražiai Eldership (Lithuanian: Kražių seniūnija) is an eldership of Lithuania, located in the Kelmė District Municipality. In 2021 its population was 2050.
