= Klovainiai Eldership =

Eldership of Lithuania

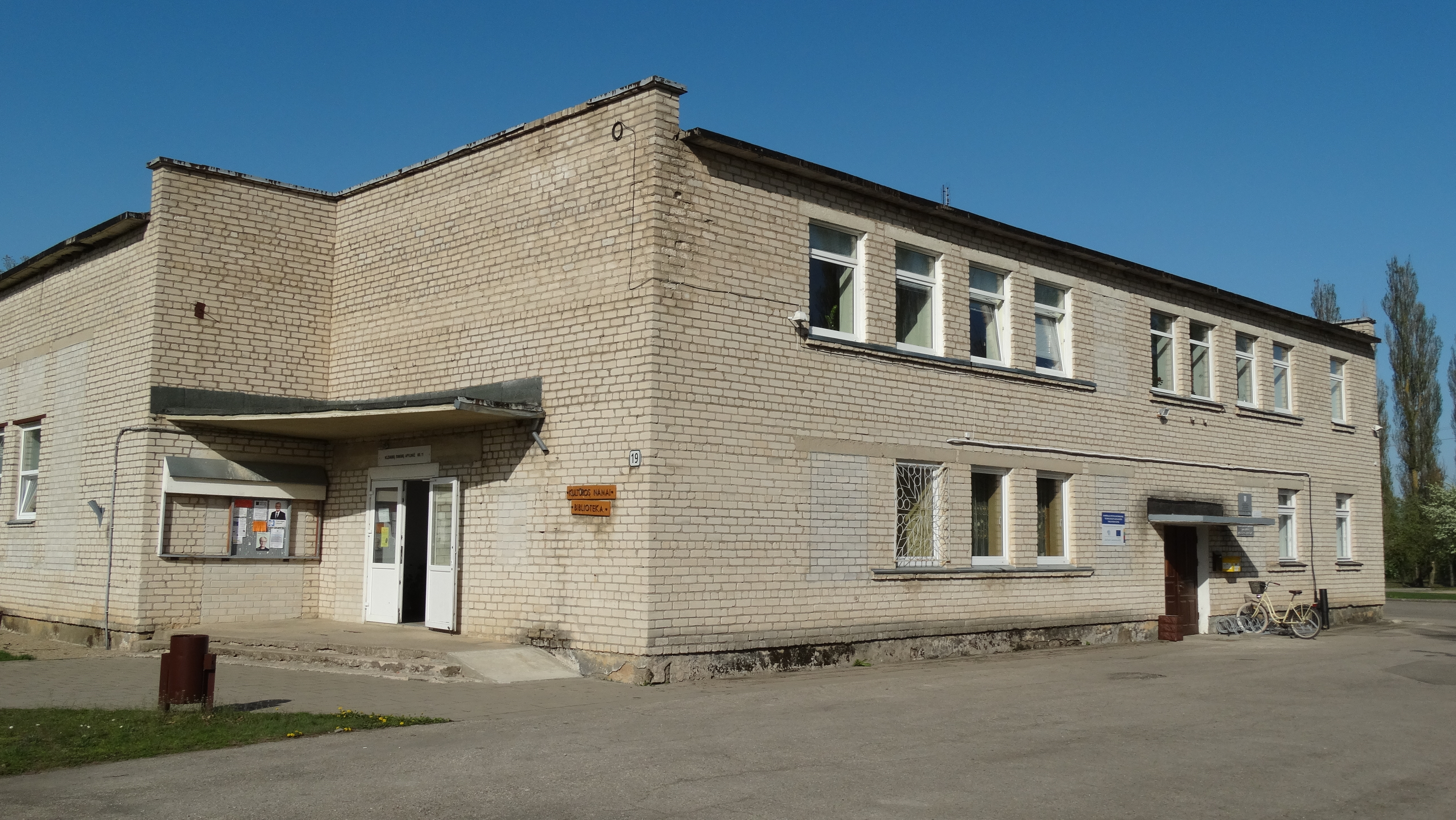
Eldership, Klovainiai, Pakruojis district, Lithuania

The Klovainiai Eldership (Lithuanian: Klovainių seniūnija) is an eldership of Lithuania, located in the Pakruojis District Municipality. In 2021 its population was 2122.
