= Užventis =

City in Šiauilai, Lithuania

- City
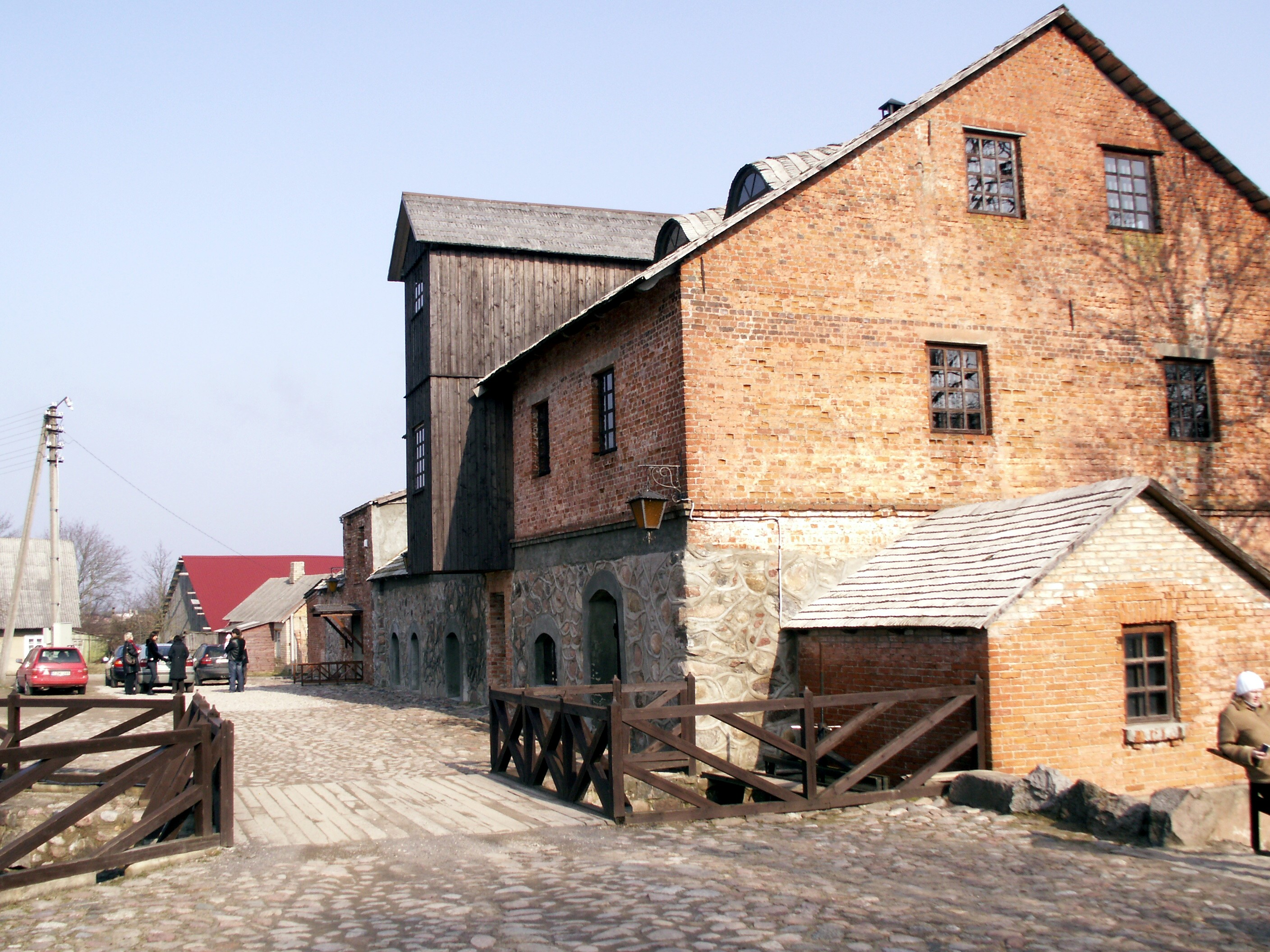

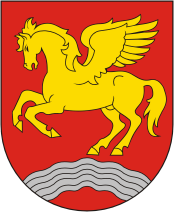
- Coat of arms

- Location of Užventis
- Coordinates: 55°47′N 22°39′E
- Country: Lithuania
- Ethnographic region: Samogitia
- County: Šiauliai County
- Municipality: Kelmė district municipality
- Eldership: Užventis eldership
- Capital of: Užventis rural eldership
- First mentioned: 1527
- Granted city rights: 1746

Population (2022)
  - Total: 598
- Time zone: UTC+2 (EET)
  - Summer (DST): UTC+3 (EEST)

Užventis (Samogitian: Ožvėntis) is a city in the Kelmė district municipality, Lithuania. It is located 25 km (16 mi) north-west of Kelmė. River Venta flows through the city.

== Etymology ==
Užventis is a place name derived from the river named Venta by adding the prefix " už- ", as the town is located upstream of Venta. In the interwar period of the 20th century, the form Užventys was most commonly used. In other languages, the town is known by: Polish: Użwenty, Yiddish: אוזשווענט Uzhvent.

== History ==
It was a tract seat in the Duchy of Samogitia within the Polish–Lithuanian Commonwealth.

In 1923, 173 Jews lived in the village, comprising 22 percent of the total population. The Lithuanian white armband squad formed in Užventis just after the German invasion, and they gathered Jewish residents of the village in the brewery in early July 1941. Jews were humiliated and forced to do various kinds of work for several weeks. At the end of July, the white armbanders dug a large pit in the Želviai forest. The next day, they rounded up the majority of the Jews from the ghetto (about 50-70 people), brought them to the execution place and shot them. Several groups of Jewish men who were fit to work were taken to Šiauliai and Žagarė. About 20 Jews who were left in Užventis were executed in the Želviai forest in December 1941.

Užventis is well known for its church.
