= Tytuvėnai Area Eldership =

Eldership of Lithuania

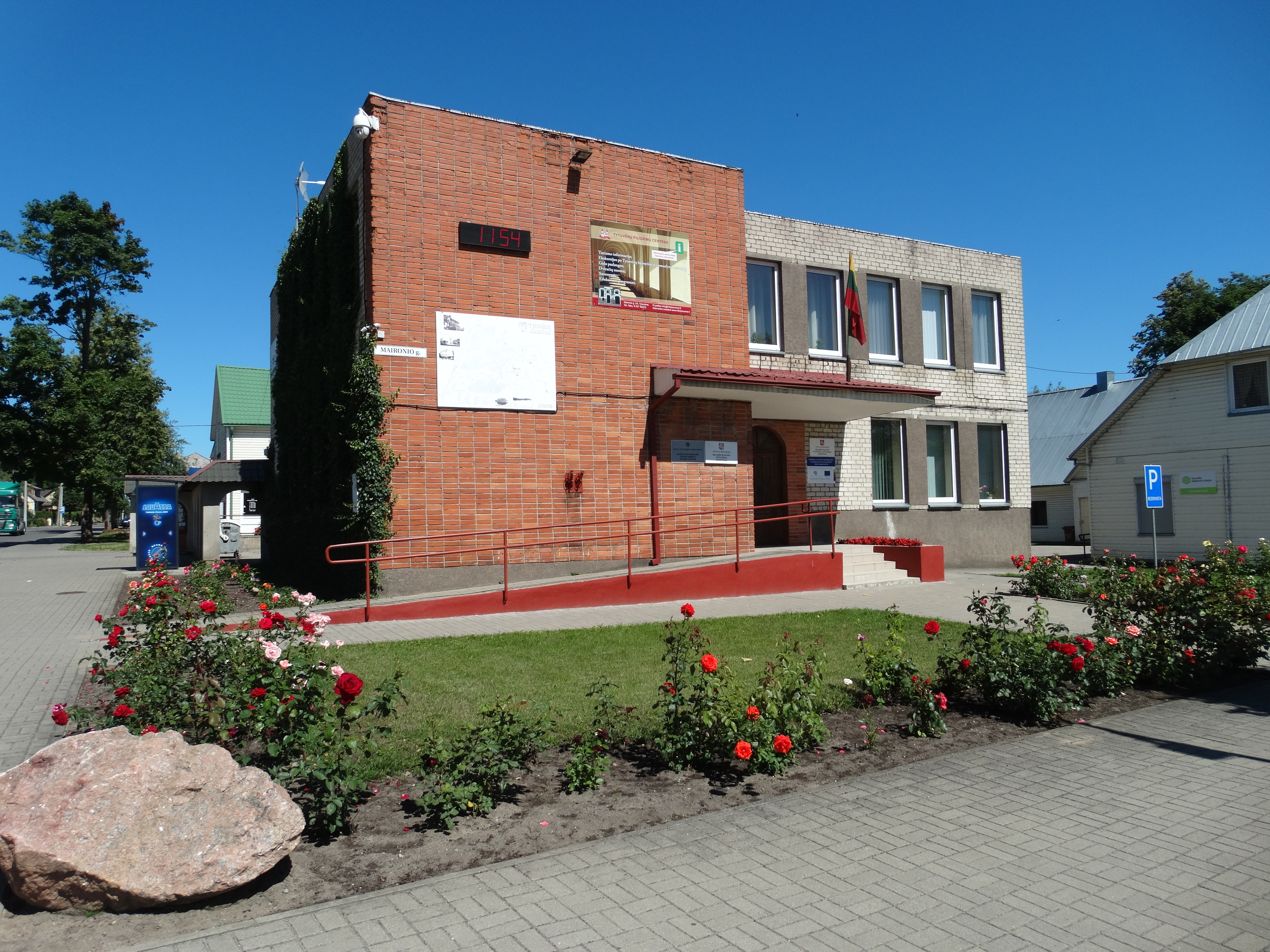
Eytuvėnai Eldership building, Kelmė district, Lithuania

The Tytuvėnai Eldership (Lithuanian: Tytuvėnų apylinkių seniūnija) is an eldership of Lithuania, located in the Kelmė District Municipality. In 2021 its population was 2414.
