= Vaiguva Eldership =

Eldership of Lithuania

The Vaiguva Eldership (Lithuanian: Vaiguvos seniūnija) is an eldership of Lithuania, located in the Kelmė District Municipality. In 2021 its population was 722.
