= Lygumai Eldership =

Eldership of Lithuania

The Lygumai Eldership (Lithuanian: Lygumų seniūnija) is an eldership of Lithuania, located in the Pakruojis District Municipality. In 2021 its population was 1885.
