= Lioliai Eldership =

Eldership of Lithuania

The Lioliai Eldership (Lithuanian: Liolių seniūnija) is an eldership of Lithuania, located in the Kelmė District Municipality. In 2021 its population was 1947.
