= Linkuva Eldership =

Eldership of Lithuania

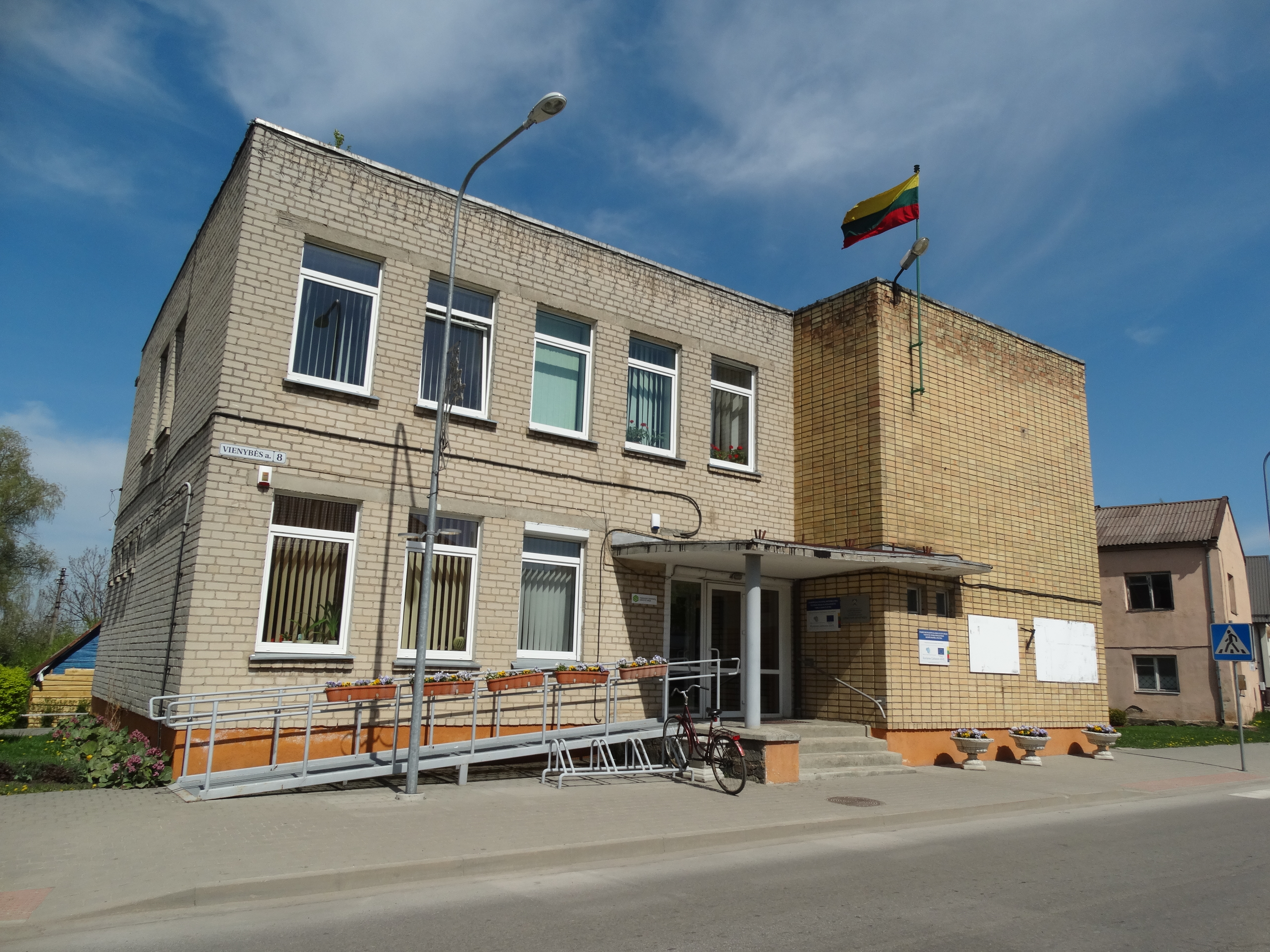
Linkuva, Pakruojis District, Lithuania

The Linkuva Eldership (Lithuanian: Linkuvos seniūnija) is an eldership of Lithuania, located in the Pakruojis District Municipality. In 2021 its population was 2688.
