= Guostagalis Eldership =

Eldership of Lithuania

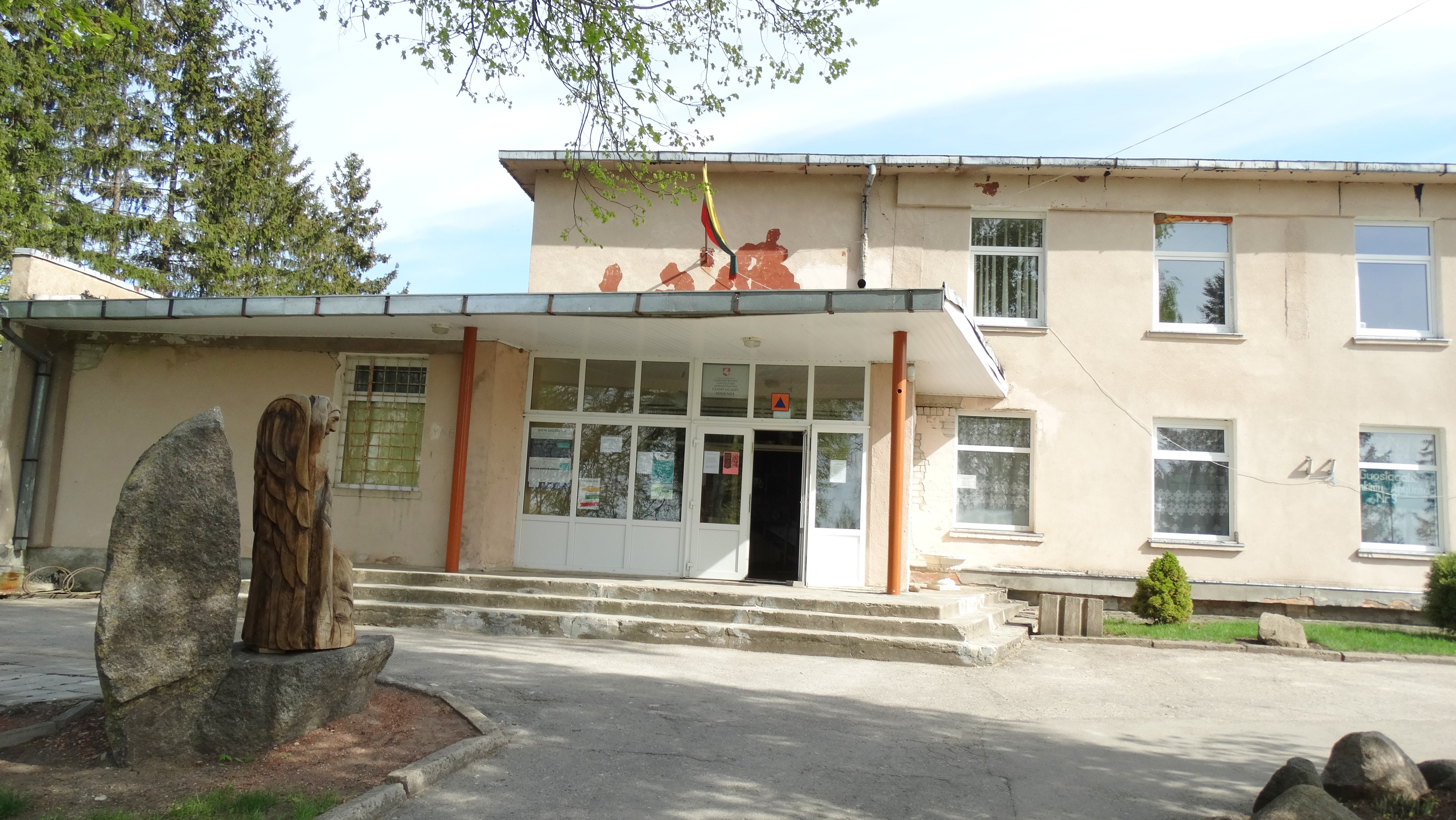
Guostagalis, Pakruojis District, Lithuania

The Guostagalis Eldership (Lithuanian: Guostagalio seniūnija) is an eldership of Lithuania, located in the Pakruojis District Municipality. In 2021 its population was 1038.
