= Aryeh Leib Frumkin =

Founder of Petah Tikva, Israel

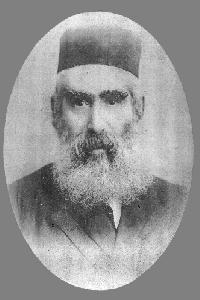
- Born: 1845; Kelmė, Lithuania
- Died: 1916 (aged 70–71); Petah Tikva, Mutassarifate of Jerusalem, Syrian provinces of the Ottoman Empire
- Occupations: Rabbi, pioneer, author
- Relatives: Jonathan Sacks (great-grandson)

Aryeh Leib Frumkin (Hebrew: אריה ליב פרומקין; 1845–1916) was a rabbi, Zionist, a founder and pioneer of Petah Tikva, the first moshava created by the Jewish community. He also was an author of halachic texts, a teacher, and operator of a wine shop, L. Frumkin and Company.

== Biography ==
Aryeh Leib Frumkin was born in Kelmė, Lithuania in 1845. He immigrated to Eretz Yisrael (Mutassarifate of Jerusalem, Syrian provinces of the Ottoman Empire at the time) before the First Aliyah in 1871. His great-grandson, Rabbi Jonathan Sacks, wrote, "My great-grandfather Rabbi Arye Leib Frumkin went to Israel in 1871; his father had settled there twenty years earlier. His first act was to begin writing his History of the Sages in Jerusalem, chronicling the Jewish presence there since Nachmanides arrived in 1265." While there he founded the settlement of Petah Tikva in which he built the first house and helped to drain the malaria-ridden swamps. His planting of the first tree there is emblazoned on the seal of the municipality and there is a street named after him.

Frumkin moved to London, England in 1893 after an Arab attack on Petah Tikva. In London's East End he operated a family wine shop. He later returned to Petah Tikva.

He died in 1916 in Petah Tikva, where he was buried.

== Legacy ==
Frumkin is the great-grandfather of Rabbi Jonathan Sacks, the previous Chief Rabbi of the United Kingdom.
