= Kelmė Manor =

Coordinates: 55°38′18″N 22°56′18″E

- Kelmės dvaras
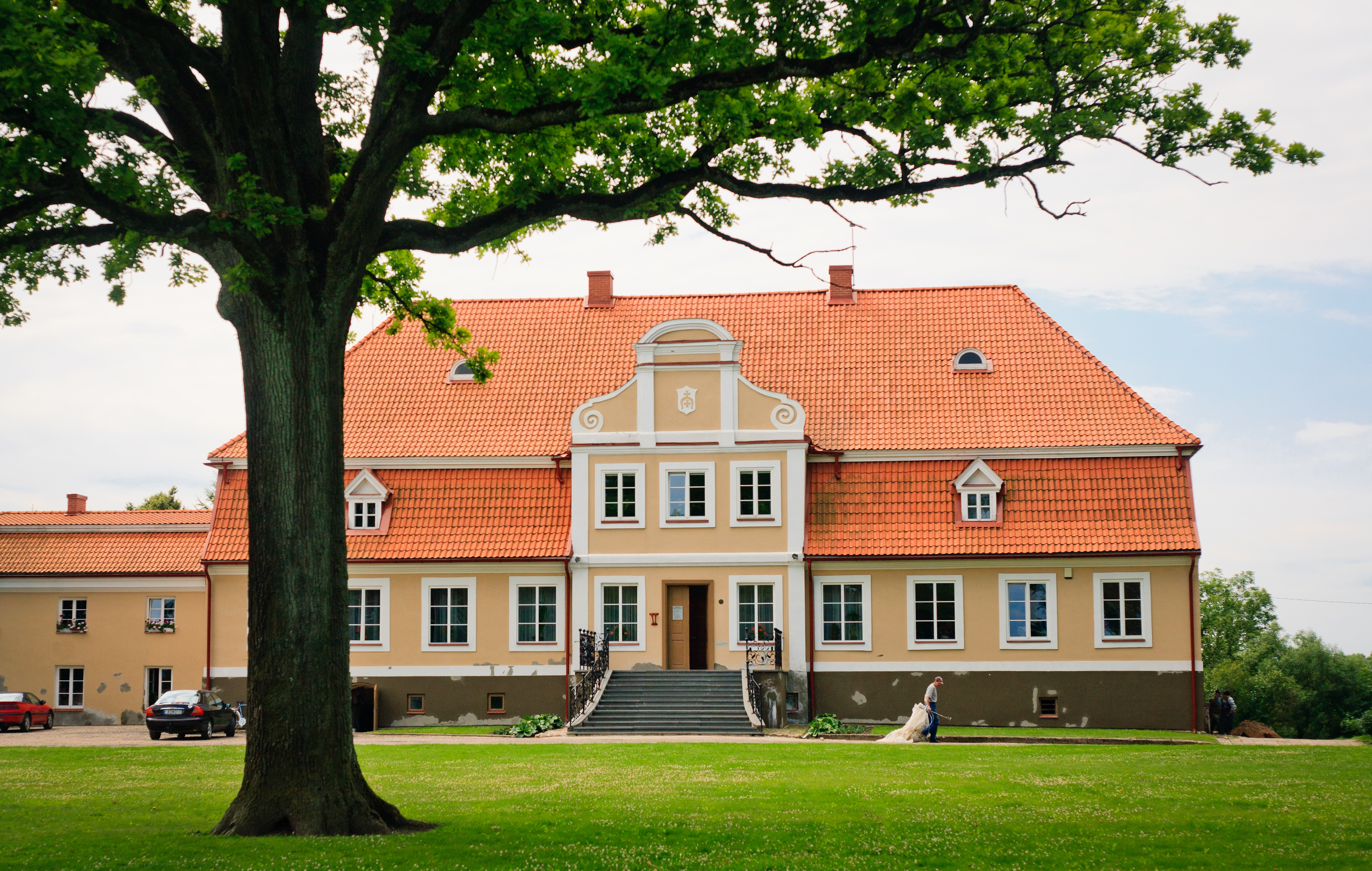
- Kelmė Manor
- Interactive map of Kelmė Manor

General information
- Architectural style: Baroque
- Location: Kelmė, Šiauliai County, Lithuania
- Year built: 1780

Kelmė Manor is a former residential manor in Kelmė, Lithuania. Currently it is occupied by Kelmė Regional Museum. Of the nine buildings on the 15.2 hectare estate, three are used for the display of museum artifacts.

== History ==
The Kelmė Estate dates back to the 15th century, when it was owned by the Grand Duke of Lithuania. It was passed to Jonas Kontautas at the end of the century, then to the Polish Gruzewski family in 1591. They actively supported the Reformation, establishing a Protestant parish in Kelmė in 1596, and they built the Protestant church in 1622 and founded the first school in Kelmė. They also established an extensive library and archive of Reformation history, which includes about 5000 rare volumes, as well as numismatic collections including Greek and Roman coins.

The manor was built about 1780 and was owned for many years by the Grużewski family. In 1831, Kelmė Estate was at the centre of an unsuccessful rebellion against Czarist Russia. Work was done on the manor in 1892 by architect F. Lehmann, and a project to establish a park was prepared in 1898, and in 1892 Bronislavas Gruzewski established a butter manufacturing company Biruta.

In 1940 the estate was taken over, and the owners, Gabriele Grużewska and her daughters Sofia and Adolfina, were expelled and eventually exiled to Siberia. Baron von Haren occupied the estate during the German occupation, and in 1941 the archive was moved to the Aušros museum in Šiauliai, from which it was transferred to the Library of the Lithuanian Academy of Sciences in 1952.

After the war the manor was used as a school, the Centre of Soviet Economy of Aviculture.

A historic barn on the estate was restored and renovated as part of the museum and opened in January 2010, funded by €289,877 from the Norwegian Financial Mechanism in Lithuania.

== Gallery ==
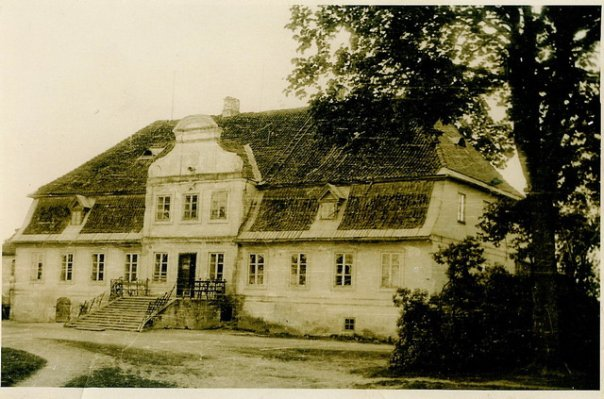
Kelmė Manor (1938)

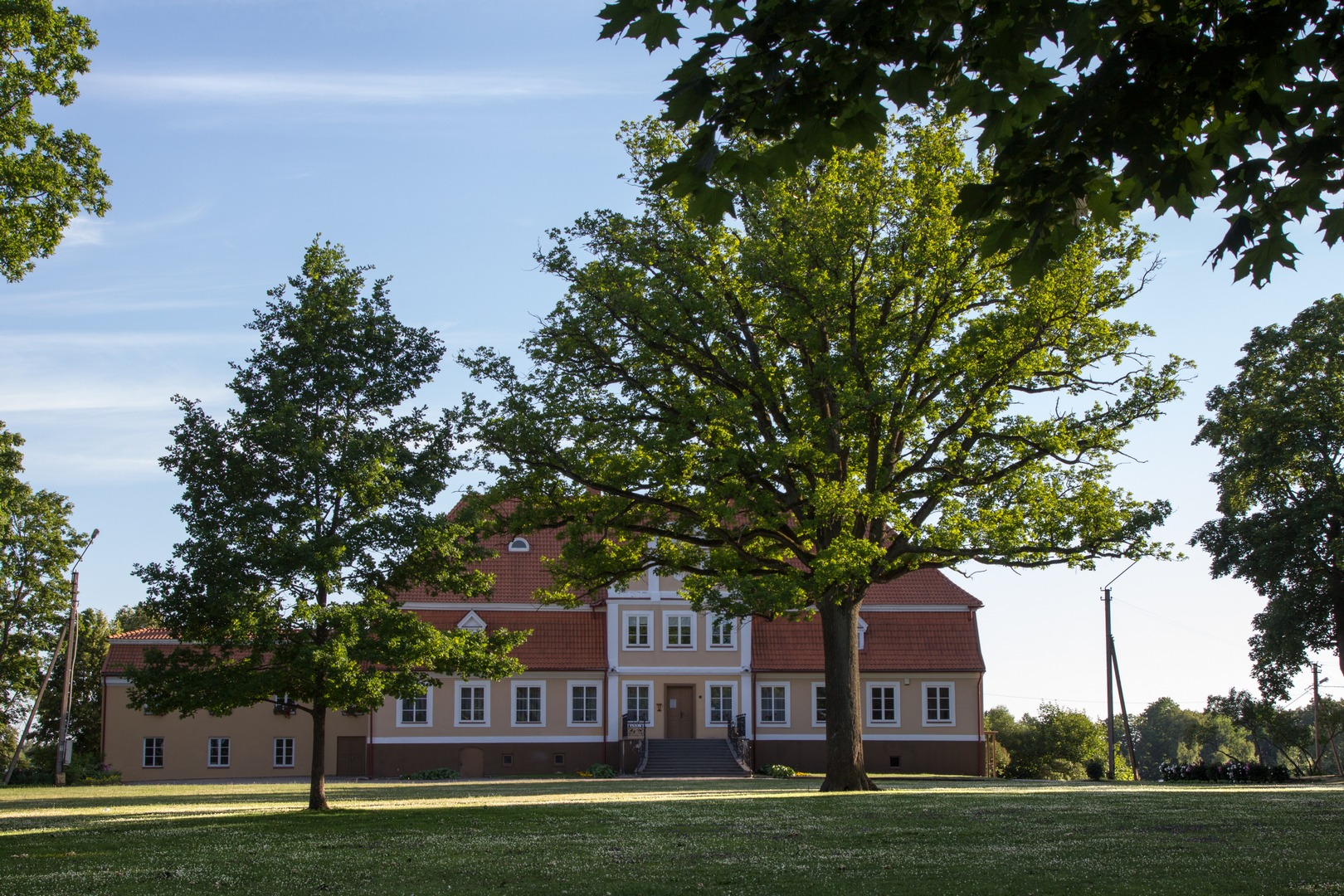
Kelmė Manor (front)

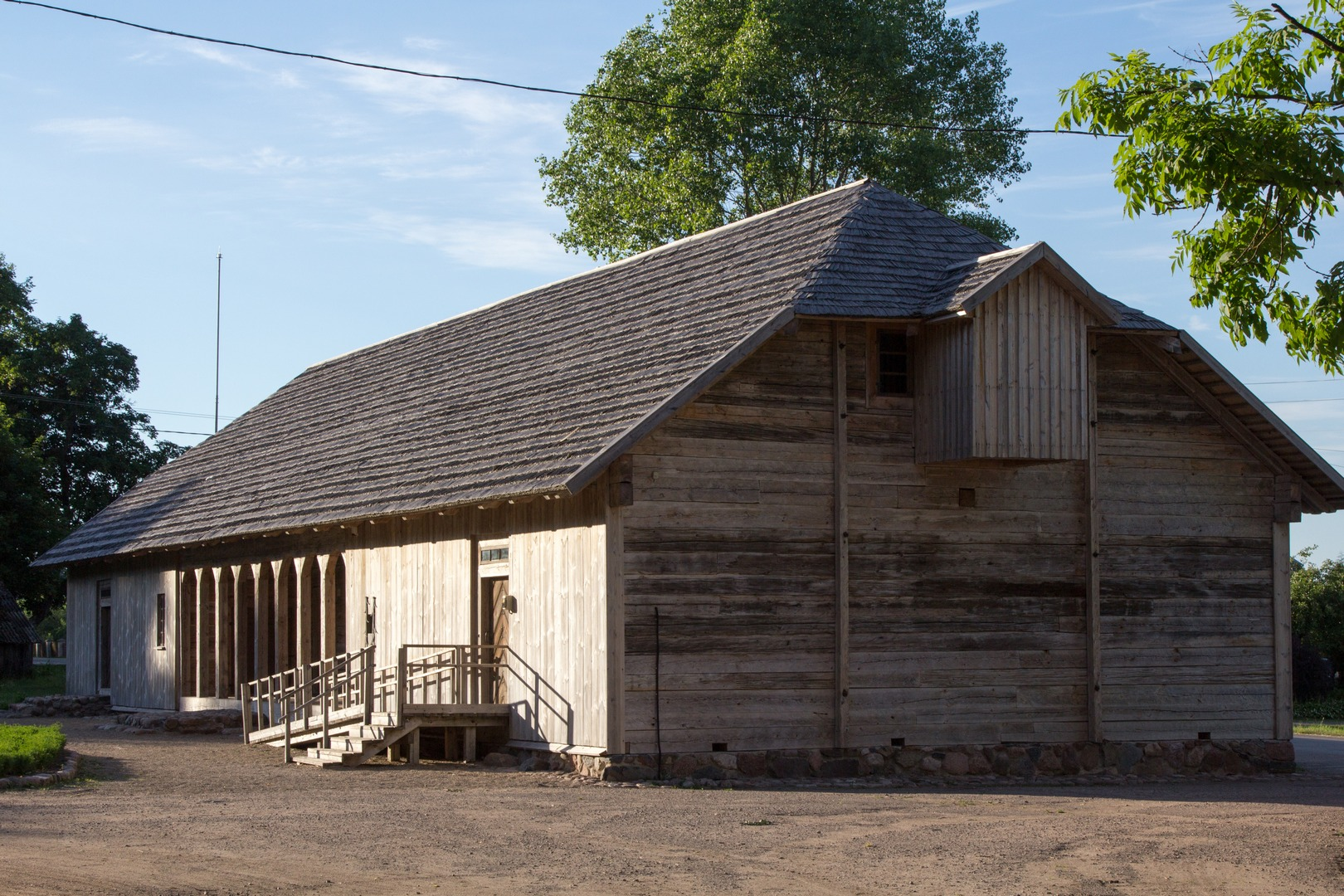
Barn

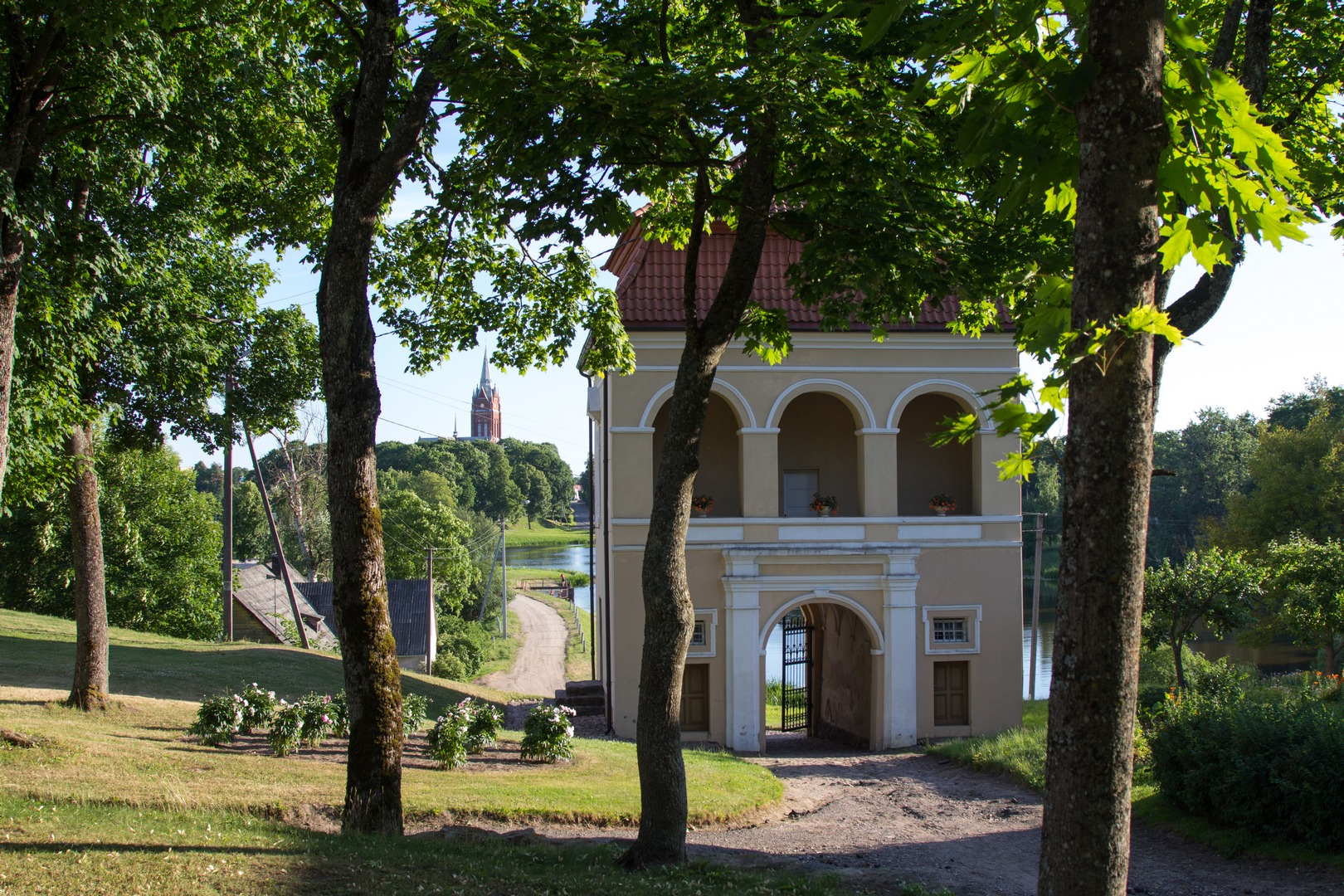
Gates
