= Linkuva =

- Town
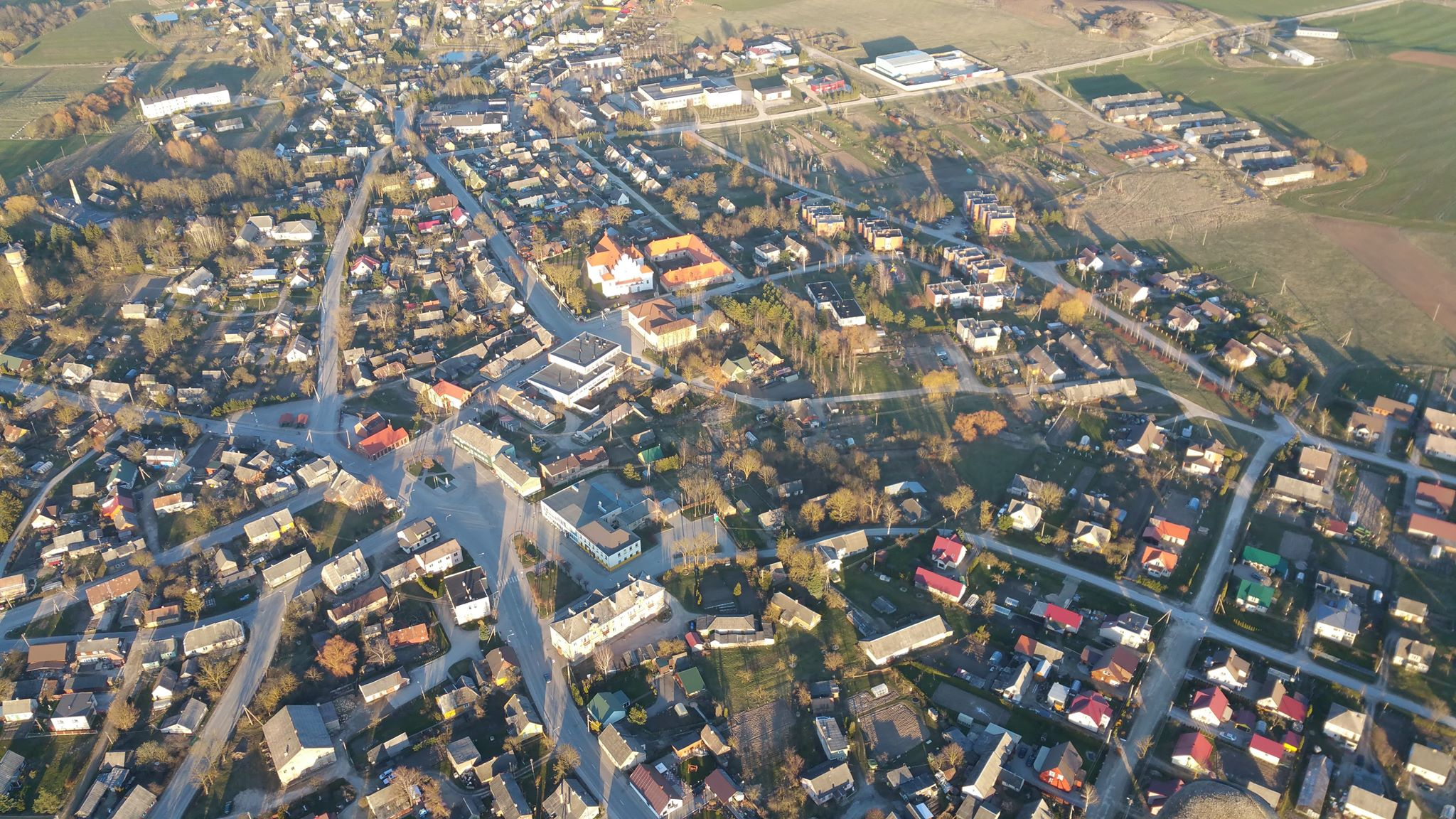
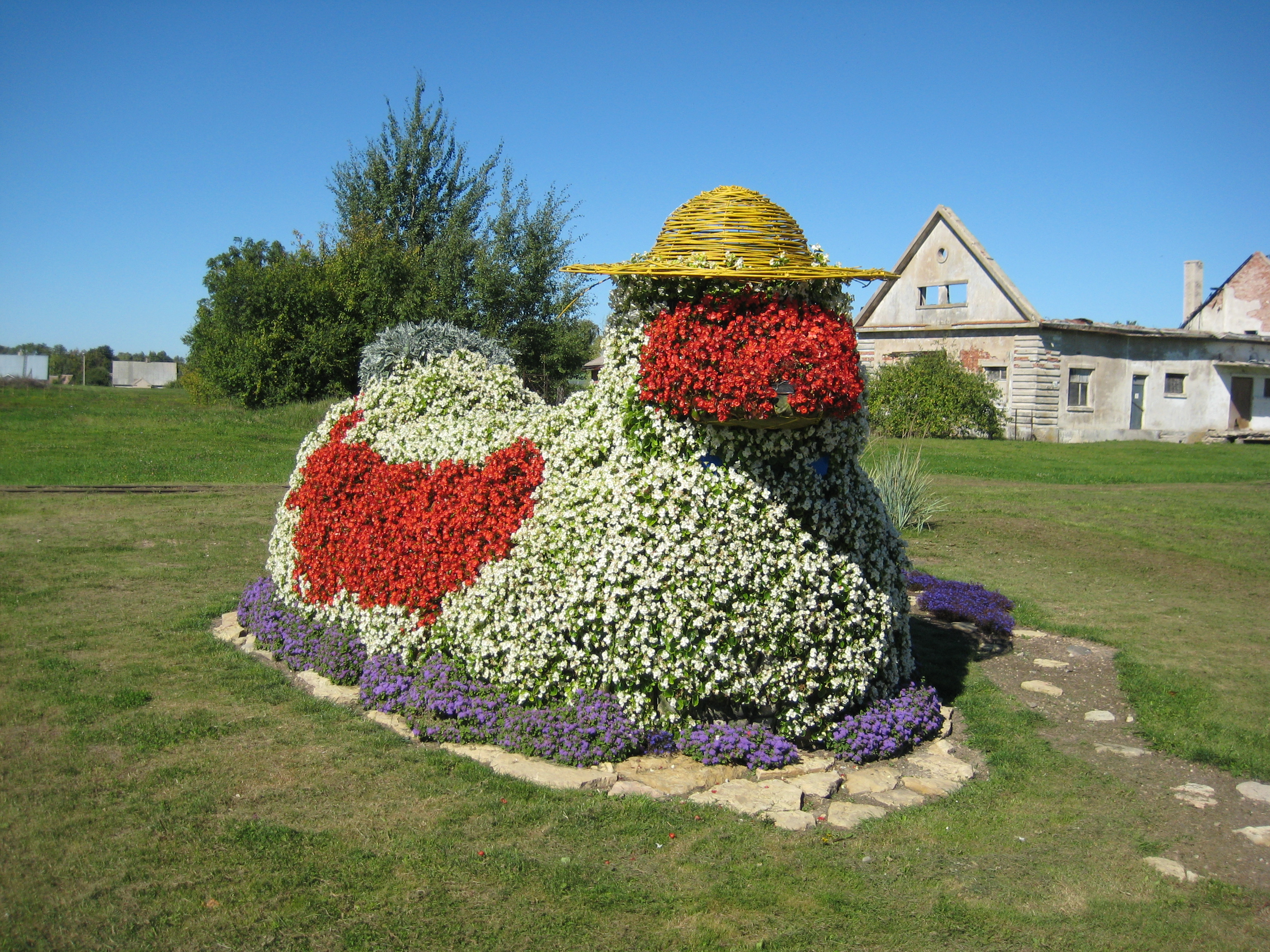
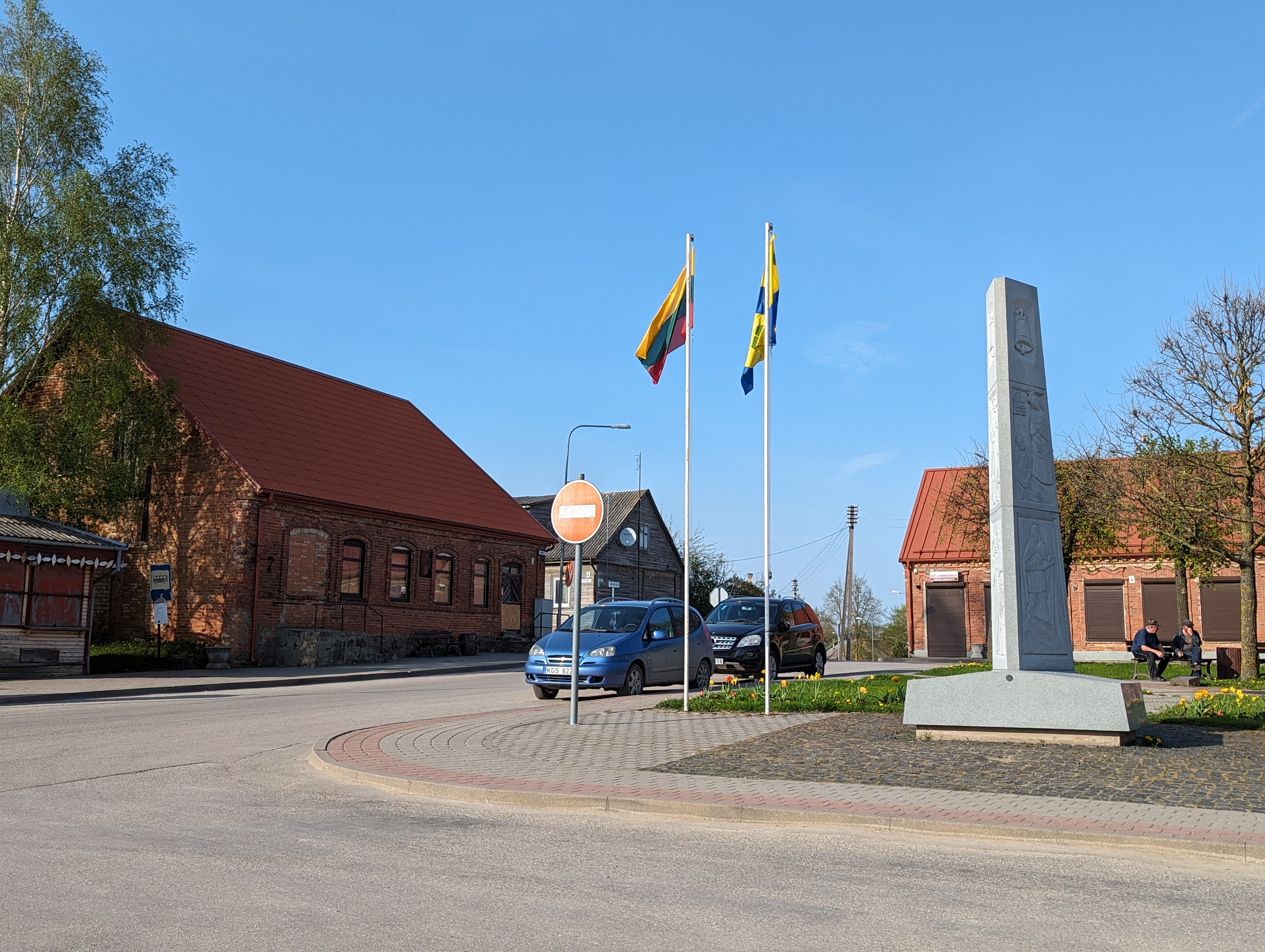
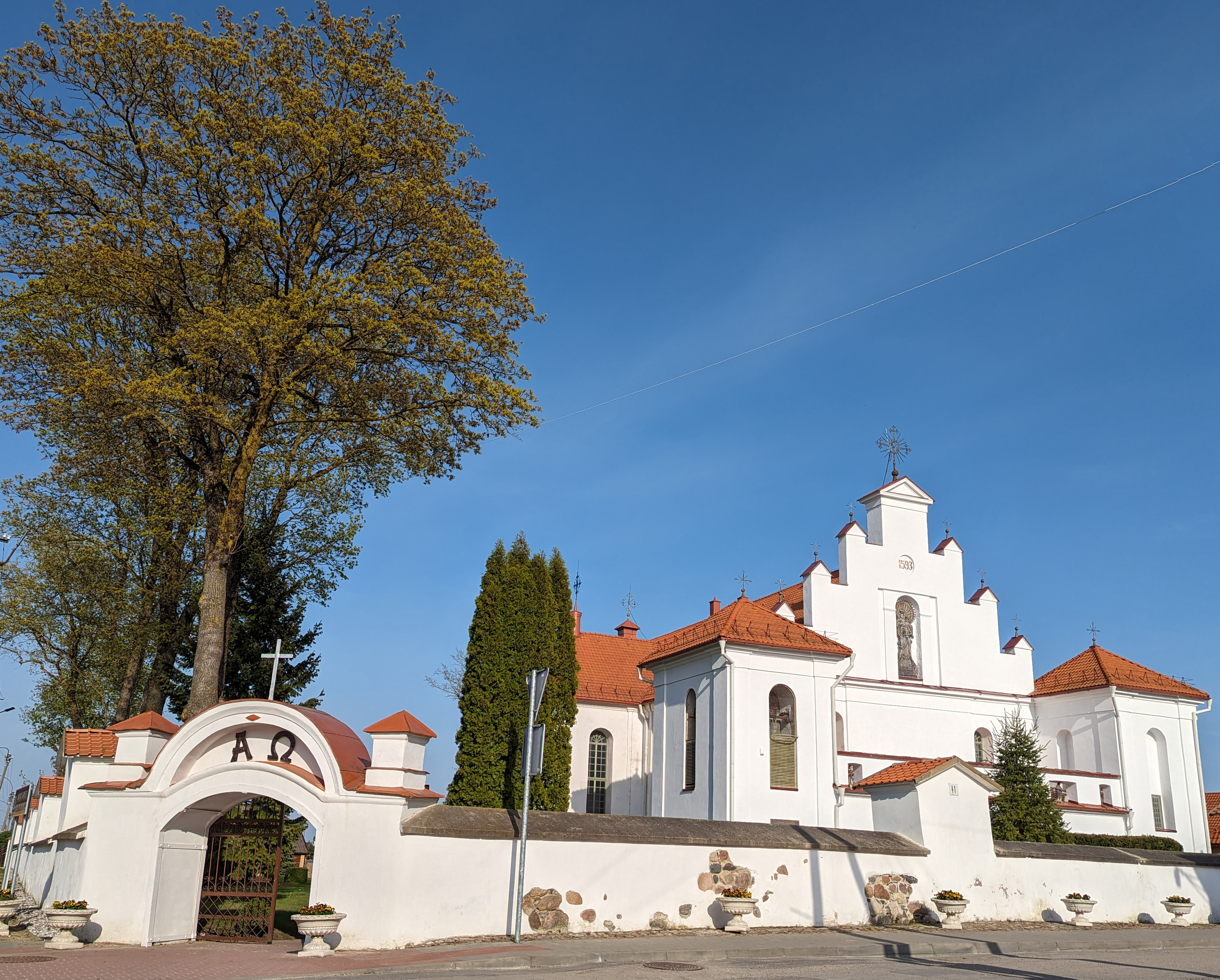
- Clockwise from top: Aerial view of the town; Unity Square; Linkuva Eldership Building; Carmelite Monastery and Church of the Virgin Mary Scapular; Gymnasium; Public decoration from flowers

- Flag Coat of arms

- Location of Linkuva
- Coordinates: 56°5′0″N 23°58′0″E
- Country: Lithuania
- Ethnographic region: Aukštaitija
- County: Šiauliai County
- Municipality: Pakruojis district municipality
- Eldership: Linkuva eldership
- Capital of: Linkuva eldership
- First mentioned: 1370
- Granted city rights: 1950

Population (2021)
  - Total: 1,275
- Time zone: UTC+2 (EET)
  - Summer (DST): UTC+3 (EEST)

Linkuva; is a town in the Pakruojis district municipality, Lithuania. It is located 18 km (11 mi) north-east of Pakruojis.The town is more than 500 years old. Linkuva is a state-protected urbanistic monument. It is one of the oldest towns of Lithuanian Semigalia. 7 streets are coming into the central square of Linkuva.

== History ==
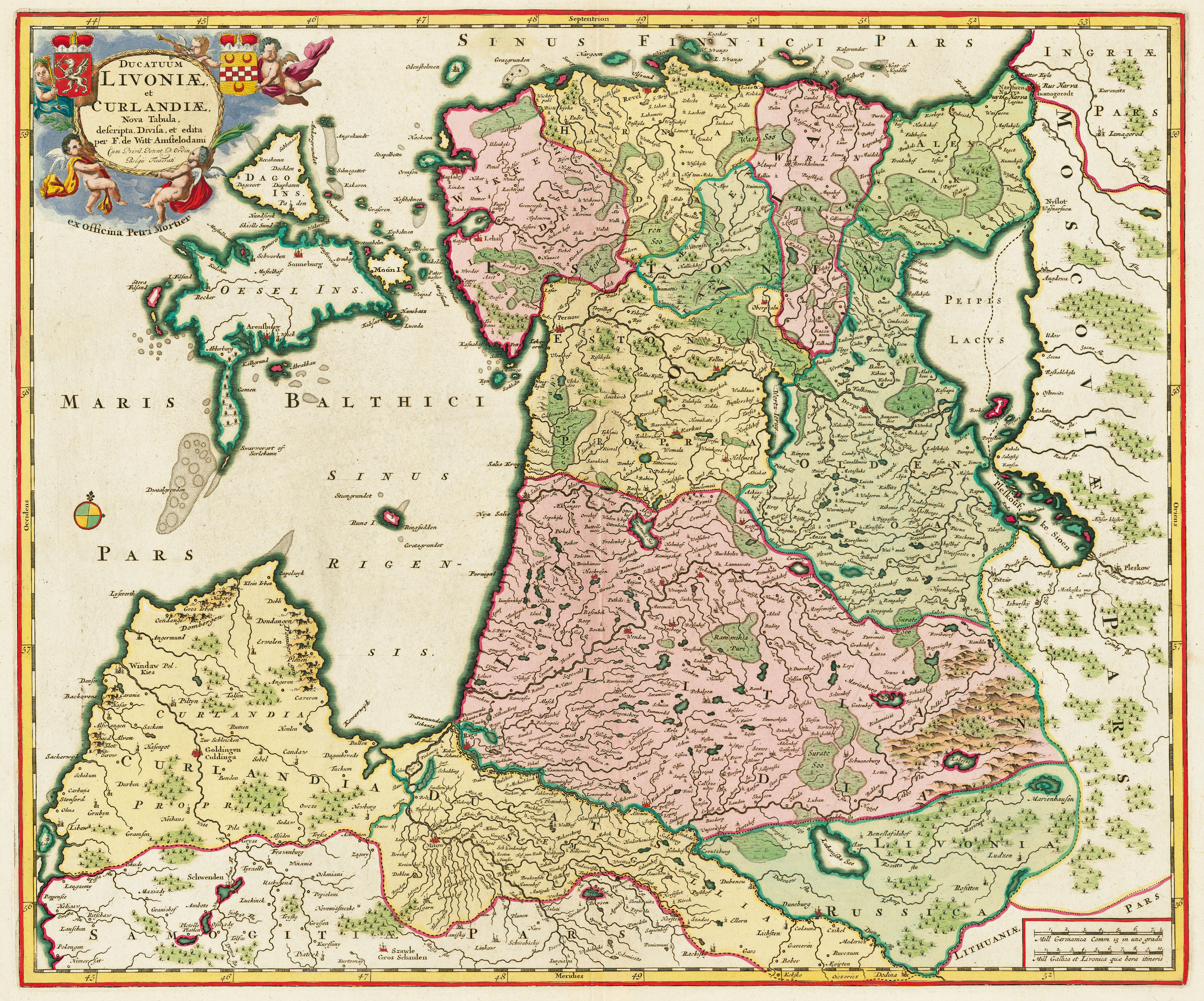
Linkuva (Linkow) depicted in the 1706 map of Livonia and Courland by Frederik de Wit-Pieter Mortier

The lands were inhabited by a Baltic tribe, the Semigallians. Linkuva was first mentioned in 1371 in Livonian chronicles by Hermann von Wartberge. Linkuva and its environs suffered from pillaging and attacks by the Livonian Order. The owner of Linkuva manor, Kotryna Mykolienė, built a church in 1500. Later it was taken over by Calvinists.

In documents from 1605, a continental Reformed church is mentioned. A parish school operated in the second part of the 16th century and in the beginning of the 19th century. In 1634, a Carmelite monastery was established; it closed in 1832.

In the spring of 1918, Linkuva hosted one of the first demonstrations for Lithuanian independence, supporting the Council of Lithuania. In 1919 the town was taken by Bermontians, but Linkuva volunteers helped to regain it for Lithuania. In 1923, the gymnasium of Linkuva was established, which became well known in northern Lithuania. In 1937, a town library was established.

In 1940, after the occupation of Lithuania by the USSR, all the town's factories and stores were nationalized and deportations started. On June 23, 1941, after Nazi German invasion and the Soviet withdrawal from Lithuania, hundreds of Jews escaping eastward from Šiauliai and the neighboring towns found refuge in Linkuva and remained there. Most of the town's Jews were forcibly held in stables and warehouses, where they were brutally attacked. In the summer of 1941, 200 Jewish men were killed near the village of Dvariūkai. The victims came from Linkuva, along with Jewish refugees who had fled to the village.

Soviet occupants in 1940–41 and in 1944–53 deported 30 people from Linkuva. After the World War II the Soviet Army stationed 150 soldiers in Linkuva to fight Lithuanian partisans. After the Soviet occupation, around Linkuva Lithuanian partisans of Prisikėlimas military district were active.

=== Notable people ===
- Vladas Garastas (g. 1932), basketball coach
- Stasys Tumėnas (g. 1958), linguist, publisher
- Zinas Kazėnas (g. 1936), journalist, photographer
