= Šiauliai County =

County of Lithuania

Coordinates: 55°55′55″N 23°18′51″E

Šiauliai County Šiaulių apskritis
- County
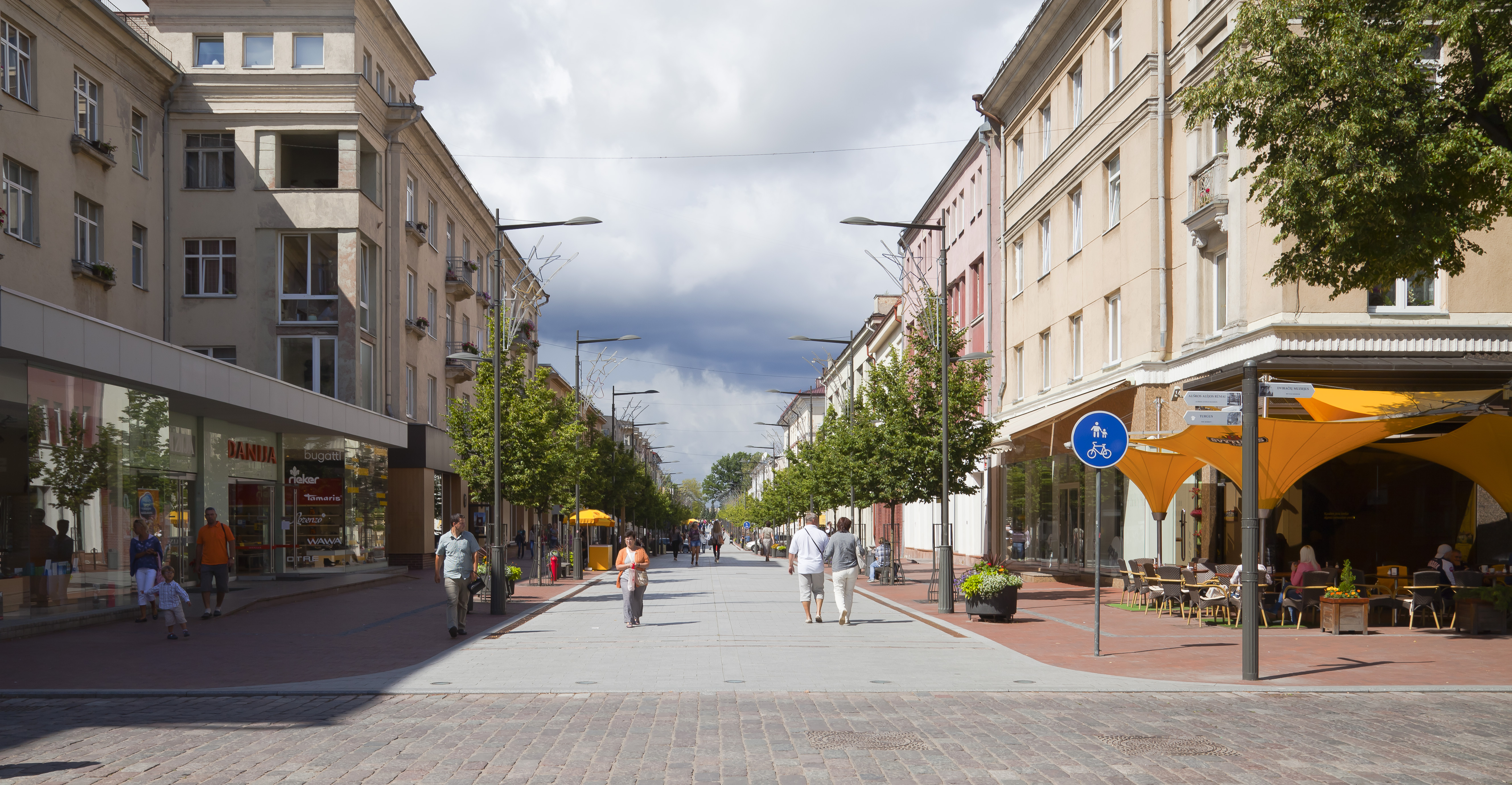
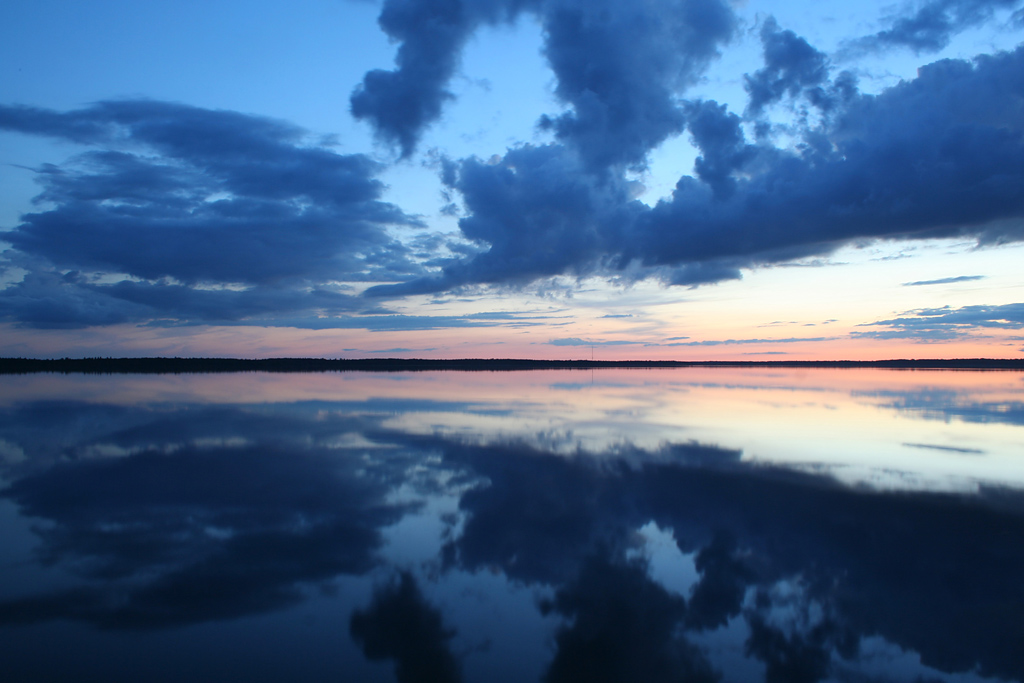
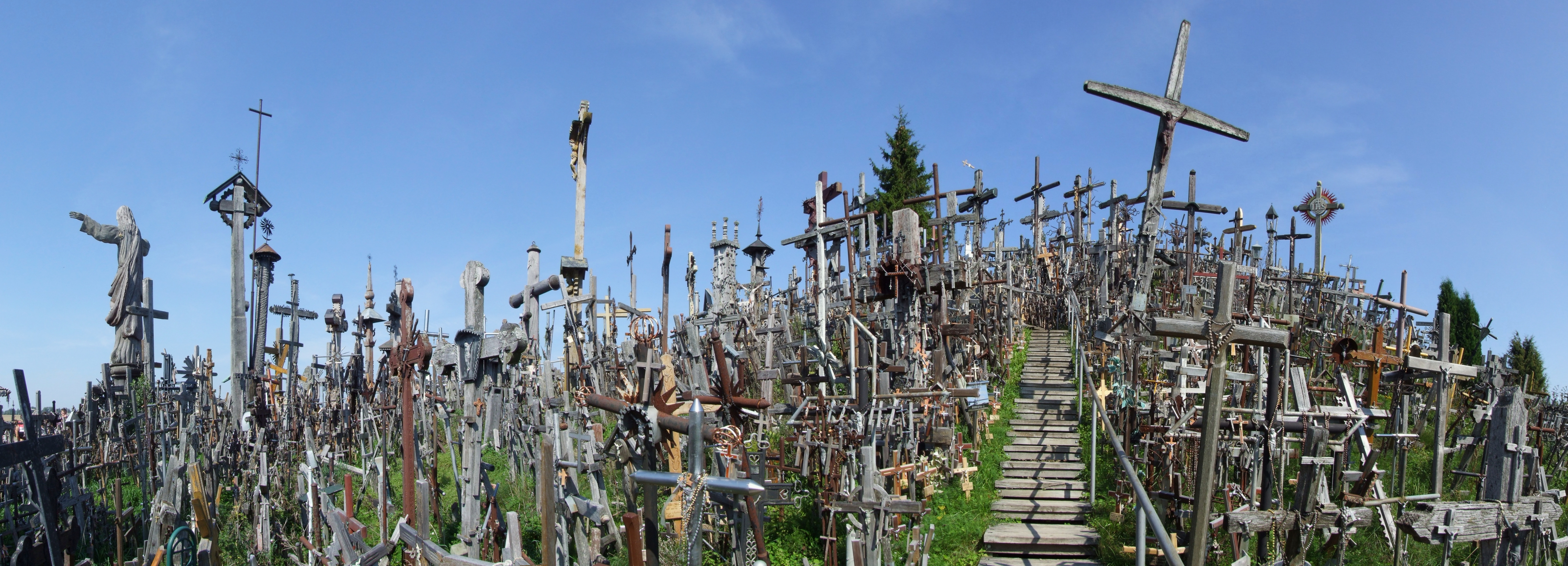
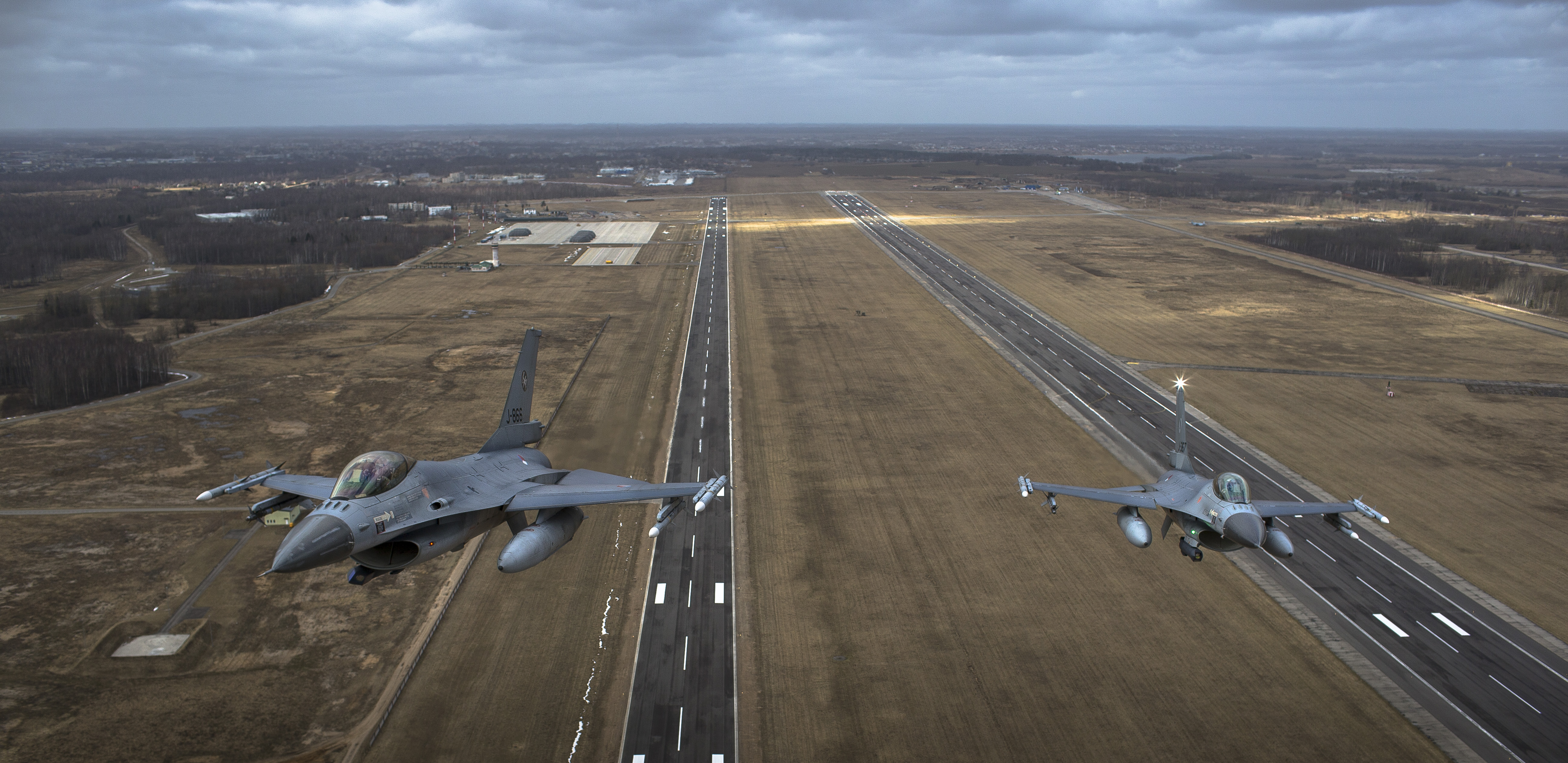
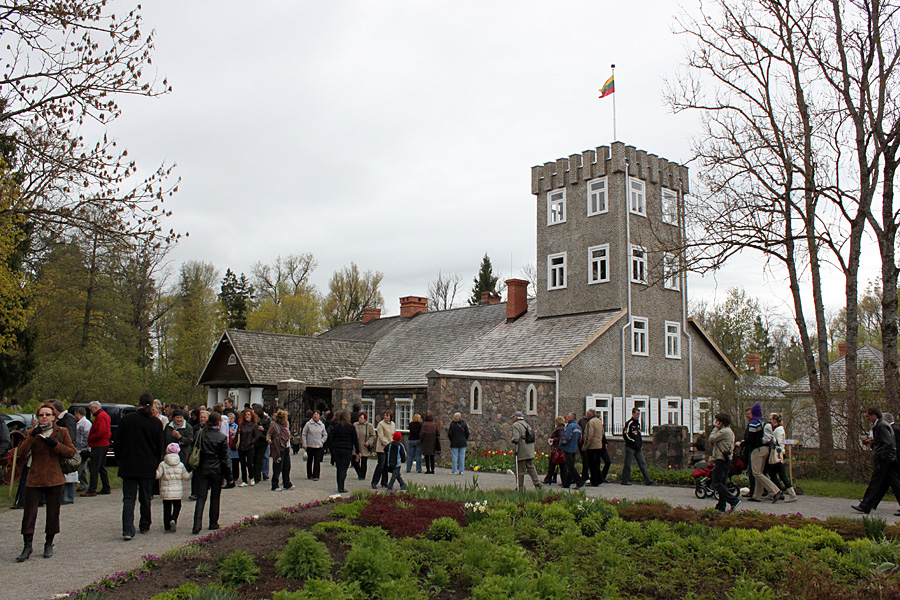
- From the top to bottom-right: Vilnius street in Šiauliai, Lake Rėkyva, Hill of Crosses, Šiauliai International Airport, Burbiškis Manor

- Flag Coat of arms

- Location of Šiauliai County
- Country: Lithuania
- Administrative centre: Šiauliai
- Municipalities: List: Akmenė district municipality; Joniškis district municipality; Kelmė district municipality; Pakruojis district municipality; Radviliškis district municipality; Šiauliai city municipality; Šiauliai district municipality

Area
  - Total: 8,537 km^{2} (3,296 sq mi)
- (13.1% of the area of Lithuania)

Population (2020-01-01)
  - Total: 261,452
  - Rank: 4th of 10 (10.4% of the population of Lithuania)
  - Density: 30.63/km^{2} (79.32/sq mi)

GDP
  - Total: €4.8 billion (2023) · 4th
- Time zone: UTC+2 (EET)
  - Summer (DST): UTC+3 (EEST)
- ISO 3166 code: LT-SA
- HDI (2022): 0.852 very high · 4th

Šiauliai County (Lithuanian: Šiaulių apskritis) is one of ten counties in Lithuania. It is in the north of the country, and its capital is Šiauliai. On 1 July 2010, the county administration was abolished, and since that date, Šiauliai County remains as a territorial and statistical unit. It borders Latvia.

== History ==
Formation of administrative regions in Lithuania started in the Grand Duchy of Lithuania in the Middle Ages, with the bulk of the territory of the current Šiauliai County forming part of the Duchy of Samogitia, itself divided into tracts.

In October 1795, Catherine II of Russia granted Šiauliai the city rights and the privilege to become the capital town of the region. Administrative division of Russian Empire remained unchanged up to the end of World War I. When the war came to its end, in 1918 Lithuania was restored as an independent state.

On December 17, 1918, a circular No.1 was issued "On Municipalities in Lithuania" that declared that the entire area of Lithuania would be divided into the regions - apskritys (county sometimes translated into English as a provinces or counties). There were ten apskritys in Lithuania.

In 1937, Siauliai county's overall territory was 6042 km^{2} and 210 thousands people lived there. It was the largest apskritis in Lithuania.

In 1940, the Soviet Union occupied Lithuania and reformed the administrative system. The county system remained until 1950 when the counties were abolished and entire area was divided into smaller units - districts, or rajonas in Lithuanian.

Only in 1994 - four years after the restoration of Lithuania's independence in 1990 - the apskritys were created again. However, the interwar apskritys should not be mixed with current apskritys, as their purpose, sizes, and number are all different, see administrative division of Lithuania. The entire area of Lithuania is currently divided into ten larger units - apskritys and smaller districts, consisting of urban and rural elderships.

== Municipalities ==
The County encompasses municipalities of:

Akmenė District Municipality
Joniškis District Municipality
Kelmė District Municipality
Pakruojis District Municipality
Radviliškis District Municipality
Šiauliai City Municipality
Šiauliai District Municipality

== Cities ==
1. Šiauliai
2. Radviliškis
3. Kuršėnai
4. Joniškis
5. Naujoji Akmenė
6. Kelmė
7. Pakruojis
8. Šeduva
9. Akmenė
10. Venta
11. Tytuvėnai
12. Žagarė
13. Linkuva
14. Užventis

== Gallery ==
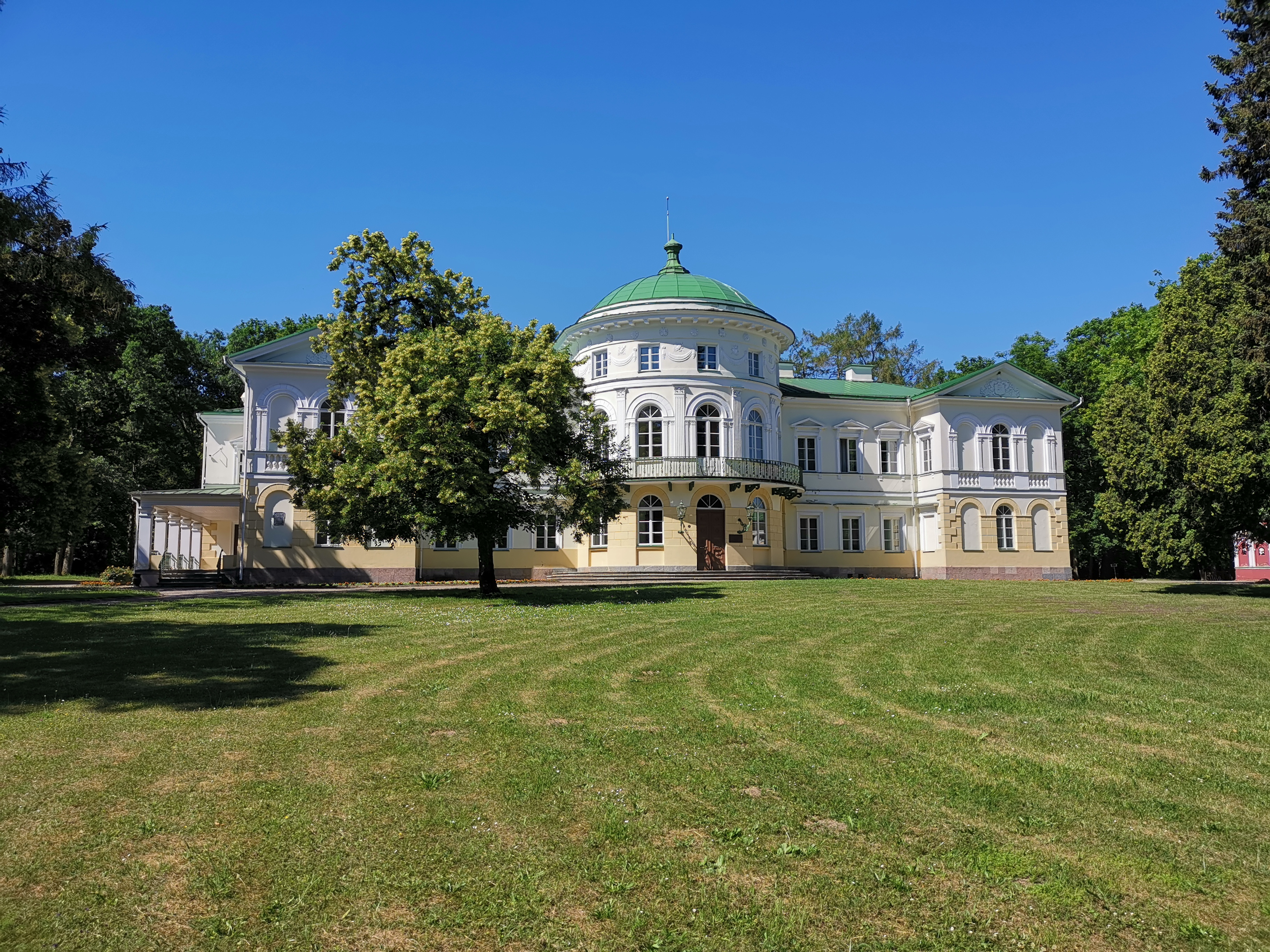
Baisogala Manor

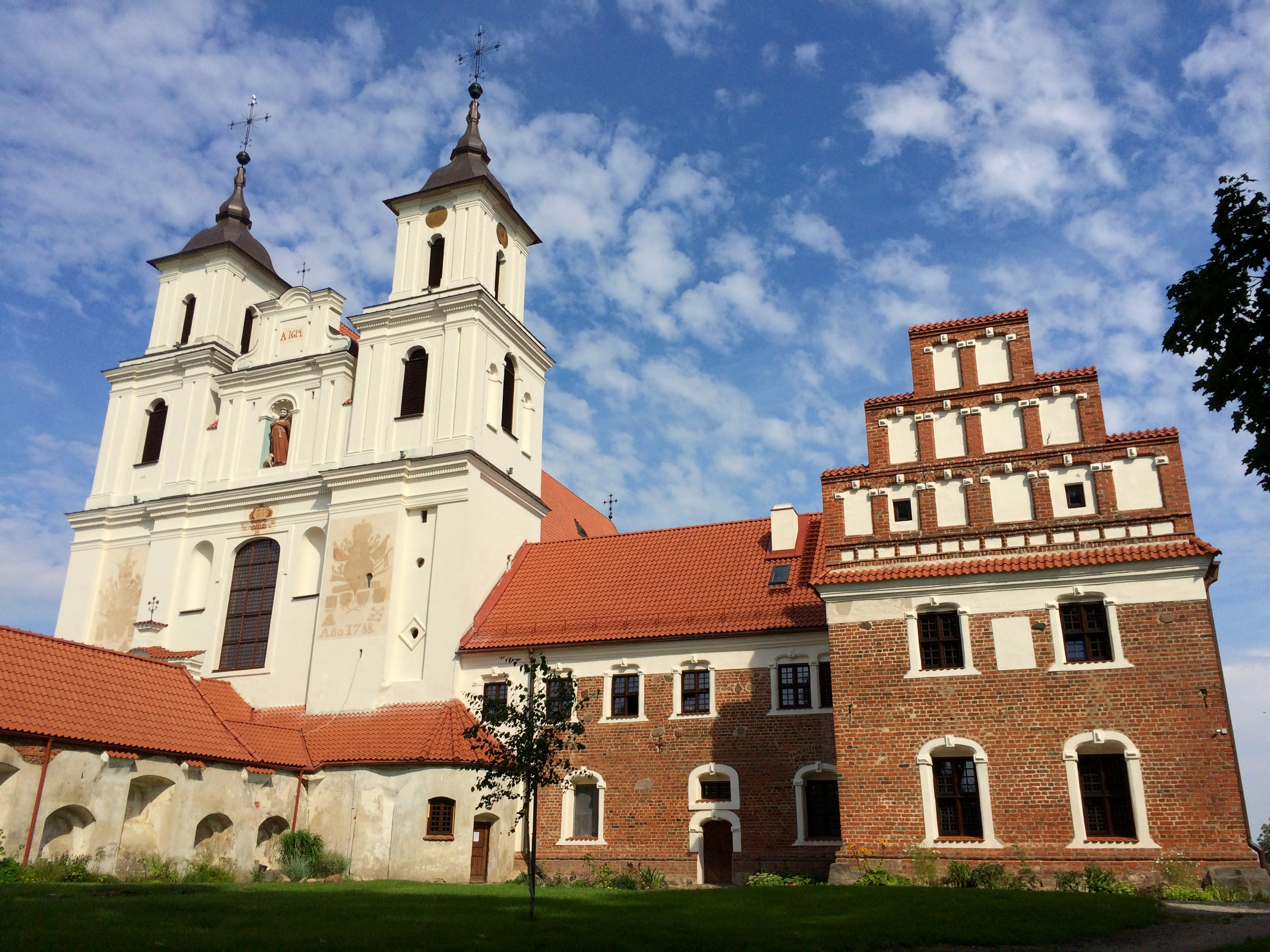
Tytuvėnai Monastery

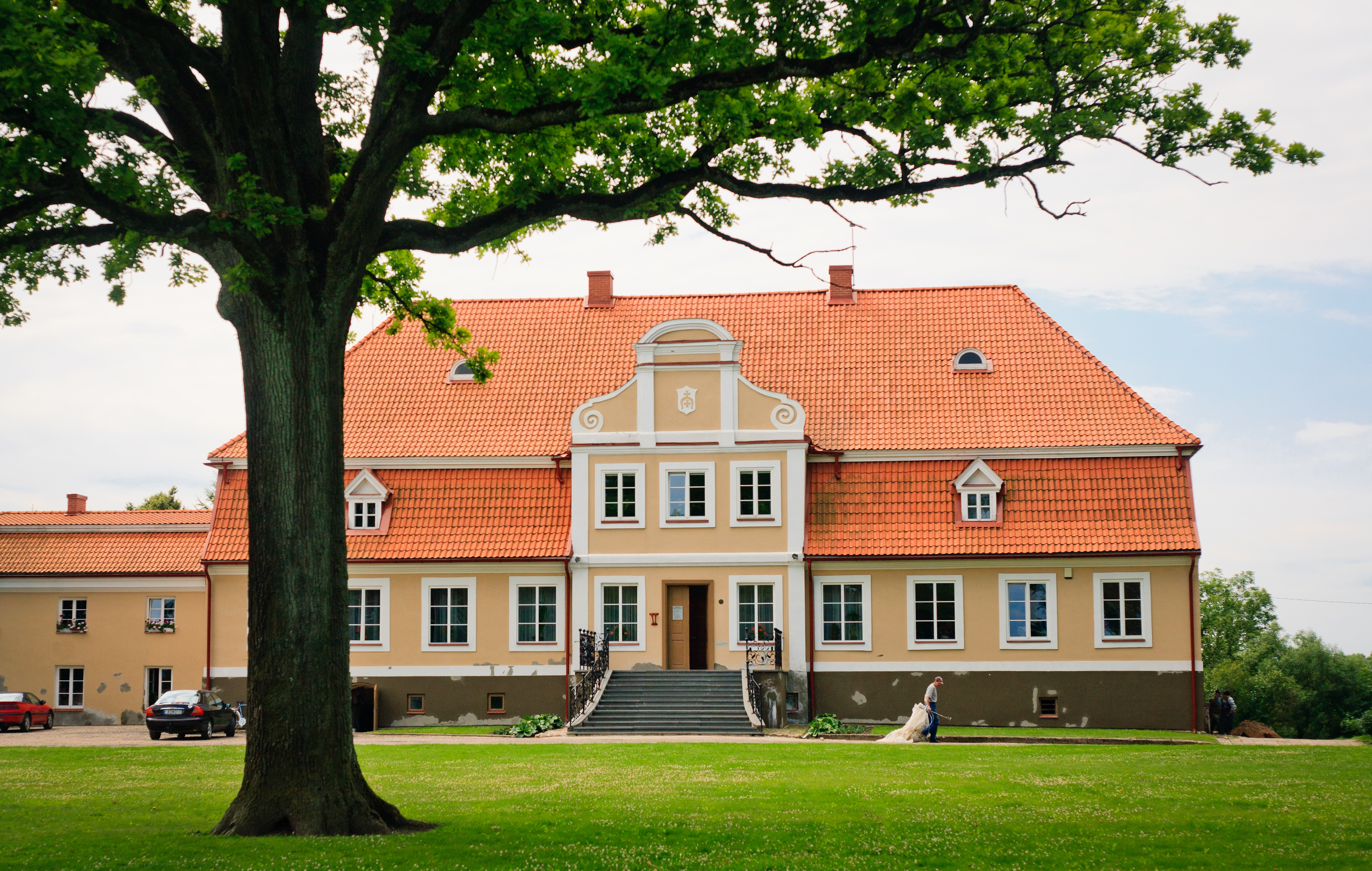
Kelmė Manor

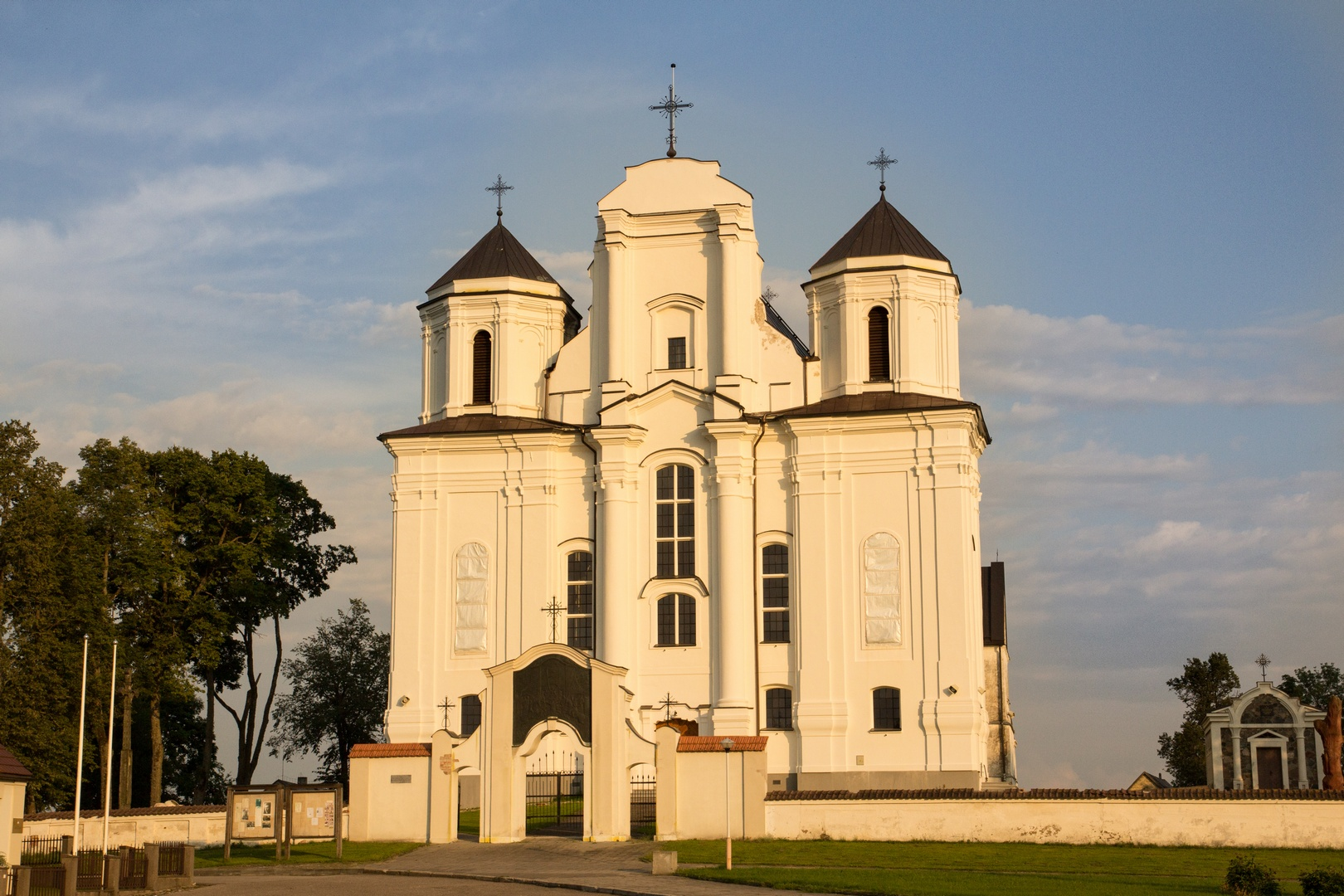
Church of the Immaculate Conception in Kražiai

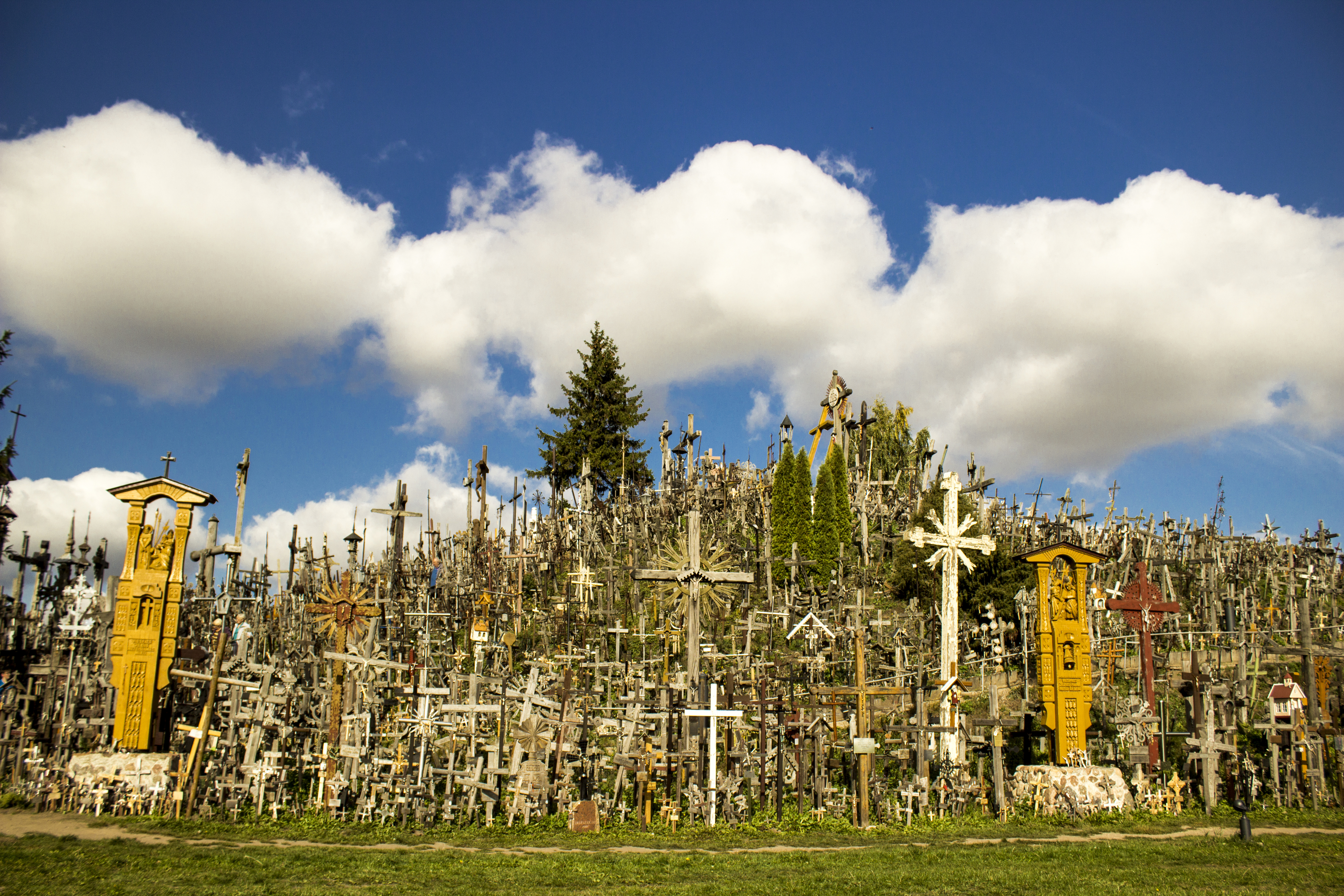
Hill of Crosses
