= Kelmė =

Town in Samogitia Region, Lithuania

- City
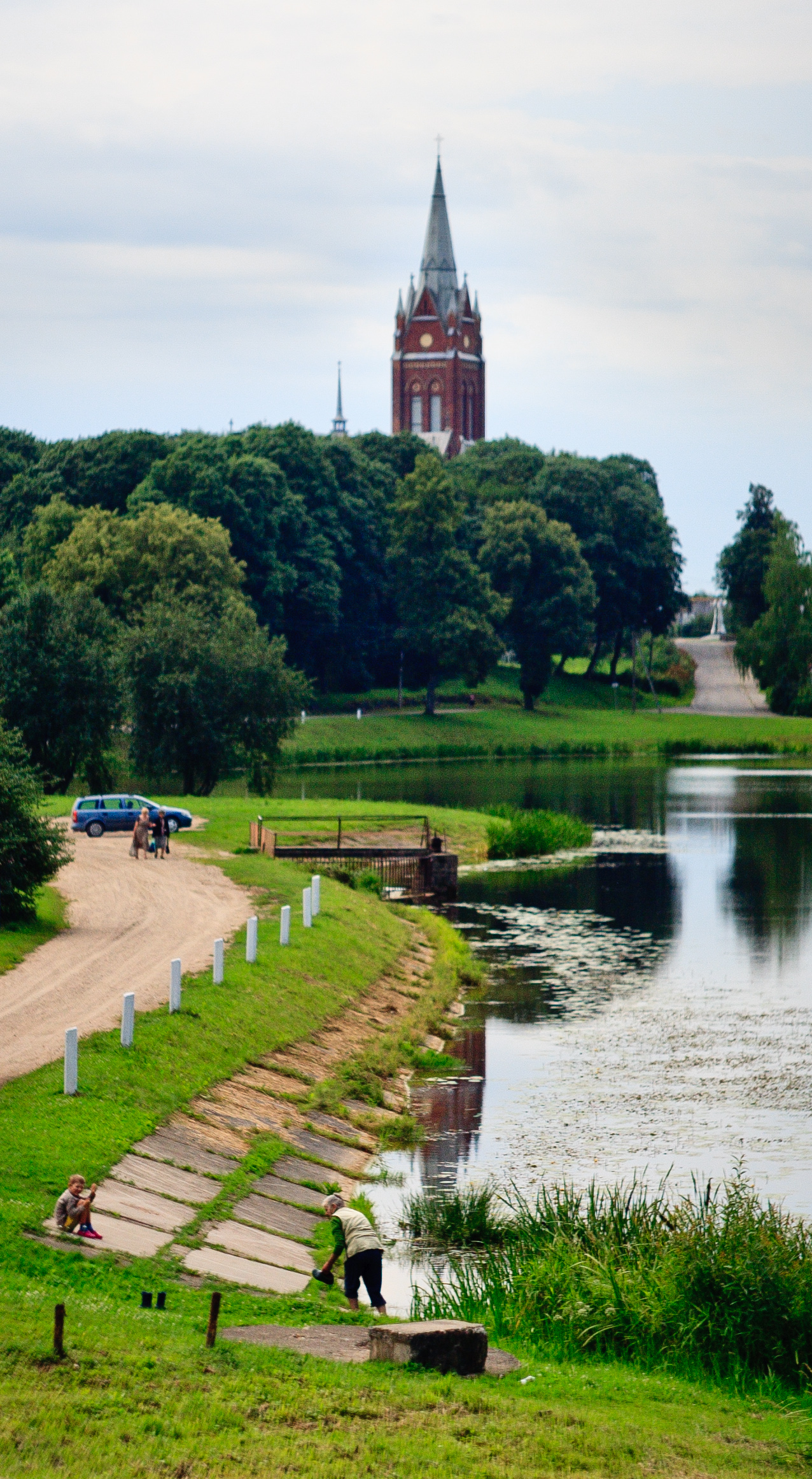
- Church of Kelmė

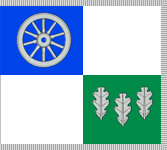
- Flag Coat of arms

- Location of Kelmė
- Coordinates: 55°38′0″N 22°56′0″E
- Country: Lithuania
- Ethnographic region: Samogitia
- County: Šiauliai County
- Municipality: Kelmė district municipality
- Eldership: Kelmė eldership
- Capital of: Kelmė district municipality Kelmė eldership
- First mentioned: 1484
- Granted city rights: 1947

Government
  - Mayor: Vaclovas Andrulis

Area
  - Total: 7.85 km^{2} (3.03 sq mi)
- Elevation: 128 m (420 ft)

Population (2021)
  - Total: 7,544
  - Density: 961/km^{2} (2,490/sq mi)
- Time zone: UTC+2 (EET)
  - Summer (DST): UTC+3 (EEST)
- Website: kelme.lt

Kelmė (Polish: Kielmy; Yiddish: קעלם, romanized: Kelm) is a city in northwestern Lithuania, a historical region of Samogitia. It has a population of 8,206 and is the administrative center of the Kelmė District Municipality.

== Name ==
Kelmė's name is likely derived from the Lithuanian word kelmynės, literally: the stubby place, because of the forests that were there at the time of its founding. The Yiddish name is Kelm, as in Kelm Talmud Torah.

== History ==
Kelmė was first mentioned in 1416, the year that Kelmė's first church was built. It was located in the Duchy of Samogitia in the Grand Duchy of Lithuania within the Polish–Lithuanian Commonwealth.

Prior to World War II, Kelmė (Yiddish: Kelm) was home to a famous Rabbinical College, the Kelm Talmud Torah. According to an 1897 census, 2,710 of Kelme's 3,914 inhabitants were members of the town's Jewish population, the vast majority of whom were merchants and traders and lived in the town. Most of the Jews in Kelmė rural district were murdered during a mass execution on 29 July 1941. On August 22 a second mass execution occurred. On 2 October 1941, some Kelmė and Vaiguva Jews were murdered in Žagarė. The executions were committed by the Germans soldiers, auxiliary police and Lithuanian collaborators. In total, the number of victims is 1,250-1,300 people.

== Gallery ==
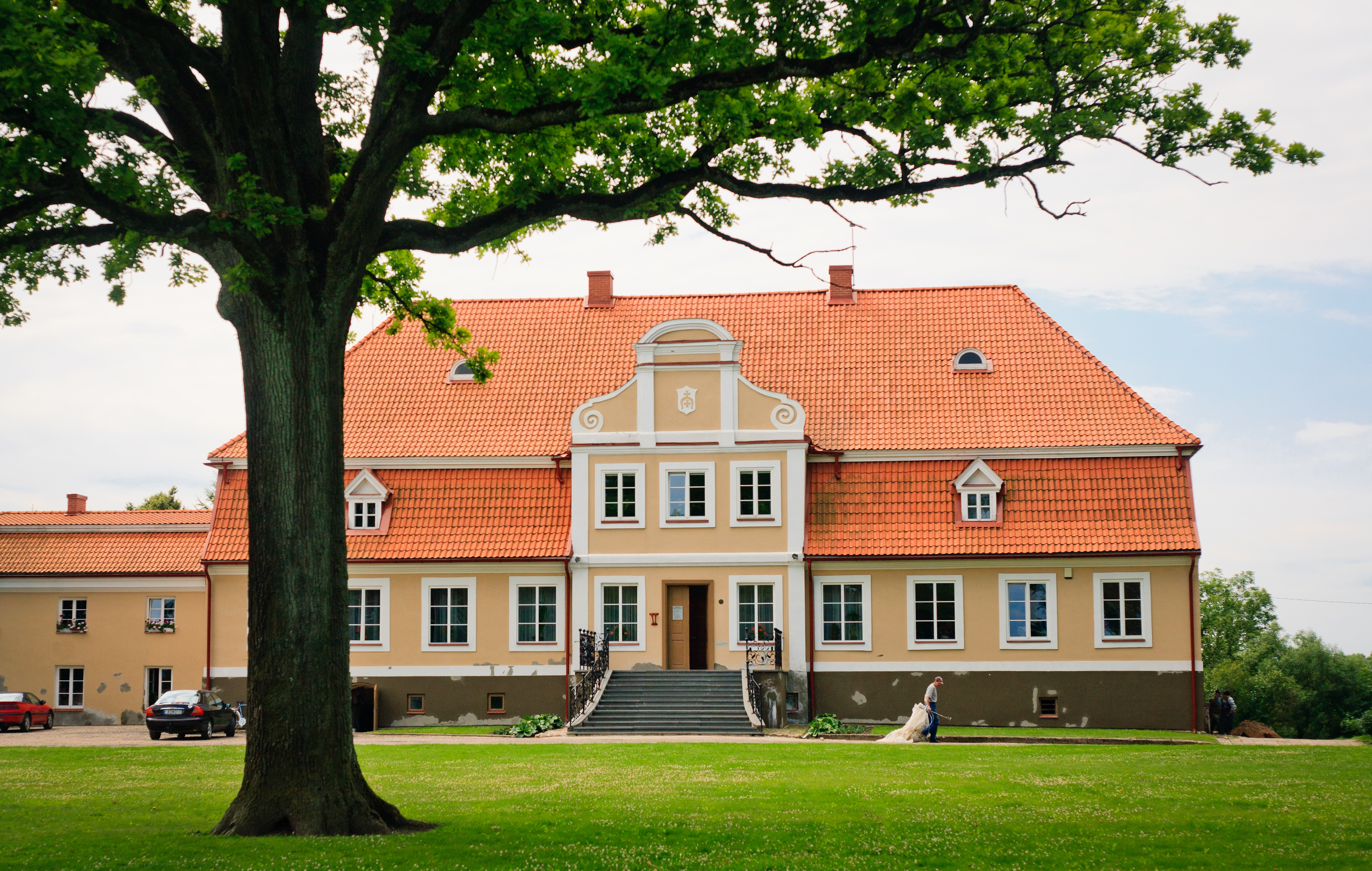
Kelmė Manor, dates to the 15th century

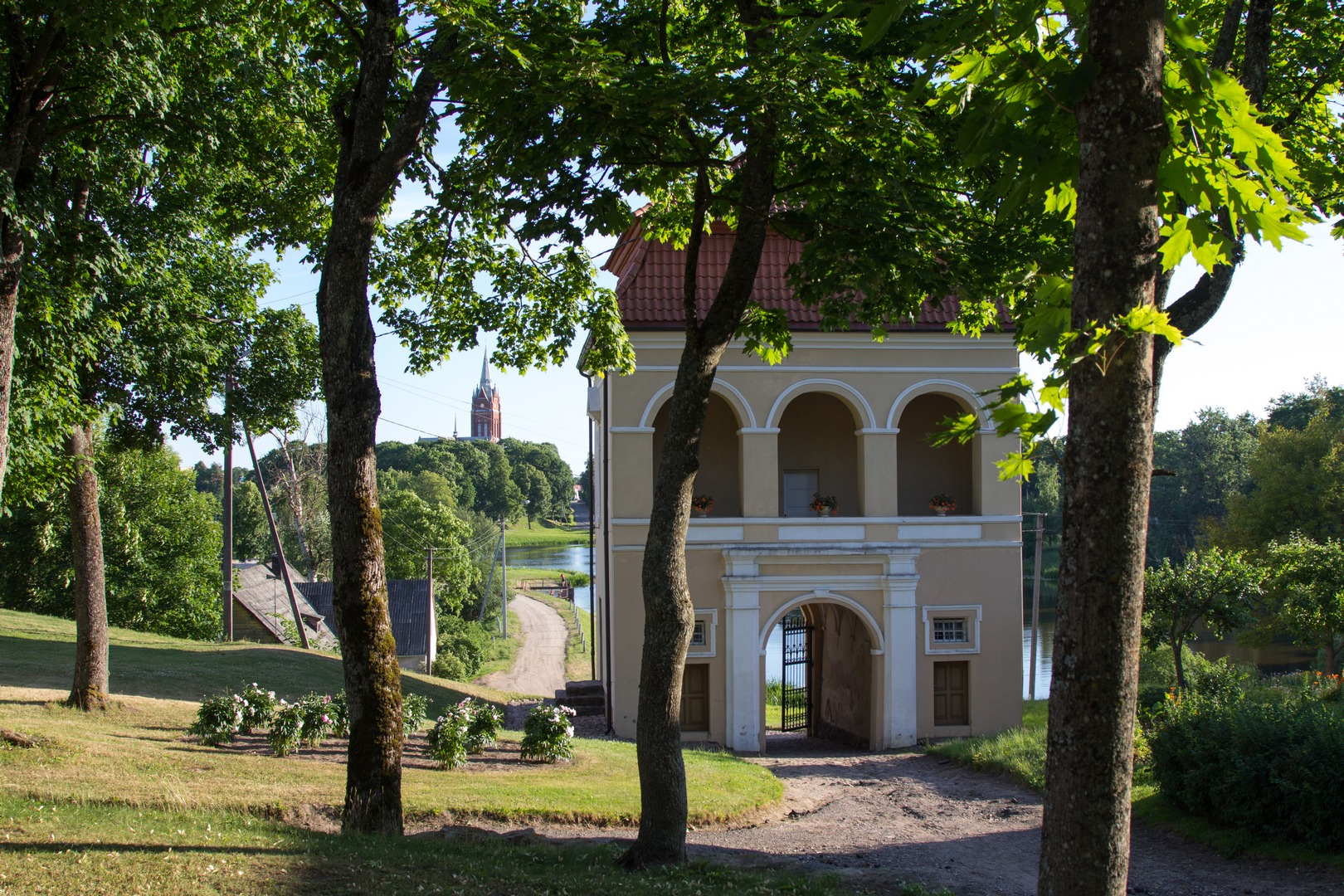
Kelmė Manor gates and church in the distance

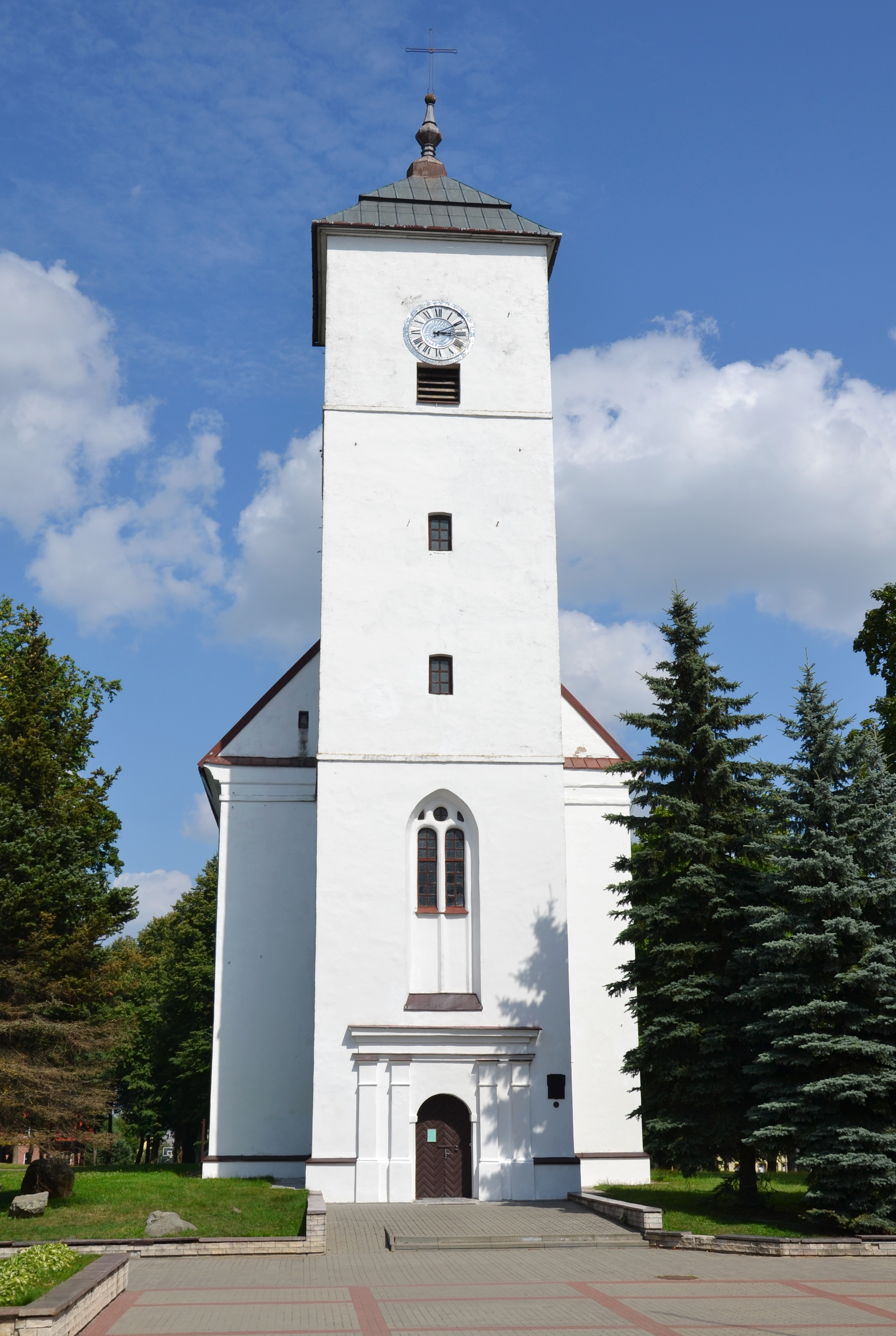
Evangelical Reformed Church, built in 1615

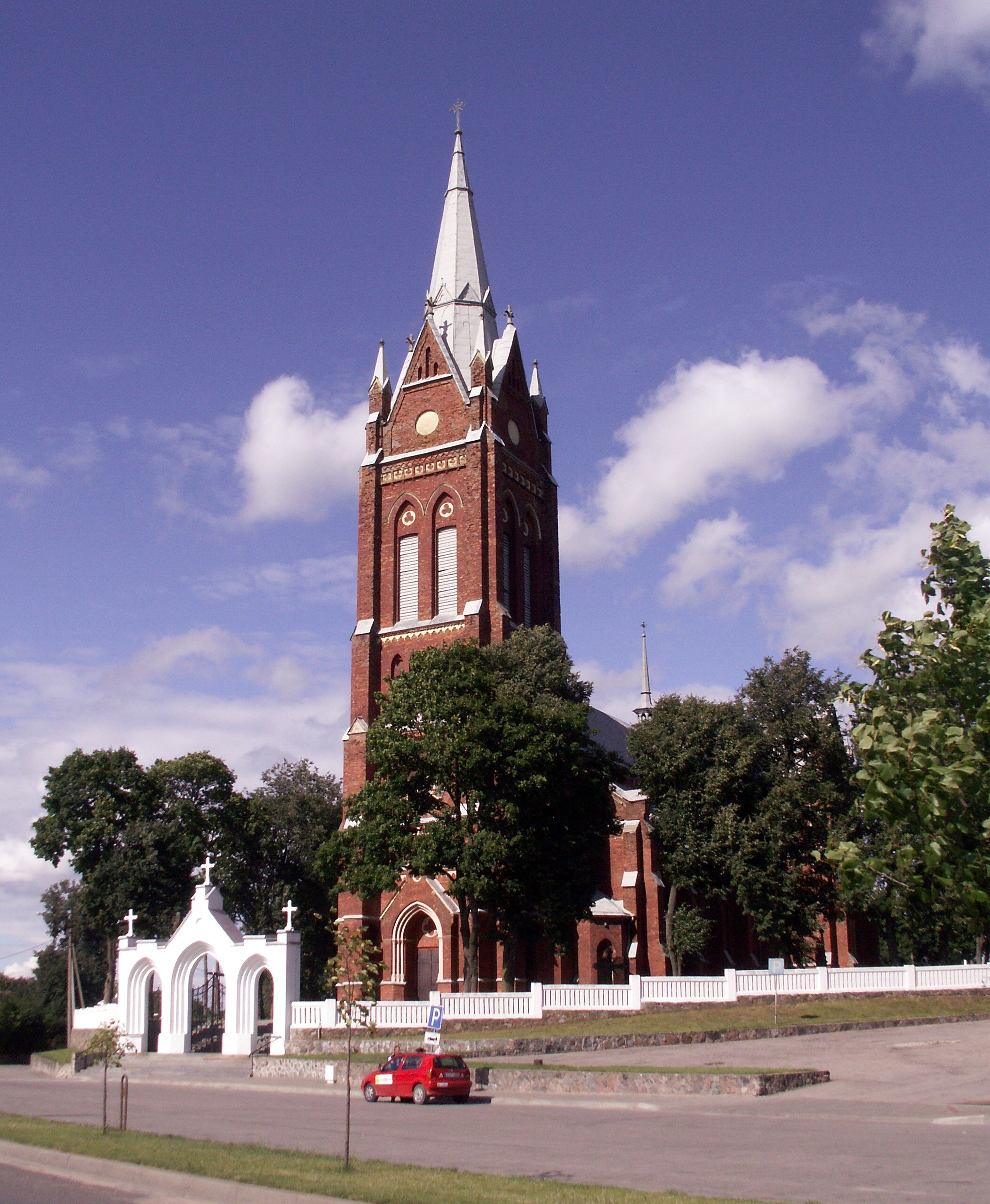
Roman Catholic Church

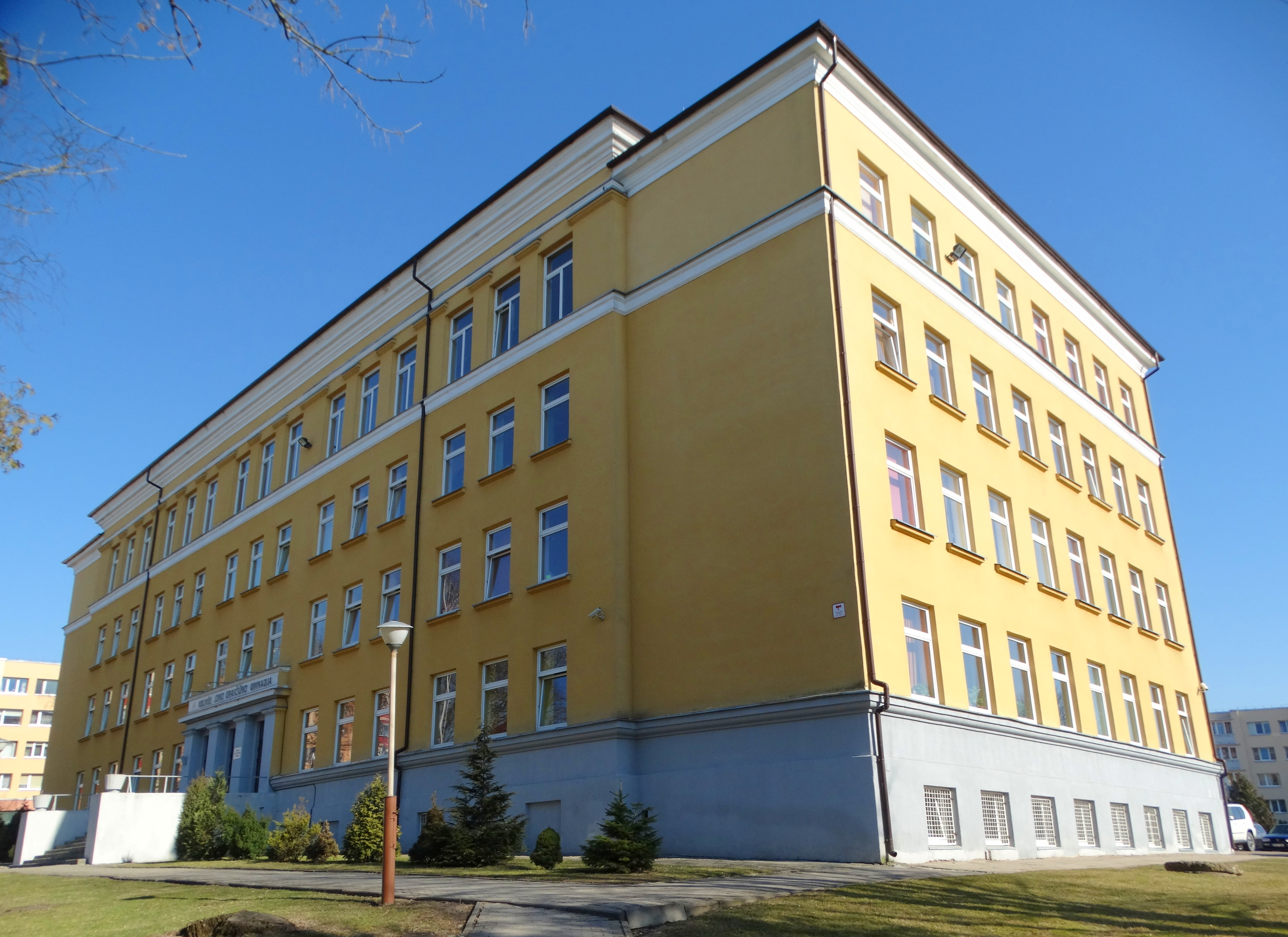
Kelmė Jonas Graičiūnas Gymnasium

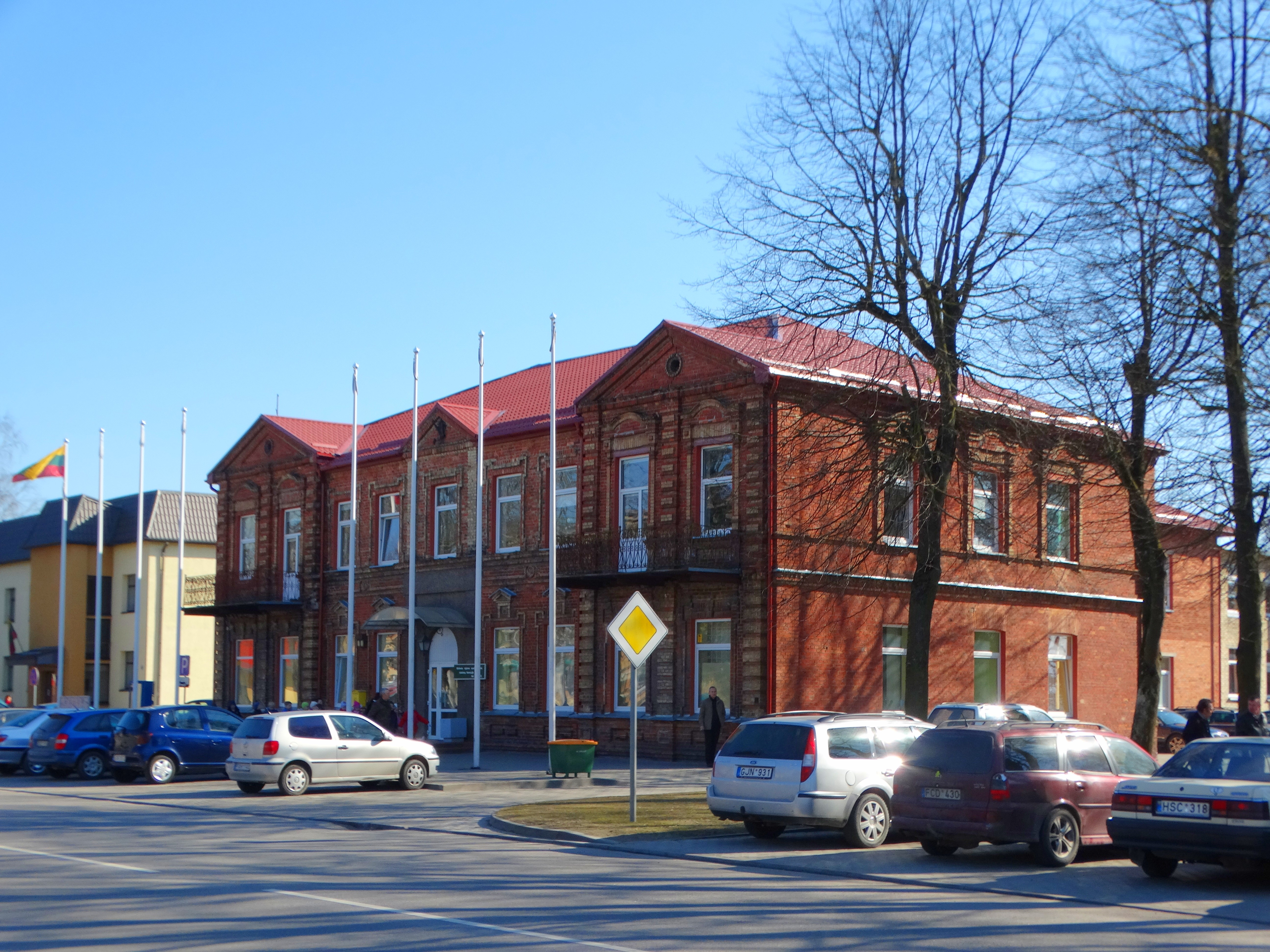
Municipality building

== People ==
- Aryeh Leib Frumkin (1845–1916), Rabbi
- Bronius Laucevičius-Vargšas (1884–1916), writer
- Antanas Mackevičius (1828–1863), Roman Catholic priest involved in Uprising of 1863
- Icchokas Meras (1934–2014), writer
- Zvi Yaakov Oppenheim (1883–1926), Rabbi
- Simcha Zissel Ziv (1824–1898), the Alter of Kelm
