= Pakruojis District Municipality =

Coordinates: 56°02′31″N 23°53′42″E

Pakruojis District Municipality Pakruojo rajono savivaldybė
- Municipality
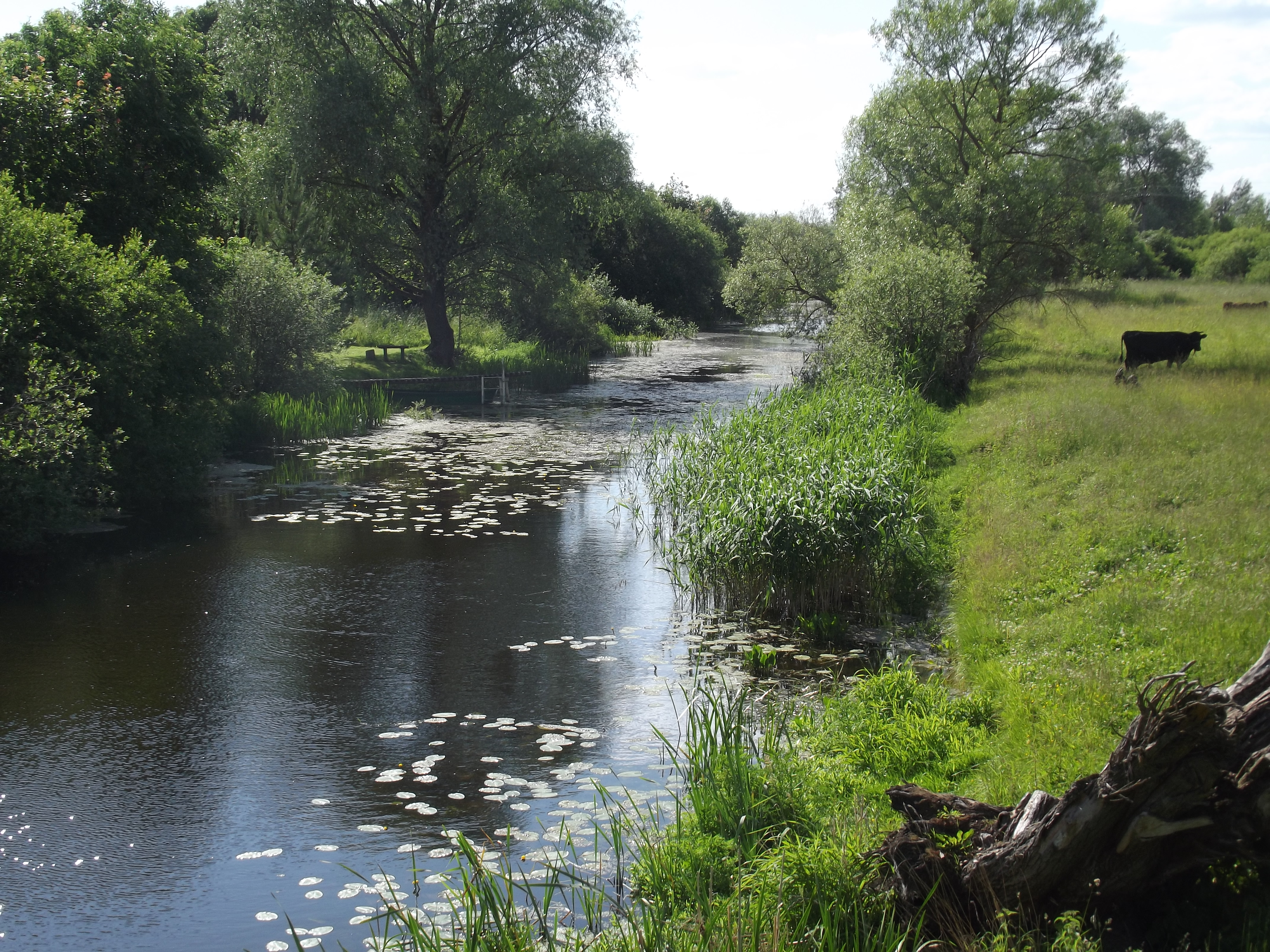
- Beržtalis River near Žeimelis

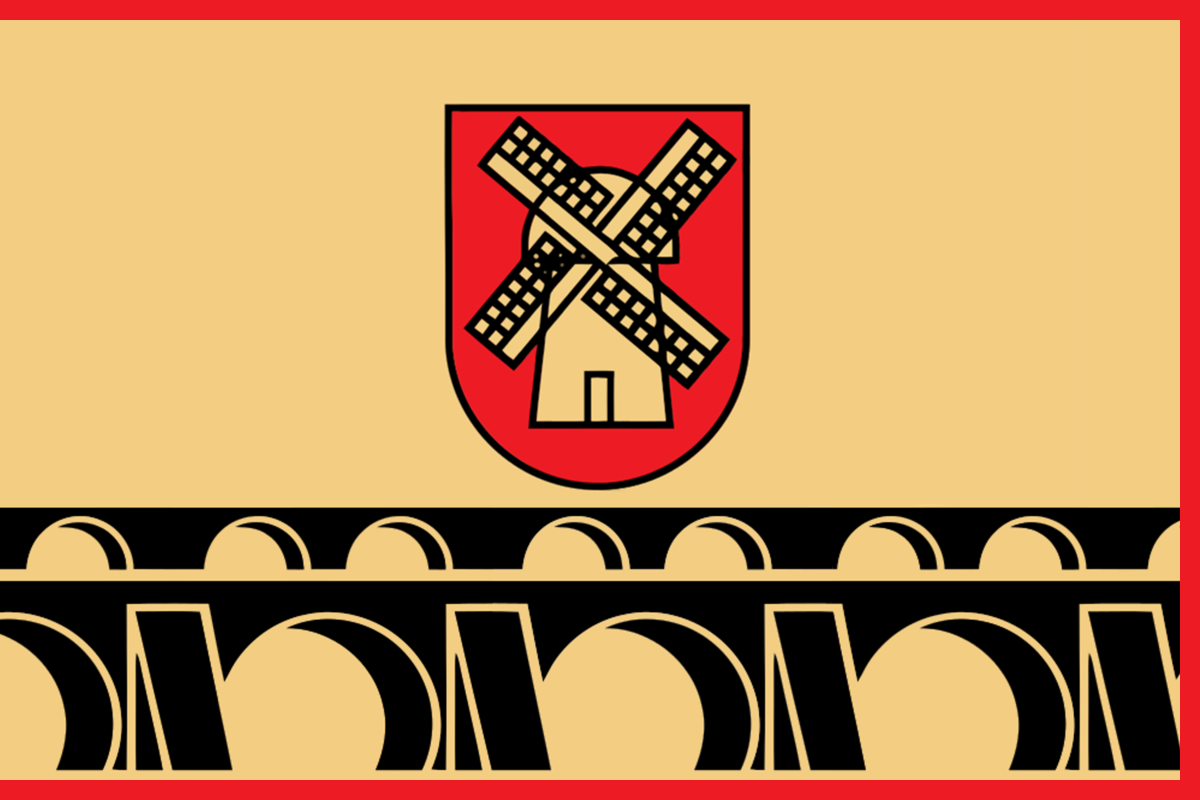
- Flag Coat of arms

- Location of Pakruojis district municipality within Lithuania

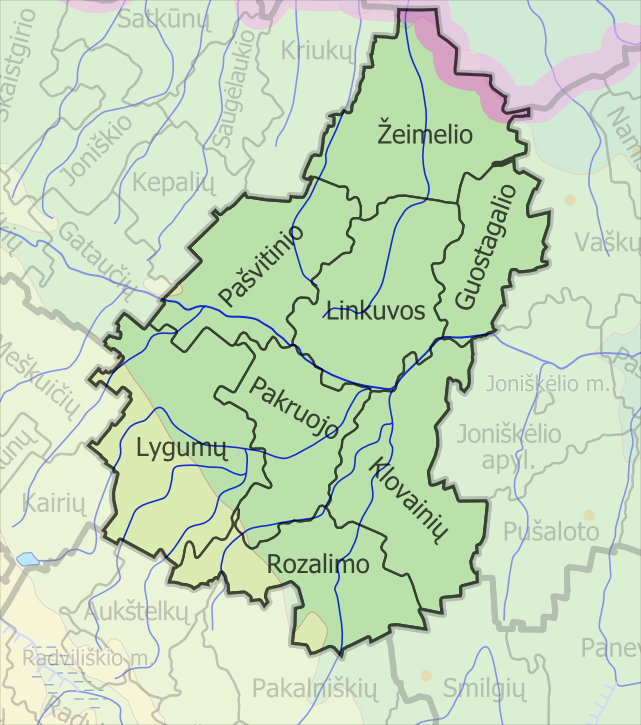
- Map of Pakruojis district municipality
- Country: Lithuania
- Ethnographic region: Aukštaitija
- County: Šiauliai County
- Capital: Pakruojis
- Elderships: 8

Area
  - Total: 1,316 km^{2} (508 sq mi)
  - Rank: 25th

Population (2021)
  - Total: 18,827
  - Rank: 44th
  - Density: 14.31/km^{2} (37.05/sq mi)
  - Rank: 50th
- Time zone: UTC+2 (EET)
  - Summer (DST): UTC+3 (EEST)
- Telephone code: 421
- Major settlements: Pakruojis (pop. 4,352); Linkuva (pop. 1,275)
- Website: www.pakruojis.lt

Pakruojis District Municipality is one of 60 municipalities in Lithuania. It is an agricultural district, situated in the north of Lithuania and bordering with Latvia. The rivers Kruoja, Mūša and others flow through the district. Forests occupy 16.7% of the territory of the Pakruojis district. It is close to two major cities: Šiauliai is 40 kilometres (25 mi) to the west, and Panevėžys - about 50 kilometres (31 mi) to the southeast.

Pakruojis is known as one of the main centres of traditional Lithuanian brewing, along with Pasvalys and Biržai. The founder of the Lithuanian beer website alutis.lt reports that there are 19 breweries in the Pakruojis district. Most bars in town feature local types of beer. The main park in Pakruojis features a collection of local folk-art wood carvings.
