= Kelmė District Municipality =

Coordinates: 55°40′26″N 22°51′04″E

Kelmė District Municipality Kelmės rajono savivaldybė
- Municipality
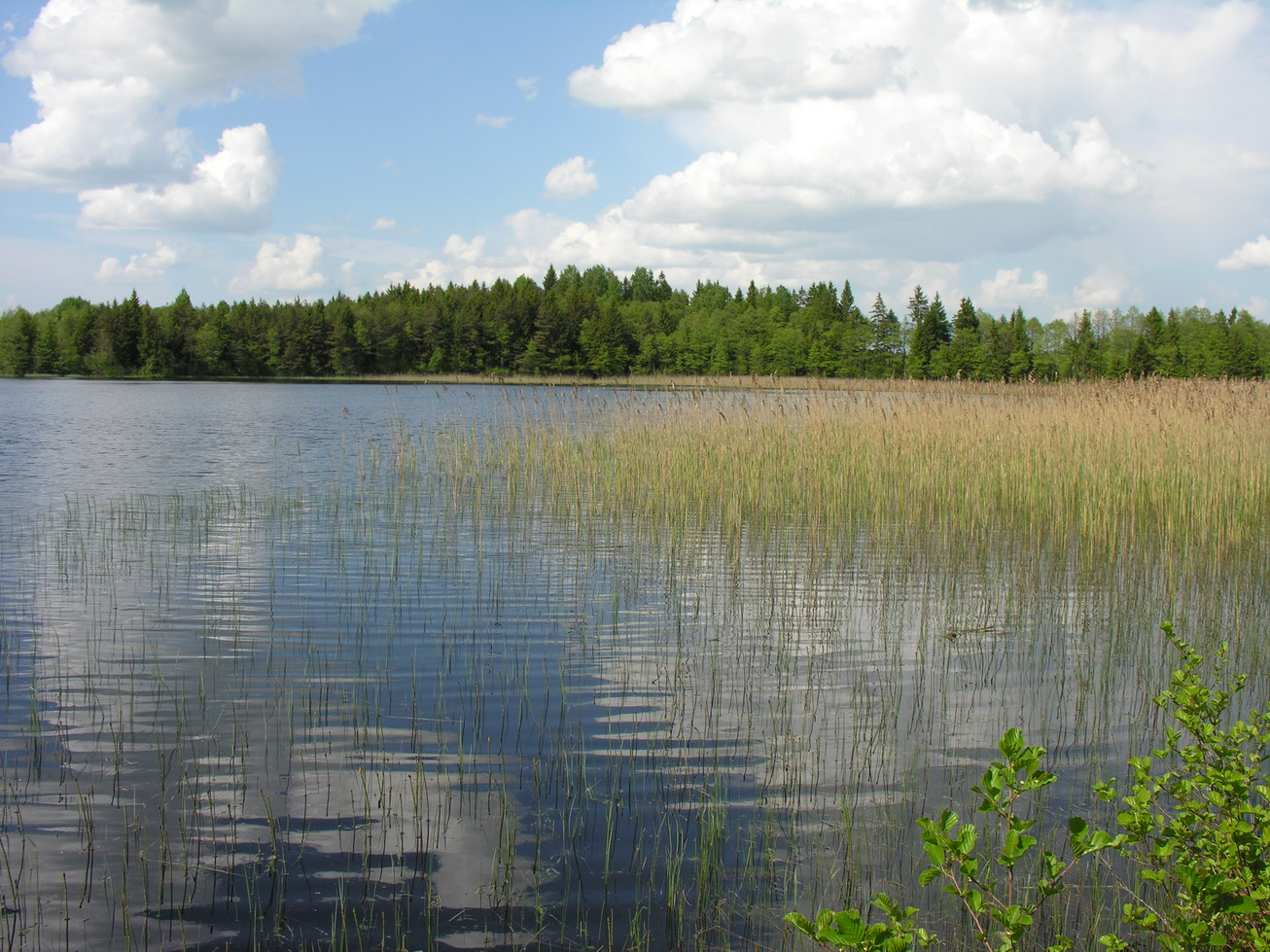
- Žiaunė lake

- Coat of arms

- Location of Kelmė district municipality within Lithuania

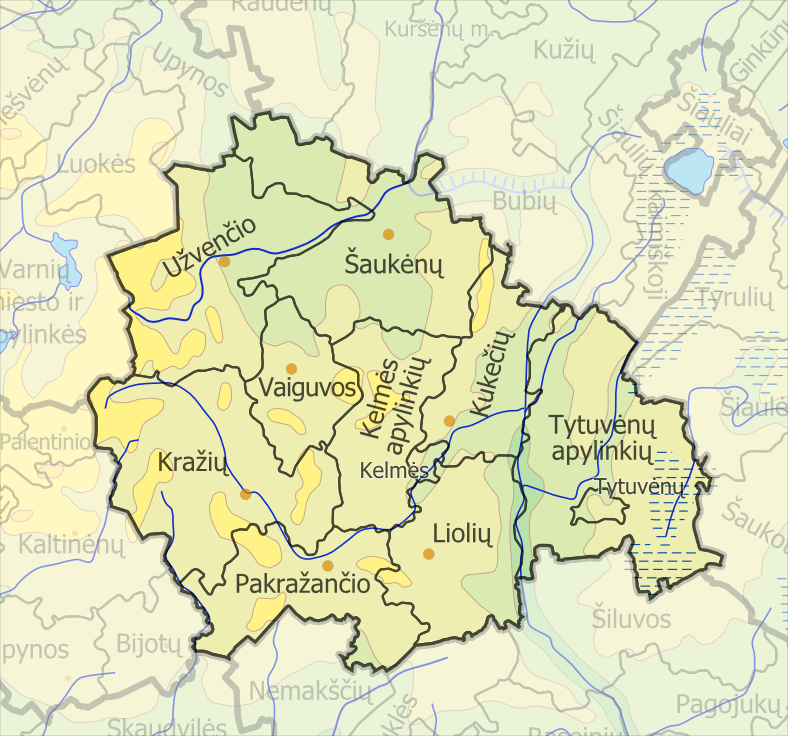
- Map of Kelmė district municipality
- Country: Lithuania
- Ethnographic region: Samogitia
- County: Šiauliai County
- Capital: Kelmė
- Elderships: 11

Area
  - Total: 1,705 km^{2} (658 sq mi)
  - Rank: 8th

Population (2021)
  - Total: 26,026
  - Rank: 27th
  - Density: 15.26/km^{2} (39.53/sq mi)
  - Rank: 45th
- Time zone: UTC+2 (EET)
  - Summer (DST): UTC+3 (EEST)
- Telephone code: 427
- Major settlements: Kelmė (pop. 7,544); Tytuvėnai (pop. 1,805)
- Website: www.kelme.lt

Kelmė District Municipality is one of 60 municipalities in Lithuania, located in western part of Lithuania.

== Elderships ==
Kelmė District Municipality is divided into 11 elderships:

Eldership (Administrative Center)	Area	Population (2021)
Kelmė Vicinity (Kelmė)	133.7 km^{2} (33,037.99 acres; 51.62 sq mi)	2,022
Kelmė (Kelmė)	7.85 km^{2} (1,939.78 acres; 3.03 sq mi)	7,688
Kražiai (Kražiai)	255 km^{2} (63,011.87 acres; 98.46 sq mi)	2,050
Kukečiai (Kukečiai)	120 km^{2} (29,652.65 acres; 46.33 sq mi)	1,322
Lioliai (Lioliai)	155 km^{2} (38,301.33 acres; 59.85 sq mi)	1,947
Pakražantis (Griniai)	160 km^{2} (39,536.86 acres; 61.78 sq mi)	1,643
Šaukėnai (Šaukėnai)	250 km^{2} (61,776.35 acres; 96.53 sq mi)	1,875
Tytuvėnai Vicinity (Tytuvėnai)	286.72 km^{2} (70,850.05 acres; 110.70 sq mi)	2,414
Tytuvėnai (Tytuvėnai)	9.8 km^{2} (2,421.63 acres; 3.78 sq mi)	1,850
Užventis (Užventis)	234 km^{2} (57,822.66 acres; 90.35 sq mi)	2,493
Vaiguva (Vaiguva)	91 km^{2} (22,486.59 acres; 35.14 sq mi)	722
