= Ignalina Česlovas Kudaba Progymnasium =

Coordinates: 55.34308°N 26.158157°E

- School coat of arms

Location
- Mokyklos g. 2 Ignalina; Lithuania

Information
- Type: Secondary
- Opened: 1939
- Director: Danutė Jatulė
- Student to teacher ratio: Students: 835. Teachers: 64.
- Hours in school day: 7-10
- Sports: Yes
- Website: http://kudabos.ignalina.lm.lt
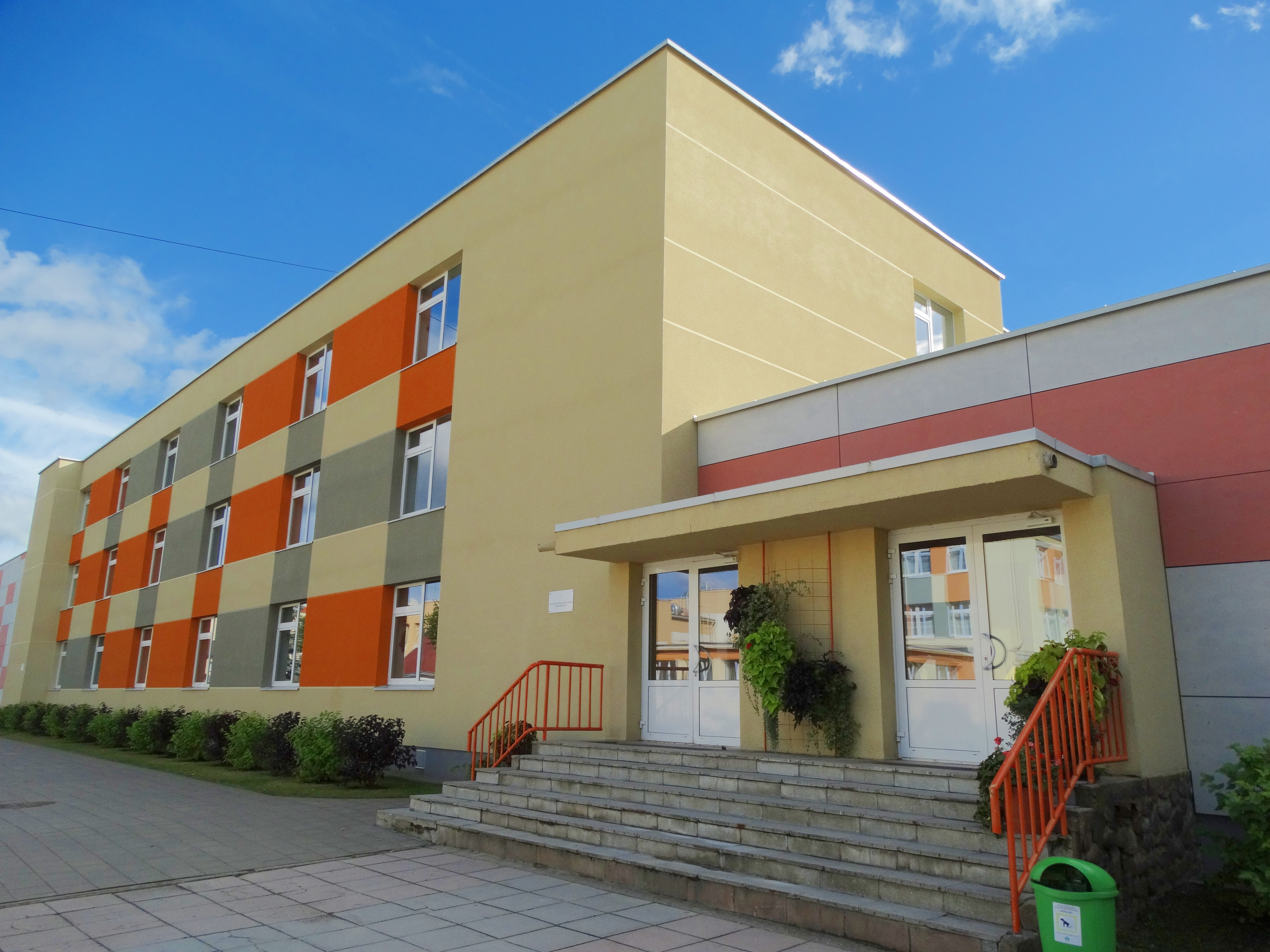
- School from pupils' house and hostel

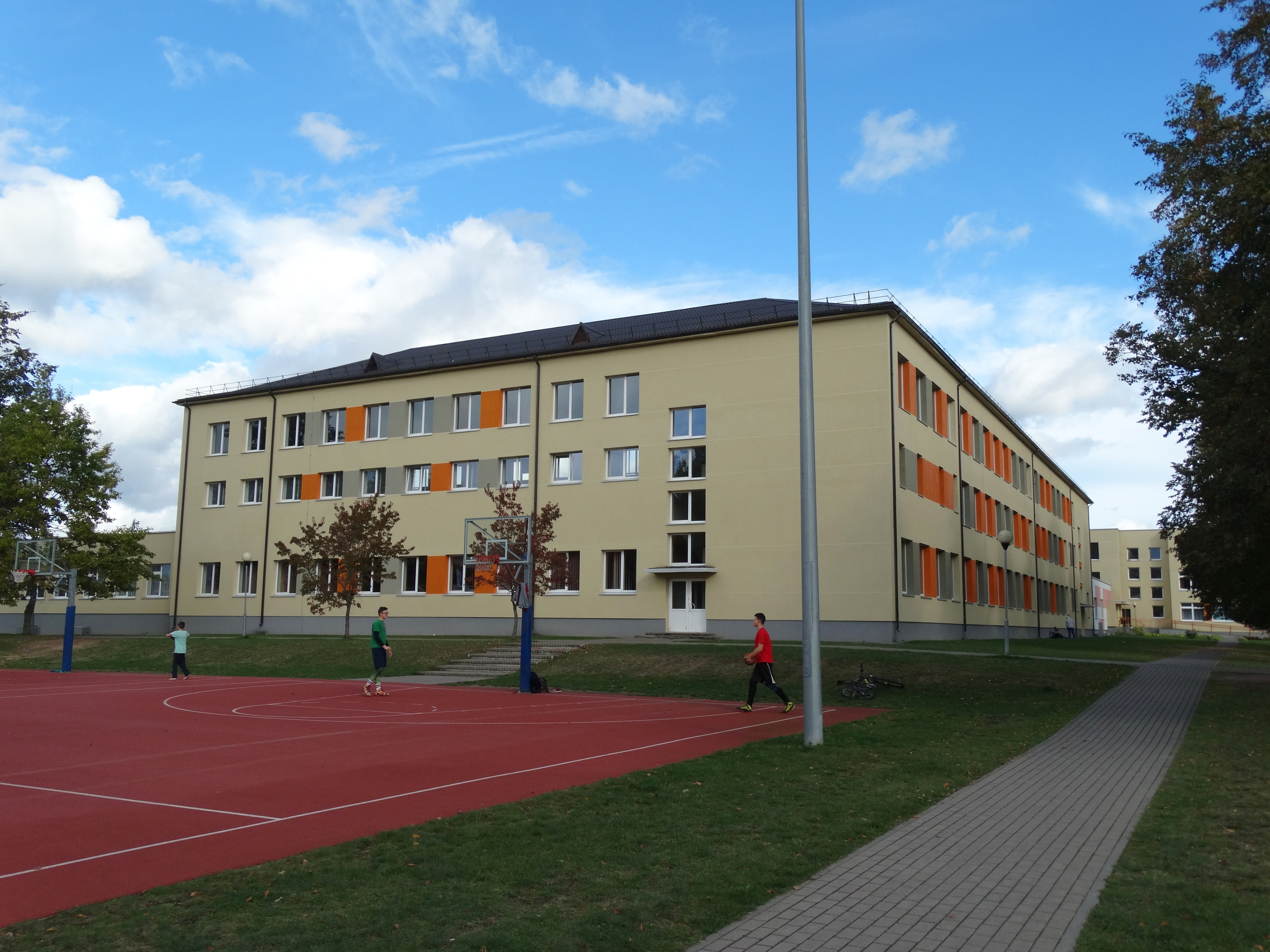
- School from stadion

Ignalina Česlovas Kudaba Progymnasium is a day, self-learning secondary school in Ignalina, Lithuania. It provides primary and middle school education programs in the Lithuanian language. It is named after Česlovas Kudaba, traveler and signatory of the Act of the Re-Establishment of the State of Lithuania. The school houses his small museum.

== History ==
In 1939–44, elementary school operated in Ignalina. In 1944, it became a progymnasium. 1 September 1946, a Lithuanian-language high school was opened.

In 1993, the school was named after Česlovas Kudaba. On 15 July 2002, after the establishment of the Ignalina district gymnasium, the school was reorganized into a primary school. On 15 July 2003, Ignalina district gymnasium was merged into the school. On 1 September 2003, schools in Bėčiūnai, Didžiasalis and Kazokinė were attached to the school. However, the next year Bėčiūnai and Didžiasalis schools closed due to the low number of students. Kazokinė section closed in 2005.

Since September 2005, the school operates an adult education class. On 31 August 2009, two other schools were merged in: Ceikiniai Kipras Petrauskas secondary school and Linkmenys primary school.

On 30 May 2013, the Council of the Ignalina District Municipality reorganized the school into the Ignalina Česlovas Kudaba Progymnasium.

== Notable students ==
- Česlovas Juršėnas
