= Aknysta (disambiguation) =

Aknysta may refer to:

- Aknīste, a town in Latvia
- Aknysta River in Lithuania
- Aknystos, a village in Lithuania
- Aknysčiai, a village in Lithuania
- Aknystėlės, a village in Lithuania
