= Mėšliai =

- Village
- Location in Lithuania
- Coordinates: 55°15′04″N 26°16′19″E
- Country: Lithuania
- County: Utena County
- Municipality: Ignalina district municipality
- Eldership: Ceikiniai eldership

Population (2011)
  - Total: 25
- Time zone: UTC+2 (EET)
  - Summer (DST): UTC+3 (EEST)

Mėšliai is a village in Ignalina District Municipality, Utena County, Lithuania. It is connected to Ceikiniai village. Mėšliai is quite small and there is an ancient farm located there.
