= Didžiasalis Eldership =

Eldership of Lithuania

Coordinates: 55°19′10″N 26°40′50″E

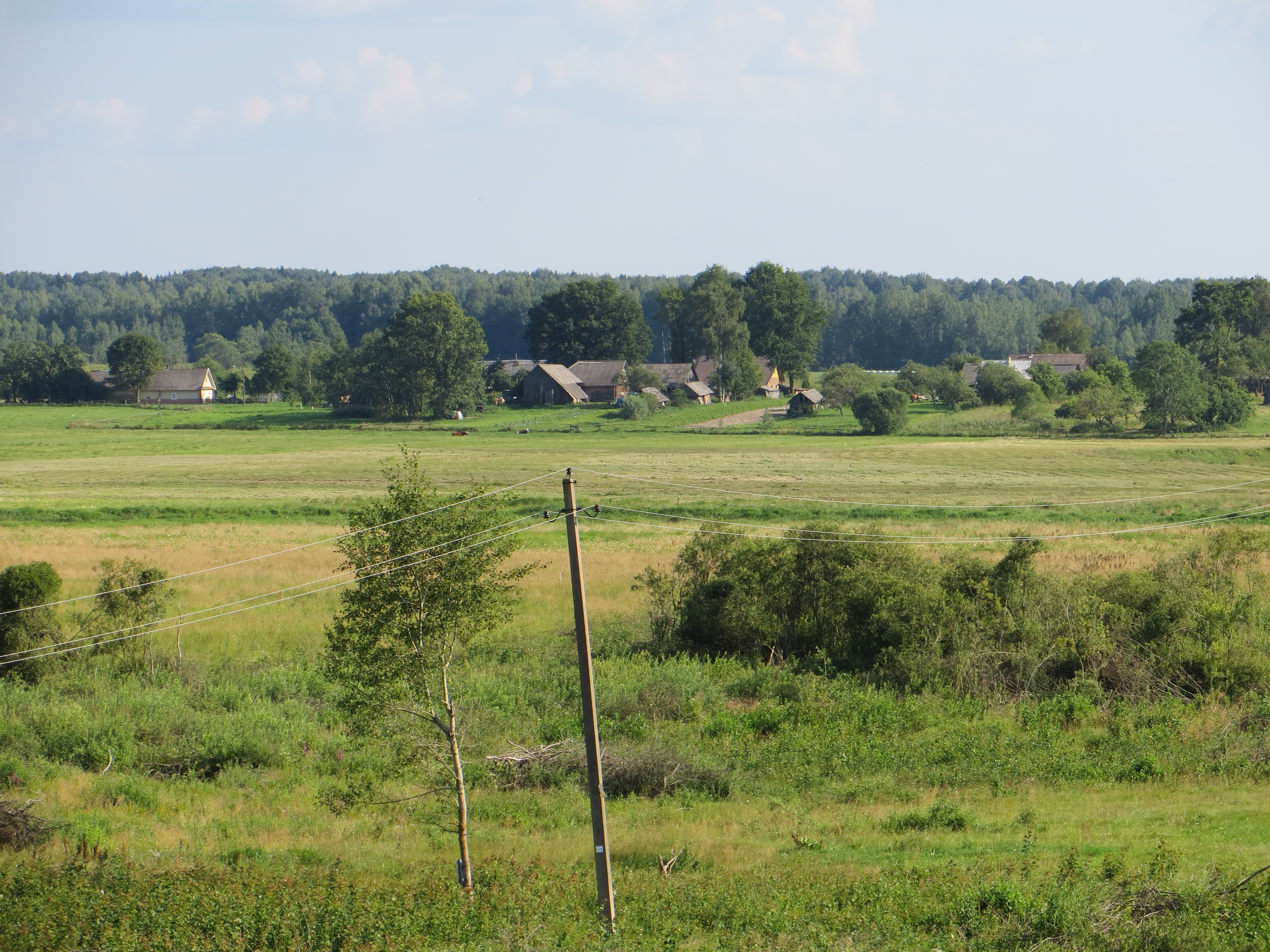
Didžiasalio sen., Lithuania

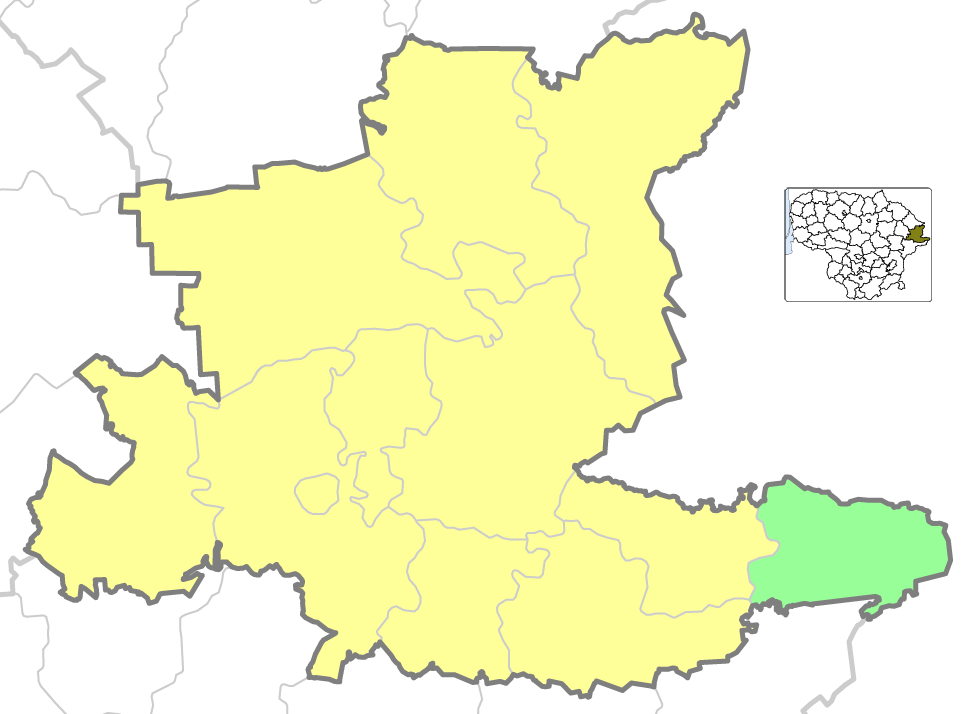
Didžiasalis Eldership within the Ignalina District

The Didžiasalis Eldership (Lithuanian: Didžiasalio seniūnija) is an eldership of Lithuania, located in the Ignalina District Municipality. The administrative center is Didžiasalis. In 2021 its population was 1222.
