= Aknysta (river) =

River in Lithuania

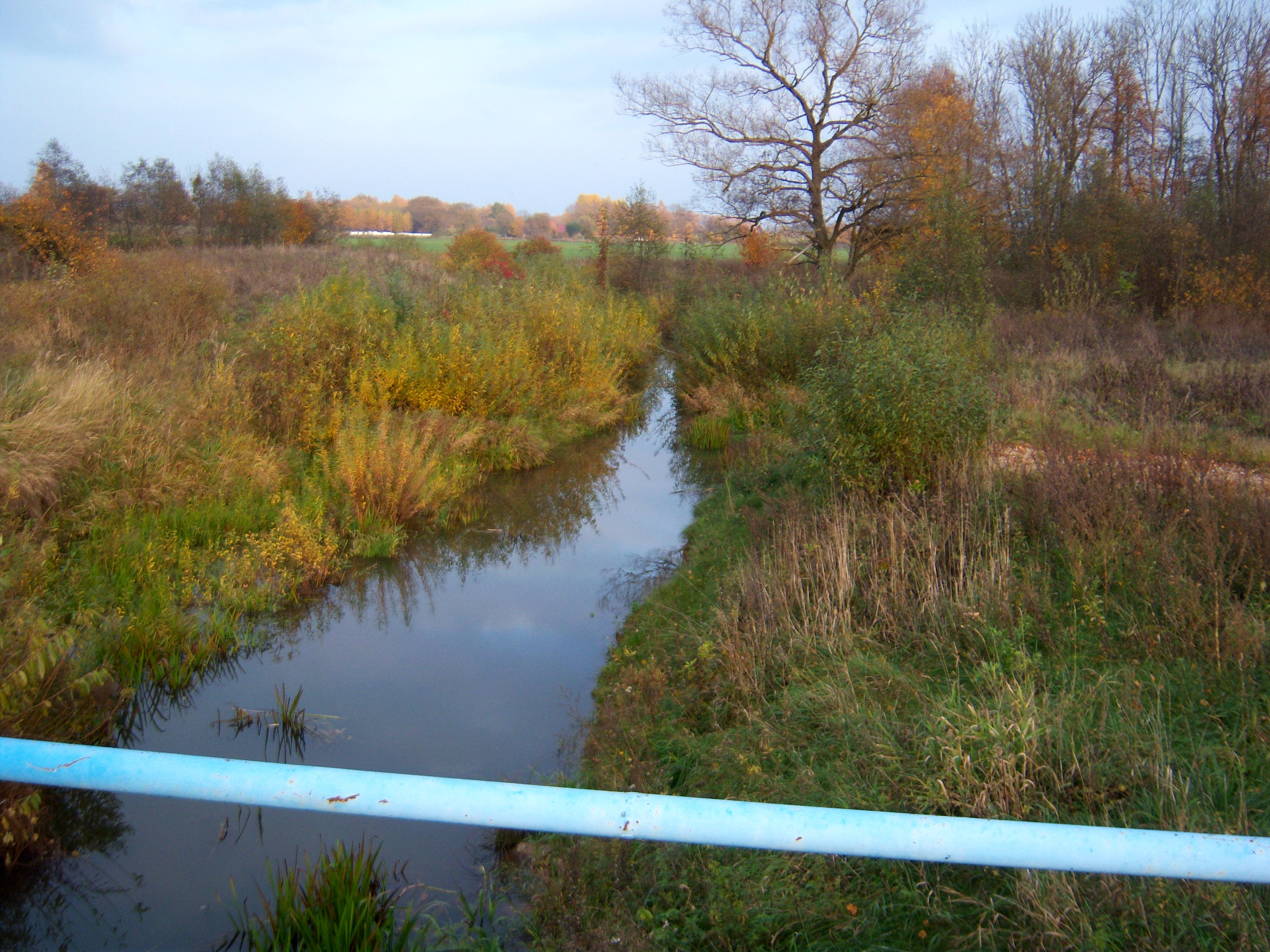
- Aknysta river nearby Aknystos

Location
- Country: Lithuania
- Location: Anykščiai district municipality, Utena County

Physical characteristics
- Source
  - location: Aknystėlis Lake
- Mouth: Šventoji
  - coordinates: 55°37′47″N 25°18′28″E
- Length: 18.2 km (11.3 mi)
- Basin size: 94.2 km^{2} (36.4 sq mi)
- Discharge
  - average: 0.87 m^{3}/s (31 cu ft/s)

Basin features
- Progression: Šventoji→ Neris→ Neman→ Baltic Sea
- Tributaries
  - left: Kilėva, Gėtys, Bigulis

The Aknysta is a river in Anykščiai district municipality, Utena County, in northeastern Lithuania. It originates from Aknystėlis Lake, flows through the Lipšys Lake, and as a left-bank tributary discharges into the Šventoji. It flows for 18.2 kilometres and has a basin area of 94.2 km². The villages Aknystos and Aknysčiai are situated along the river.

The hydronym Aknysta possibly derives from Lithuanian: akis 'eye, waterhole, ice-hole'.
