= Stripeikiai =

Coordinates: 55°24′27″N 25°56′19″E

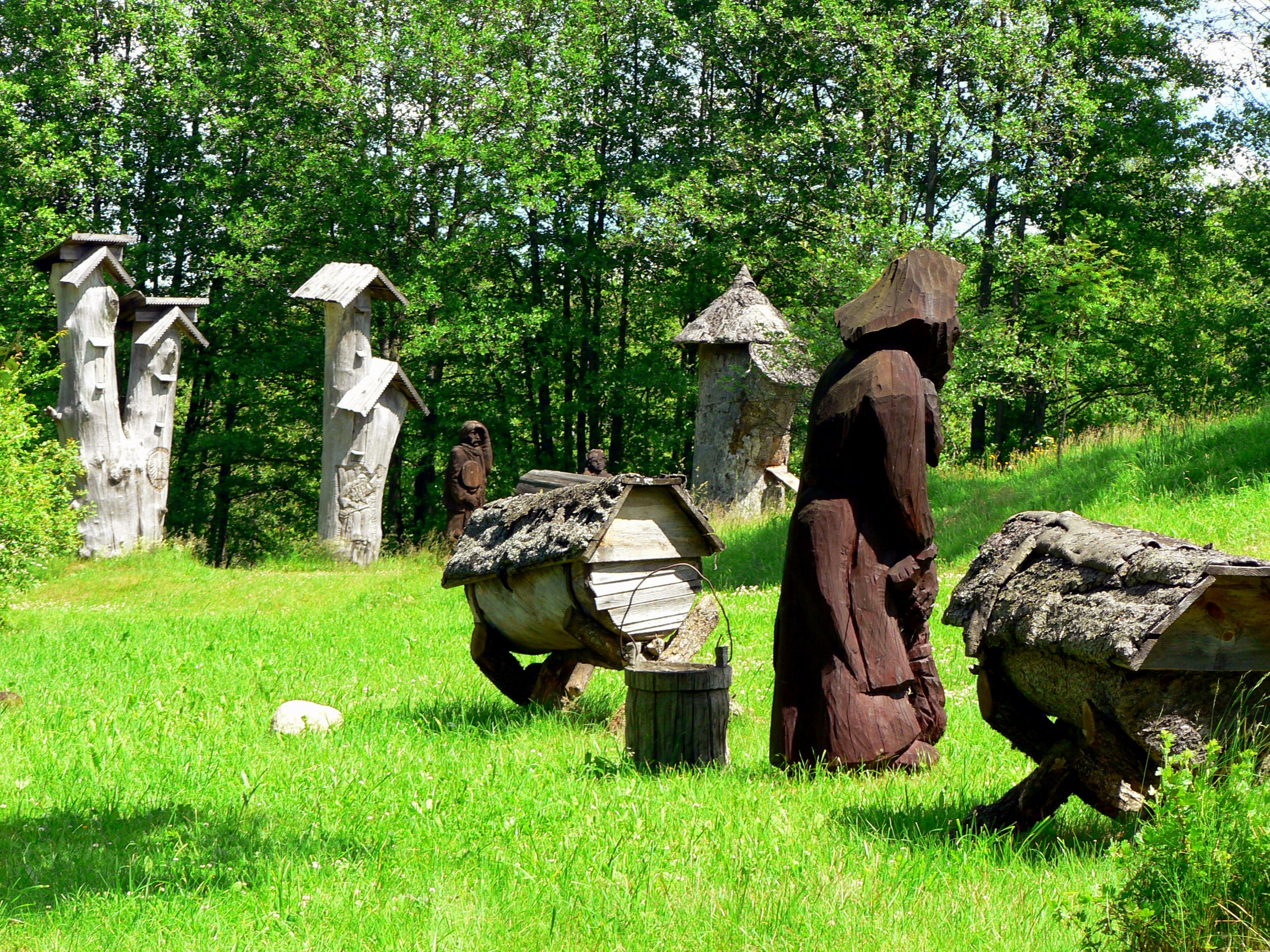
Wooden beehives in the beekeeping museum in Stripeikiai

Stripeikiai is the earliest known village in Aukštaitija National Park, Ignalina district best known for its unique ethnographic beekeeping museum. The museum was founded in 1974 by Bronius Kazlas at Vincas Bikus farmstead with a watermill and now receives about 10,000 visitors annually. The museum is all about the traditional beekeeping which was cultivated in this area throughout the ages. Guests still can taste fresh honey during their visit to the museum.
