= Mielagėnai =

- Town
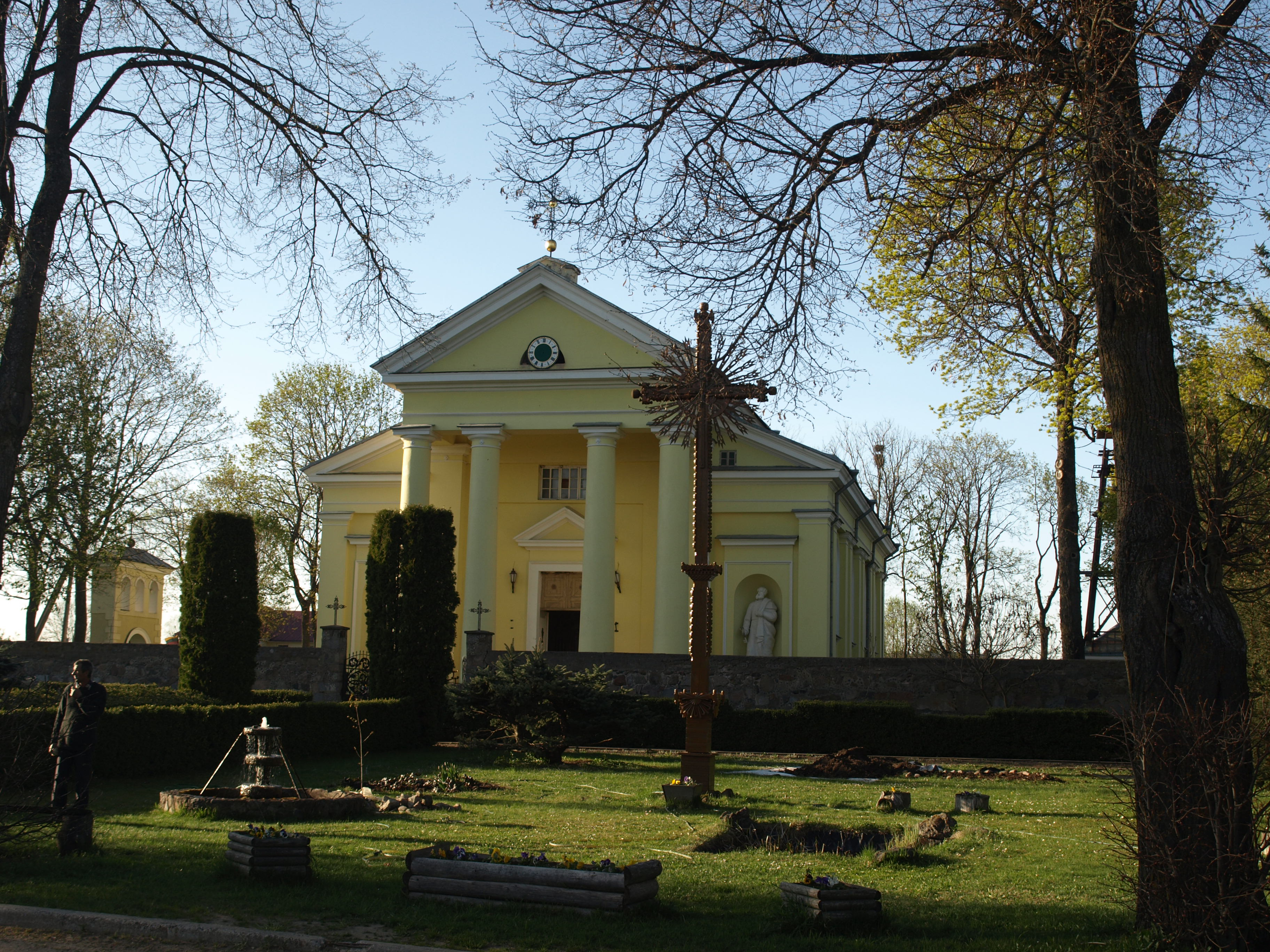

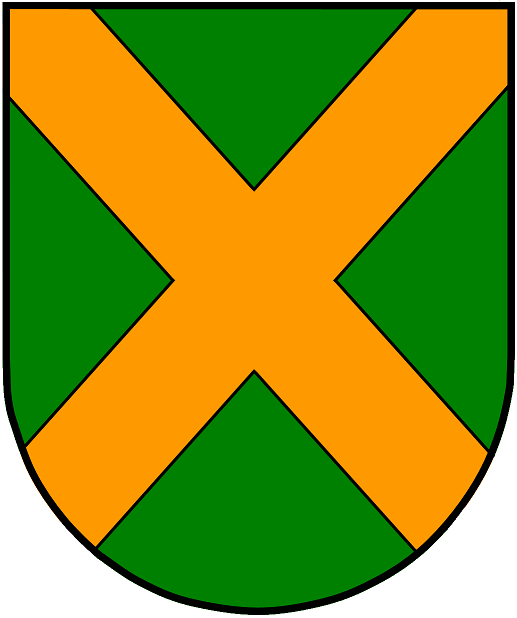
- Coat of arms

- Location in Lithuania
- Coordinates: 55°15′30″N 26°26′20″E
- Country: Lithuania
- County: Utena County
- Municipality: Ignalina district municipality
- Eldership: Mielagėnai eldership
- Capital of: Mielagėnai eldership

Population (2011)
  - Total: 236
- Time zone: UTC+2 (EET)
  - Summer (DST): UTC+3 (EEST)

Mielagėnai is a town in Ignalina district municipality, in Utena County, southern Lithuania. According to the 2011 census, the town has a population of 236 people. The town is home to a neoclassical brick church of John the Baptist. It was completed in 1790.

== Famous citizens ==
- Augustinas Janutėnas, the book smuggler.
