= Vidiškiai Eldership (Ignalina) =

Eldership of Lithuania

The Vidiškiai Eldership (Lithuanian: Vidiškių seniūnija) is an eldership of Lithuania, located in the Ignalina District Municipality. In 2021 its population was 1009.
