= Mielagėnai Eldership =

Eldership of Lithuania

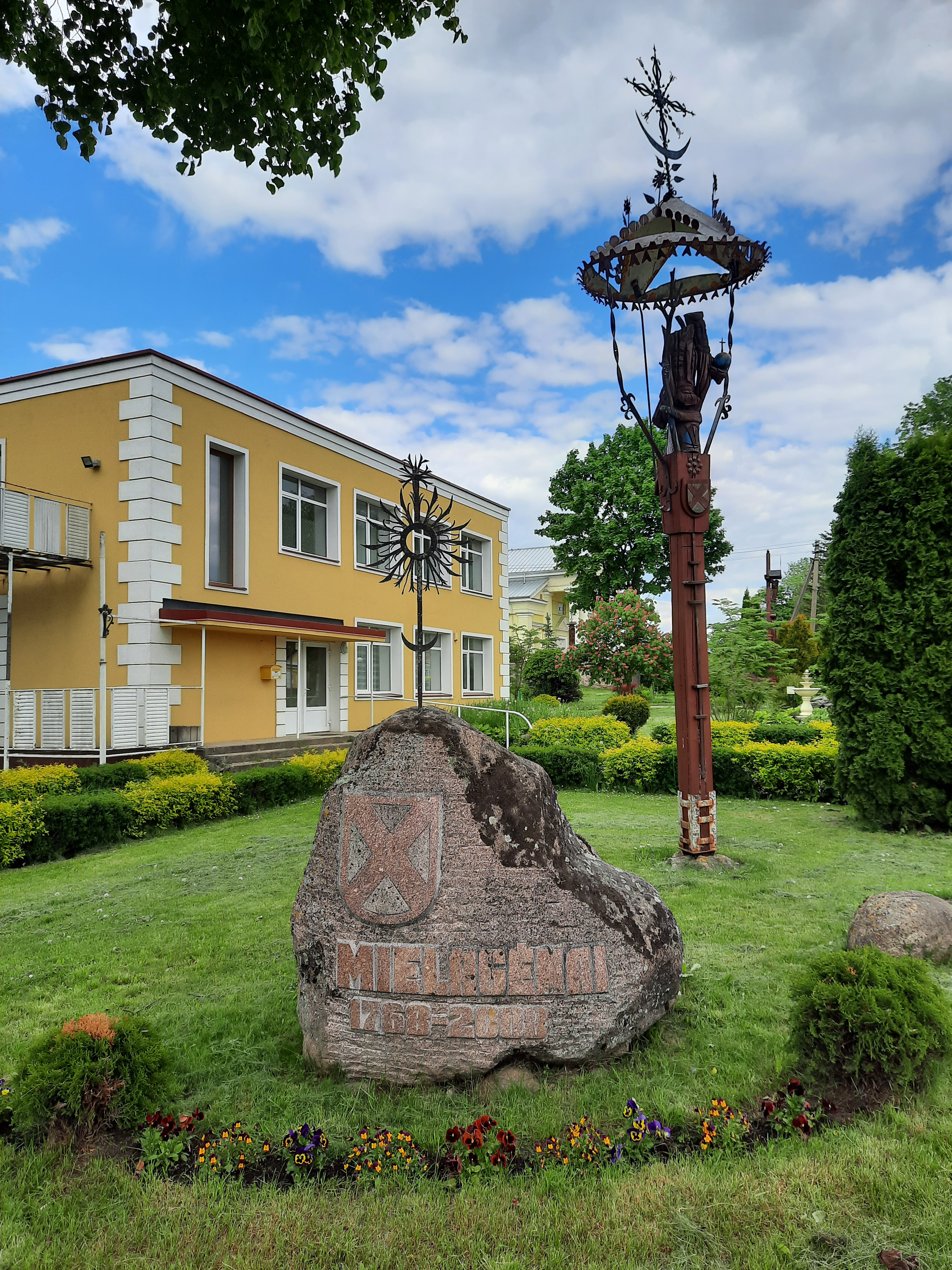
Mielagėnai administration

The Mielagėnai Eldership (Lithuanian: Mielagėnų seniūnija) is an eldership of Lithuania, located in the Ignalina District Municipality. In 2021, its population was 639.
