= Ceikiniai Eldership =

Eldership of Lithuania

The Ceikiniai Eldership (Lithuanian: Ceikinių seniūnija) is an eldership of Lithuania, located in the Ignalina District Municipality. In 2021 its population was 441.
