= Tverečius =

- Town
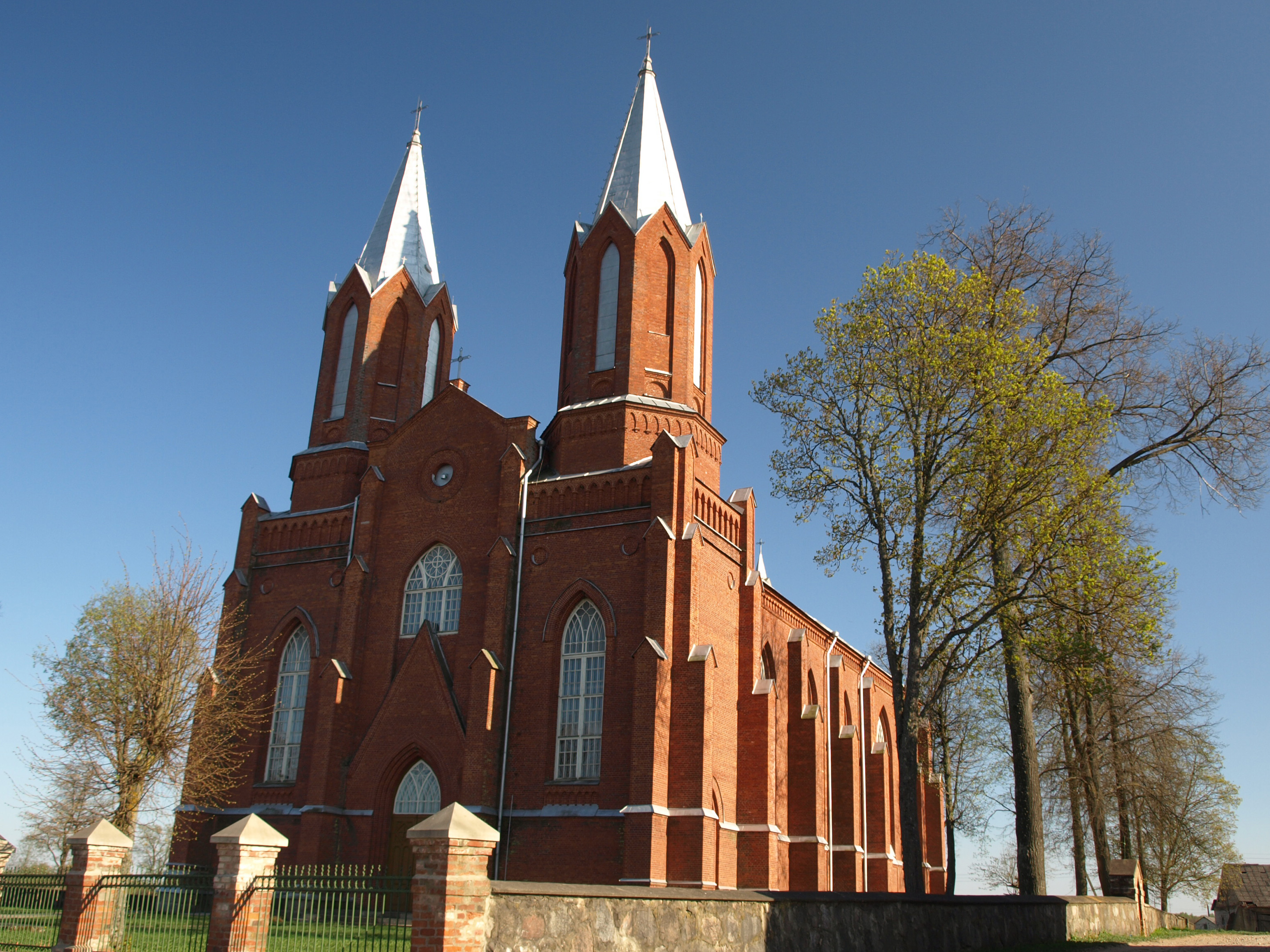

- Location in Lithuania
- Coordinates: 55°18′40″N 26°35′50″E
- Country: Lithuania
- County: Utena County
- Municipality: Ignalina district municipality
- Eldership: Tverečius eldership
- Capital of: Tverečius eldership

Population (2011)
  - Total: 231
- Time zone: UTC+2 (EET)
  - Summer (DST): UTC+3 (EEST)

Tverečius (Polish: Twerecz) is a town in Ignalina district municipality, in Utena County, eastern Lithuania. According to the 2011 census, the town has a population of 231 people.

== History ==
=== Grand Duchy of Lithuania ===
Tverečius was mentioned for the first time on 21 July 1501. On 24 July in the same year an order of Augustinians settled in the town.

=== Interwar period (1918–1939) ===
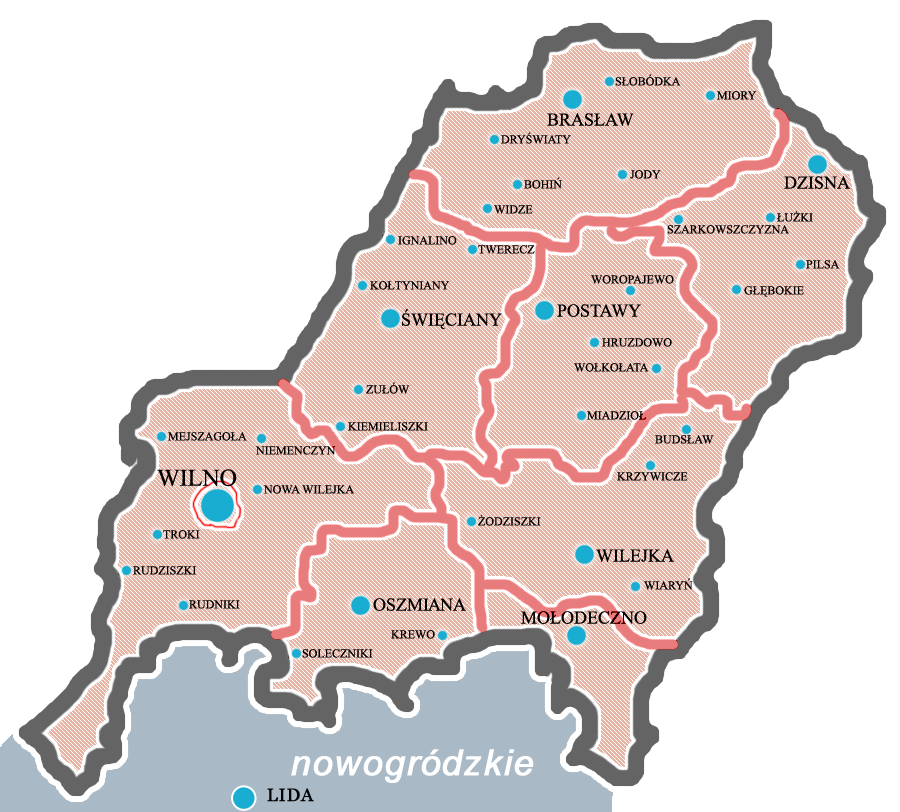
Map showing location of Tverečius (Polish: Twerecz) in Wilno Voivodeship during annexation into the Second Polish Republic.

In the aftermath of World War I, the newly independent countries of Lithuania and Poland found themselves in dispute over the Vilnius Region through two conflicts known as the Polish–Lithuanian War and Żeligowski's Mutiny. These conflicts resulted in the creation of the short-lived Republic of Central Lithuania in 1920. A disputed election in 1922 incorporated this territory into the Second Polish Republic through annexation.

As Tverečius was geographically part of the Vilnius Region, and subsequently included in the Republic of Central Lithuania, the town became Polish territory in March 1922: Tverečius found itself incorporated as Twerecz, part of Święciany (Lithuanian: Švenčionys) Powiat (county) in the newly created (1926) Wilno Voivodeship, the northeasternmost province then in Poland.

=== Soviet invasion of Poland ===
As part of the Soviet invasion of Poland, the Red Army defeated the Poles in the Battle of Wilno, and control of the Vilnius Region was fractured: Vileyka Voblast was a territorial unit in the Belarusian Soviet Socialist Republic created out of the eastern powiats of the Wilno Voivodeship after the annexation of West Belarus (then part of Poland) in November 1939. One of these eastern powiats was Święciany; thus Tverečius found itself included as part of the Belarusian SSR, albeit briefly. When the Soviet Union invaded Lithuania in 1940, Tverečius was transferred from the Belarusian SSR into the newly incorporated Lithuanian SSR.

== Dialect ==
The town uses the East Aukštaitija dialect.

== Notable people ==
- Boleslovas Jonas Masiulis (1889–1965), Lithuanian minister of justice, judge.
