= Naujasis Daugėliškis Eldership =

Eldership of Lithuania

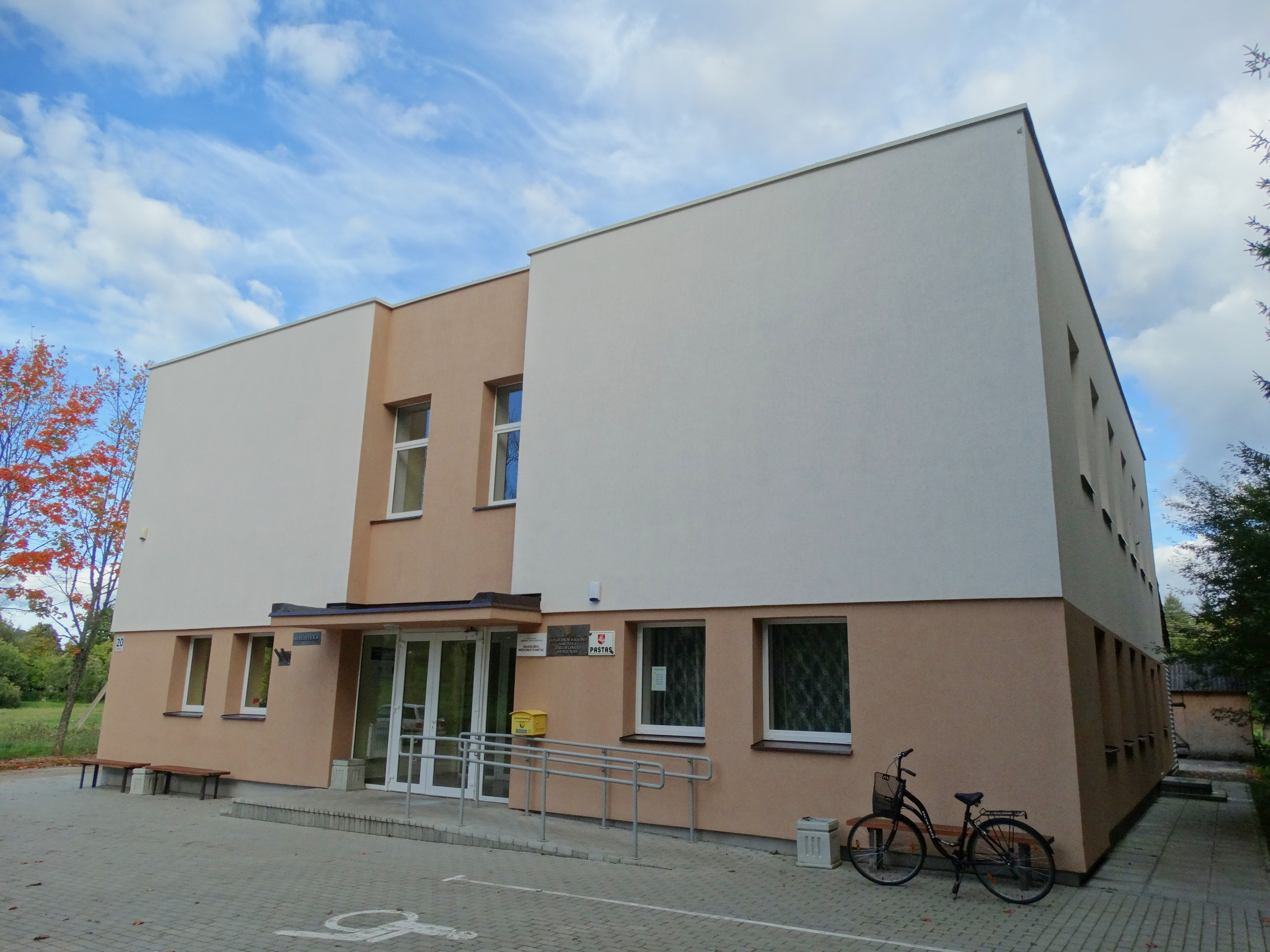
Naujasis Daugėliškis headquarters

The Naujasis Daugėliškis Eldership (Lithuanian: Naujojo Daugėliškio seniūnija) is an eldership of Lithuania, located in the Ignalina District Municipality. In 2021 its population was 1072.
