= Tverečius Eldership =

Eldership of Lithuania

The Tverečius Eldership (Lithuanian: Tverečiaus seniūnija) is an eldership of Lithuania, located in the Ignalina District Municipality. In 2021 its population was 382.
