= Dūkštas Eldership =

Eldership of Lithuania

The Dūkštas Eldership (Lithuanian: Dūkšto seniūnija) is an eldership of Lithuania, located in the Ignalina District Municipality. In 2021, its population was 1291.
