= Kazitiškis =

- Village
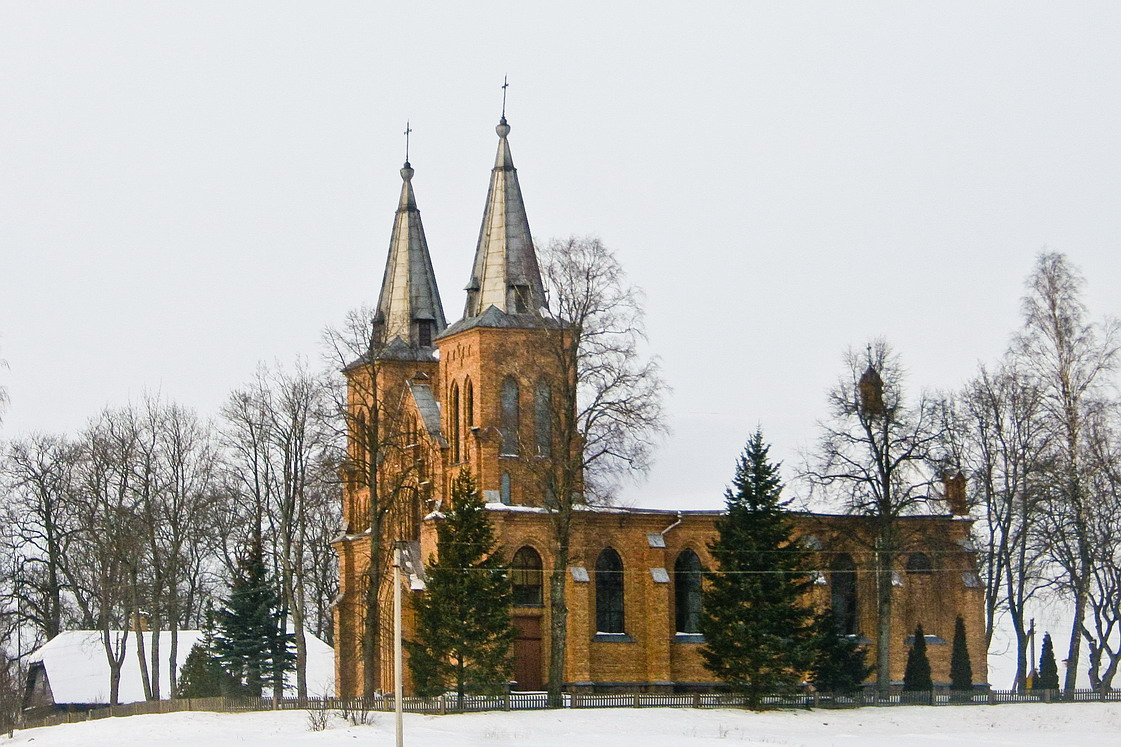

- Location in Lithuania
- Coordinates: 55°26′30″N 26°08′40″E
- Country: Lithuania
- County: Utena County
- Municipality: Ignalina district municipality
- Eldership: Kazitiškis eldership
- Capital of: Kazitiškis eldership

Population (2011)
  - Total: 343
- Time zone: UTC+2 (EET)
  - Summer (DST): UTC+3 (EEST)

Kazitiškis is a village in Ignalina district municipality, in Utena County, southern Lithuania. The village is 11 km to North from Ignalina town, close to Švogina river and Gilutis lake.

According to the 2011 census, the town has a population of 343 people.
