= Rimšė Eldership =

Eldership of Lithuania

The Rimšė Eldership (Lithuanian: Rimšės seniūnija) is an eldership of Lithuania, located in the Ignalina District Municipality. In 2021 its population was 624.
