= Ignalina Eldership =

Eldership of Lithuania

The Ignalina Eldership (Lithuanian: Ignalinos seniūnija) is an eldership of Lithuania, located in the Ignalina District Municipality. In 2021 its population was 1830.
