= Rimšė =

- Town
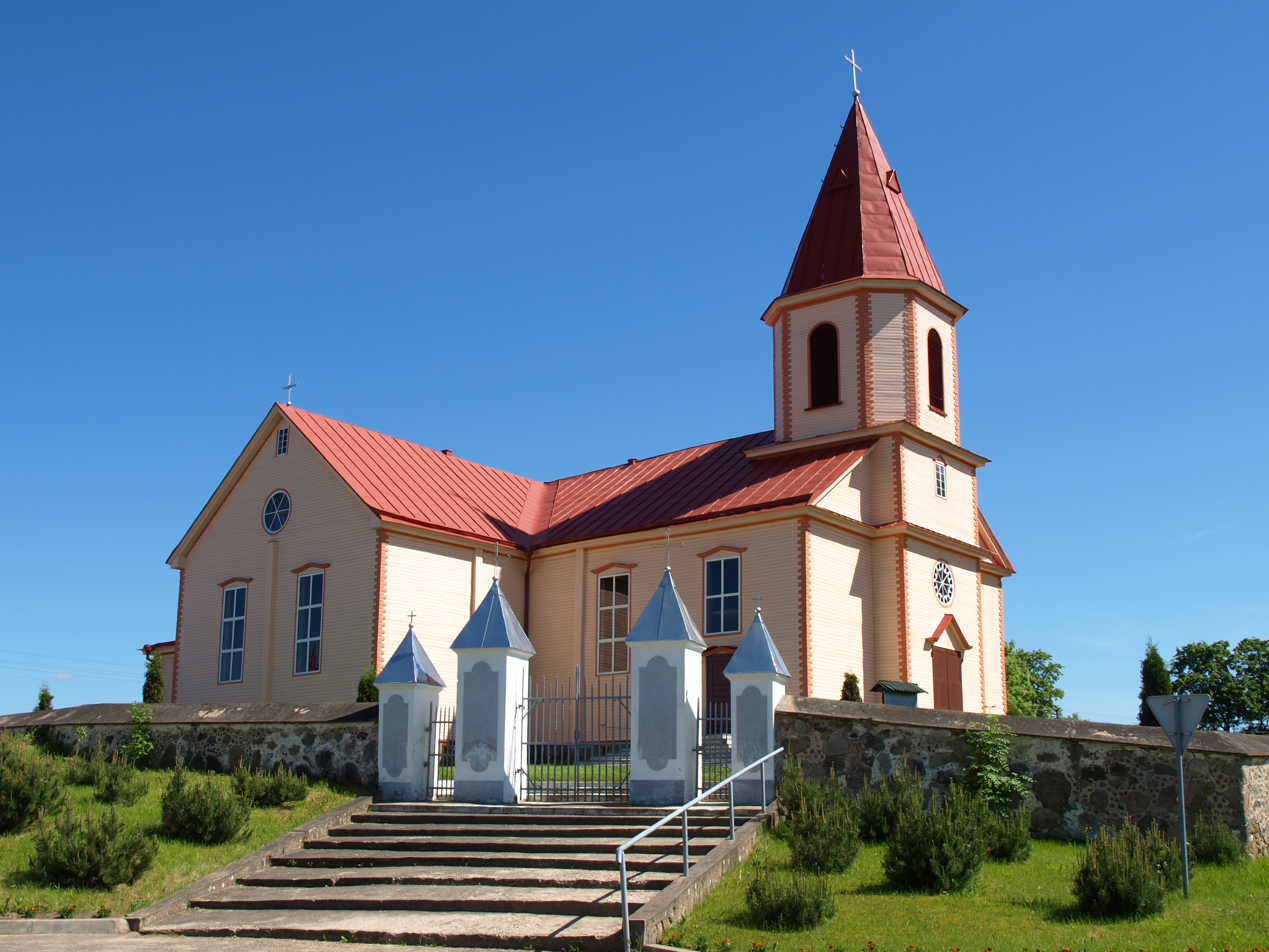
- Church of the Holy Trinity in Rimšė

- Location of Rimšė
- Coordinates: 55°31′20″N 26°26′40″E
- Country: Lithuania
- Ethnographic region: Aukštaitija
- County: Utena County
- Municipality: Ignalina district municipality
- Eldership: Rimšė eldership
- Capital of: Rimšė eldership

Population (2011)
  - Total: 208
- Time zone: UTC+2 (EET)
  - Summer (DST): UTC+3 (EEST)

Rimšė (Polish: Rymszany) is a town in the Ignalina district municipality, Utena County, Lithuania, The centre of the Rimšė Eldership is located here.

== History ==
In the interwar period it belonged to the Wilno Land/Wilno Voivodeship of the Second Polish Republic, together with the municipality (gmina) of which it was the capital: Rymszany Municipality. According to the 1921 Polish census, the town had a population of 290, 52.1% Jewish and 42.1% Polish.
