= Vidiškės =

- Village
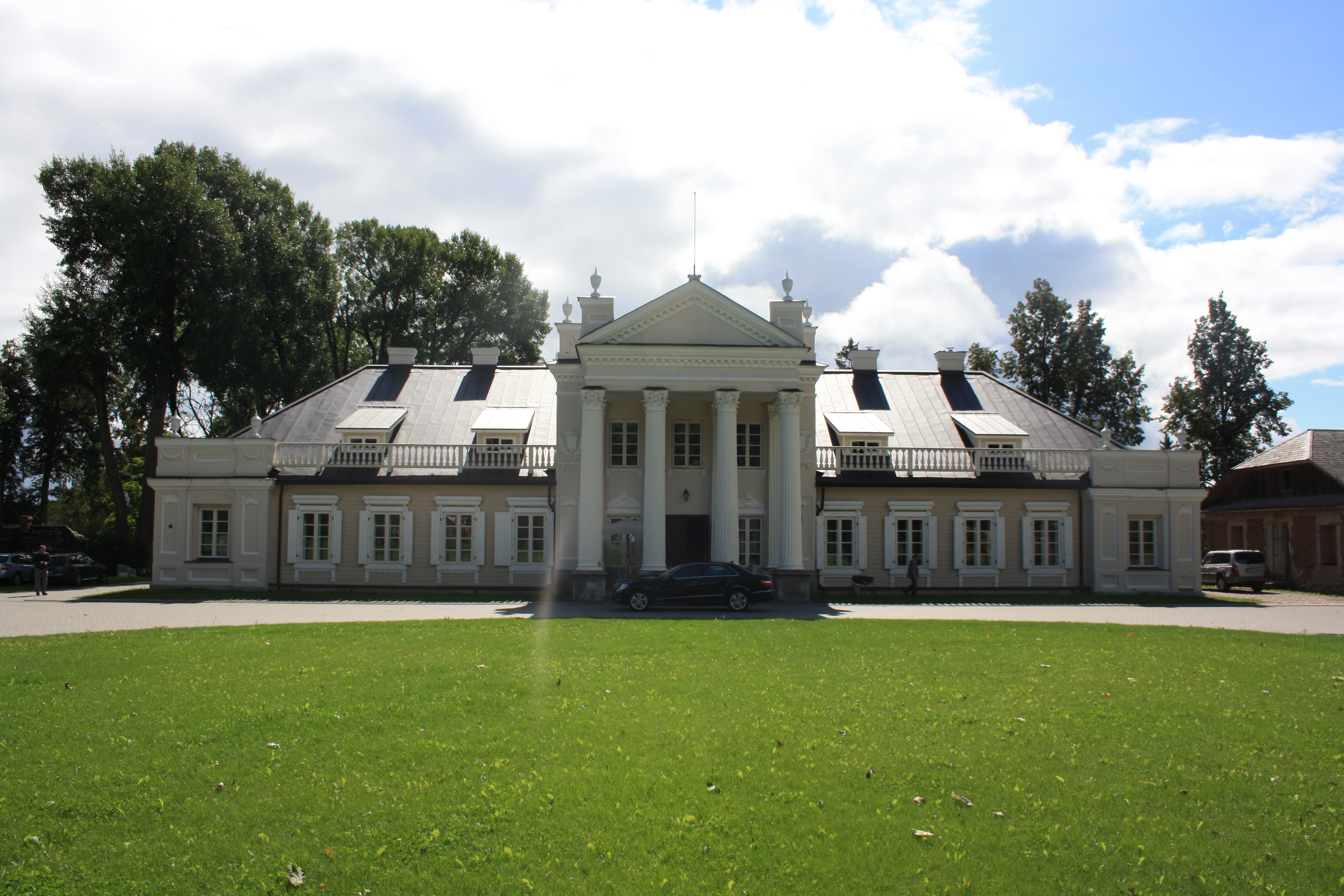
- Vidiškės Manor

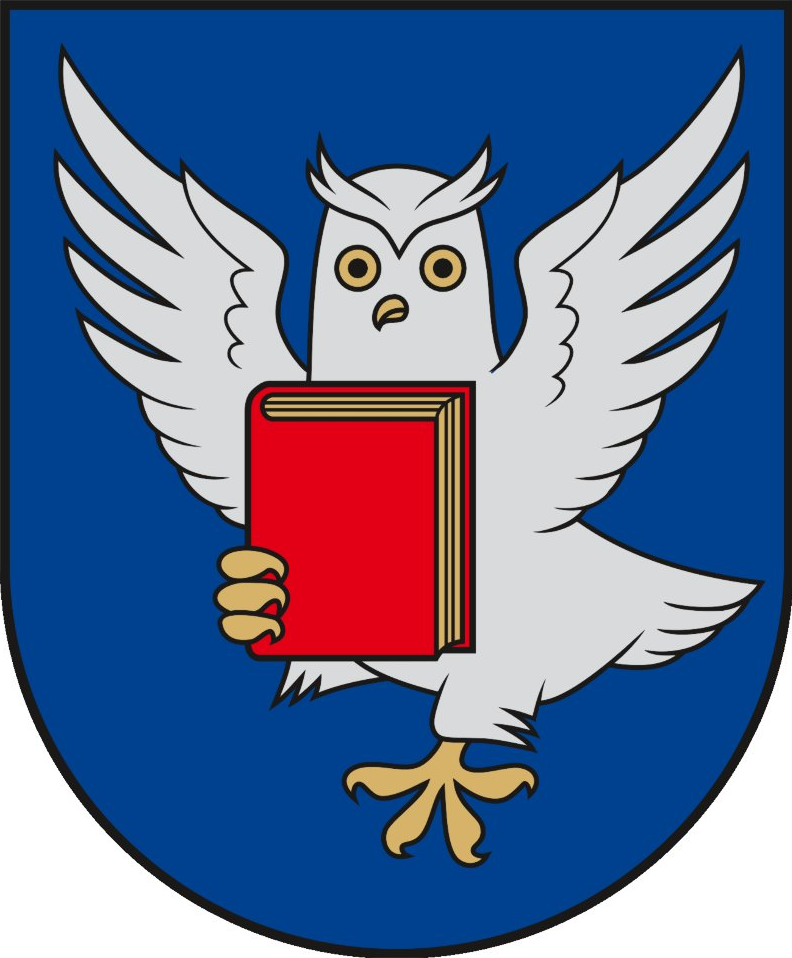
- Coat of arms

- Location in Lithuania
- Coordinates: 55°22′30″N 26°12′40″E
- Country: Lithuania
- County: Utena County
- Municipality: Ignalina district municipality
- Eldership: Vidiškės eldership
- Capital of: Vidiškės eldership

Population (2021)
  - Total: 818
- Time zone: UTC+2 (EET)
  - Summer (DST): UTC+3 (EEST)

Vidiškės is a village in Ignalina district municipality, in Utena County, southern Lithuania. According to the 2011 census, the town has a population of 931 people.

The village has a church (built in 1906) and Vidiškės manor (from XVII C.) with its 6 buildings. Between Varnio Lake and Vidiškės manor there is a large park. The village has a gymnasium, a library and a post office (ZIP code: 30030).

== Etymology ==
Vidiškės is a possessive place name, a derivative of the suffix -iškės and the Lithuanian masculine given name Vidas. In other languages, the village was formerly known as: Polish: Przyjaźń.

== Famous citizens ==
- Algimantas Šalna (b. 1959), Lithuanian biathlete, World and Olympic champion.
