= Ignacy Oziewicz =

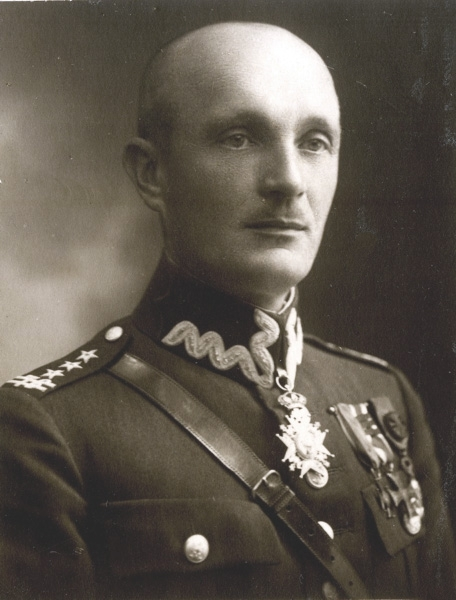
- Col. Ignacy Oziewicz (before 1939)
- Nicknames: Czesław, Czesławski, Netta, Jenczewski
- Born: 7 May 1887; Linkmenys, Russian Empire
- Died: 10 January 1966 (aged 78) Gdynia, Poland
- Branch: Imperial Russian Army, Polish Land Forces, National Military Organization, National Armed Forces
- Rank: Colonel
- Conflicts: World War I Polish–Soviet War; World War II

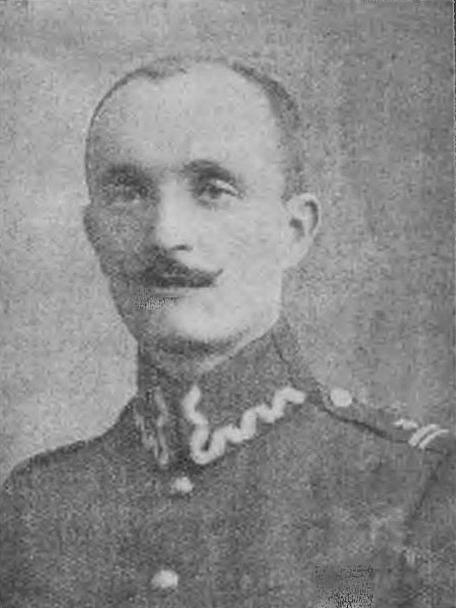
Ignacy Oziewicz in the rank of major

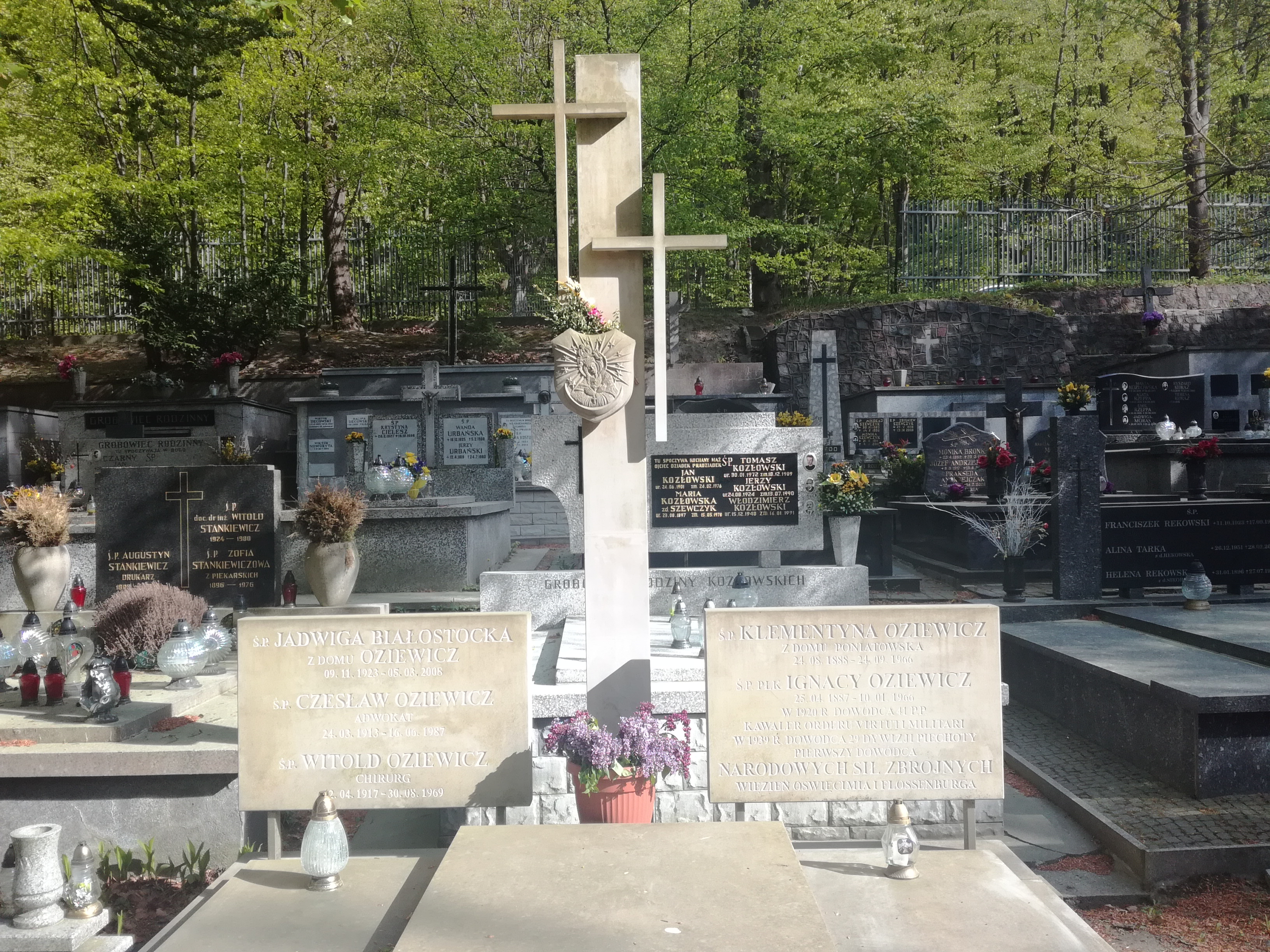
Grave of Colonel Ignacy Oziewicz in Gdynia

Ignacy Oziewicz, pseudonyms: "Czesław", "Czesławski", "Netta", "Jenczewski" (7 May 1887 – 10 January 1966) was a colonel of the Polish Army and a commandant of the National Armed Forces from 1942 to 1943.

== Biography ==
=== Early life and military career ===
Oziewicz was born on 7 May 1887 in the village of Linkmenys, near Švenčionys, Russian Empire (Lithuania). After graduation from a Vilnius high school (1907), he volunteered for the Imperial Russian Army. In 1911, he graduated from the Vilnius Military School, and during World War I was an officer of the 103rd Infantry Regiment, part of 26th Infantry Division. Between April and October 1917, he served in 193rd Infantry Division, leaving the Russian army after the October Revolution. Between October 1917 and late 1918, Oziewicz managed real estate in Podolia.

In February 1919, Oziewicz joined the Polish Army. In October of that year, he was named commandant of 41st Infantry Regiment, and on 20 August 1920, he became commandant of 17th Infantry Regiment. In October 1925, he was named commandant of 76th Lida Infantry Regiment, stationed at Grodno. On 16 March 1927, President Ignacy Mościcki, upon a request of Minister of Military Affairs Józef Piłsudski, promoted him to Colonel. In 1935, Oziewicz was transferred to 16th Pomeranian Infantry Division, stationed in Grudziądz, where he commanded infantry. On 25 October 1938 he was appointed commandant of 29th Grodno Infantry Division.

=== World War II ===
During the 1939 German Invasion of Poland, he commanded the 29th Grodno Infantry Division. After breaking it, he managed to get to Lithuania, where he was interned. He escaped and returned to occupied Poland.

From 1941 to 1942, he was deputy of the Commander-in-Chief and head of the operational department of the National Military Organization (NOW). Oziewicz did not accept the decision to merge this organization with the Home Army (AK) because he considered it politically controlled by the Sanation. In the summer of 1942, he headed the split in NOW. He began to form the National Armed Forces (NSZ). On 20 September 1942, he became the first commandant of the NSZ.

He attempted to communicate with general Stefan Rowecki to include NSZ in the Home Army. On 9 June 1943, he was arrested by the Gestapo and imprisoned in Pawiak prison. In October of the same year, he was sent to Auschwitz concentration camp. In January 1945 he was evacuated to Flossenbürg concentration camp.

=== Post-war life ===
After being released by the United States Army in April 1945, Oziewicz was in Allied-occupied Germany. Then he moved to France, where he became active in Polish émigré social organizations. He was the representative of the NSZ community before the Home Army Verification Commission in London. In July 1949 he became the president of the "Ogniwo" organization founded in France.

In 1958 Oziewicz returned to the Poland. He settled with his family in Gdynia. He died in 1966, due to leukemia.

== Honours and awards ==
- Virtuti Militari, Silver Cross
- Cross of Valour, 4 times
- Officer's Cross of the Order of Polonia Restituta
- Gold Cross of Merit

== Sources ==
- Tadeusz Jurga: Obrona Polski 1939. Warszawa: Instytut Wydawniczy PAX, 1990.
- Andrzej Krzysztof Kunert: Słownik biograficzny konspiracji warszawskiej 1939–1945 T.2. Warszawa: Instytut Wydawniczy PAX, 1987.
