= Linkmenys =

- Village
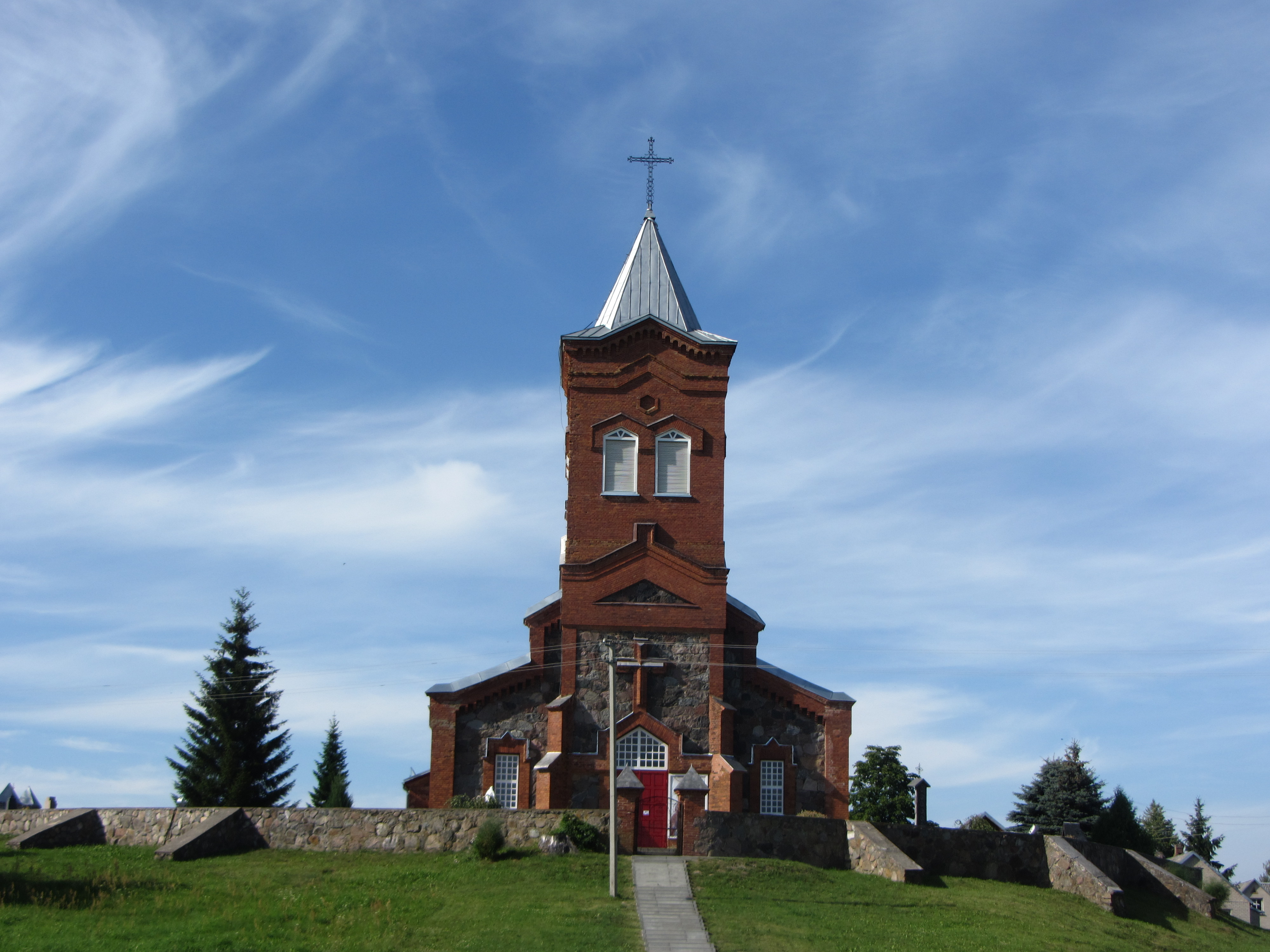
- Holy Trinity church

- Location of Linkmenys
- Coordinates: 55°19′08″N 25°57′22″E
- Country: Lithuania
- Ethnographic region: Aukštaitija
- County: Utena County
- Municipality: Ignalina District Municipality
- Eldership: Linkmenys eldership

Population (2011)
  - Total: 134
- Time zone: UTC+2 (EET)
  - Summer (DST): UTC+3 (EEST)

Linkmenys (Polish: Łyngmiany) is a village located in Ignalina District Municipality in Utena County, in eastern Lithuania. According to the 2011 census, the village had a population of 134 inhabitants.

== History ==
Linkmenys was the location of one of many Roman Catholic churches where the priests had to know the Lithuanian language according to the Grand Duke of Lithuania Alexander Jagiellon in 1501

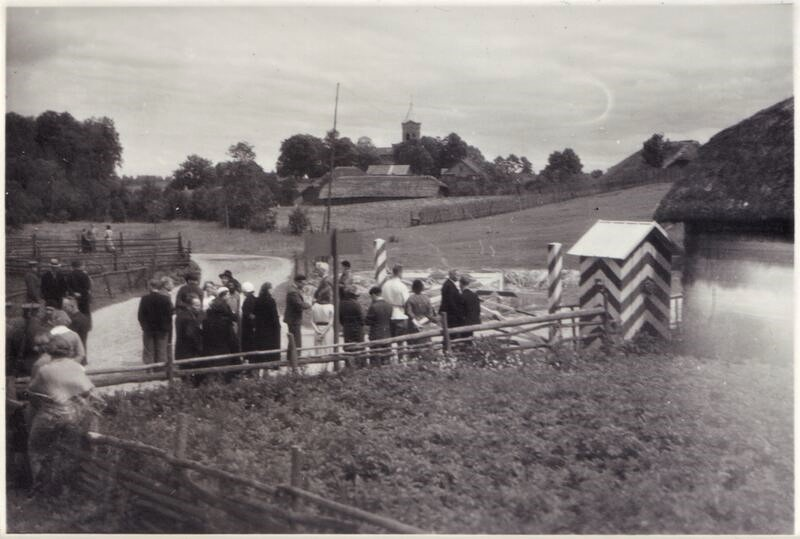
Polish border crossing splitting the village in 1935

In Hermann von Wartberge's Chronicon Livoniale it is referred to as Linkmenys Castle, which probably stood on Ginučiai Hillfort. Around 1500, the local church has been erected. Sigismund II Augustus had a manor and a town which belonged to the manor in Linkmenys.

In 1922, 2 years after Polish–Lithuanian War, the Polish soldiers in Lithuanian school of Linkmenys butted the Vytis as "foreign state sign".

During the interwar period, the village was split by the Polish-Lithuanian demarcation line, however the bigger part of the village was part of Poland. Administratively, it was located in Święciany County in Wilno Voivodeship.

=== World War II ===
During World War II, it was first invaded and occupied by the Soviet Union until 1941, and then by Nazi Germany until 1944. In mid-July 1941, 70 Jewish men, women and children were murdered in a mass execution perpetrated by an Einsatzgruppen and Lithuanian collaborators. A memorial stone is erected at the site of the massacre.

== Notable people ==
- Ignacy Oziewicz (1887–1966), Polish military officer
