= Aknysčiai =

- Village
- Location within Lithuania
- Coordinates: 55.614°N 25.308°E
- Country: Lithuania
- County: Utena County

Population
  - Total: 33
- Time zone: Eastern European Time (UTC+2)
  - Summer (DST): Eastern European Summer Time (UTC+3)

Aknysčiai is a village in Anykščiai district municipality, Utena County, Lithuania. The population was 33 at the 2011 census. It is located near the Anykšta river.
