= Aknystos =

- Village
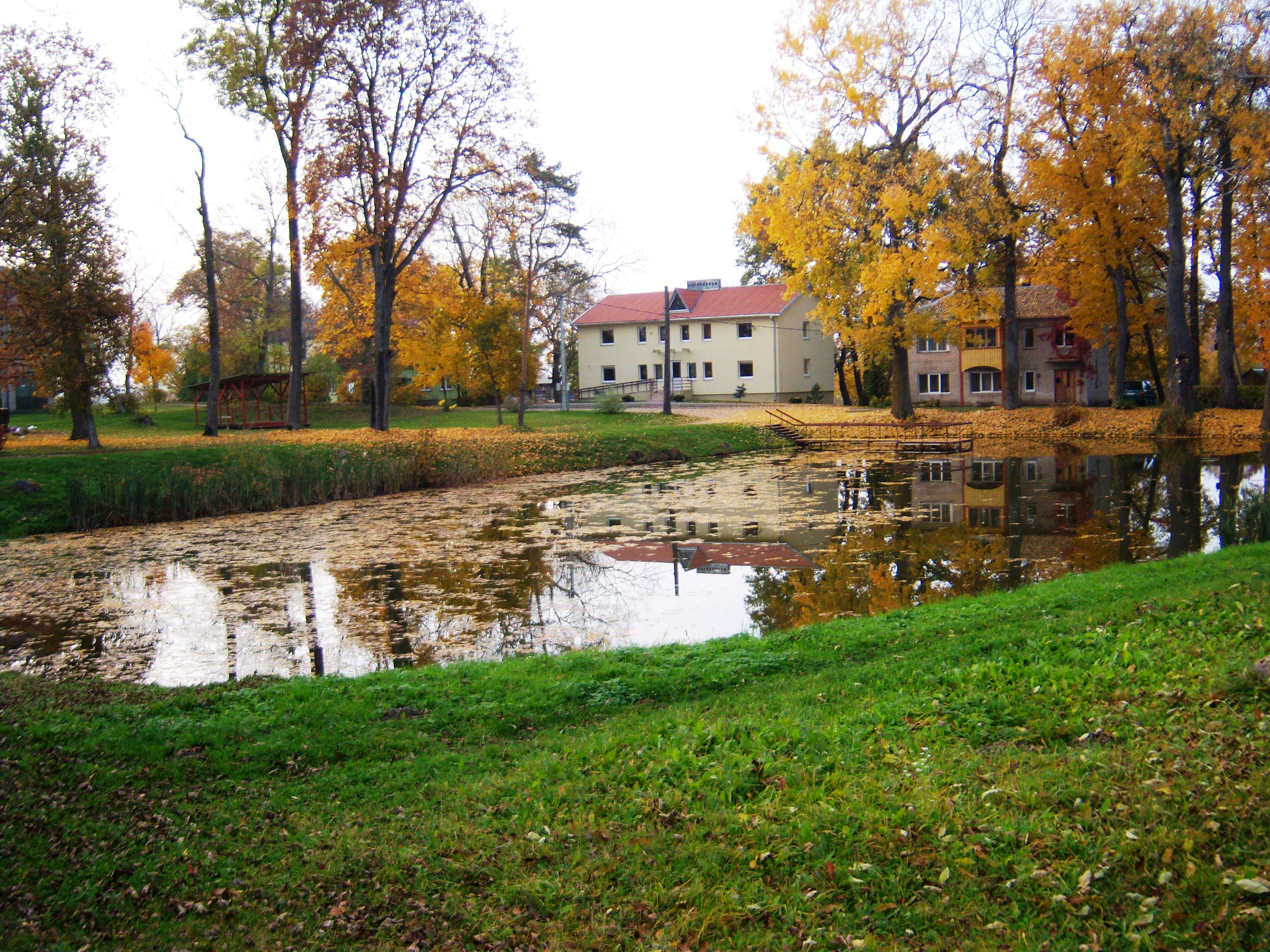
- Former Aknystos Manor

- Location within Lithuania
- Coordinates: 55°35′00″N 25°21′50″E
- Country: Lithuania
- County: Utena County
- Municipality: Anykščiai

Population (2011)
  - Total: 238
- Time zone: UTC+2 (EET)
  - Summer (DST): UTC+3 (EEST)

Aknystos is a village in Anykščiai district municipality of Utena County, in northeast Lithuania. According to the 2011 census, the village had 238 residents. The village is established on Anykšta river. First time mentioned in 1538.
