= Ceikiniai =

- Village
- Location in Lithuania
- Coordinates: 55°15′22″N 26°15′40″E
- Country: Lithuania
- County: Utena County
- Municipality: Ignalina district municipality
- Eldership: Ceikiniai eldership

Population (2011)
  - Total: 174
- Time zone: UTC+2 (EET)
  - Summer (DST): UTC+3 (EEST)

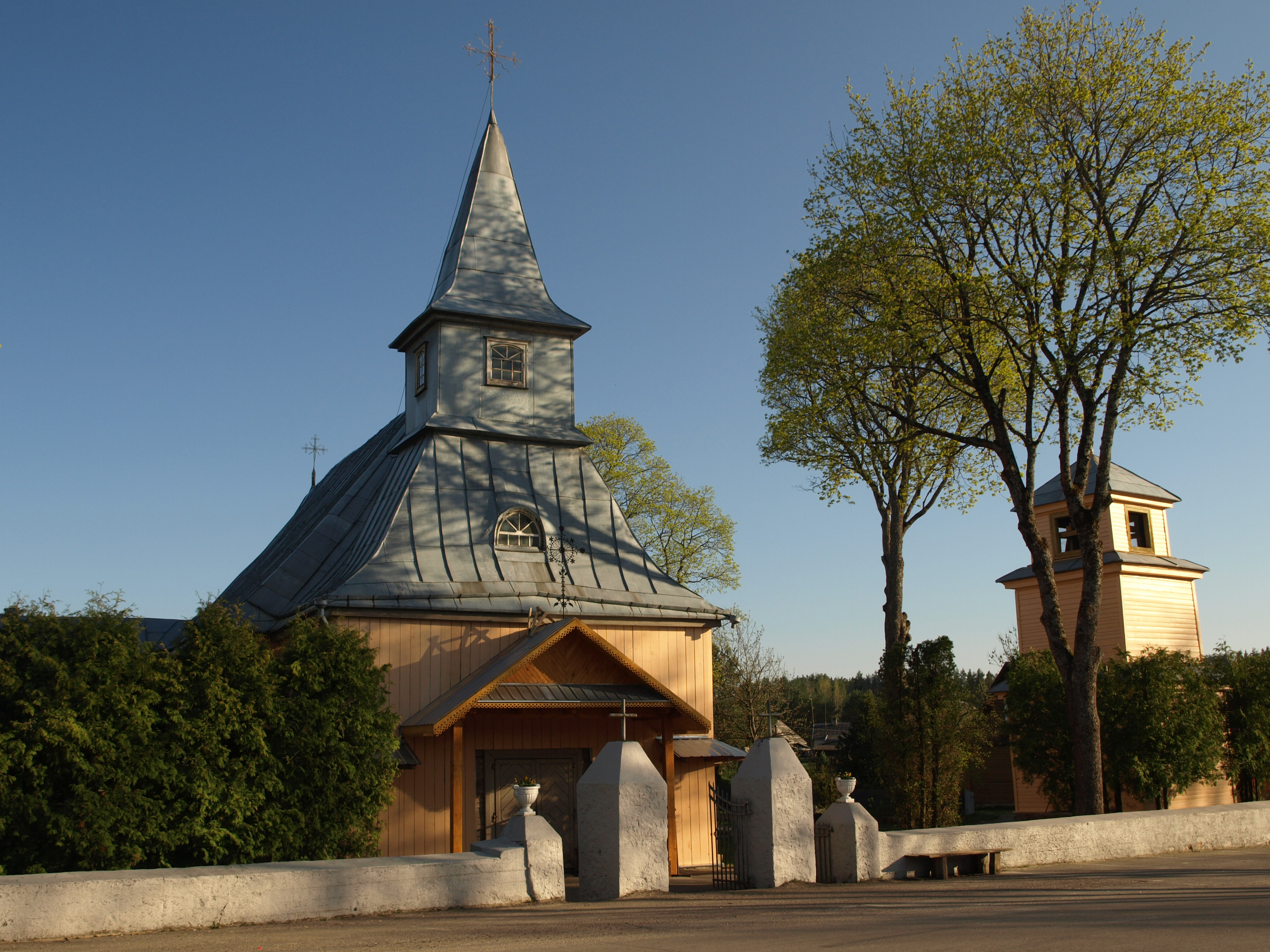
Ceikiniai church

Ceikiniai (Polish: Cejkinie) is a village in the Ignalina district municipality, Utena county, Lithuania. It is 12 kilometres southeast from Ignalina.

The village is situated at the confluence of Ceikinė and Kretuona. It is surrounded by pine forests and hills. Around 4 kilometres north of the town is the Nevaišiai hill, the fourth 4th tallest mountain in Lithuania.
