= Didžiasalis =

- Town
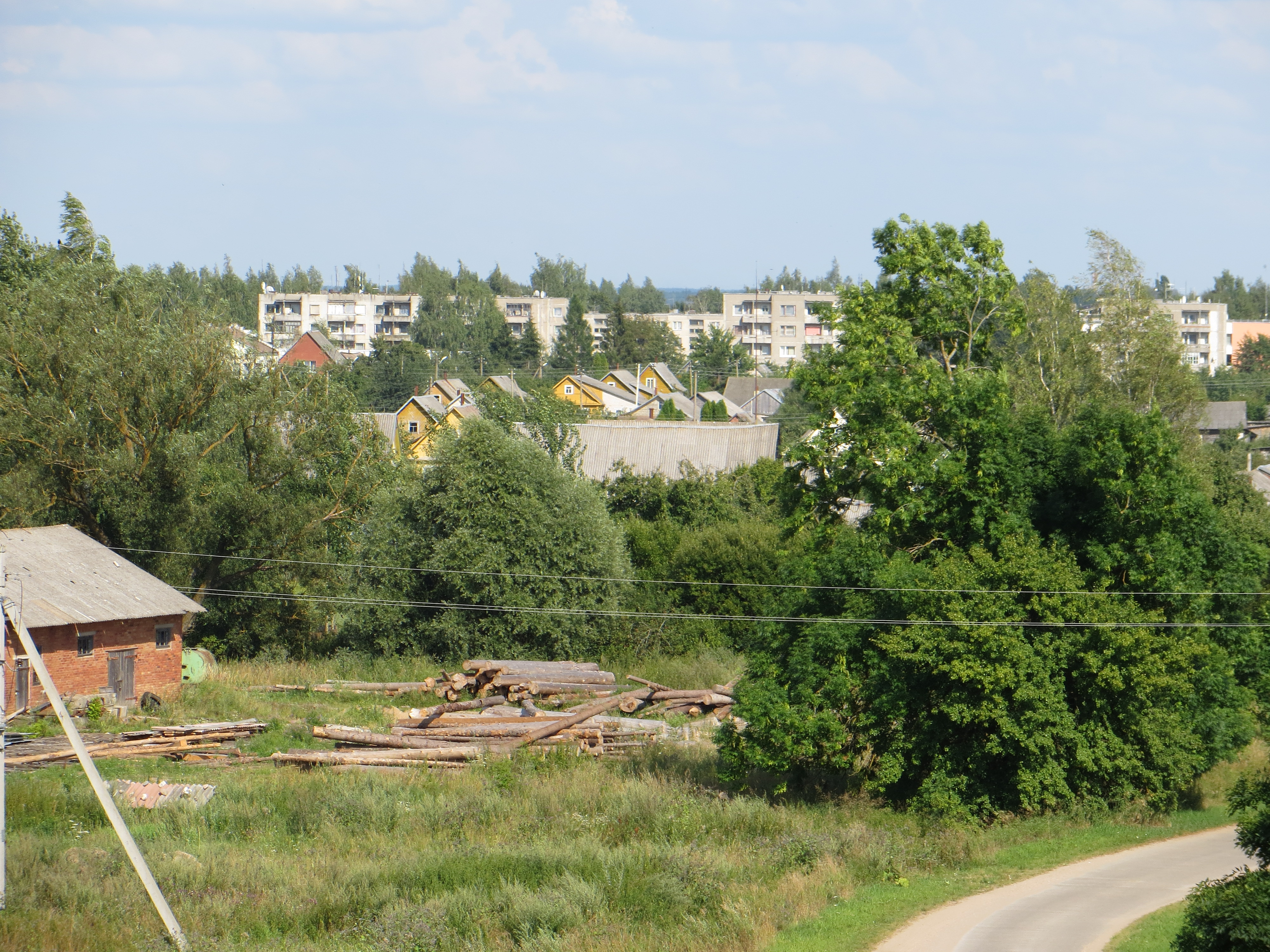
- Didžiasalis from western side

- Location in Lithuania
- Coordinates: 55°19′10″N 26°40′50″E
- Country: Lithuania
- County: Utena County
- Municipality: Ignalina district municipality
- Eldership: Didžiasalis eldership
- Capital of: Didžasalis eldership

Population (2021)
  - Total: 1,010
- Time zone: UTC+2 (EET)
  - Summer (DST): UTC+3 (EEST)

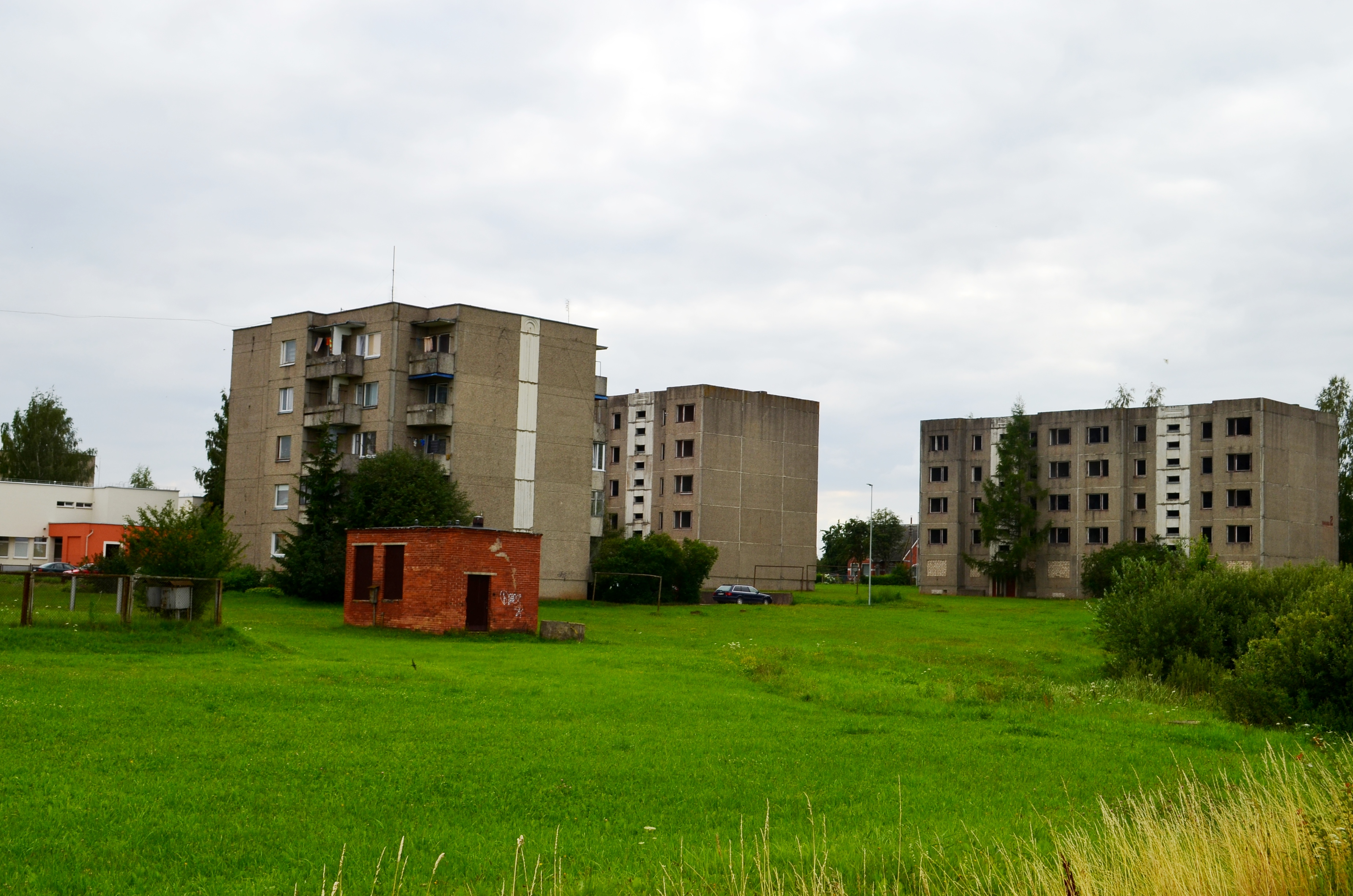
Abandoned apartment buildings (2018)

Didžiasalis is a town in Ignalina district municipality, in Utena County, North Eastern Lithuania. According to the 2011 census, the town has a population of 1299 people. The town is near the border with Belarus.

Due to the fall of Soviet Union the town lost its main industry and suffered significant population loss of 60%. Many Soviet built apartments were left empty. In 2019, Lithuanian National Television called this town Lithuanian Chernobyl.

== Demographics ==
Historical population

Year	Pop.	±%
1959	217	—
1979	1,982	+813.4%
1989	2,676	+35.0%

Year	Pop.	±%
2001	1,744	−34.8%
2011	1,299	−25.5%
2021	1,010	−22.2%

Source: 1959, 1979, 1989, 2011
