= Česlovas Kudaba =

Lithuanian politician

Česlovas Kudaba (24 July 1934 – 19 February 1993) was a Lithuanian politician, geographer, born in Kobylnik, Poland. In 1990 he was among those who signed the Act of the Re-Establishment of the State of Lithuania.
