= Lithuanian Museum of Ancient Beekeeping =

Coordinates: 55.409°N 25.945°E

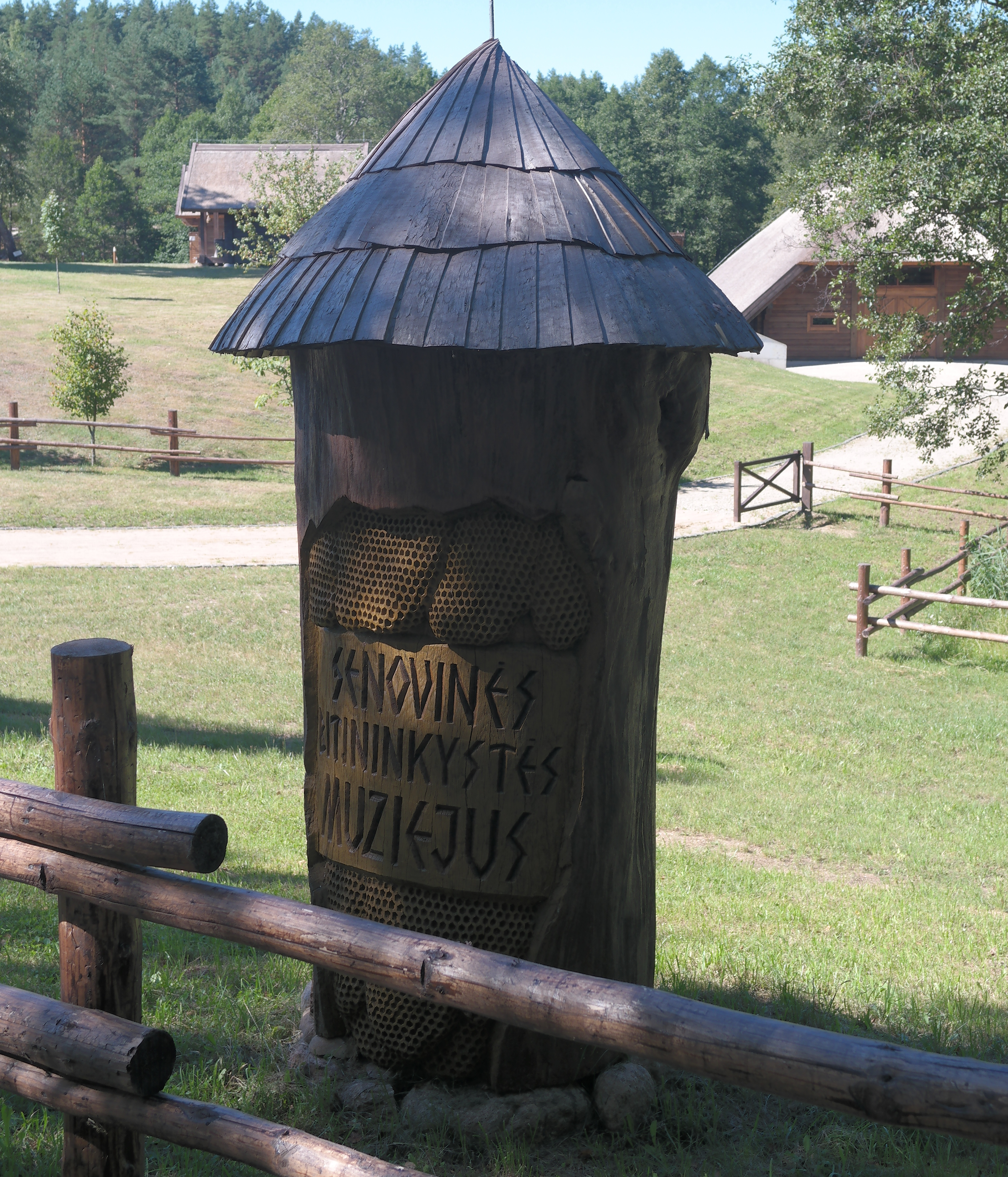
Lithuanian Museum of Ancient Beekeeping

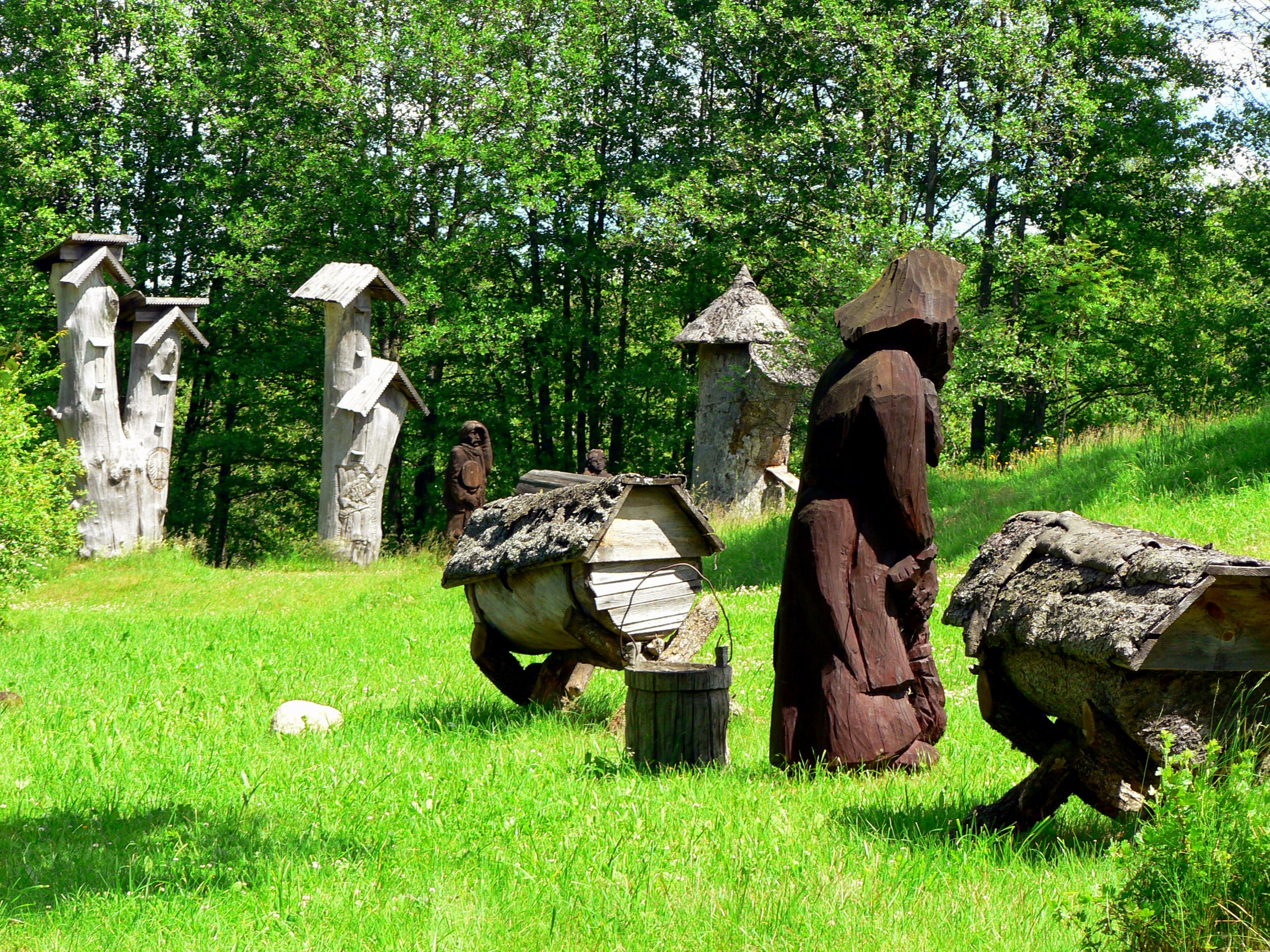
Sculptured hives at the museum

The Lithuanian Museum of Ancient Beekeeping (Lithuanian: Senovinės bitininkystės muziejus), established in 1984 near Stripeikiai in northeastern Lithuania, displays the history of beekeeping in the area. The museum, part of Aukštaitija National Park, was founded by the beekeeper Bronius Kazlas.

As of 2006, the museum consisted of six buildings, about 500 displays, and 25 sculptures. In addition to illustrating the history of beekeeping in Lithuania, some of the museum's wooden sculptures themselves contain beehives. The sculptures pay homage to the honeybee's place in worldwide mythology and folklore, including Egyptian and Native American figures as well as the Lithuanian god Babilas and goddess Austėja. They were carved by Teofilis Patiejūnas and Ipolitas Užkurnis.

The displays include glass-sided hives that enable visitors to watch the bees at work, tool collections, and illustrations of the role that bees play in pollination. The wide variety of hives includes many tree trunks, which were used from the 15th century until the beginning of the 20th century.

The Lithuanian Veterinary Academy claims that Lithuanian bees are especially peaceful. They constitute a sub-species of the European honey bee; they are smaller than Italian bees and larger than the Caucasian honey bee.

The honeybee is a symbol of friendship in Lithuania; the word bičiulis is an affectionate form of address. In 2005 Ukrainian President Viktor Yushchenko presented Lithuanian President Valdas Adamkus with three beehives and bees, which were brought to the museum.

The museum is open from May to October. A Honey Harvest festival is held in August, and the museum features a "Honey Bar".

The museum reopened in spring 2015 after reconstruction.
