= Ignalina District Municipality =

Ignalina District Municipality Ignalinos rajono savivaldybė
- District Municipality
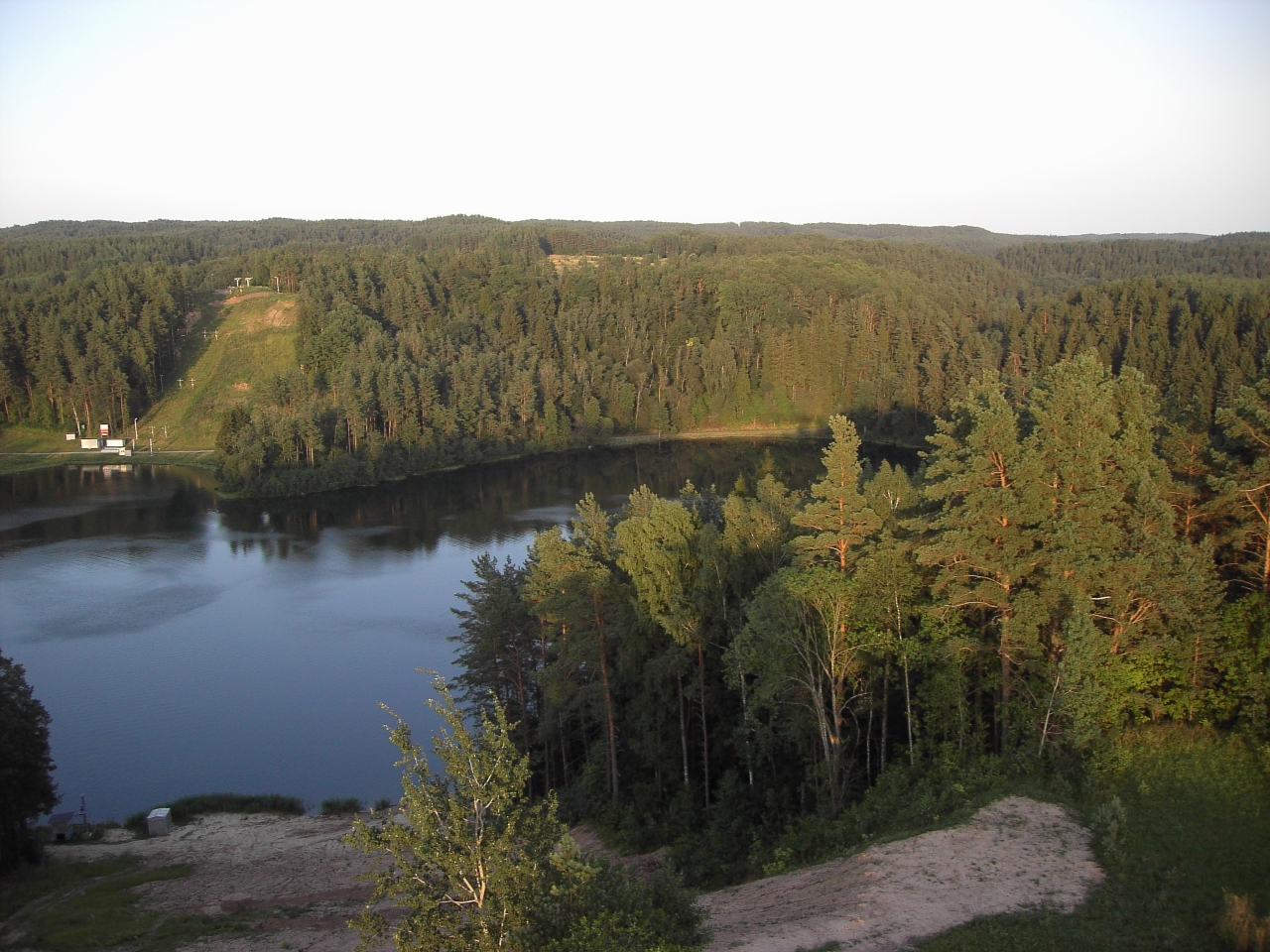
- Žaliasis lake

- Flag Coat of arms

- Location of Ignalina District Municipality within Lithuania

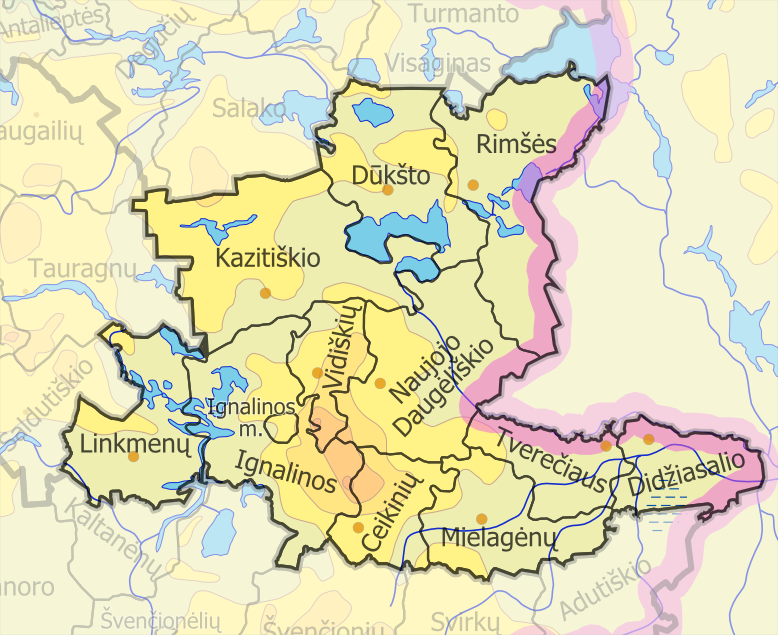
- Location of Ignalina
- Coordinates: 55°20′24″N 26°9′41″E
- Country: Lithuania
- Region: Aukštaitija
- County: Utena County
- Established: 1950 (76 years ago)
- Capital: Ignalina
- Elderships: 12

Government
  - Type: City Council
  - Body: Ignalina District Council
  - Mayor: Laimutis Ragaišis (LVŽS)
  - Leading: Farmers and Greens Union 10 / 21

Area
  - Total: 1,441 km^{2} (556 sq mi)
  - Rank: 18th

Population (2022)
  - Total: 14,283
  - Rank: 54th
  - Density: 9.91/km^{2} (25.7/sq mi)
  - Rank: 59th
- Time zone: UTC+2 (EET)
  - Summer (DST): UTC+3 (EEST)
- ZIP Codes: 30012–30620
- Phone code: +370 (386)
- Website: www.ignalina.lt

Ignalina District Municipality is one of 60 municipalities in Lithuania.

== Structure ==
District structure:

- 2 cities – Dūkštas and Ignalina;
- 3 towns – Mielagėnai, Rimšė and Tverečius;
- 726 villages.
- Ignalina District Municipality consists of 12 smaller administration units - elderships.

Population of largest Ignalina District Municipality elderships (2014-07-01):

- Ignalina town – 5605
- Didžiasalis – 1691
- Vidiškės – 1278
- Dūkštas – 1756
- Kazitiškis – 1039
- Naujasis Daugėliškis – 1491
- Mielagėnai – 887
- Ceikiniai – 533
- Linkmenys – 970
- Rimšė – 999
- Tverečius – 590

In total - 18414 inhabitants.

== Elderships ==
Ignalina District Municipality is divided into 12 elderships:

Eldership (Administrative Center)	Area	Population (2021)
Ceikiniai (Ceikiniai)	83 km^{2} (20,509.75 acres; 32.05 sq mi)	441
Didžiasalis (Didžiasalis)	82.2 km^{2} (20,312.06 acres; 31.74 sq mi)	1,222
Dūkštas (Dūkštas)	154 km^{2} (38,054.23 acres; 59.46 sq mi)	1,291
Ignalina City (Ignalina)	6.9 km^{2} (1,705.03 acres; 2.66 sq mi)	5,106
Ignalina (Ignalina)	262 km^{2} (64,741.61 acres; 101.16 sq mi)	1,380
Kazitiškis (Kazitiškis)	162 km^{2} (40,031.07 acres; 62.55 sq mi)	763
Linkmenys (Linkmenys)	96 km^{2} (23,722.12 acres; 37.07 sq mi)	763
Mielagėnai (Mielagėnai)	115 km^{2} (28,417.12 acres; 44.40 sq mi)	639
Naujasis Daugėliškis (Naujasis Daugėliškis)	160 km^{2} (39,536.86 acres; 61.78 sq mi)	1,072
Rimšė (Rimšė)	98 km^{2} (24,216.33 acres; 37.84 sq mi)	624
Tverečius (Tverečius)	79 km^{2} (19,521.33 acres; 30.50 sq mi)	382
Vidiškės (Vidiškės)	62 km^{2} (15,320.53 acres; 23.94 sq mi)	1,099

== Nature and geography ==
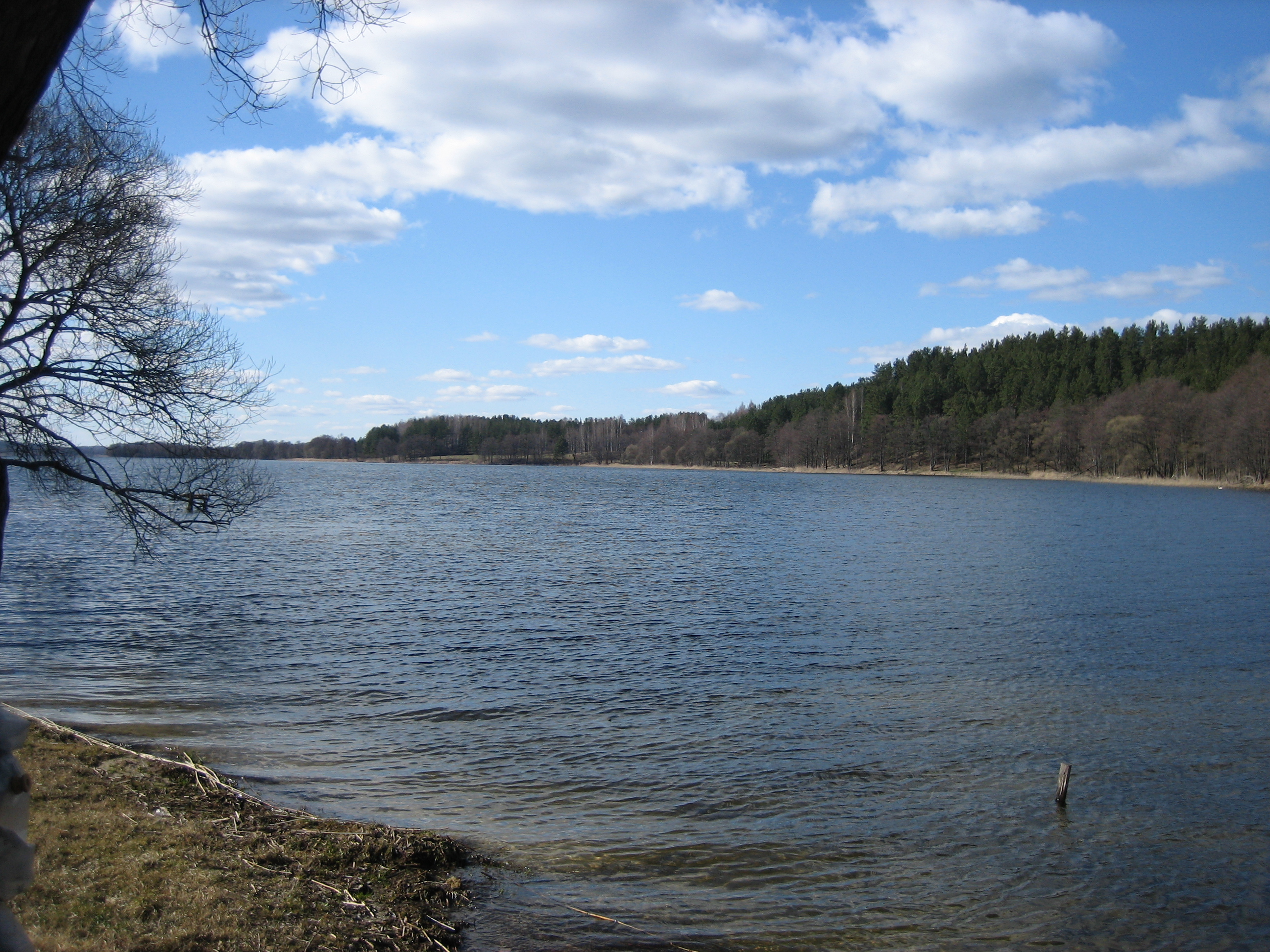
Lūšiai

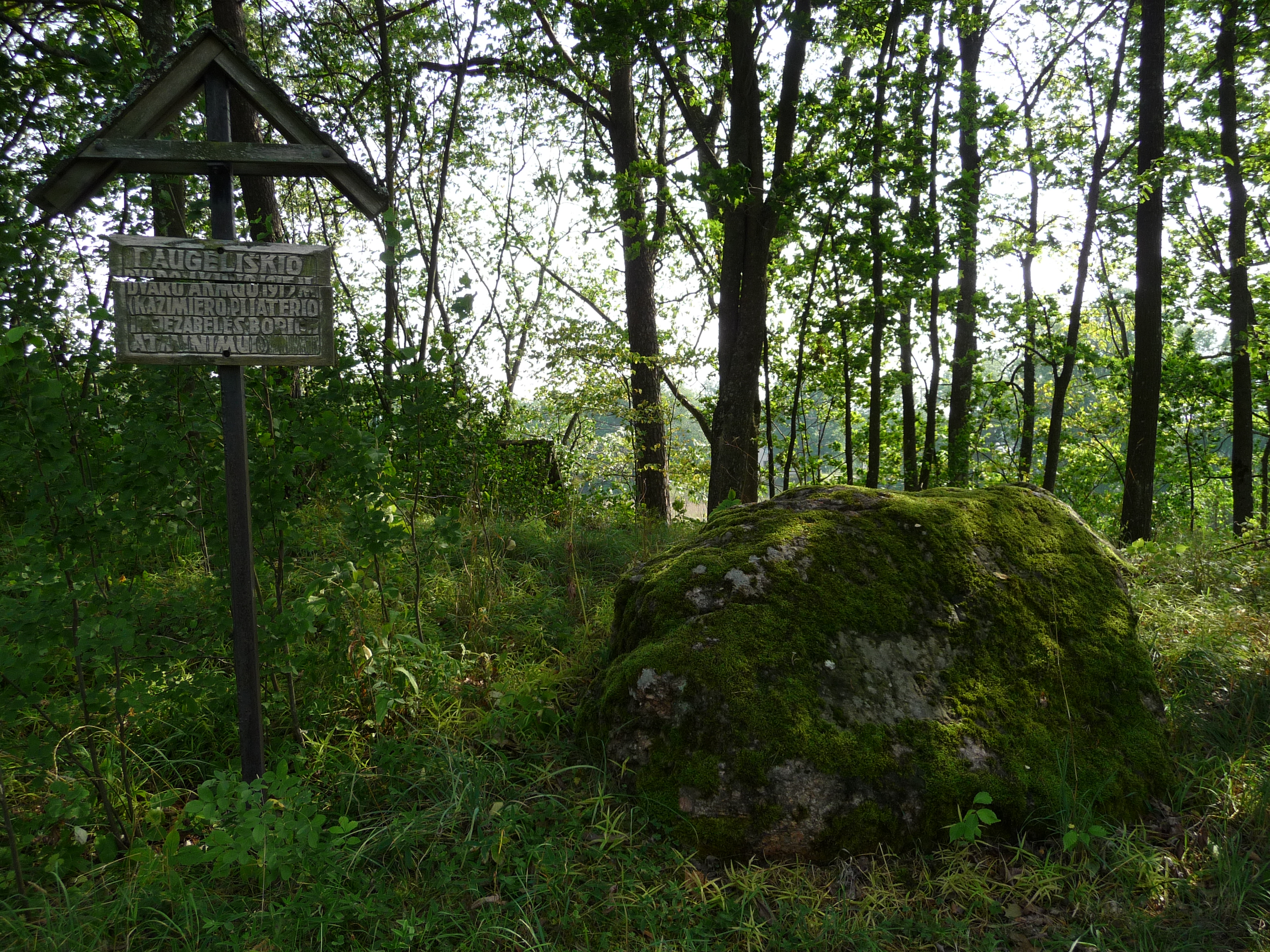
Rock of Pliateriai

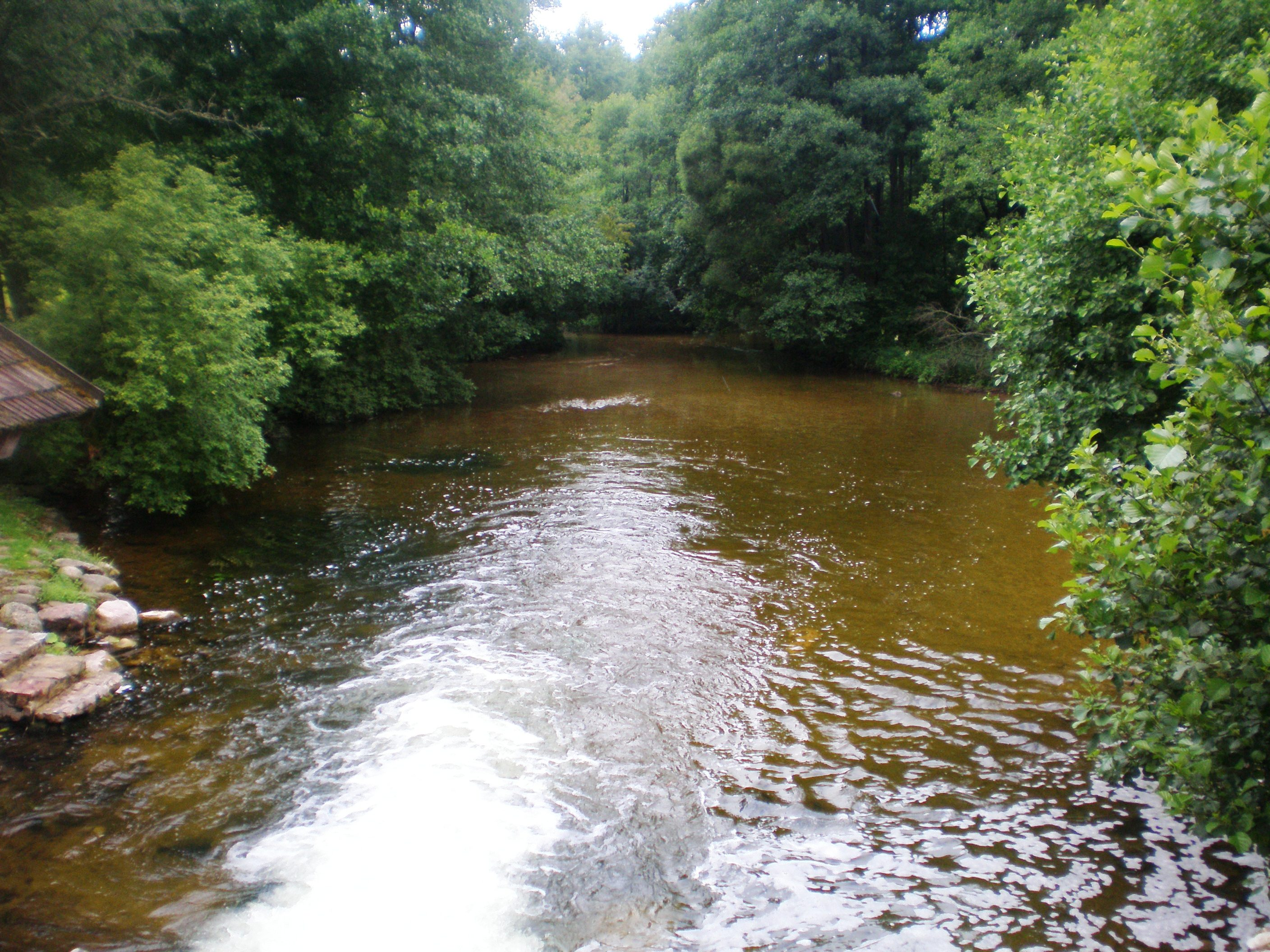
The Srovė river

== See also ==
- Aukštaitija National Park
