= Utena County =

County of Lithuania

Coordinates: 55°30′01″N 25°36′32″E

Utena County Utenos apskritis
- County
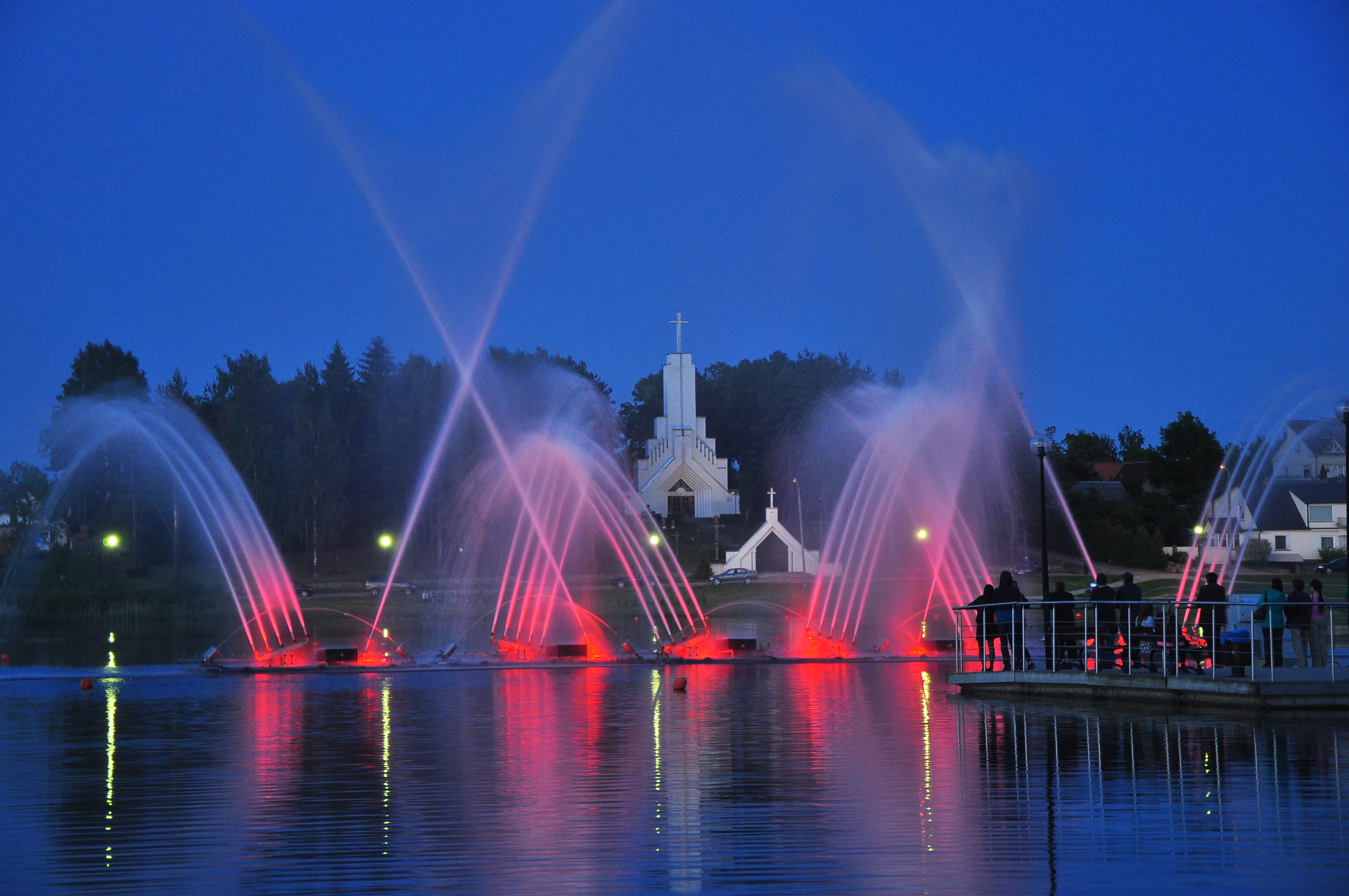
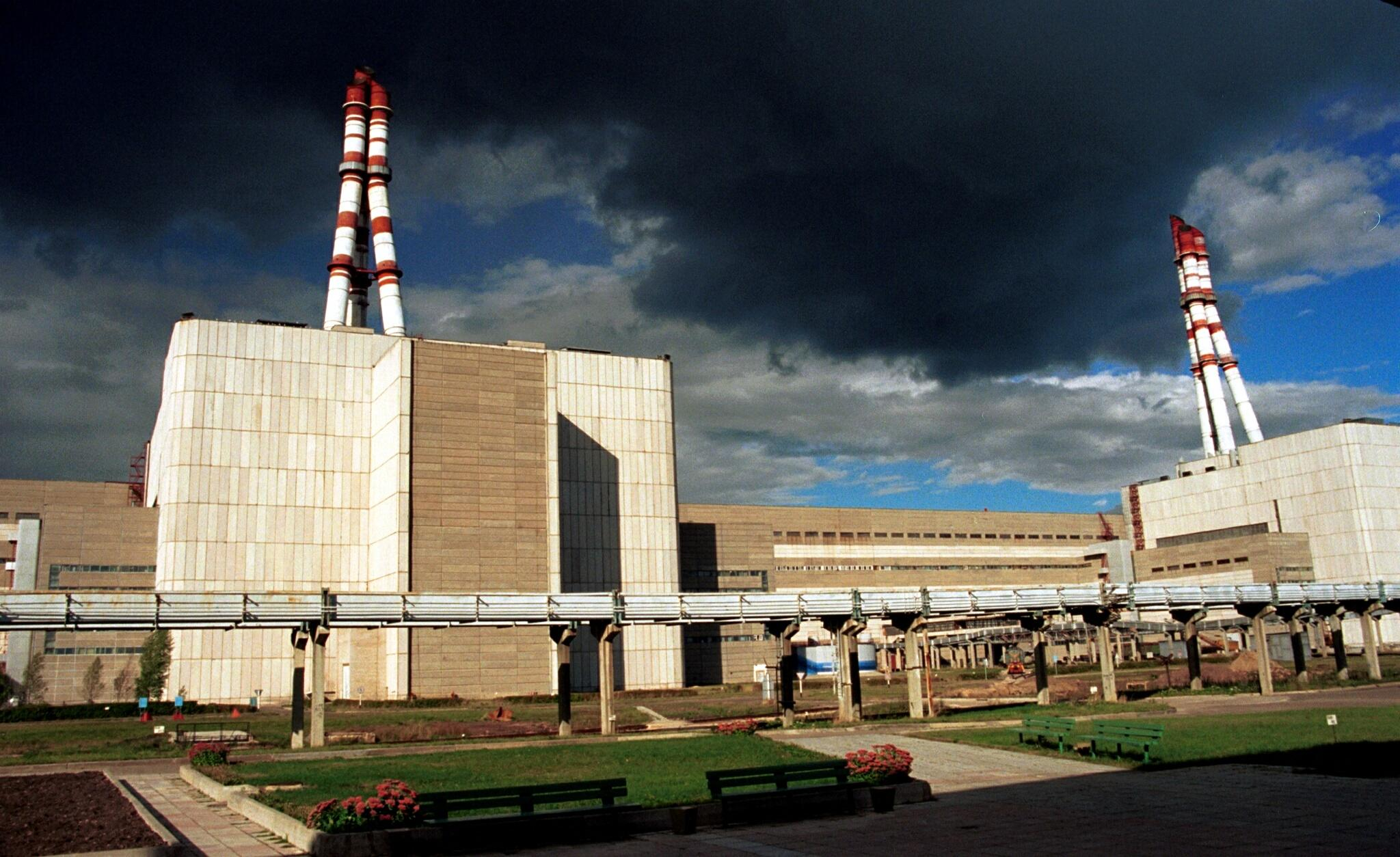
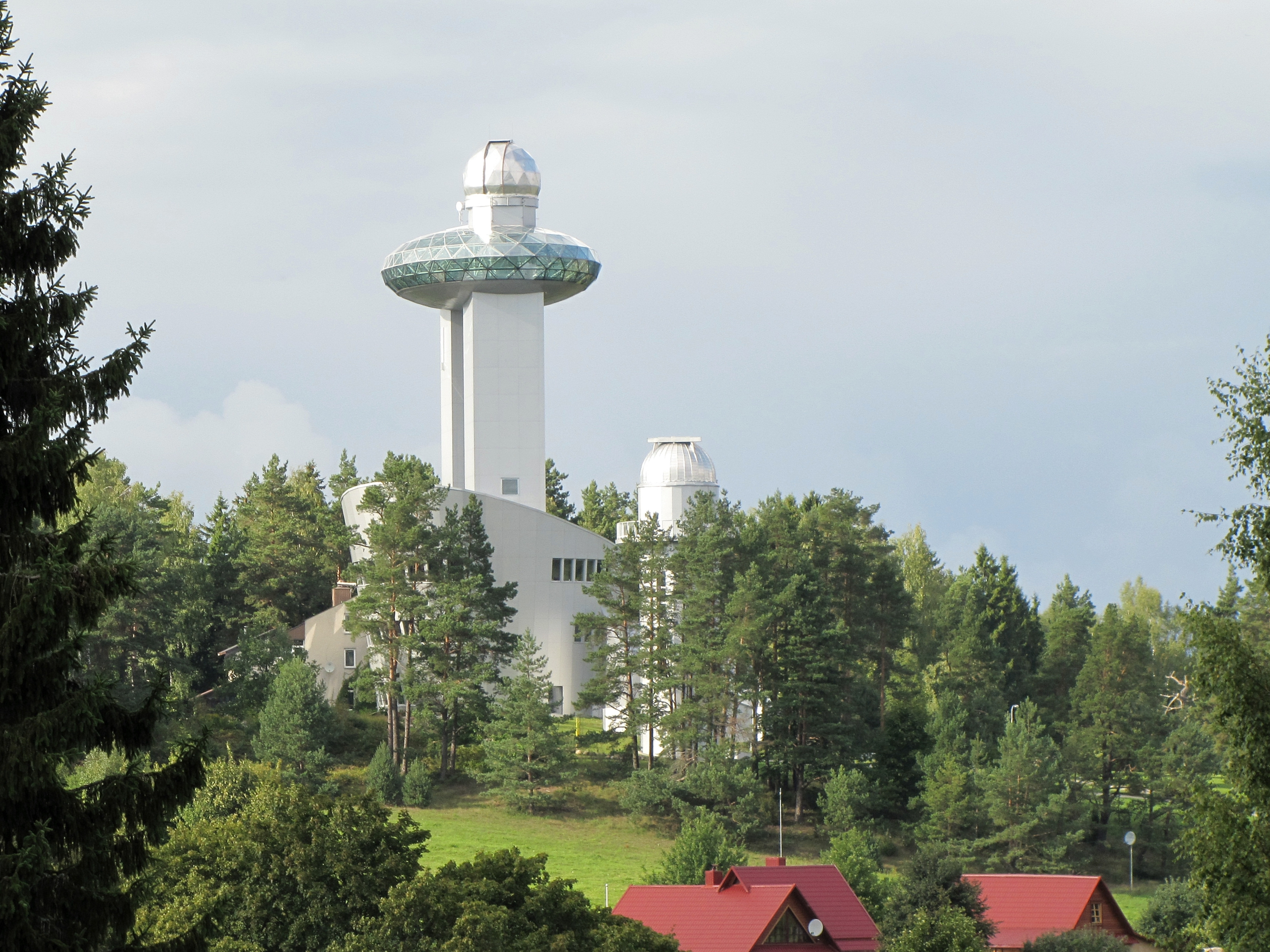
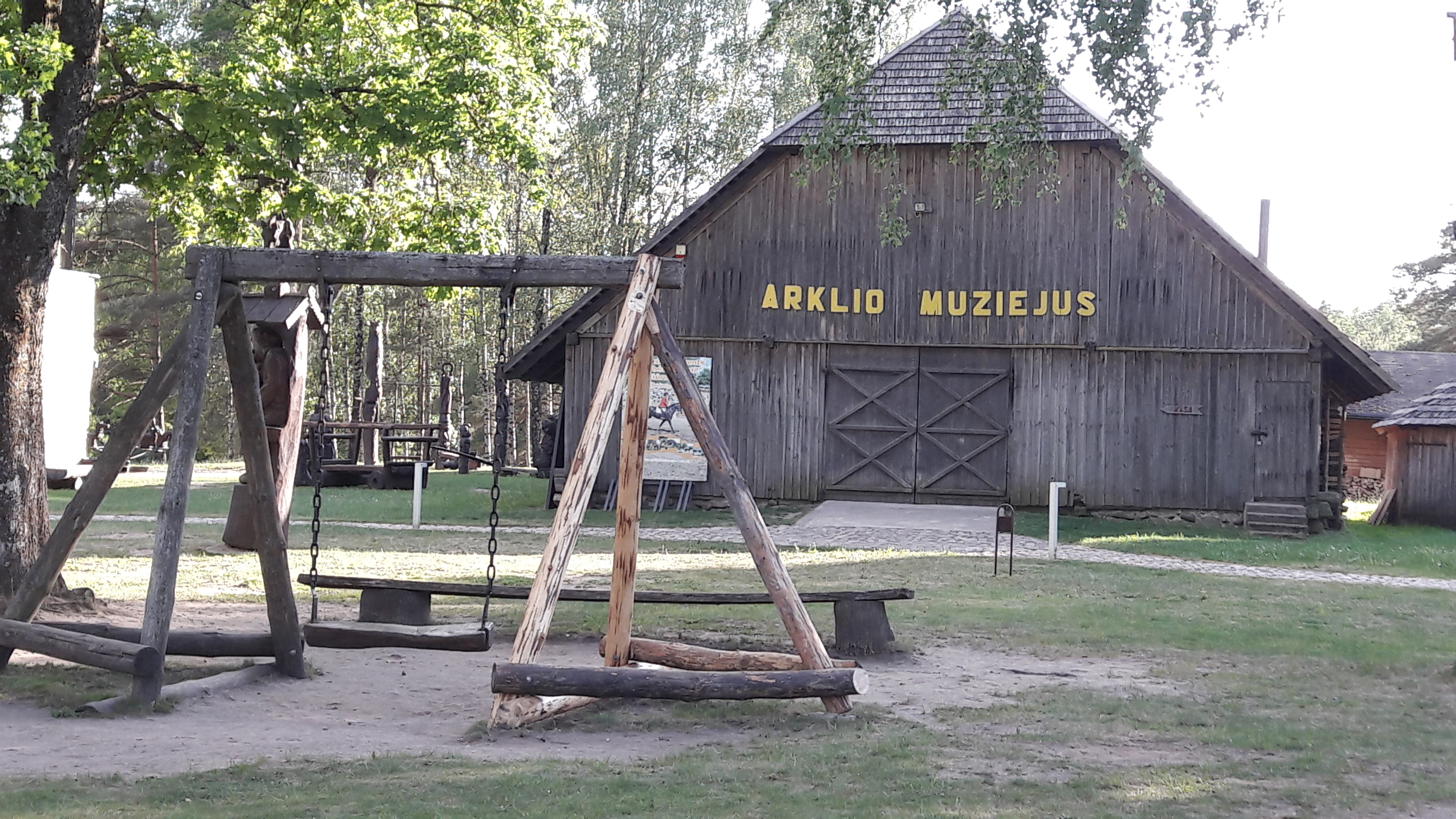
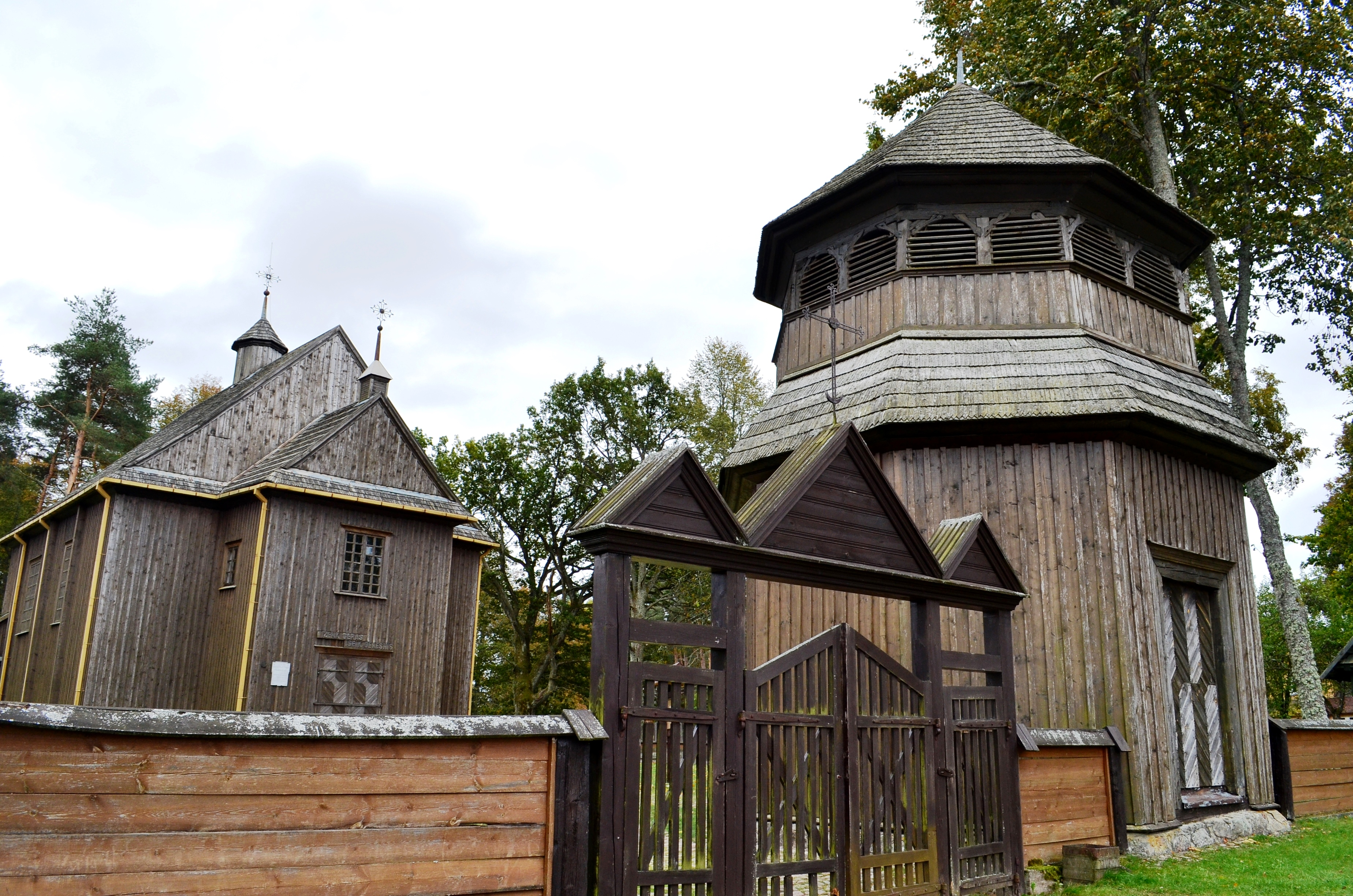
- From the top to bottom-right:Musical fountains in Utena, Ignalina Nuclear Power Plant, Lithuanian Museum of Ethnocosmology, Lithuanian Horse Museum, Wooden church in Palūšė-Aukštaitija National Park

- Flag Coat of arms

- Location of Utena County
- Country: Lithuania
- Administrative centre: Utena
- Municipalities: List: Anykščiai district municipality; Ignalina district municipality; Molėtai district municipality; Utena district municipality; Visaginas municipality; Zarasai district municipality

Area
  - Total: 7,191 km^{2} (2,776 sq mi)
- (11% of the area of Lithuania)

Population (2021-10-12)
  - Total: 130,613
  - Rank: 8th of 10 (6.0% of the population of Lithuania)
  - Density: 18.16/km^{2} (47.04/sq mi)

GDP
  - Total: €1.8 billion (2023) · 9th
- Time zone: UTC+2 (EET)
  - Summer (DST): UTC+3 (EEST)
- ISO 3166 code: LT-UT
- HDI (2022): 0.837 very high · 8th

Utena County (Lithuanian: Utenos Apskritis) is one of ten counties in Lithuania. It is the country's most sparsely populated county. The capital and the largest city in the county is Utena, which is 95 km (59 mi) from Vilnius, the capital of Lithuania. On 1 July 2010, the county administration was abolished. Since that date, Utena County remains as a territorial and statistical unit. It borders Latvia and Belarus.

== History ==
Utena is one of the oldest settlements in Lithuania and is mentioned in historical chronicles as early as in 1261.

== Municipalities ==
It is divided into six municipalities:

Anykščiai District Municipality
Ignalina District Municipality
Molėtai District Municipality
Utena District Municipality
Visaginas Municipality
Zarasai District Municipality

== Economy ==
The county has a well-developed network of roads. Main branches of economy are textile, food and timber processing, beer and wine production, power engineering.

== Tourism ==
Utena County is the second most popular tourism destination in Lithuania (after the seaside). Approximately 31% of territory is covered with forests. There are 1002 lakes in the county. They are connected by rivers and provide good opportunities for water tourism. One of the biggest tourism attractions is Aukštaitija National Park. In addition, the county has six other regional parks. There are a number of unique places of interest that can be found only in Utena county, e.g., Asveja, the longest lake in Lithuania and Lake Tauragnas, the deepest one; Horse Museum, Lithuanian Museum of Ancient Beekeeping, Lithuanian Museum of Ethnocosmology, narrow gauge railway, a burial mound exposition, an exhibition of stone dust pictures.
