= Kurkliai–Panevėžys offensive =

- Part of Lithuanian–Soviet War
| Date | 1919 May 18–23 |
| Location | Western Aukštaitija, Lithuania |
| Result | Lithuanian victory |

Belligerents
| Lithuania | Russian SFSR |

The Kurkliai–Panevėžys offensive (Lithuanian: Kurklių–Panevėžio operacija) was one of the first offensive operations planned by the military command of the Lithuanian Armed Forces in the Lithuanian–Soviet War, carried out on May 18–23, 1919. Part of the Lithuanian Wars of Independence.

== Preparation ==
In mid-May 1919, the Red Army in Lithuania, consisting of the:

- Pskov ("Lithuanian") Rifle Division's 1st, 2nd, 3rd, 4th, and 7th Regiments,
- 2nd Latvian International Division's 12th, 14th, 15th, 17th, and 31st Regiments,

had occupied the line Molėtai–Želva–Balninkai–Žemaitkiemis–Kavarskas–Raguva–Upytė–Pumpėnai–Pasvalys–Saločiai.

Locations after which the offensive is named

Lithuanian Army concentration until May 13
Red Army positions in mid-May, before the Lithuanian offensive
Red Army positions on May 23, after the successful Lithuanian attack

The operation was prepared by the Commander-in-Chief of the Lithuanian Army (equivalent to the modern Chief of Defence), General Silvestras Žukauskas, and the General Staff of the Lithuanian Army.

=== Ukmergė Group ===
According to the prepared operation plan, the Ukmergė Group was formed, which was led by Kazys Ladiga and included:

- 1st Infantry Regiment
- Saxon volunteer battalion
- 1½ squadron from the 1st Hussar Regiment
- 4th Artillery Battery (2 cannons)

=== Panevėžys Group ===
The second, Panevėžys Group, consisted of:

- 2nd Infantry Regiment
- Separate Panevėžys Battalion
- Marijampolė Battalion
- 1st Artillery Battery (4 cannons)

Jonas Variakojis was appointed as the group's commander, later he was replaced by Maksimas Katche, Vincas Grigaliūnas-Glovackis, and Stasys Nastopka.

Lithuanian army units were concentrated until May 13, 1919 in the sector Širvintos–Lyduokiai–Vidiškiai–Taujėnai–Ramygala–Krekenava–Šeduva–Pušalotas–Joniškėlis.

== Operation ==
The operation began at dawn on May 18, 1919. The Ukmergė Group marched in three columns from positions near Vidiškės. The middle column attacked on both sides of the Ukmerge–Utena highway and liberated Kurkliai on the same day. The left column of the detachment, which began its attack from Taujėnai, liberated Kavarskas. The right column liberated Balninkai. German units marched only as far as Virinta, while Lithuanian units were directed north, towards Anykščiai, Andrioniškis and Viešintos.

On May 18, the Panevėžys Group, also concentrated near Ramygala and Krekenava, also launched an attack with three columns. Its attack was led by M. Katche and J. Variakojis. Supported by the Lithuanian Air Force, it liberated Panevėžys on May 19. On May 19, the Ukmergė detachment liberated Anykščiai, Alanta and Skiemonys, and on May 20 – Andrioniškis. On May 22–23, the group's attack stalled because the expected support of Saxon volunteers was not forthcoming.

The Red Army units, having gathered reinforcements, counterattacked the Panevėžys Group on May 21 and forced it to withdraw from Panevėžys. The Lithuanian units were regrouped to attack the city from the southeast. And only the active actions of the Joniškėlis partisans, when they liberated several towns in Northern Lithuania, and the emerging threat of encirclement frightened the Red Army command. On the night of May 22–23, their units retreated from Panevėžys and its surroundings towards Subačius. On May 23, Panevėžys was again liberated by the Lithuanians.

During the Kurkliai–Panevėžys operation, the Lithuanian army, with several times smaller forces, liberated a significant part of the territory of Lithuania. While liberating Panevėžys alone, it took about 400 prisoners, 1 military train, 2 guns, and 16 machine guns. The Red Army units retreated and concentrated on the Pakalniai–Leliūnai–Debeikiai–Svėdasai–Kupiškis–Vabalninkas line.

A few days later, they were forced to withdraw from there as well by the Kupiškis–Utena offensive launched by the Lithuanian army.

== Sources ==
- Lesčius, Vytautas (2007). "Kurklių-Panevėžio operacija". Visuotinė lietuvių enciklopedija (in Lithuanian). Vol. XI (Kremacija-Lenzo taisyklė). Vilnius: Mokslo ir enciklopedijų leidybos institutas.
