= History of the Jews of Kupiskis =

History of the Kupiskis Jewish community

Kupiskis קופישוק
- Shtetl
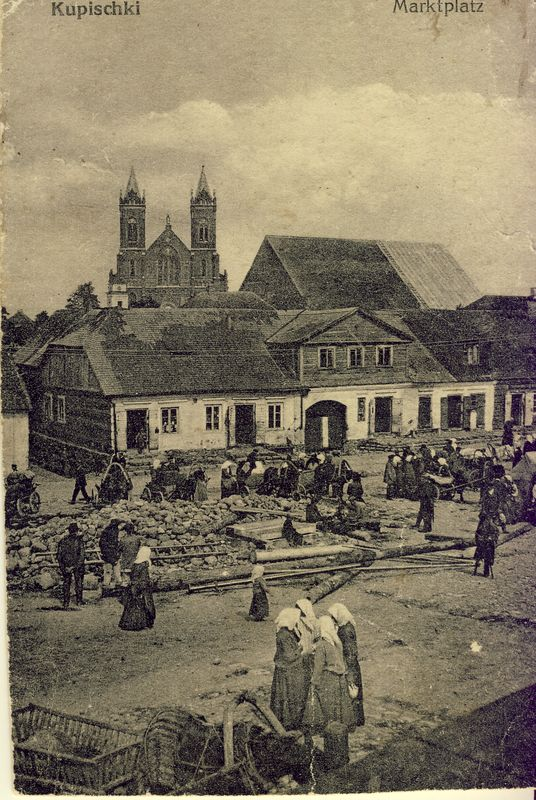
- Kupiskis market square in 1918
- Country: Lithuania
- Governate: Kovno
- County: Panevėžys
- District Municipality: Kupiskis
- First recorded: 1596

Population (1897)
  - Total: 2,661
- Demonym: Kupishoker
- Website: https://kehilalinks.jewishgen.org/kupiskis/kupishok.htm

Kupiškis, known in Yiddish as Kupishok is a shtetl in northeastern Lithuania that was home to a substantial Jewish community. The population peaked at 71% of the town with 2661 residents in 1897 before mass groups of people began immigrating away from Kupiskis at the turn of the 20th century. The remaining population was murdered in the Holocaust in the summer of 1941.

== Origins ==
The earliest documented record of Jewish inhabitants in Kupiskis, is likely be a complaint from Samuelis and Danielis Charunickiai dating to 23 December 1596; in it, it states that Mr Kaptis had borrowed a green chest from them and had not returned it. On the 1667 hearth tax there Jewish households were mentioned, but it was not until 1682 that permission from Bishop Mikalojus Pacas was granted for the Jewish inhabitants of Kupiskis to be able to construct a synagogue. The Great Synagogue, built out of stone, was then first recorded in a church inventory of 1721 by the local parish priest, Petras Kazimieras Roniska. The redbrick portion was used by the Misnadgim and during the Soviet period it was the "culture house" and now functions as the boiler room for the original part of the synagogue which is now the library.

On the 1711 revision list for Kupiskis, conducted following the devastation of the Great Northern War and famine, 20 Jewish households are recorded with each household recorded with their head of house. By the inventory of 1726, this figure had increased to 39 households making up 48% of recorded households. In 1765, 53 Jewish households were recorded with a total of 413 people; by the 1784 revision list there were 105 families from 367 individuals. A large fire destroyed much of the town on 14 August 1791 which destroyed 40 Jewish houses, eight Jewish distilleries and much more such as the Catholic church.

The Great Synagogue, now the Kupiskis library

== Kupiskis Jewish Cemetery ==
Kupiskis Jewish Cemetery
- קופּישאָקער בית־עולם
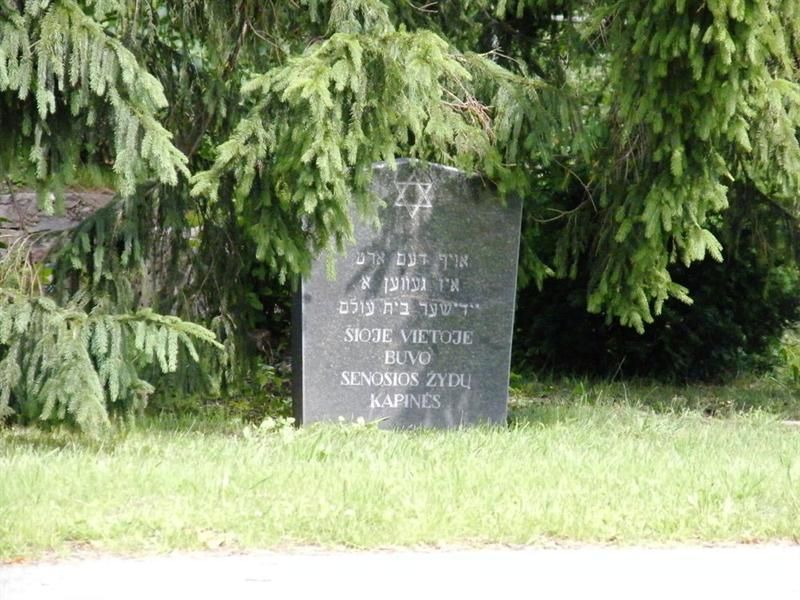
- Memorial stone for the cemetery

Details
- Established: 17th century
- Abandoned: 1941
- Location: Kupiskis
- Country: Lithuania
- Type: Jewish
- Website: Kupiskis Old Jewish Cemetery

The Old Jewish Cemetery in Kupiskis was being used during the 17th century due to it containing 17th century tombstones. A second Jewish Cemetery was opened in the 19th century due to the Old Cemetery running out of space. The cemetery remained undisturbed during World War Two but was destroyed during the 1970s by the Soviets. As of present, only 15 stones remain out of the once hundreds dating to between 1864 and 1919 which have all been transcribed and recorded.

Civil records for deaths only began in 1871 as part of Russian civil records before the Lithuanian civil records began in 1922; deaths are recorded in the Revision lists of 1816 and 1858. Between revisions, a total of 17 Jews were recorded to have died and 48 ran away between the 1811 and 1816 revision list; a further 61 Jews died, 5 were conscripted and 25 left for unknown reasons between the 1850/51 and 1858 revision lists.

== Russian Imperial rule ==
During this time, Kupiskis entered the Pale of Settlement, the 1816 revision list records 450 individuals across 144 households. Whereas during the 1700s where the majority of Jews were farmers growing vegetables, during Russian rule, many worked as small traders within the flax and linen industries. As such, by the 1830s Jews owned 71 farms in Kupiskis. Devastating fire ripped through Kupiskis in 1868, 1876 and 1895. The community had split into two groups, the Hasidim and the Misnagdim each with their own rabbi, ritual slaughterer, burial society and in total four synagogues. In 1882, the community gained a doctor who charged 50 kopeks to the rich, 30 to the middle class and free to the poor, the rent of the doctor was paid for by the community. Towards the end of the 19th century, many Jews began immigrating to places such as the United States, United Kingdom or elsewhere; many returned after gaining money but later left for South Africa. Back to back fires in 1895 destroyed many Jewish houses.

== Interwar period ==
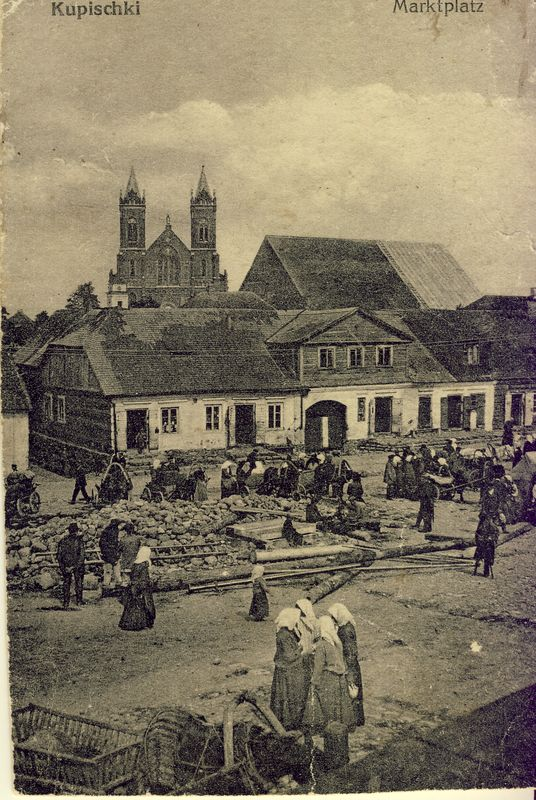
Kupiškis Market Square in 1918

In the early 20th century, there were two schools teaching in Hebrew and one that taught in Yiddish; in addition there was a yeshiva, kindergarten and library. However, when German soldiers marched on Kupiskis in 1915, many of the Kupiskis Jews fled either to Vilna or the Russian interior, returning only after the war. After Lithuania gained independence in 1918, Jewish life flourished as it did pre-war. A plethora of Jewish-led organisations were set up in welfare, education and politics such as the Kupiškis Support Committee for the Jewish refugees or the The Lithuanian Jewish Education Society which ran from 1925 to its ban in 1940. The Jewish bank or Folks bank in Kupiskis was supported by the Kupishokers abroad and in 1929, 369 people had accounts in it. Even in 1931, when the director of the bank, embezzled all of the funds and fled Lithuania, the community and relatives abroad worked together and covered the losses.

One of the Kupiskis families, the Trapidos, possessed with them a large leather bound book containing the history of the Trapido family going back to their expulsion from the Iberian Peninsula. The book was destroyed in anti Jewish pogroms in 1922. In 1931, the newspaper Funken covered the 108 year old caretaker of the synagogue who each shabbat would stand on the bemah and either bang his fist on the table or shout "Sha!", causing the walls and windows to shake.

== The Holocaust ==
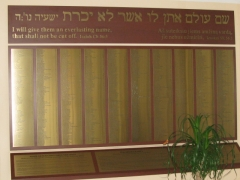
Memorial to the Jews who died in the Holocaust

The Soviets occupied the town on 15 June 1940 as they annexed Lithuania into the Soviet Union. Sovietization followed as businesses were nationalised and the October Revolution was celebrated. The German army entered Kupiskis on 26 June 1941 along with fleeing Jews from towns such as Panevezys, Viesintos and Subacius. That same day, 40 families managed to escape to the Russian interior and many others fled to nearby villages where they were sheltered by Christians; when the Germans then took over those towns, they were soon found. Initially following the invasion, a small resistance group of Jewish youth wounded two members of a Lithuanian nationalist gang.

During July 1941, the Jews were forced into a ghetto, which was only a small number of houses on Vilna Street as well as a large storeroom. Living conditions were intolerable with them being denied food and water; many women and children were abused by their neighbouring Lithuanians. A teacher, Werner Loew, at the local Lithuanian high school supplied a list to the Germans that contained names of Jews in the town; he was a Nazi agent planted there before the invasion and would become the self-appointed commandant of the town. That led to 35 Jews along with some communists and members of the Komsomol (78 in total) being arrested and imprisoned before being shot on 28 June 1941 behind the railway station. A large group of Jews was taken in July 1941 and shot in the forests surrounding Kupiskis, being buried in mass graves. Early in August 1941, a second and larger group of Jews were taken out and shot. Many were buried in mass graves behind the church and others in mass graves within the Jewish cemetery. Between the high school and barracks all remaining Jews were executed.

As well as the Nazi agent, the executions themselves were carried out by Lithuanians, with the local police chief and his deputy playing a large part in it. A local teacher and high school students informed the Nazi agent of any Jews hiding within the village and so by September 1941, no Jews remained in Kupiskis. In total over 3200 Jews were killed in Kupiskis over the summer of 1941. Many from nearby towns such as Palevene, Simonys, Viesintos, and some from Subacius. Many communists also were killed but not a single Kupishoker Jew who remained in Kupiskis survived the war, yet despite this, the Nazi agent was tried later but was ultimately released and moved to Germany under a pseudonym.

There are three mass graves for the Jews killed in Kupiskis:

- One on Gedimino Street, near the freethinkers cemetery with approximately 1000 buried there.
- A second in the Jewish cemetery on the banks of the Kupe River where 2700 are buried.
- A third in the Slavcinskis forest, one kilometer from the railway station where the 78 who had been murdered on 28 June 1941 were buried.

The local priest, I. Regauskas, attempted to save some of the Jews by hiding four of them with false identity papers. However he was informed upon. In the local village of Smilga, a peasant hid three escapees from the Kovno Ghetto in his granary. The Lithuanian doctor attempted to hide the rabbi's wife and children but within a short time they were all found and murdered. Any of the Jews who fled elsewhere in Lithuania met the same fate as those who stayed with the only survivors being those who escaped to the Russian interior and a handful in the Kovno ghetto.

In the aftermath of the war, Christian midwives from the Jewish Hospital in Panevezys compiled a list of more than 800 names of the murdered Jews. This was compiled onto a memorial plaque located in the Kupiskis library. Many Jews who escaped never returned and by 1959, only four Jews lived in Kupiskis. As of today, there is no Jewish community in Kupiskis.

== Residents ==
=== Demographics ===
Population of Kupiskis
Date	Population	Number of Households	Percentage
1711		20	
1726		39	48%
1765	413	53	
1784	367	105	
1816	450	144	30%
1842		101	44%
1847	1350		
1858	1038		
1897	2661		71%
1919	2268		
1923	1444		54%
1938	1200		42%
1939		400	
1941	1500		
1959	4		

=== Rabbis ===
The Rabbis of Kupiskis were:

- Rabbi Itzhak Trivash, born around the turn of the 17th century as the son of the Chief Rabbi of Frankfurt, Rabbi Shnier, brother of Rabbi Shimen and grandfather of Rabbi David Ber Yehuda, the author of the Golden Crown and New Song. David became a judge in Vilna and died there in 1804.
- Rabbi Szmuylowicz, rabbi in 1784.
- Rabbi Moshe Eliezer Ber Zinvil (Levi), author of House of Levite and Torah of the House, former resident of Shavel and was referred to as Reb Leiser from Kupishok, served until 1815.
- Rabbi Shmuel bar Chaim, rabbi of Svadotsh, Utian, and Kupishok, until his death around 1822.
- Rabbi Meir bar Abraham Segal Epstein, rabbi from 1833 to 1837. After Kupiskis, he served in the rabbinate of Vilna where he died in 1851 aged 71. Author of Interpretations of the Shas and Midrash Konin. His son, Rabbi Shmuel, served in Kosova and Kobryn.
- Rabbi Alexander Sender HaCohen Kaplan, previously the rabbi of Vilkomir and then from 1839 until his death in 1884, he was the rabbi of Kupishok. He was the author of The Vows of Sholom in 1841 and his rabbinical discussions appeared in the The Crown of Itzhak. Works of his are included in The Admiration of Saul and The Assembly of Itzhak.
- Orel Kasel, rabbi from 1875 to 1884.
- Rabbi Abel Yaakov Borochov, (1848-1938), sound of Mikhel, rabbi in Mayshegole, Kupiskis from 1884 to 1890 Vekshne, Polosk and Volkovisk. Later became Rabbi in the Lovers of Zion in Jerusalem in 1938. Author of The Rope of Jacob.
- Rabbi Israel ben Rafal Zeligman, rabbi from 1885 to 1890.
- Rabbi Yehuda-Leib Shalom Tzinabel, rabbi in 1890.Former Rabbi of Rubinishok and Ostrof.
- M L Berzon, rabbi from February 1891 to May 1897.
- David Peres, rabbi from June 1897 to after 1914.
- Rabbi Abraham Tzvi bar Moshe Brodneh, (b. 1850), in 1893 he was the rabbi of the Kupiskis Hassadim but not of the Mishnadgim. Author of The Blessing of Abraham, The Life of Moses, The Abbreviation of Tanya, The Protectors of Abraham and The Righteous of Abraham.
- Rabbi Yehuda-Leib Fein (1871-1941), rabbi in Pyasochnaye and Kupiskis from 1900 to 1906. After he served in Ashmyany and Slonim.
- Rabbi Eliahu Meyer Feivelson, (1867-1928), initially rabbi in Krakow and then Kupiskis from 1907. Active member of Agudat Yisrael and a fanatic anti-Zionist; author of many articles explaining the Torah such as The Gates of Zion, The Greatness of the Torah, The Announcer, The Level, Lebanon, The Jews, The Nation. He also wrote the parts of many books such as The Life and Peace, The Truth, Peace in Internal Israel, and also in Life Saving.
- Rabbi Yisrael-Noah Chatzekevitz, (1889-1941), Hassidic rabbi in Panemunke, Abel, and Kupishok, where he was killed in 1941.
- Rabbi Nachman Gershon Oshry, judge in the early 1900s.
- Rabbi M. Berzon, Chaplain of the army in 1895.
- Rabbi I.S. Gafni, wrote the Memory of Jacob.

Rabbi Ephraim Oshry was a famous rabbi from Kupiskis.
