= Kupiškis–Utena offensive =

- Part of Lithuanian–Soviet War
Date	1919 May 26 – June 3
Location	Eastern Aukštaitija, Lithuania
Result	Lithuanian victory

Belligerents
Lithuania	Russian SFSR

The Kupiškis–Utena offensive (Lithuanian: Kupiškio–Utenos operacija) was one of the first military operations planned by the military command of the Lithuanian Armed Forces, carried out from May 26 to June 3, 1919, during the Lithuanian–Soviet War. Part of the Lithuanian Wars of Independence.

== Background ==
The Red Army units, having suffered a defeat during the Lithuanian Army's successful Kurkliai–Panevėžys offensive, retreated and at the end of May 1919 concentrated on the Pakalniai–Leliūnai–Debeikiai–Svėdasai–Kupiškis–Vabalninkas line. The Lithuanian military leadership decided not to allow the Red Army units to establish themselves at this line. The offensive was prepared by the Commander-in-Chief of the Lithuanian Army (equivalent to the modern Chief of Defence), General Silvestras Žukauskas, and the General Staff of the Lithuanian Army.

Red Army position on May 26

Locations of stubborn Red Army resistance
Locations liberated by the Lithuanian Army

== Offensive ==
On May 26, 1919, units of the Panevėžys Group liberated Subačius, on May 27 – Troškūnai. The Joniškėlis partisan battalion liberated Biržai on May 26, and Vabalninkas on May 27. The Panevėžys Group, led by Stasys Nastopka from May 27, continued the attack on Kupiškis on May 28. Due to the stubborn resistance of the Red Army units near the villages of Miliūnai, Radžiūnai and Rudiliai, it was not possible to immediately take over Kupiškis, and they had to regroup and continue the attack with larger forces.

The partisans liberated Papilys on May 29, and Kvetkai on May 30. On the same day, a joint unit of partisans and Saxon volunteers liberated Pandėlys and Panemunis, and on the morning of May 31, Nemunėlio Radviliškis as well. Fearing that they would be surrounded, the Red Army units withdrew from Kupiškis by train towards Obeliai on the night of May 30–31.

The Panevėžys Group's units advanced east to the line Salamiestis–Jutkonys–Kuosėnai–Skodiniai–Butkūnai–Šimonys. The Ukmergė Group, led by Kazys Ladiga, launched an attack on Utena with three columns on May 31. After stubborn, three-day battles near Alanta, Pakalniai, Leliūnai and Vyžuonos, the Red Army units could not withstand the pressure of the Lithuanian and Saxon volunteer units and withdrew. On June 2, Utena was liberated.

After the Saxon volunteer units withdrew from the front, Lithuanian units liberated Užpaliai, Daugailiai and Tauragnai on June 3, and after liberating Obeliai on June 7, they contacted Latvian army units.

== Evaluation ==
The successful outcome of the Kupiškis–Utena offensive made it possible to liberate a significant part of the territory of northeastern Lithuania occupied by the Soviet Russian army and to continue the offensive against Soviet Russian units and reach the Daugava.

== Sources ==
- Lesčius, Vytautas (2007). "Kupiškio–Utenos operacija". Visuotinė lietuvių enciklopedija (in Lithuanian). Vol. XI (Kremacija-Lenzo taisyklė). Vilnius: Mokslo ir enciklopedijų leidybos institutas.
