= Skiemonys Eldership =

Eldership of Lithuania

The Skiemonys Eldership (Lithuanian: Skiemonių seniūnija) is an eldership of Lithuania, located in the Anykščiai District Municipality. In 2021 its population was 880.
