= Traupis Eldership =

Eldership of Lithuania

The Traupis Eldership (Lithuanian: Traupio seniūnija) is an eldership of Lithuania, located in the Anykščiai District Municipality. In 2021 its population was 569.
