= Svėdasai Eldership =

Eldership of Lithuania

The Svėdasai Eldership (Lithuanian: Svėdasų seniūnija) is an eldership of Lithuania, located in the Anykščiai District Municipality. In 2021 its population was 1761.
