= Viešintai Eldership =

Eldership of Lithuania

The Viešintai Eldership (Lithuanian: Viešintų seniūnija) is an eldership of Lithuania, located in the Anykščiai District Municipality. In 2021 its population was 657.
