= Ieva Jusionyte =

Lithuanian-American anthropologist (born 1984)

- Born: 1980s Lithuania
- Relatives: Domicėlė Tarabildienė (great-grandmother)
- Awards: MacArthur Fellowship (2025); Fulbright Fellowship (2006)

Academic background
- Education: Vilnius University; Brandeis University

Ieva Jusionyte, Ph.D., EMT-P (born 1984) is a Lithuanian-born legal and medical anthropologist at Brown University. She holds the Watson Family University Professorship in Security Studies and directs the Center for Human Rights and Humanitarian Studies at Brown's Watson School of International and Public Affairs. She has worked as an emergency responder and is a certified EMT-paramedic.

In 2025 Jusionyte was awarded a MacArthur Fellowship for her scholarship exploring themes of politics, ethics and justice in border regions. Her 2024 book, Exit Wounds: How America’s Guns Fuel Violence Across the Border won the Juan E. Méndez Book Award for Human Rights in Latin America, PROSE Award for Excellence in Social Sciences, and R.R Hawkins Award from the Association of American Publishers.

== Early life & education ==
Jusionyte was born in Lithuania during the Soviet Occupation and raised in the Valakampiai area outside Vilnius. Many in Jusionyte's immediate and extended family worked in the arts, including her brother, father, uncle, and grandparents. She is the great-granddaughter of noted Lithuanian artist Domicėlė Tarabildienė.

Jusionyte attended secondary school in Žirmūnai and went on to study at Vilnius University, where she received her B.A. in political science in 2006. In 2006 she attended Brandeis University to begin graduate studies in anthropology on a Fulbright Fellowship. Jusionyte received her M.A. and Ph.D. from Brandeis in 2007 and 2012, respectively.

== Career ==
Jusionyte is a legal and medical anthropologist. Her research interests/areas include human rights, immigration, displacement & borders, the US-Mexico border, migration, violence, security, drug policies and drug trafficking, gun safety and gun trafficking. She is Editor of the California Series in Public Anthropology. She was previously a member of the anthropology faculty at Harvard University (2016–2020) and an assistant professor of anthropology at the University of Florida (2012–2016). Her research has appeared in scholarly journals including Cultural Anthropology, American Anthropologist and American Ethnologist.

== Published works ==
- Exit Wounds: How America’s Guns Fuel Violence Across the Border, University of California Press (2024)
- Threshold: Emergency Responders on the US-Mexico Border University of California Press (2018)
- Savage Frontier: Making News and Security on the Argentine Border, University of California Press (2015)
