= Andrioniškis Eldership =

The Andrioniškis Eldership (Lithuanian: Andrioniškio seniūnija) is an eldership of Lithuania, located in the Anykščiai District Municipality. In 2021 its population was 413.
