= Naujieji Elmininkai =

- Village
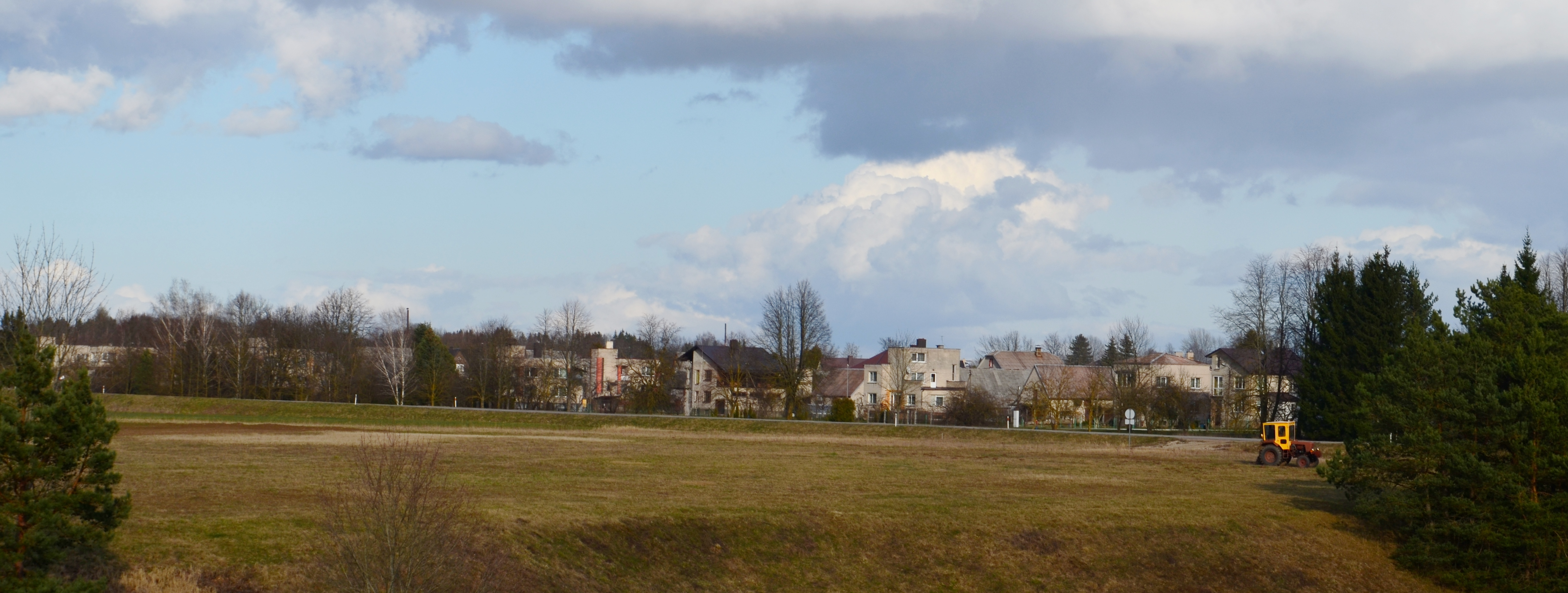

- Location within Lithuania
- Coordinates: 55°32′50″N 25°09′00″E
- Country: Lithuania
- County: Utena County
- Municipality: Anykščiai

Population (2011)
  - Total: 573
- Time zone: UTC+2 (EET)
  - Summer (DST): UTC+3 (EEST)

Naujieji Elmininkai is a village in Anykščiai district municipality, in Utena County, in northeast Lithuania. According to the 2011 census, the village has a population of 573 people.

The village has Elmininkų manor, a library.

There is Šeimyniškelių hillfort near the Elmininkai village.
