= Traupis =

- Town
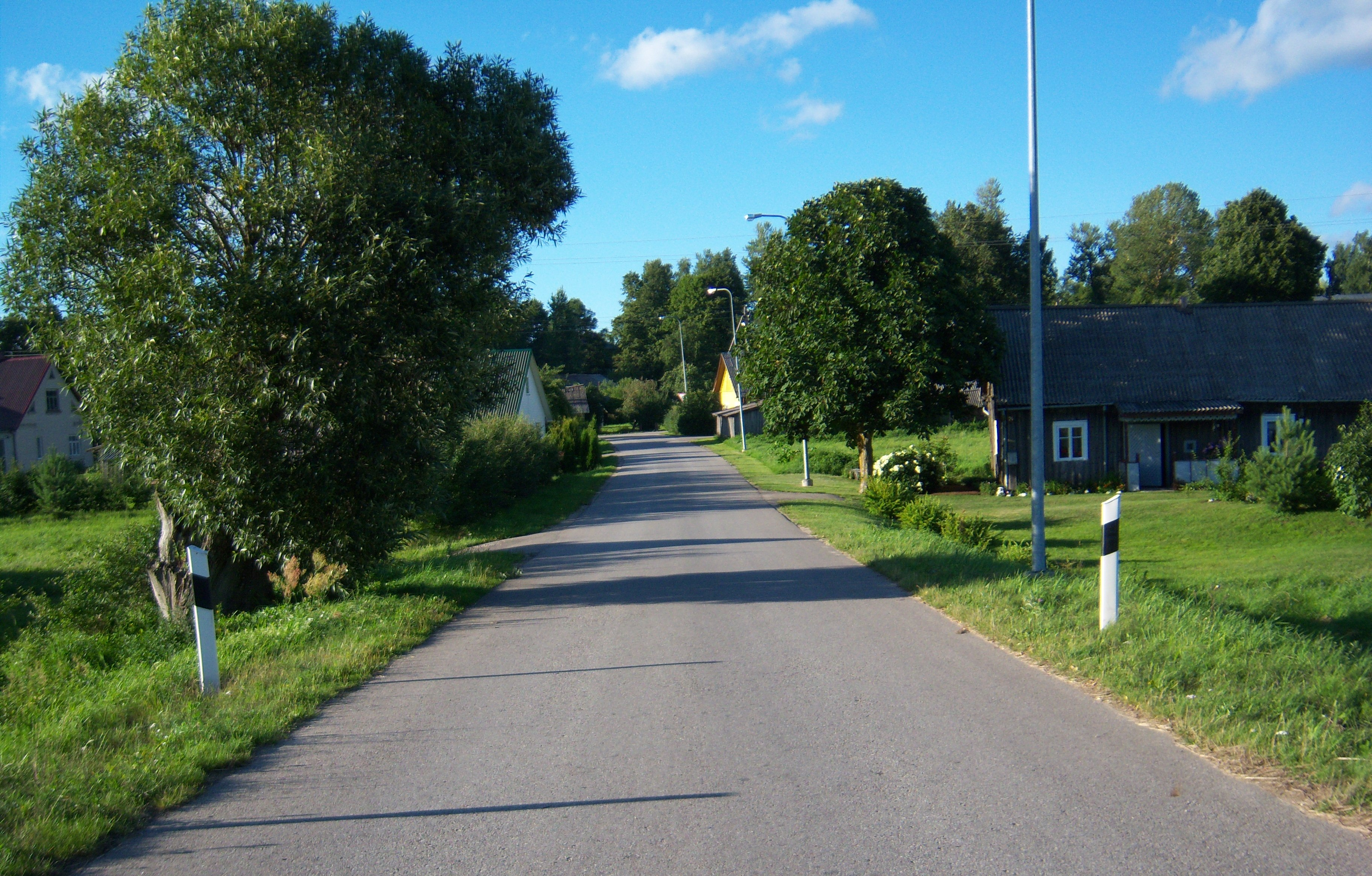

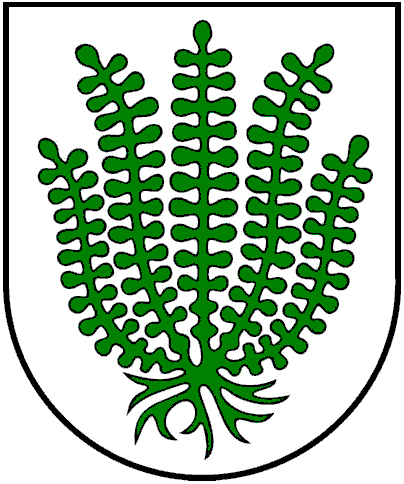
- Coat of arms

- Location within Lithuania
- Coordinates: 55°30′50″N 24°45′00″E
- Country: Lithuania
- County: Utena County
- Municipality: Anykščiai

Population (2011)
  - Total: 179
- Time zone: UTC+2 (EET)
  - Summer (DST): UTC+3 (EEST)
- Website: http://www.traupis.lt/

Traupis is a town in Anykščiai district municipality, in Utena County, in northeast Lithuania. According to the 2011 census, the town has a population of 179 people. Town established near Nevėžis River.

== Gallery ==
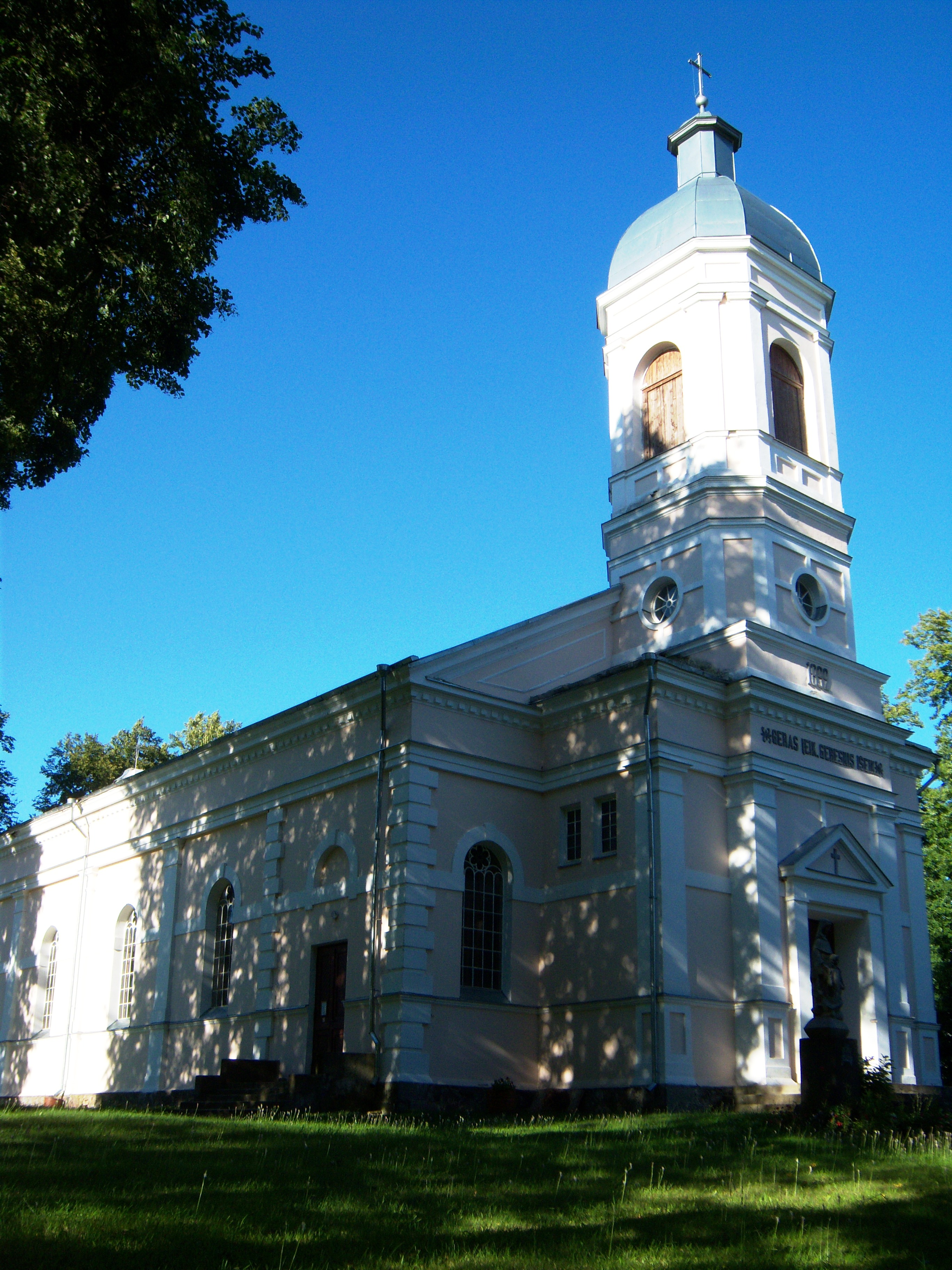
St. Anne's Church

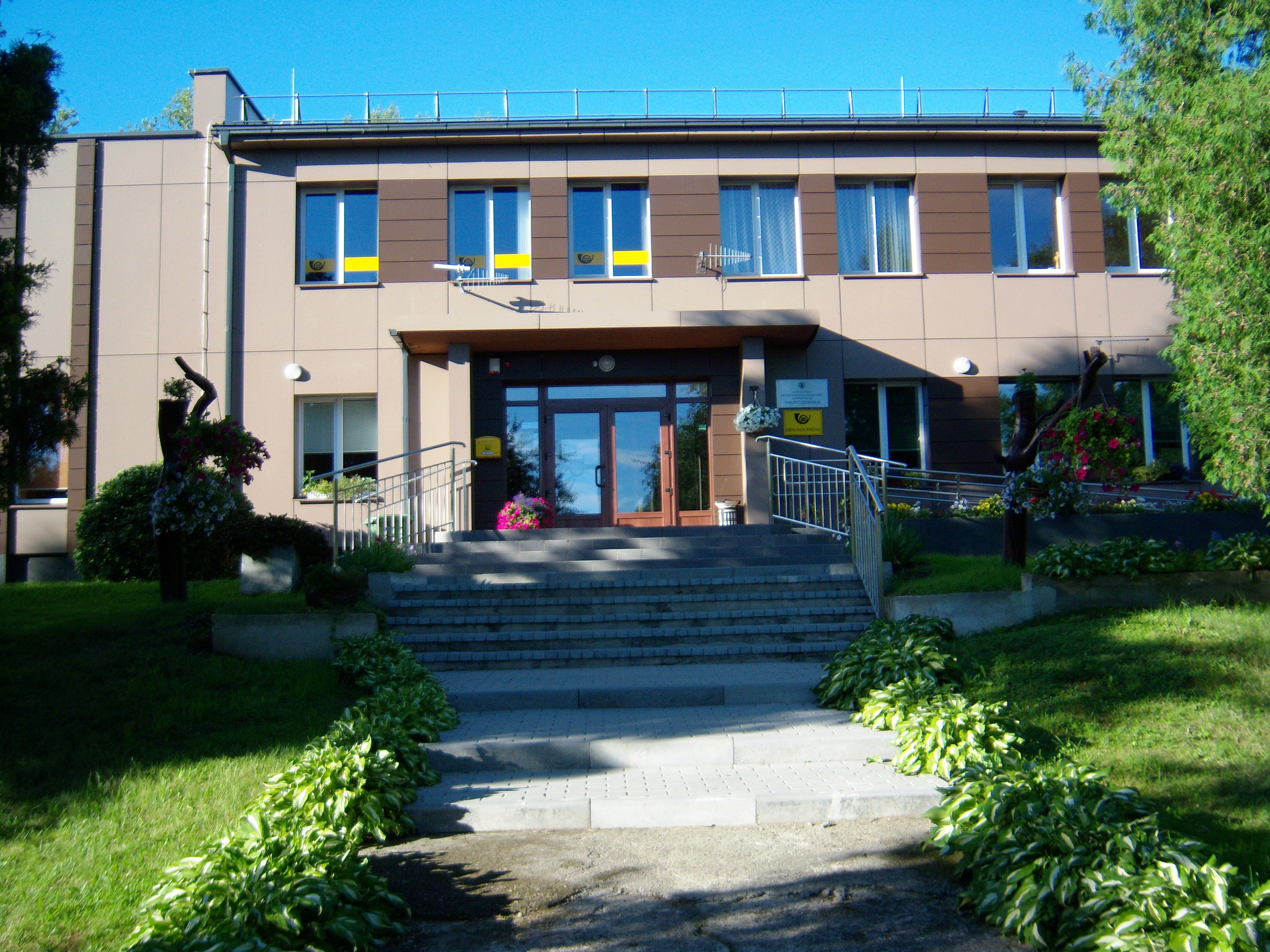
Parish

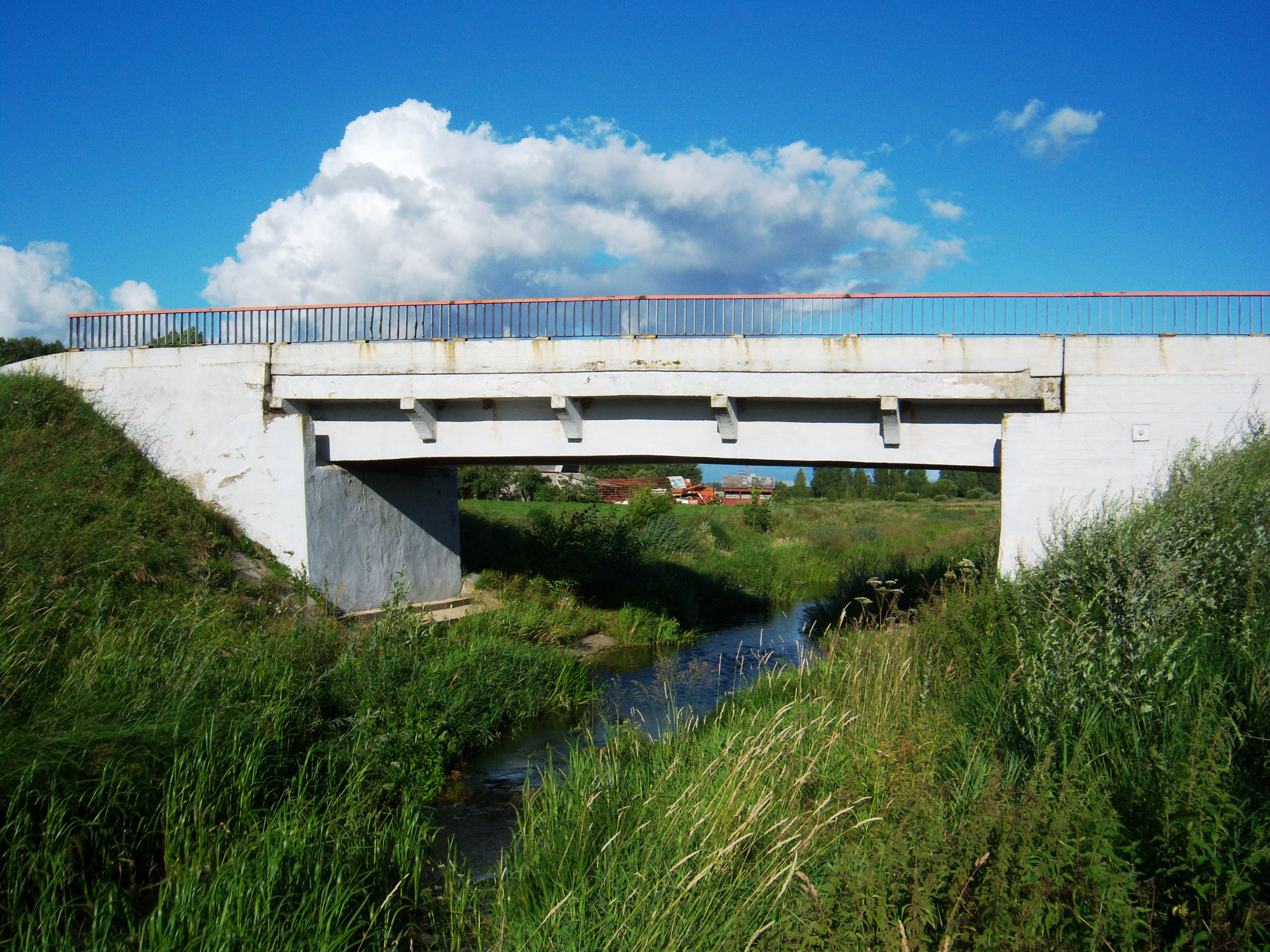
Nevėžis bridge

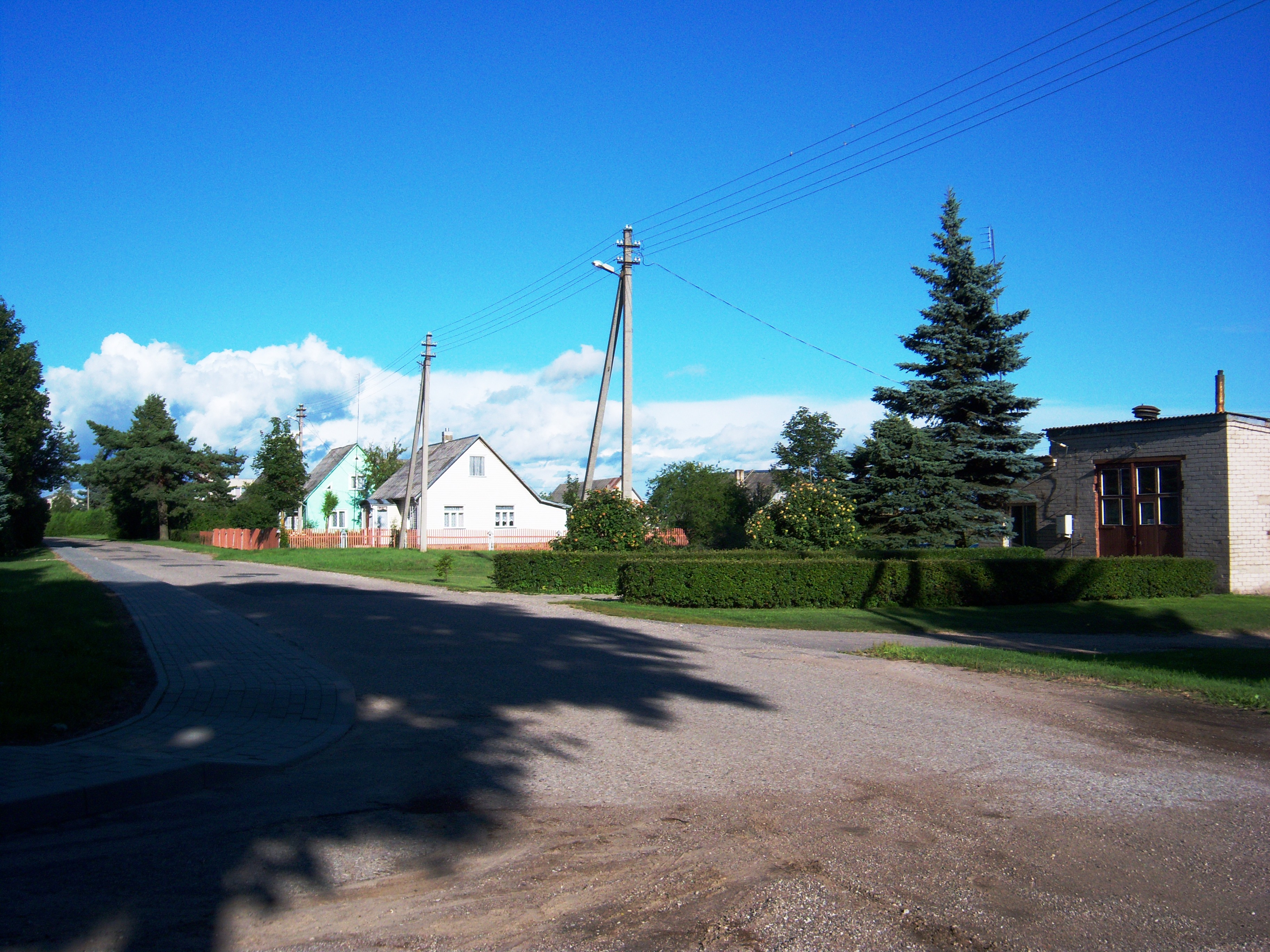
Nevėžis street

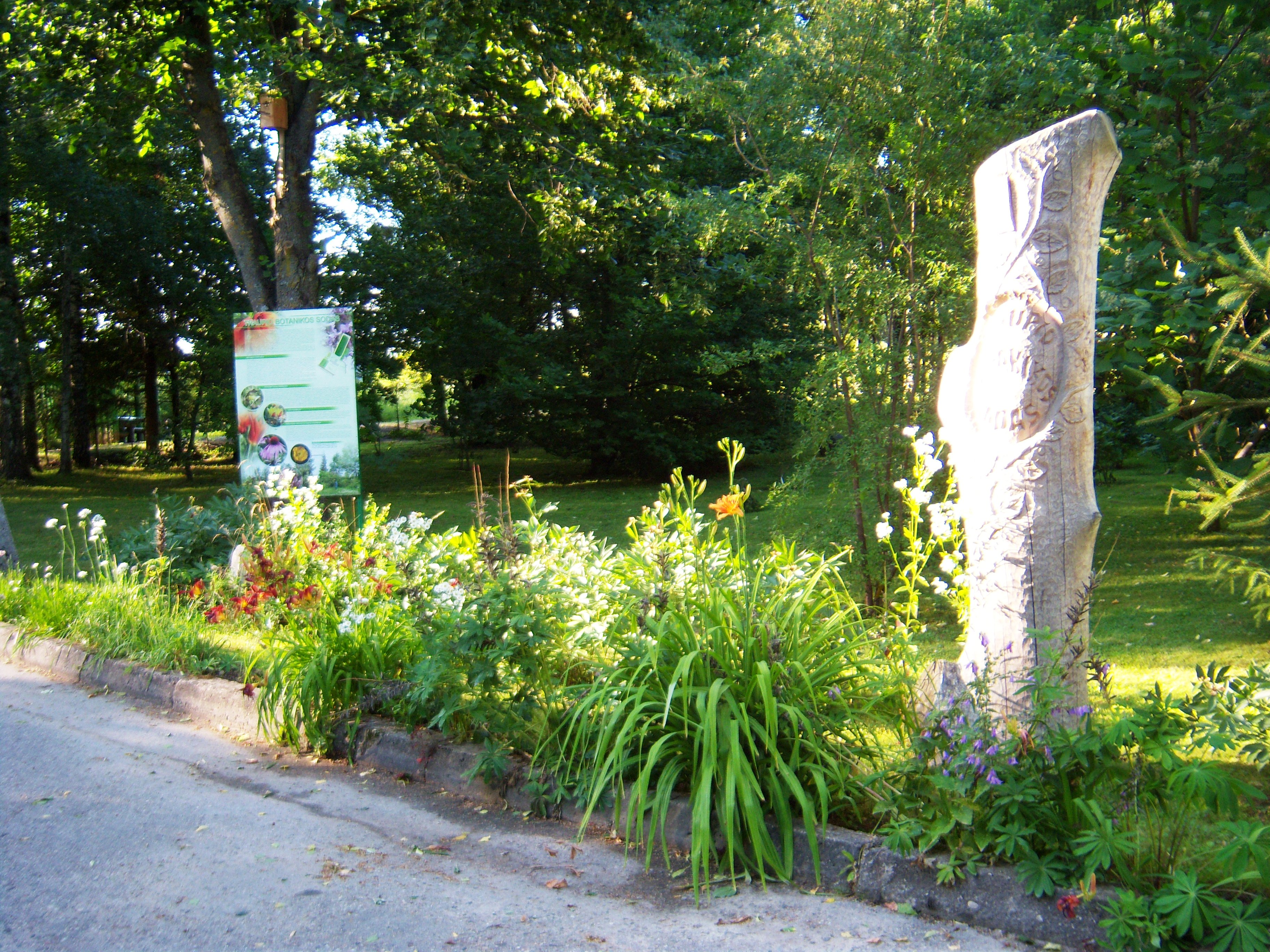
Botanical garden

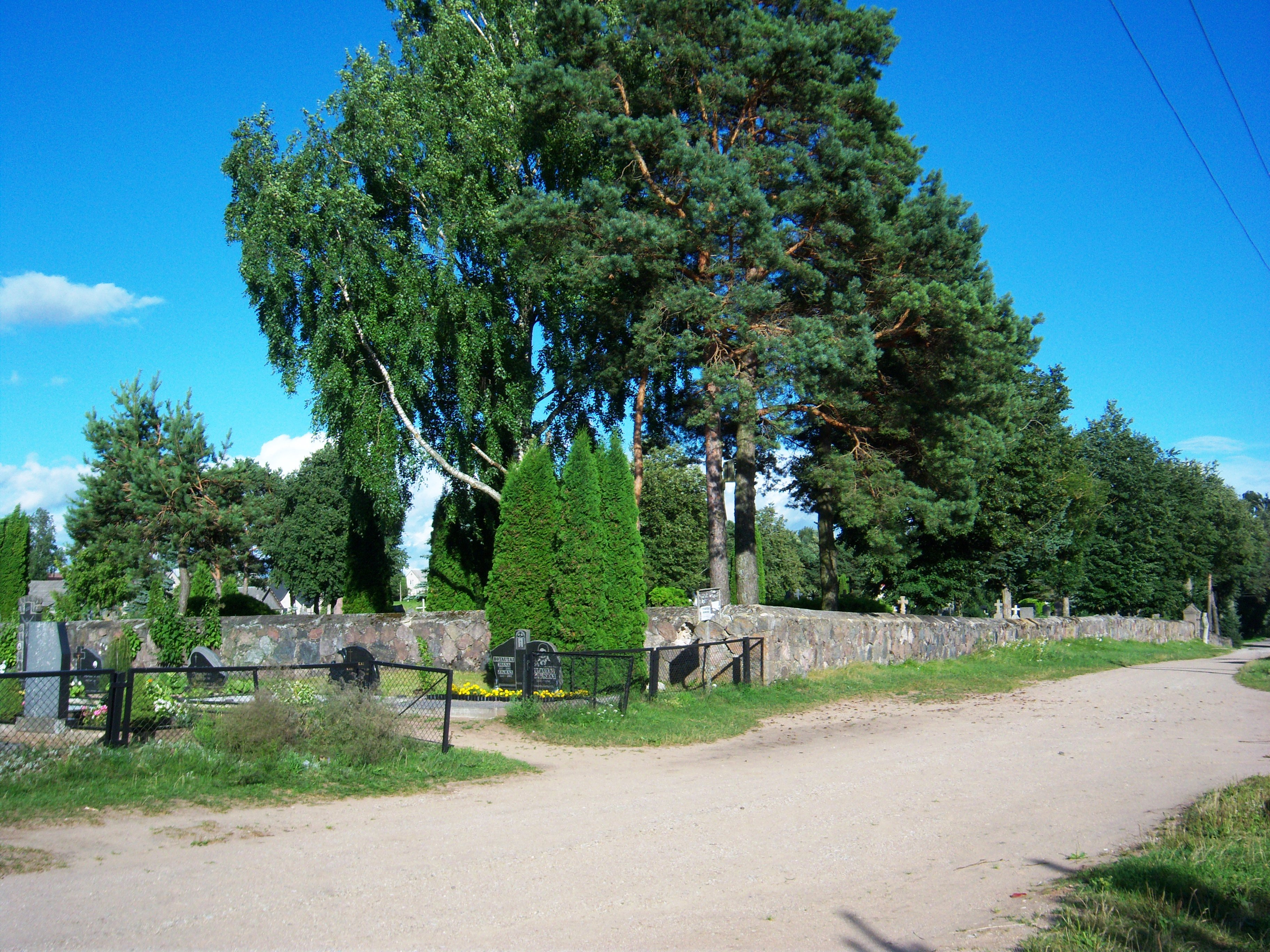
Cemetery

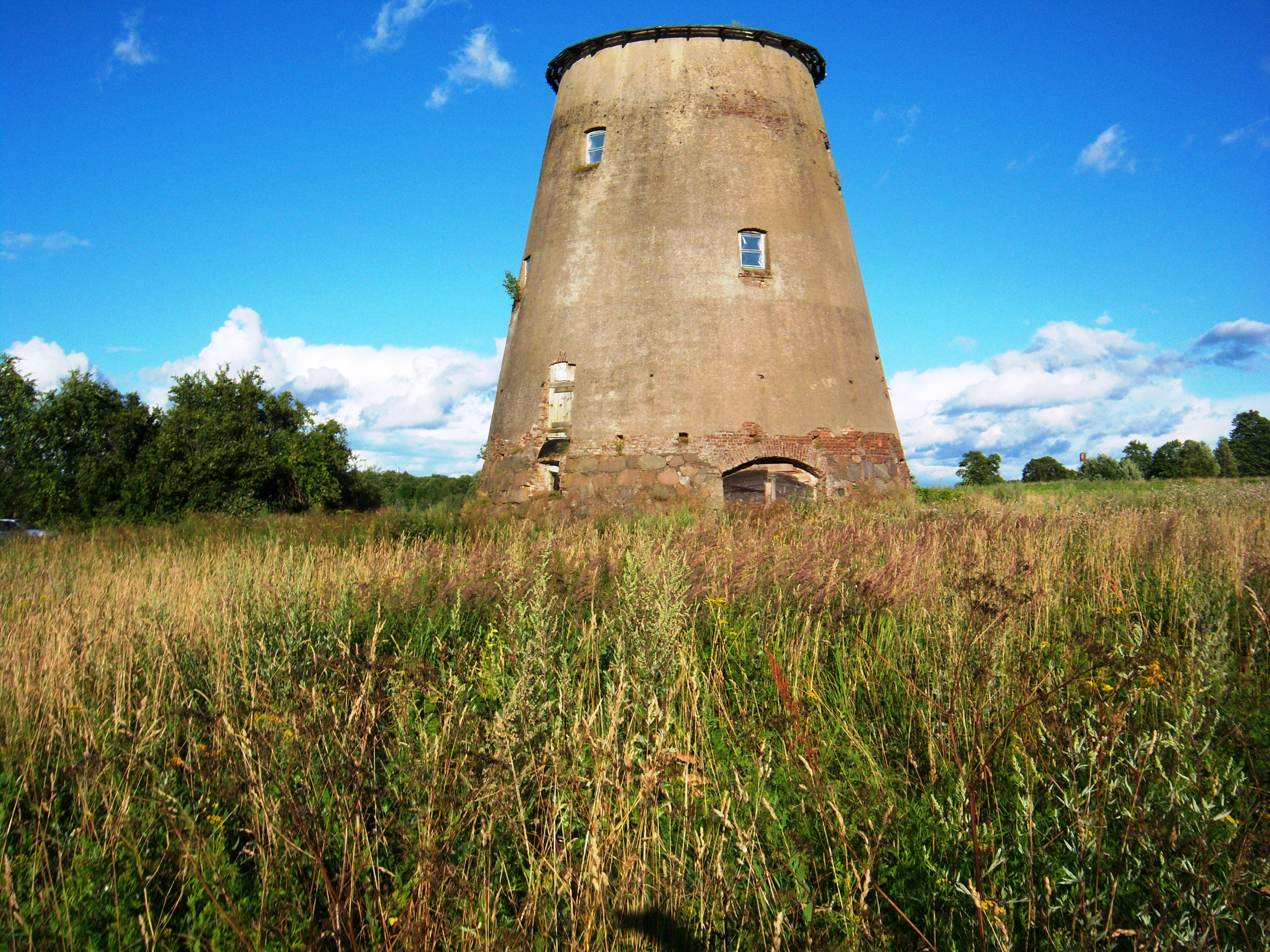
Former mill

== Education ==
- Traupis primary school
