= Palėvenė =

- Town
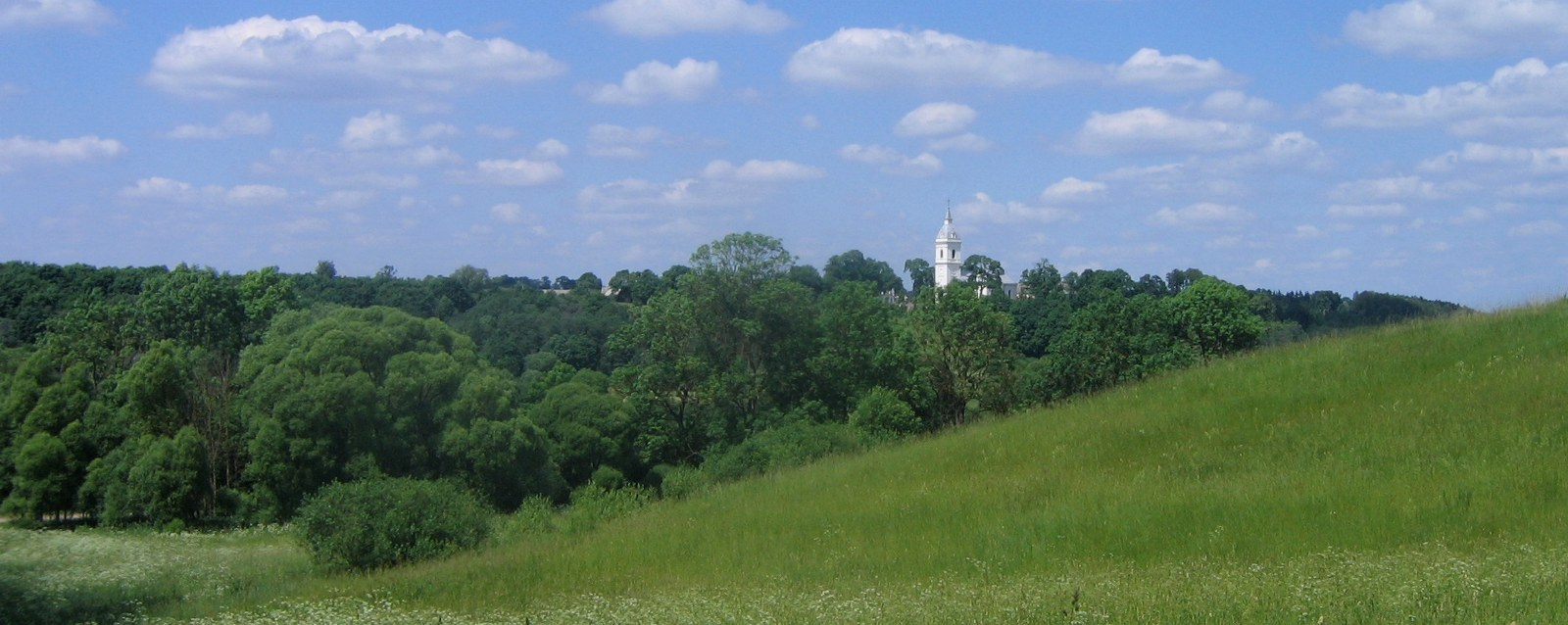

- Location within Lithuania
- Coordinates: 55°50′0″N 24°54′10″E
- Country: Lithuania
- County: Panevėžys County

Population (2011)
  - Total: 74
- Time zone: UTC+2 (EET)
  - Summer (DST): UTC+3 (EEST)

Palėvenė is a small residential town in Panevėžys County, in northeastern Lithuania. According to the 2011 census, the town has a population of 74 people. There is a white chapel in the centre of the town that serves as a relic of the first Dominican monks settling in the area in 1676.
