= Skiemonys =

- Town
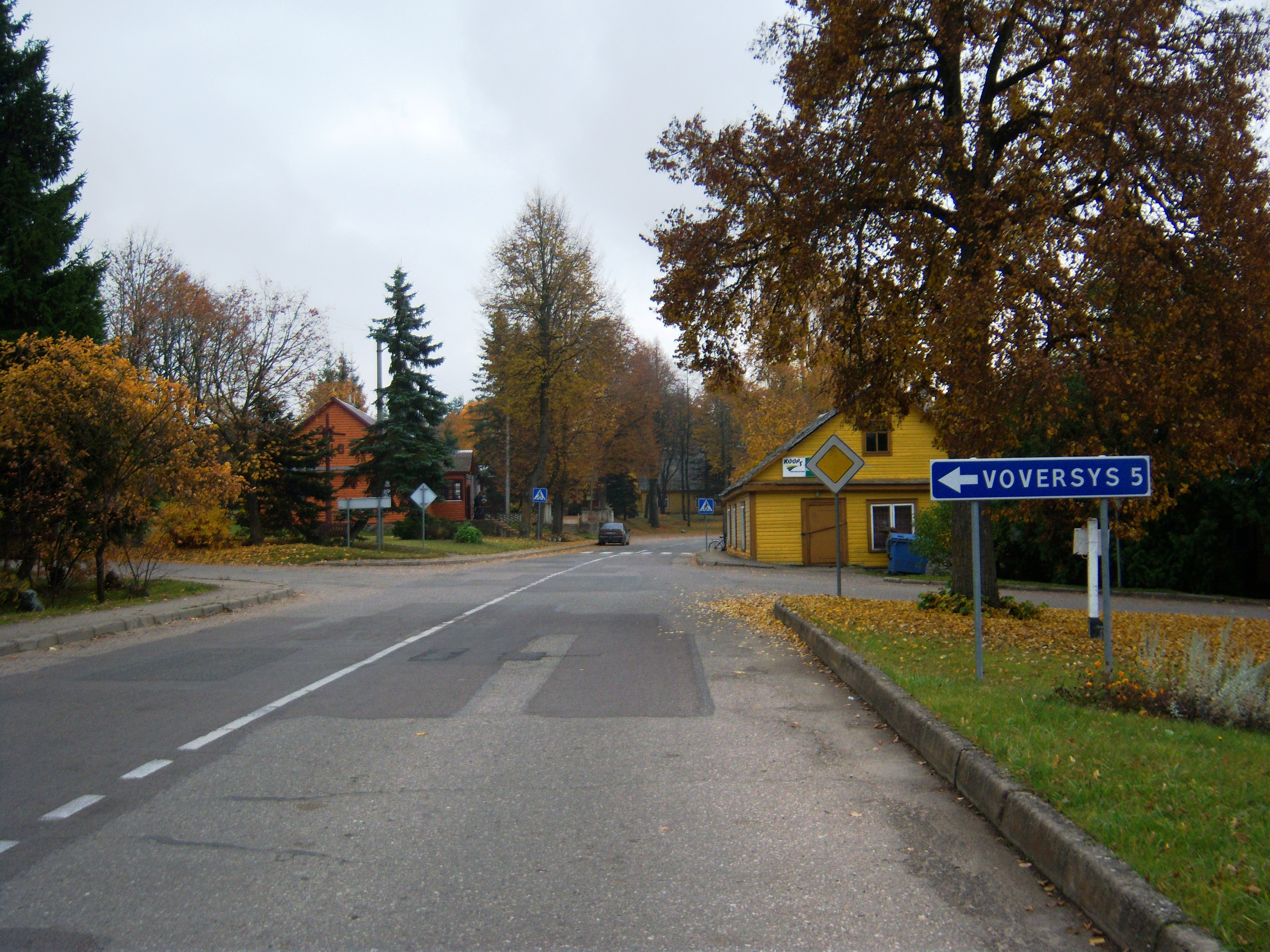

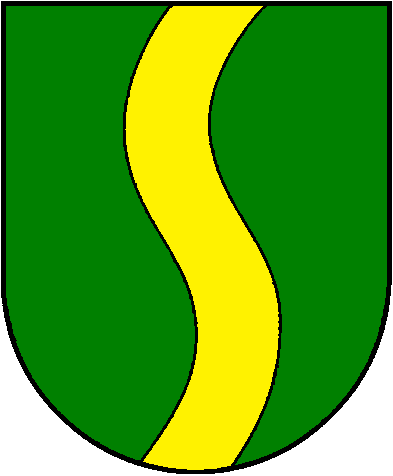
- Coat of arms

- Location within Lithuania
- Coordinates: 55°25′00″N 25°16′30″E
- Country: Lithuania
- County: Utena County
- Municipality: Anykščiai

Population (2011)
  - Total: 38
- Time zone: UTC+2 (EET)
  - Summer (DST): UTC+3 (EEST)

Skiemonys (Polish: Skiemiany) is a town in Anykščiai district municipality, in Utena County, in northeast Lithuania. According to the 2011 census, the town has a population of 38 people.

== Gallery ==
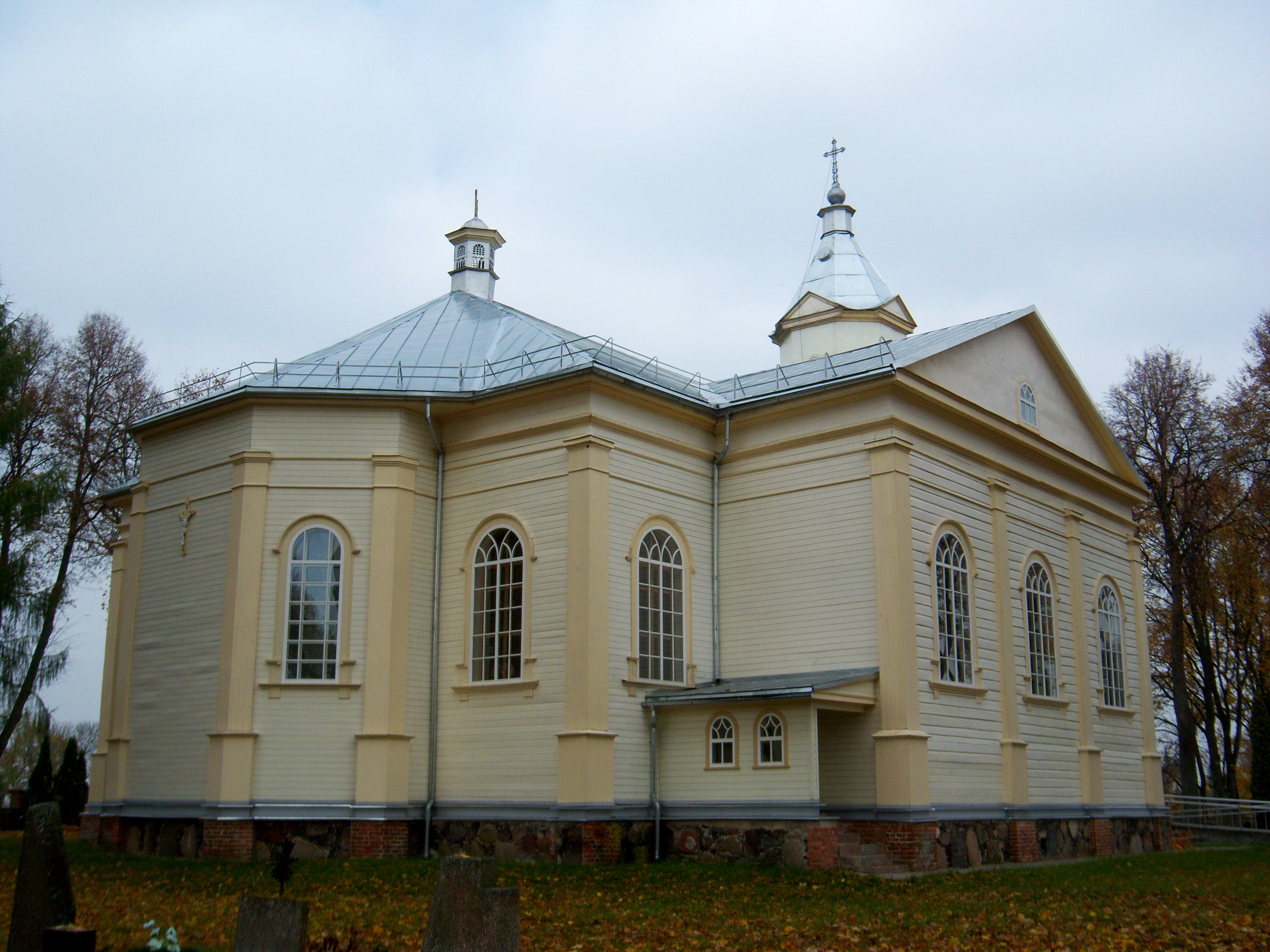
St. Mary Church

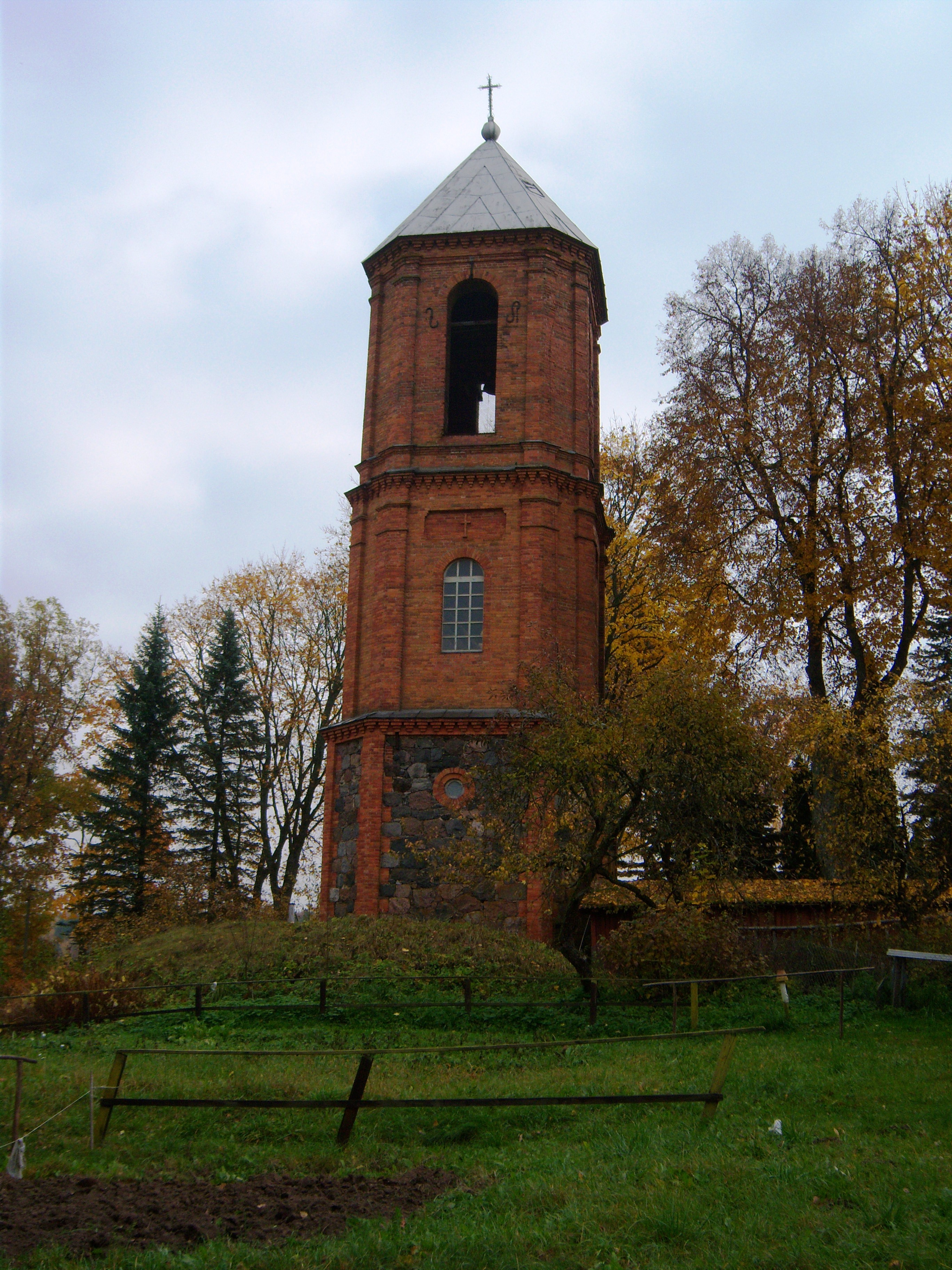
Church belfry

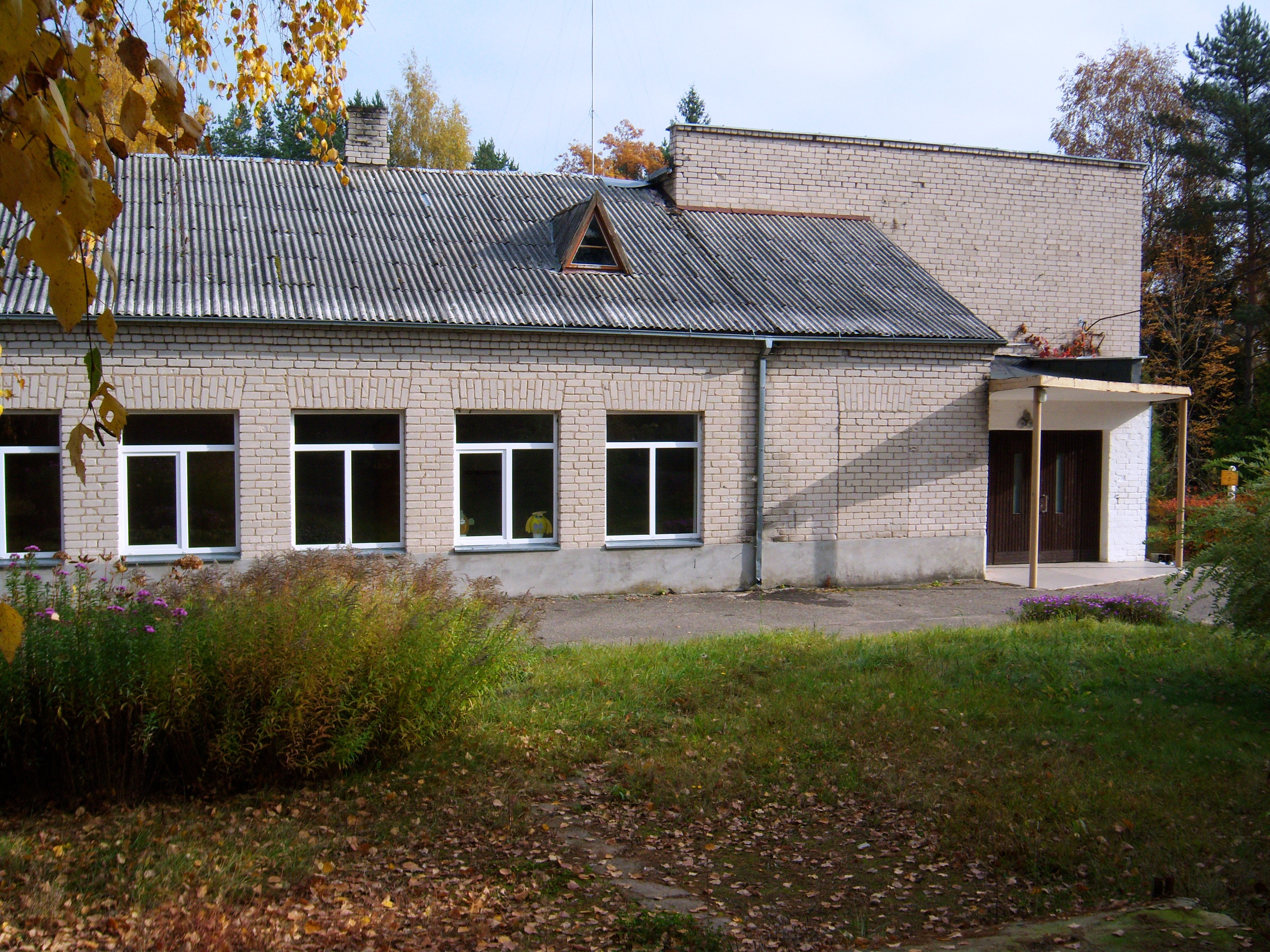
School

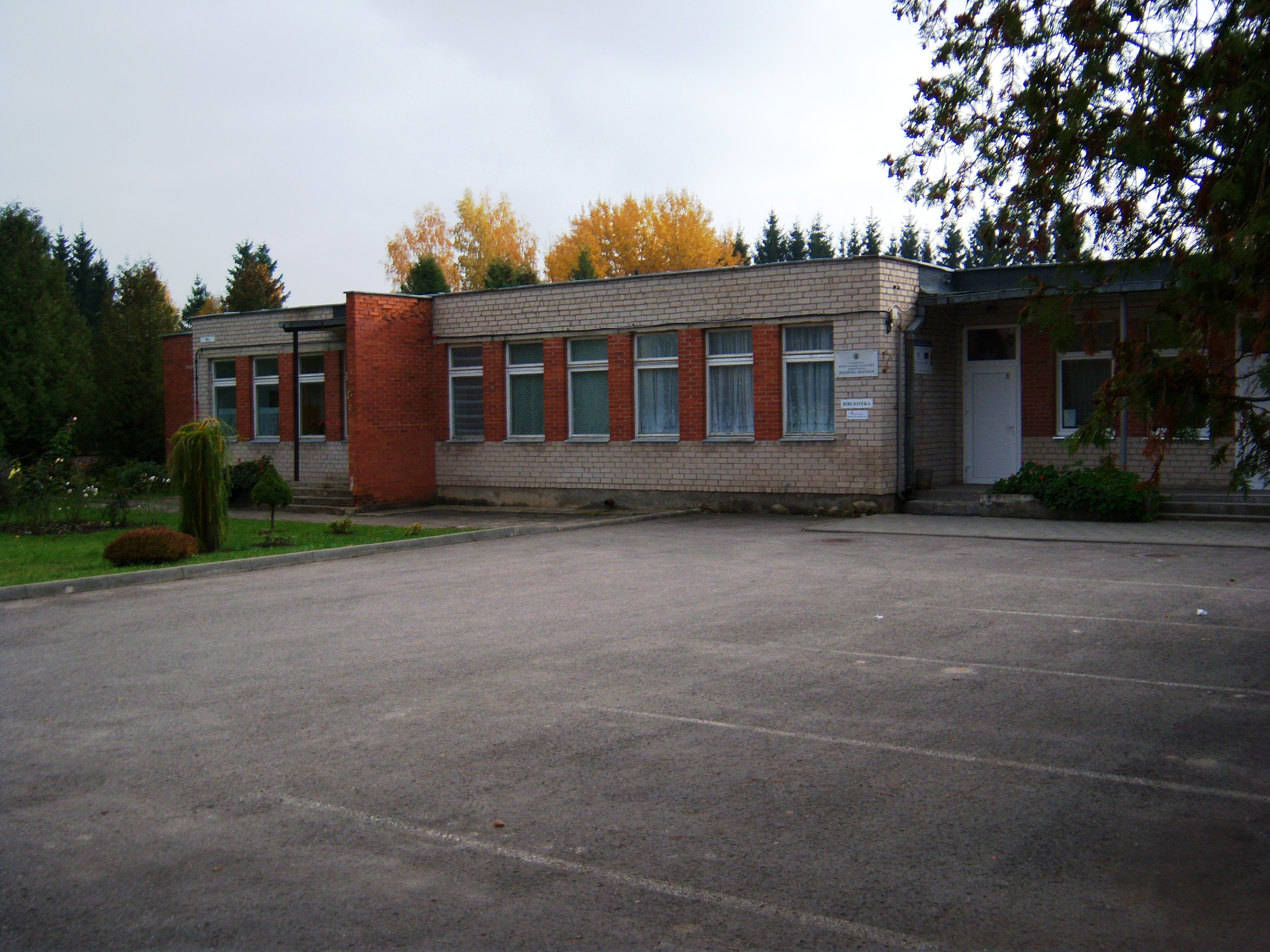
Parish

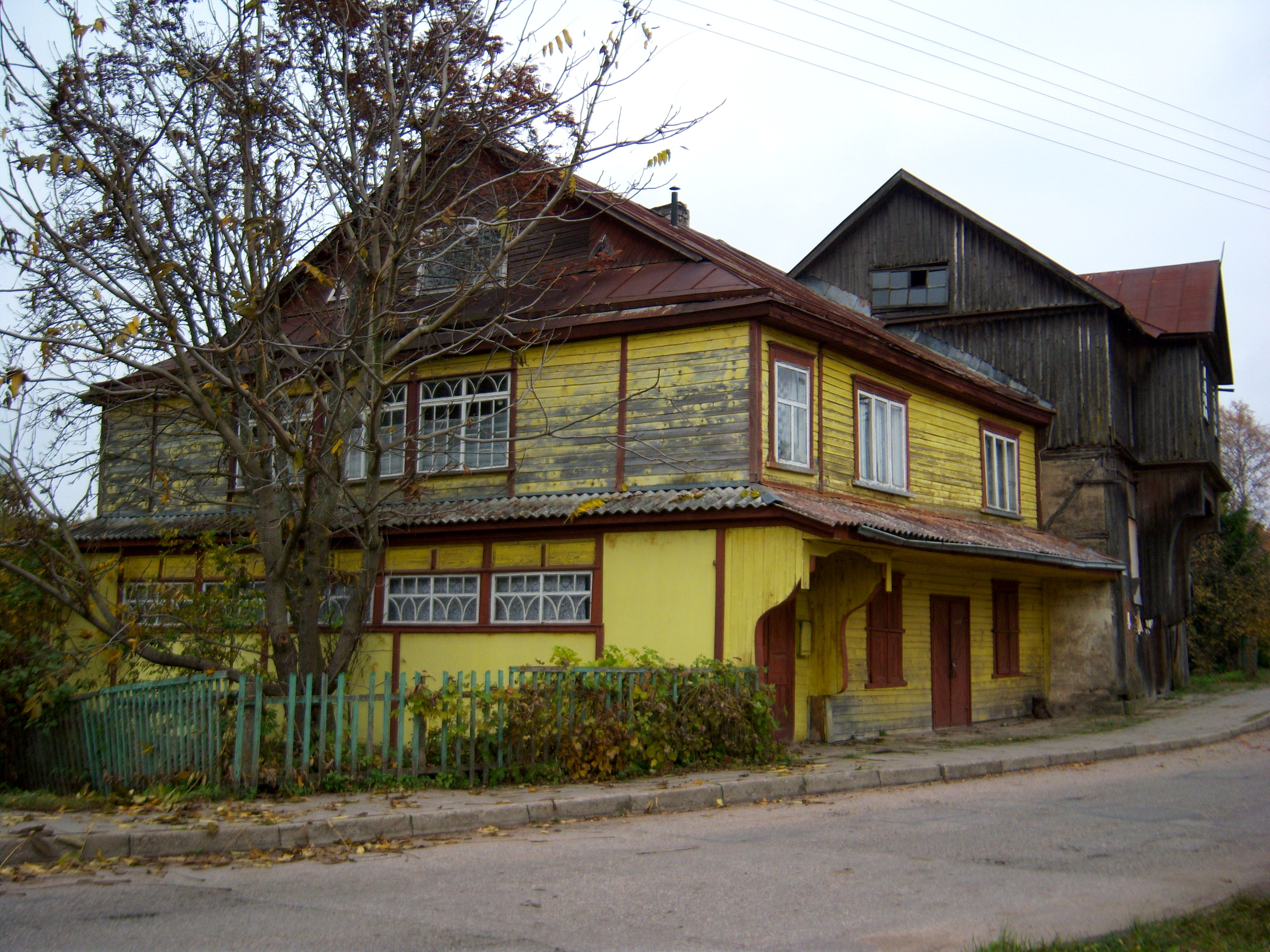
Former mill

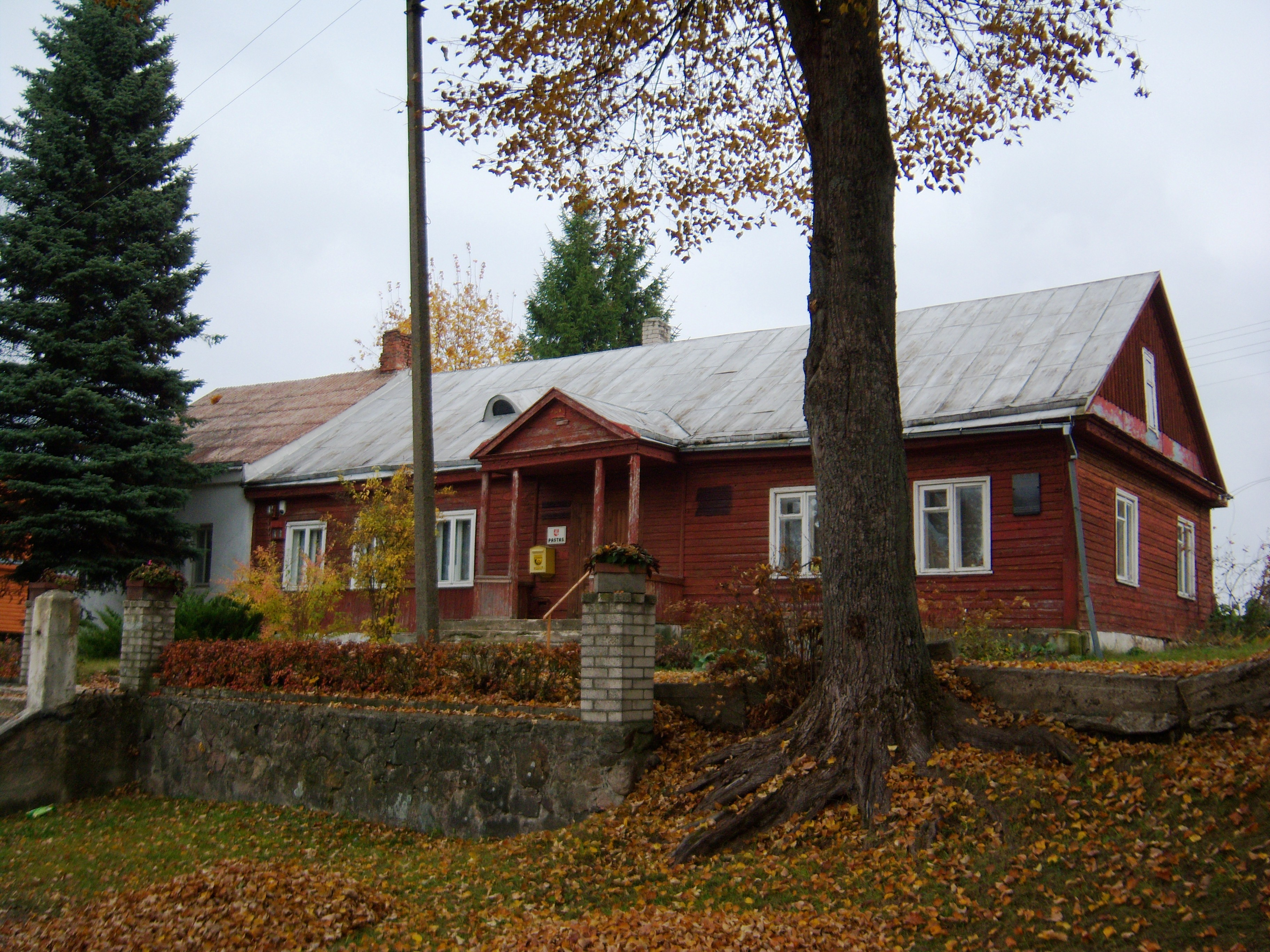
Post

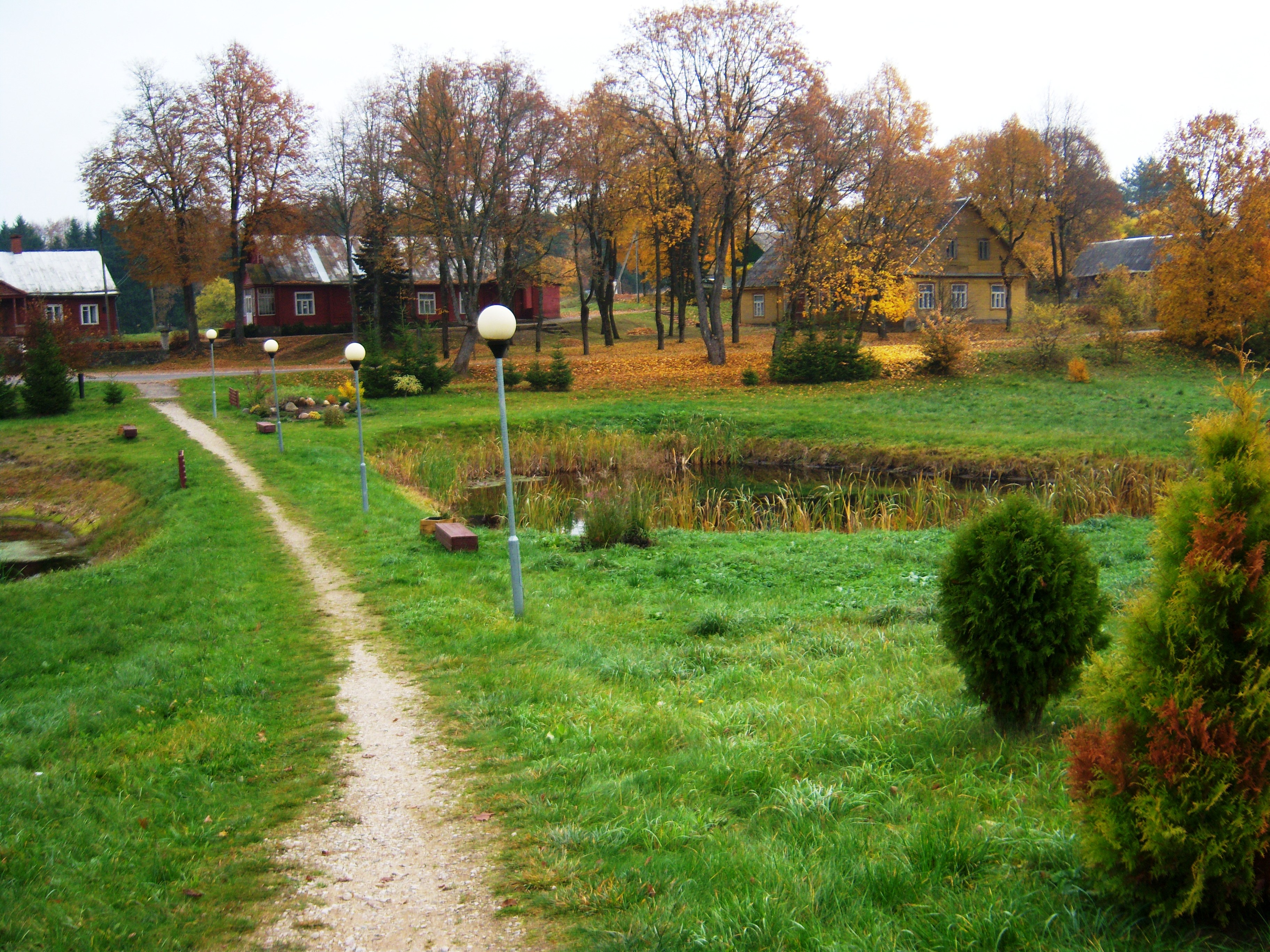
Park

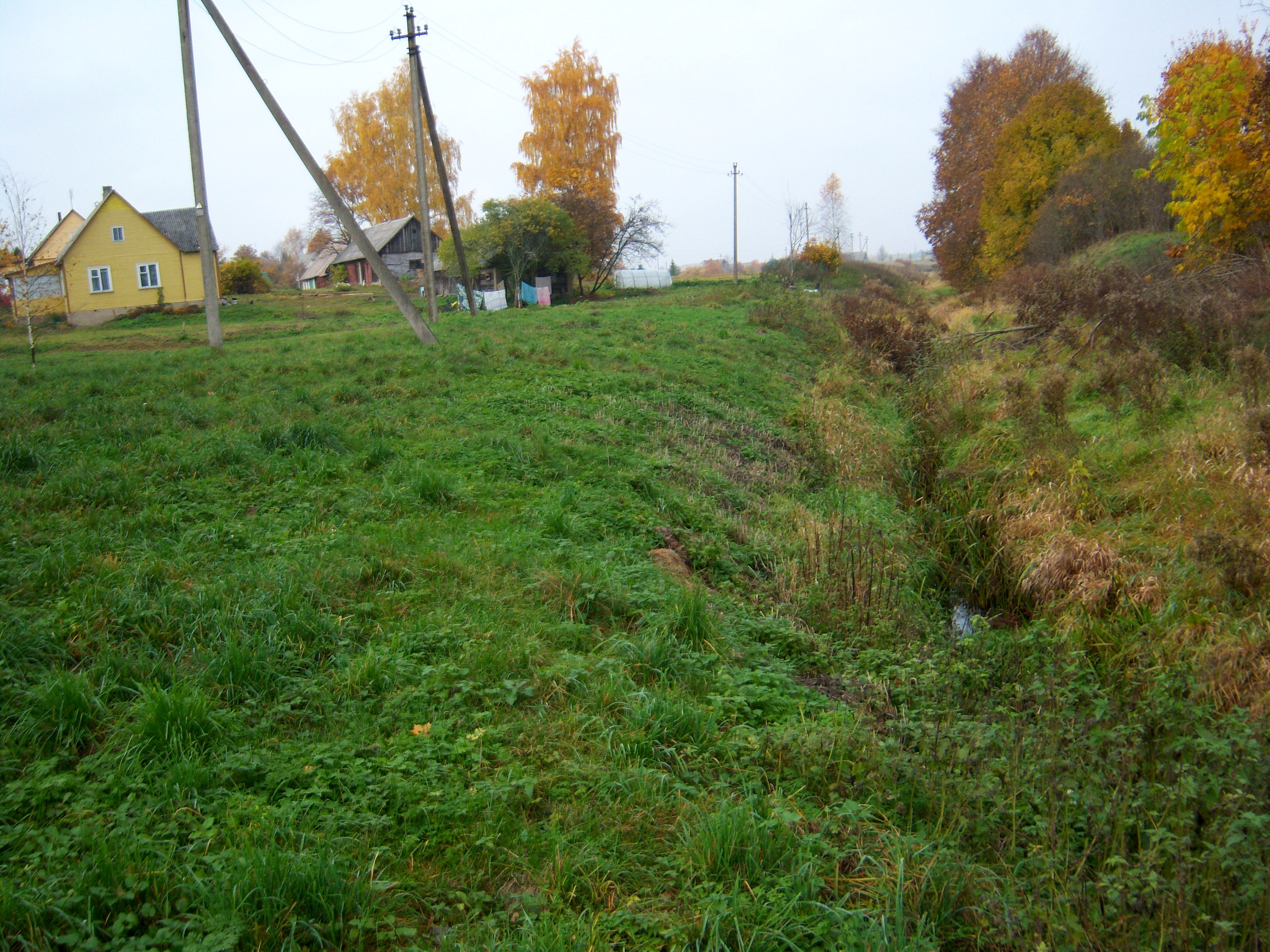
Lukna
