= Kavarskas =

- City
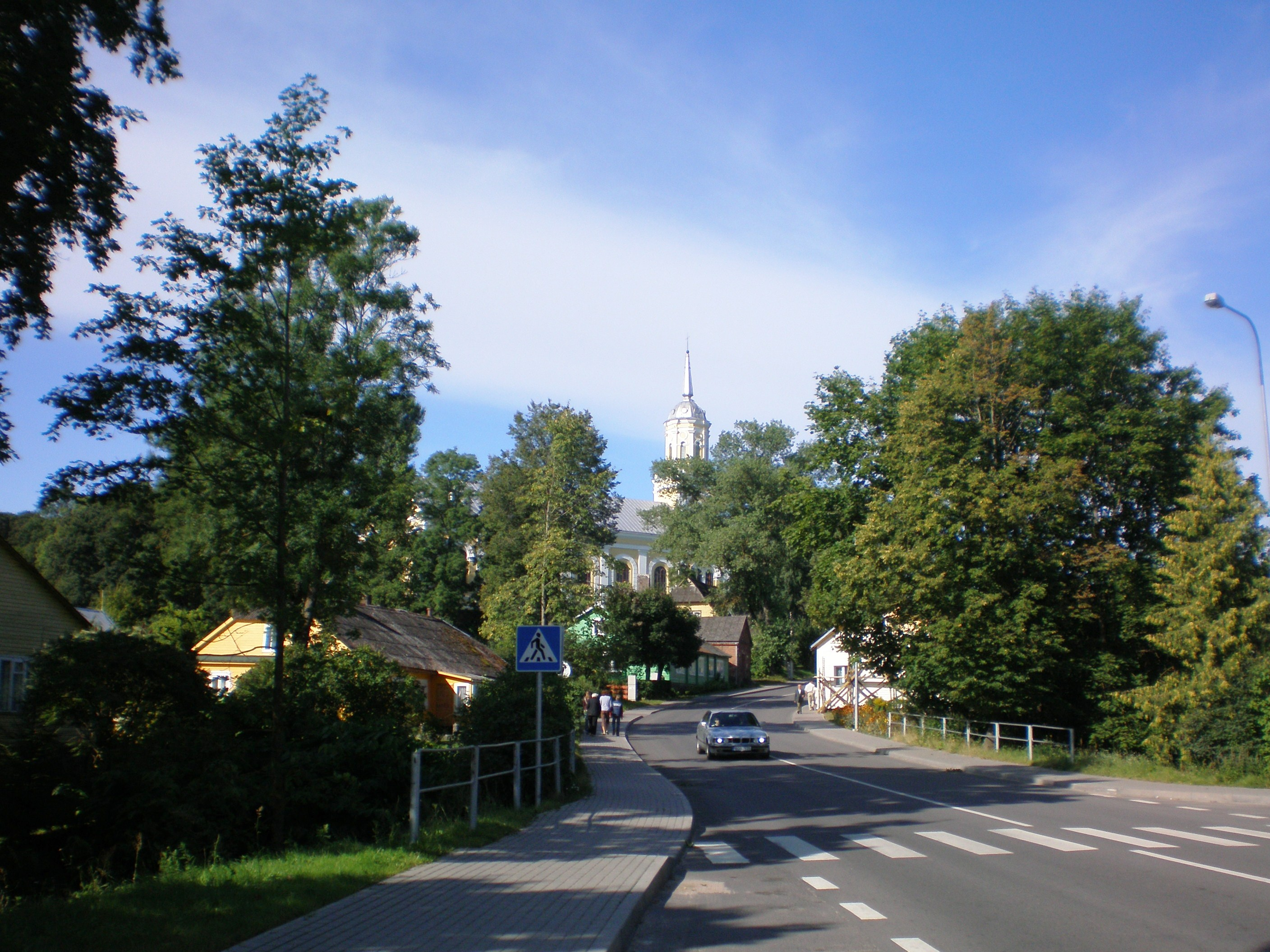

- Coat of arms

- Location of Kavarskas
- Coordinates: 55°26′0″N 24°55′0″E
- Country: Lithuania
- Ethnographic region: Aukštaitija
- County: Utena County
- Municipality: Anykščiai district municipality
- Eldership: Kavarskas eldership
- Capital of: Kavarskas eldership
- First mentioned: 1538

Population (2021)
  - Total: 486
- Time zone: UTC+2 (EET)
  - Summer (DST): UTC+3 (EEST)

Kavarskas, with a population of only 700, is the fourth smallest city in Lithuania. The Šventoji River flows through the town. In 1956 near Kavarskas a water lifting station was built and part of the Šventoji River's water was channeled to the Nevėžis River. Nowadays there is a water-power plant operating there.

== Etymology ==
The name of Kavarskas comes from the surname of Stanisław Kowarski, who owned the Manor of Mažyų Pienionių (manorial place name). Although there are not many place names in Lithuania that are based on the singular of the surname, there are some (Sudargas, Musteika, perhaps Birštonas). In other languages, the town is known as: Polish: Kowarsk.

== Coat of arms ==
The town flag or coat of arms shows a sword creating two streams of water. The coat of arms is painted on a blue field background. It shows a golden sword stabbed into a green hill and silver water springing from the hole.

According to a local legend, a spring of mineral water in Kavarskas was the site of a significant event in the history of the town. The legend recounts that, at a certain moment in time, a senior army chief was tasked with the selection of his successor. The chief plunged his sword into the earth to its hilt and declared that the warrior who would succeed him would be the one to extract the sword from its position. Numerous warriors attempted this feat, but only one of them was successful. Upon extracting the sword, a spring of pure water gushed forth from the ground. The Spring of Saint John the Baptist is located in Kavarskas.

== History ==
Where the modern town is today located, in the 15th century there was the Mažieji Pienionys (Little Pienionys) estate. At the end of the 15th century, the Grand Duke of Lithuania Alexander Jagiellon transferred the estate to Stanislovas Kovarskis, the treasurer of the king. As he had no successors, the estate was inherited by his brother, Andrius Kovarskis, the canon of the Vilnius Cathedral. Thus, the name of the Little Pienionys estate was changed to Kavarskas.

In written sources, Kavarskas was first mentioned in 1538. In that year, a church was built. In the 16th century, Kavarskas and the surrounding area belonged to noble families of Astikai, later – Ogiński (Oginskiai), Tyszkiewicz (Tiškevičiai), and Siesickiai. The Šventoji river that runs near the town was used for drinking water, crops, and to power a flour mill.

The National Resurrection Cross was built in Kaltinėnai (Šilalė district).

During the summer of 1941, the Jewish population was murdered in a mass execution perpetrated by German soldiers and three Lithuanian white armbanders.

An 1892 taxpayers' list shows Kavarskas population to be 1,505 people. A 1892-1894 Lithuania Revision List included 844 names. This represents approximately 55% of the town's population in 1897, when 1546 persons were counted. In 1956, Kavarskas was granted town rights. In 2021, the town had 2,361 residents.
