= Domicėlė Tarabildienė =

Lithuanian photographer and artist

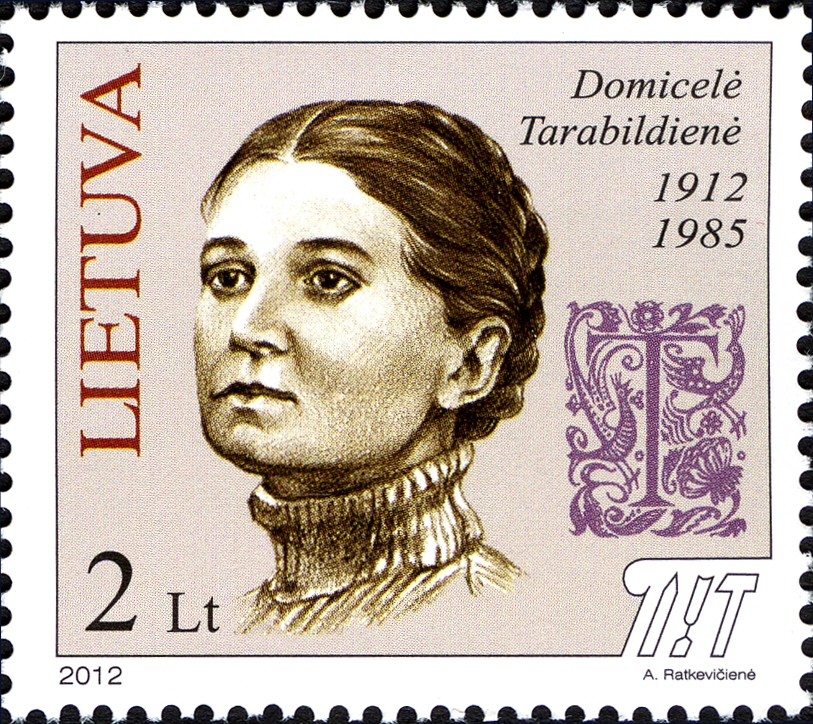
Tarabildienė on a Lithuanian postal stamp

Domicėlė Tarabildienė (1912, Andrioniškis – 1985, Vilnius) was a Lithuanian photographer, graphic artist and book illustrator.

Domicėlė Tarabildaitė was born in Andrioniškis, then in Kovno Governorate, one of nine children in her family. After graduating from Panevėžys Gymnasium, Tarabildienė studied in Kaunas from 1929 to 1935 and specialized in sculpture, which she studied with Juozas Zikaras. Her graduation work was rated as excellent, and she was awarded a fellowship to continue her study abroad. In 1937, she went to Paris, together with her husband Petras Tarabildas and her oldest son Arunas. Two other children, Giedrę and Ramon, stayed back in Lithuania. In 1937, she won a medal for illustration at the Paris International Exhibition. Subsequently, Tarabildienė studied sculpture for two years at École nationale supérieure des arts décoratifs. She also traveled around Southern Europe. When World War II started, Tarabildienė was still in Paris, and she went back to Lithuania to reunite with the two children. Subsequently, Lithuania was occupied by the Soviet Union. Tarabildienė was a member of the Lithuanian Roerikh Society, which was run in Kaunas between 1935 and 1940 by the followers of Nicholas Roerich.

In 1930, Tarabildienė became interested in photography, which did not exist in Lithuania as an art before her. She learned many photographic techniques which distorted the conventional view of the image, such as soft focus or double exposure. She first had a preference for staged self-portraits. She made some photomontages as well.

Experimental photography was not considered a way to earn the living in Lithuania in the 1930s, and she abandoned photography completely after the war. Since 1935, she was mostly working in graphics, including book illustration. Starting from 1940, when she first got a major prize for her work (The State Prize of the savings banks), Tarabildienė was considered the most influential Lithuanian graphical artist. She developed a special technique to illustrate folkloric motives, and she exerted a lot of influence of the younger artists. In particular, during the Soviet period artists were generally not allowed to travel abroad, and Tarabildienė's style became one of the standards in Lithuania.

In 1950, her first major solo exhibition was held in Kaunas. In 1972, she was awarded the State Prize of the Lithuanian SSR, and in 1974 was made the People's Artist of the Lithuanian SSR.

A big exhibition showing about 120 works of Tarabildienė was held in Vilnius in 2012, celebrating 100 years since her birth.
