= Andrioniškis =

- Town
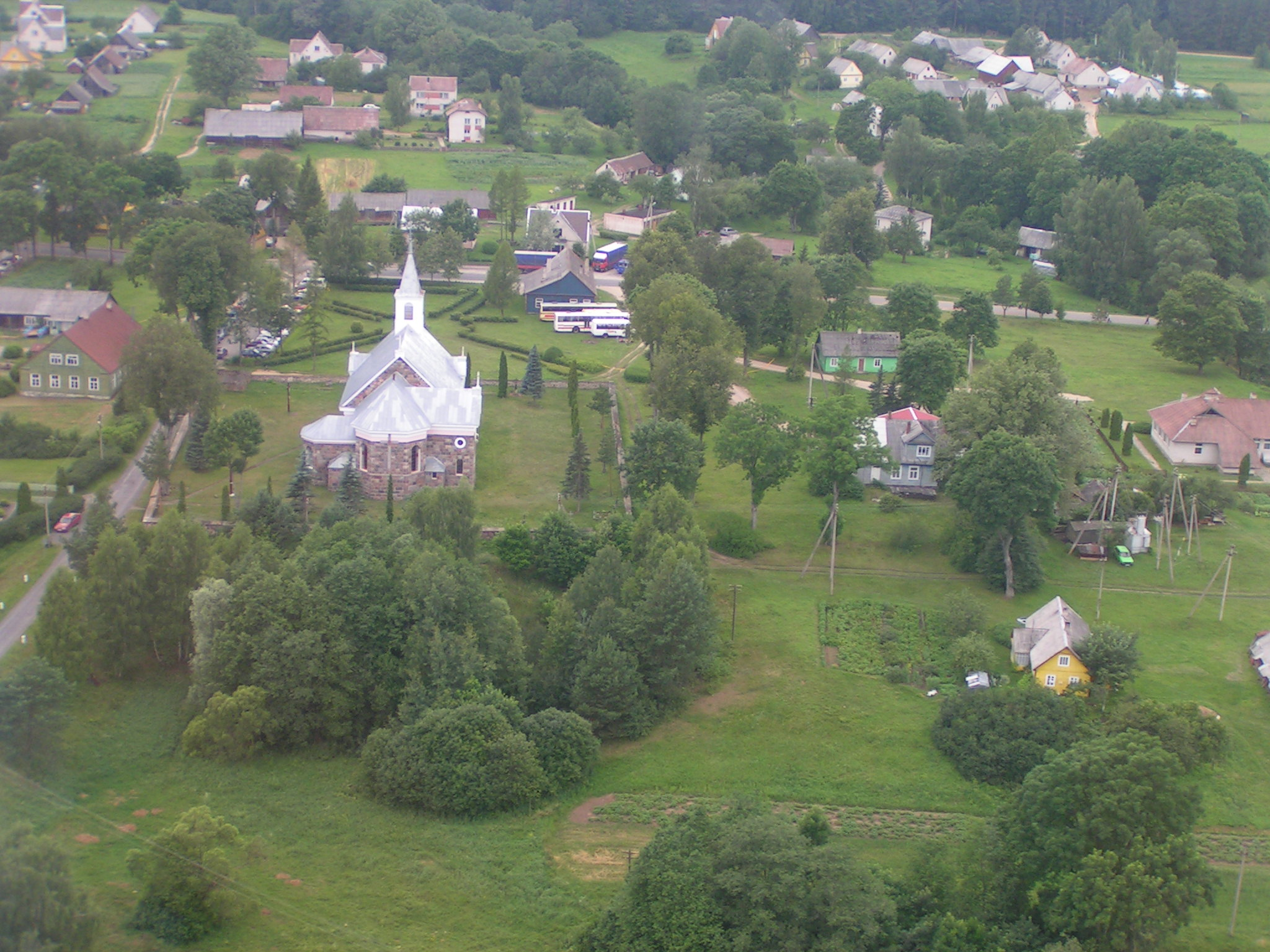

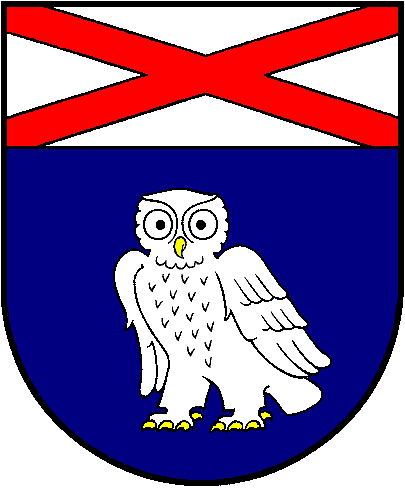
- Coat of arms

- Location within Lithuania
- Coordinates: 55°35′50″N 25°02′40″E
- Country: Lithuania
- County: Utena County
- Municipality: Anykščiai

Population (2011)
  - Total: 229
- Time zone: UTC+2 (EET)
  - Summer (DST): UTC+3 (EEST)

Andrioniškis is a town in Anykščiai District Municipality, in Utena County, in northeast Lithuania. According to the 2011 census, the town has a population of 229 people. Town established near Šventoji River. Andrioniškis name was first mentioned in 1672.

Domicėlė Tarabildienė, a graphical artist, was born in Andrioniškis in 1912.
