= Debeikiai =

- Town
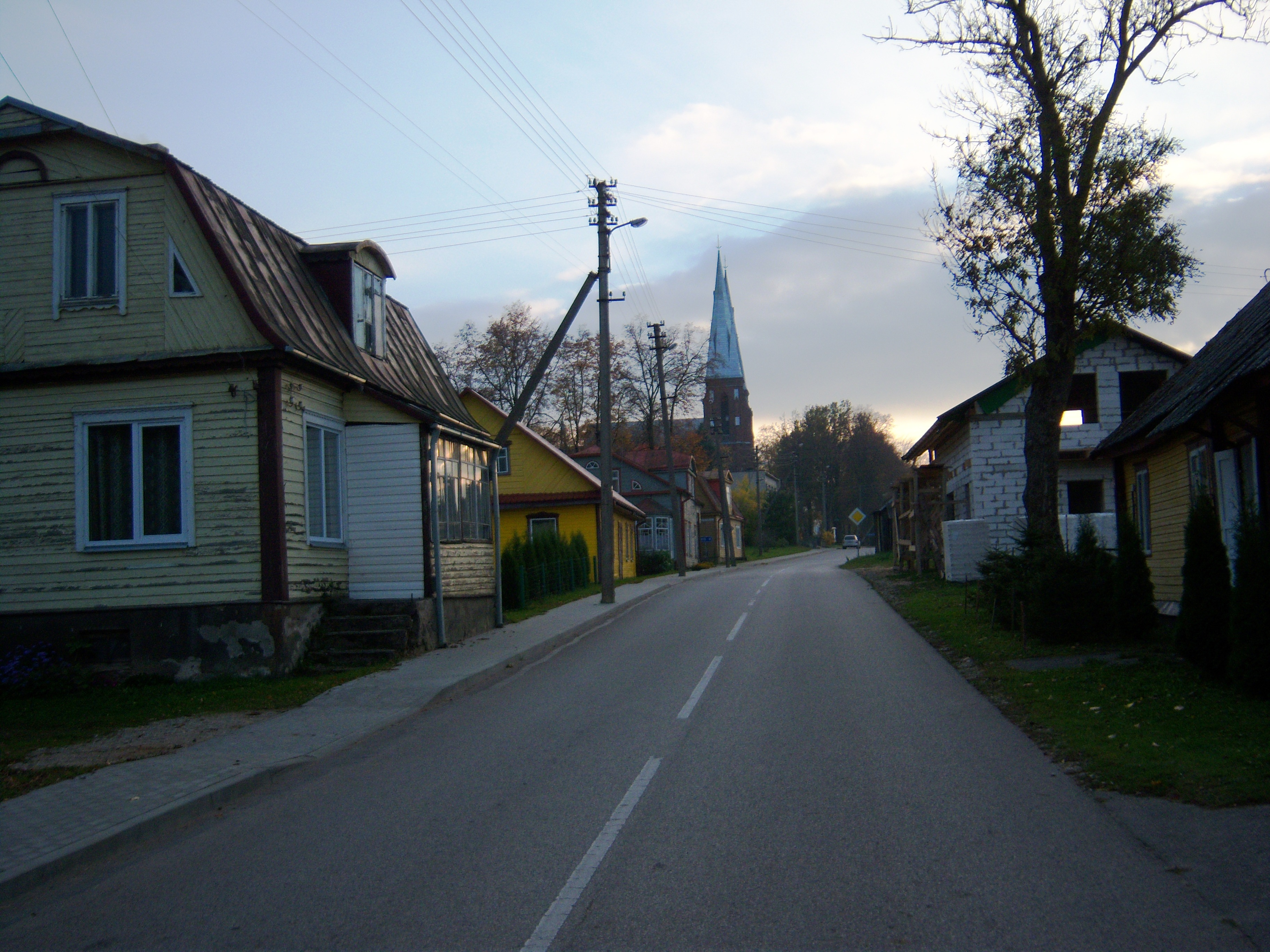

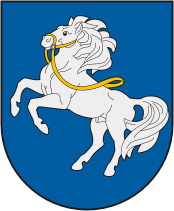
- Coat of arms

- Location within Lithuania
- Coordinates: 55°34′50″N 25°19′20″E
- Country: Lithuania
- County: Utena County
- Municipality: Anykščiai

Population (2011)
  - Total: 404
- Time zone: UTC+2 (EET)
  - Summer (DST): UTC+3 (EEST)

Debeikiai is a town in Anykščiai district municipality, in Utena County, in northeast Lithuania. According to the 2011 census, the town has a population of 404 people. Town established near Anykšta river.

== Education ==
- Debeikiai primary school

== Famous citizens ==
- Jurgis Baranauskas (1859–1941), book smuggler.
