= Viešintos =

- Town
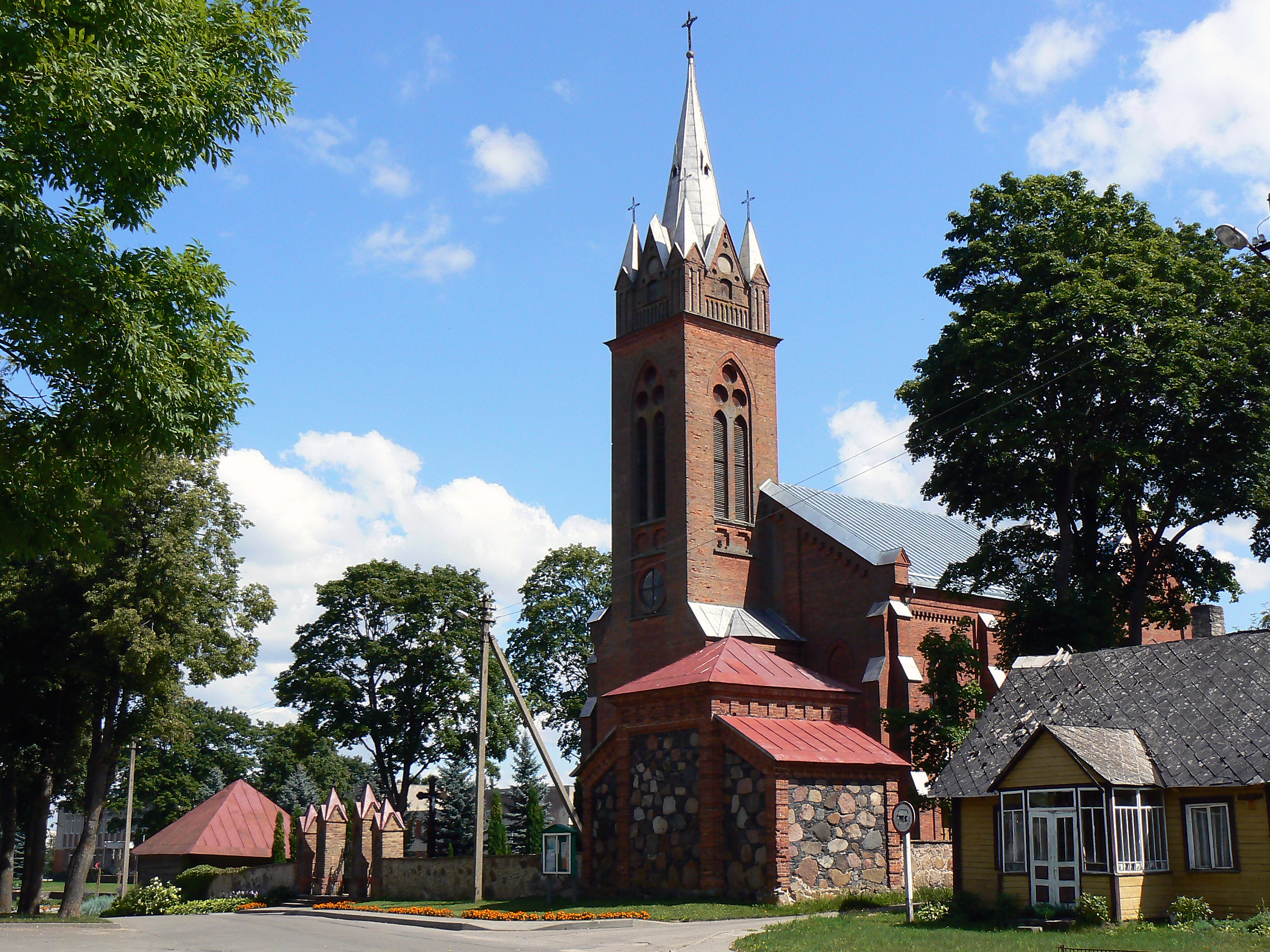
- St. Michael the Archangel Church

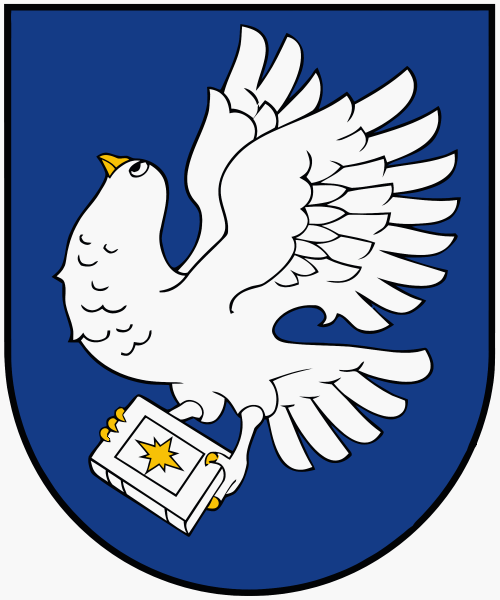
- Coat of arms

- Location within Lithuania
- Coordinates: 55°41′20″N 24°59′30″E
- Country: Lithuania
- County: Utena County
- Municipality: Anykščiai

Population (2011)
  - Total: 281
- Time zone: UTC+2 (EET)
  - Summer (DST): UTC+3 (EEST)

Viešintos is a town in Anykščiai district municipality, in Utena County, in northeast Lithuania. According to the 2011 census, the town has a population of 281 people. Town established near Viešinta river.

== Etymology ==
Viešintos is a hydronymic place name - the town is named after the river Viešinta, whose source is located near the town. In other languages, the town is known as: Polish: Wieszynty

== History ==
The Viešintos manor has been mentioned since the 16th century. In 1591, its owner Francas Kulvietis was granted the privilege to establish a town and to organise a market, and in the course of a few centuries the town of Viešintos overtook the nearby rival town of Jurgiškis. In 1734, 33 families lived in the town. The first church was built in 1787. The Kaunas Governorate archives mention that in 1853 Viešintos manor with 191 serfs belonged to Pranciškus Krasauskas. Then, until the beginning of the 20th century, Viešintai manor belonged to the Petkevičius and Komar families, and after the death of its last owner, Antanas Komaras, it was mortgaged to the Vilnius Land Bank. In 1902 a primary school was founded. After the restoration of Lithuania in 1918, there were 2 mills, a dairy, a small credit union, and a branch of the Lithuanian Riflemen's Union. At the time, about 30 Jewish families lived in Viešintos, a synagogue was built before World War II, but demolished by the Soviet government around 1962. From 1941 to 1951 the Soviet occupation authorities deported 28 residents of Viešintos.

On 07.07.1941, on the orders of the Nazi occupation authorities, most of the Jews of Viešintos were executed in the Kupiškis Freemasons' Cemetery. After World War II, Lithuanian partisans of the Šarūnas detachment of Dainava military district were active in the area. The coat of arms of the town was adopted in 2006 by the decree of the President of the Republic of Lithuania.

== Buildings and structures ==
- 246 metres tall guyed mast for FM-/TV-broadcasting
