= Svėdasai =

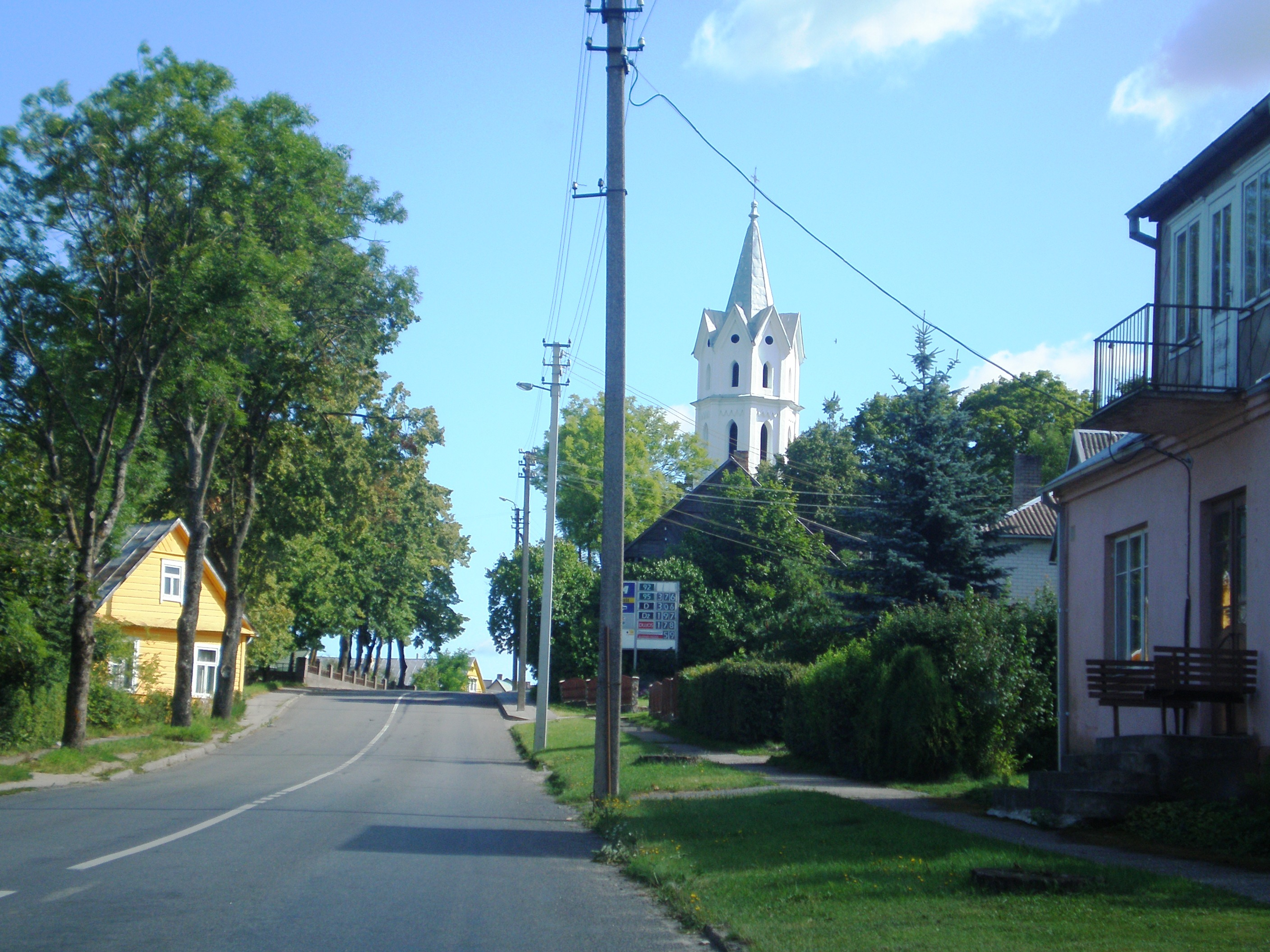

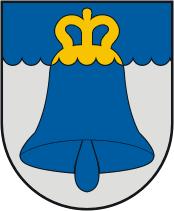
- Coat of arms

- Location of Svėdasai
- Coordinates: 55°40′0″N 25°22′0″E
- Country: Lithuania
- Ethnographic region: Aukštaitija
- County: Utena County
- Municipality: Anykščiai district municipality
- Eldership: Svėdasai eldership
- Capital of: Svėdasai eldership

Population (2011)
  - Total: 884
- Time zone: UTC+2 (EET)
  - Summer (DST): UTC+3 (EEST)

Svėdasai is a town in Utena County in the northern part of Lithuania, bearing a name from a nearby Lake Svėdasas.

== History ==
The name according to Kazimieras Būga is of Selonian origin. In July 1941, 245 to 386 people were murdered in a mass execution near Svėdasai most must have been Jews.

== Gallery ==
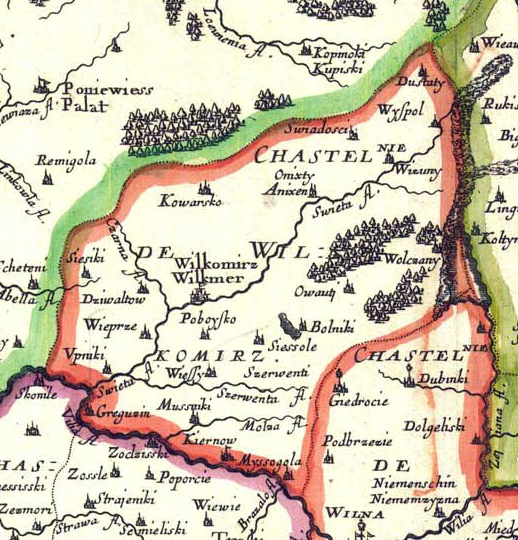
Svėdasai (Swiadosci) marked in Nicolas Sanson map (1665)

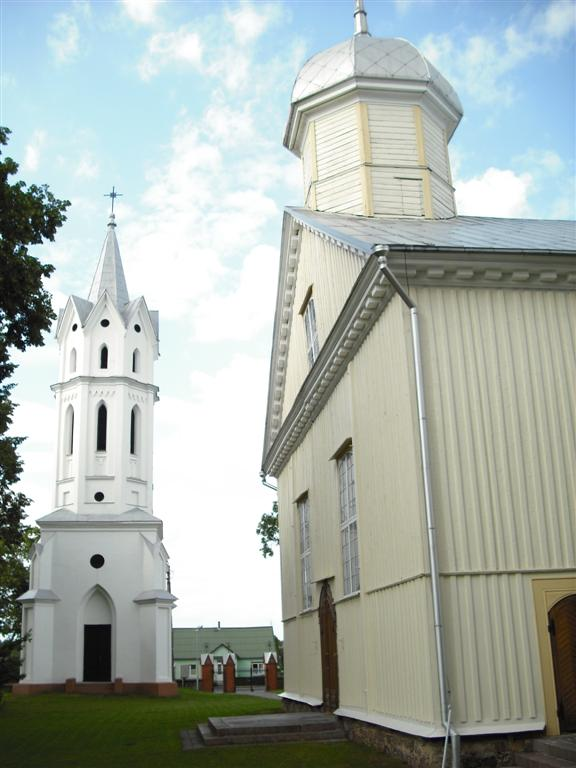
St. Michael the Archangel Church

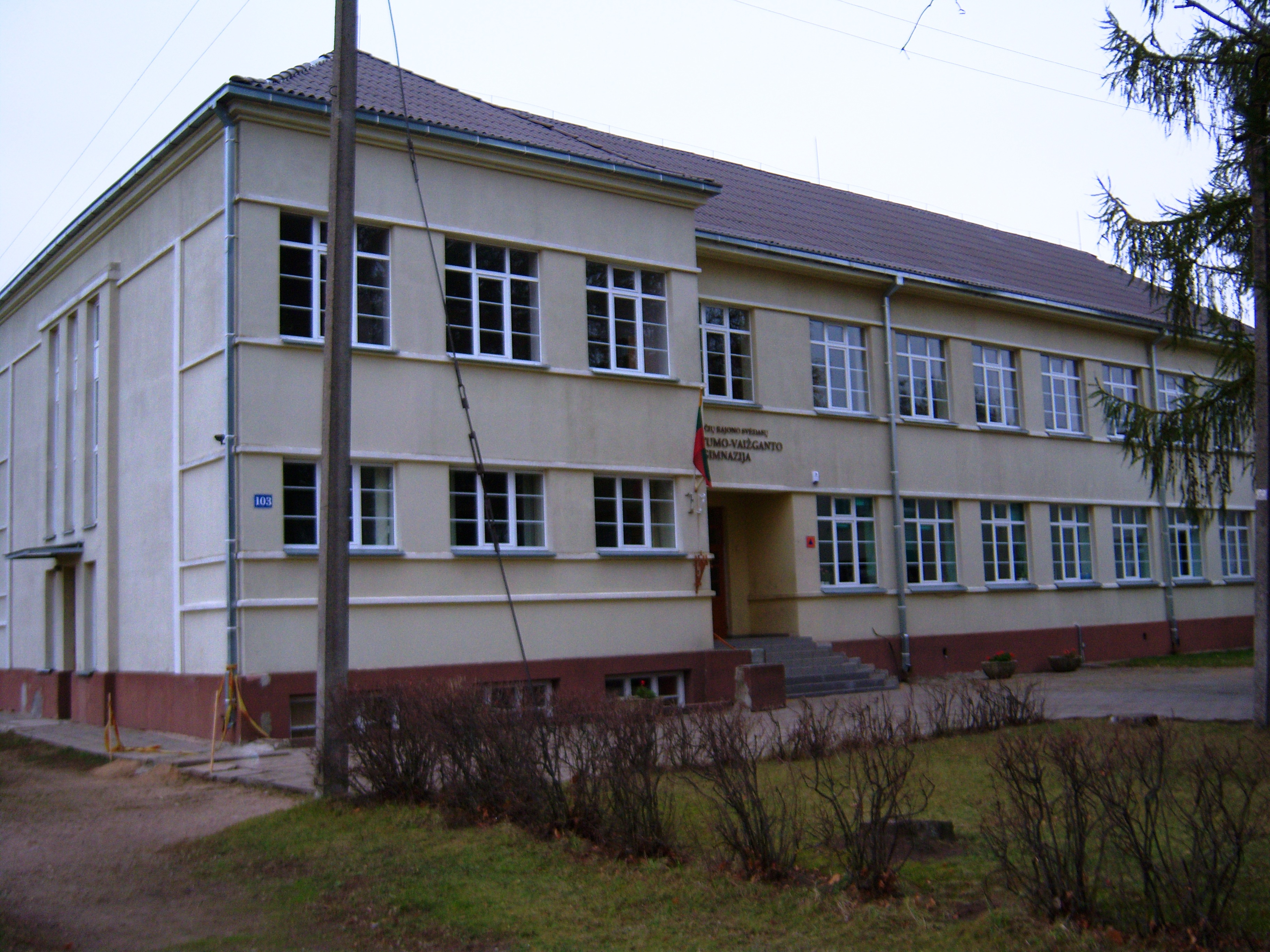
Juozas Tumas-Vaižgantas gymnasium

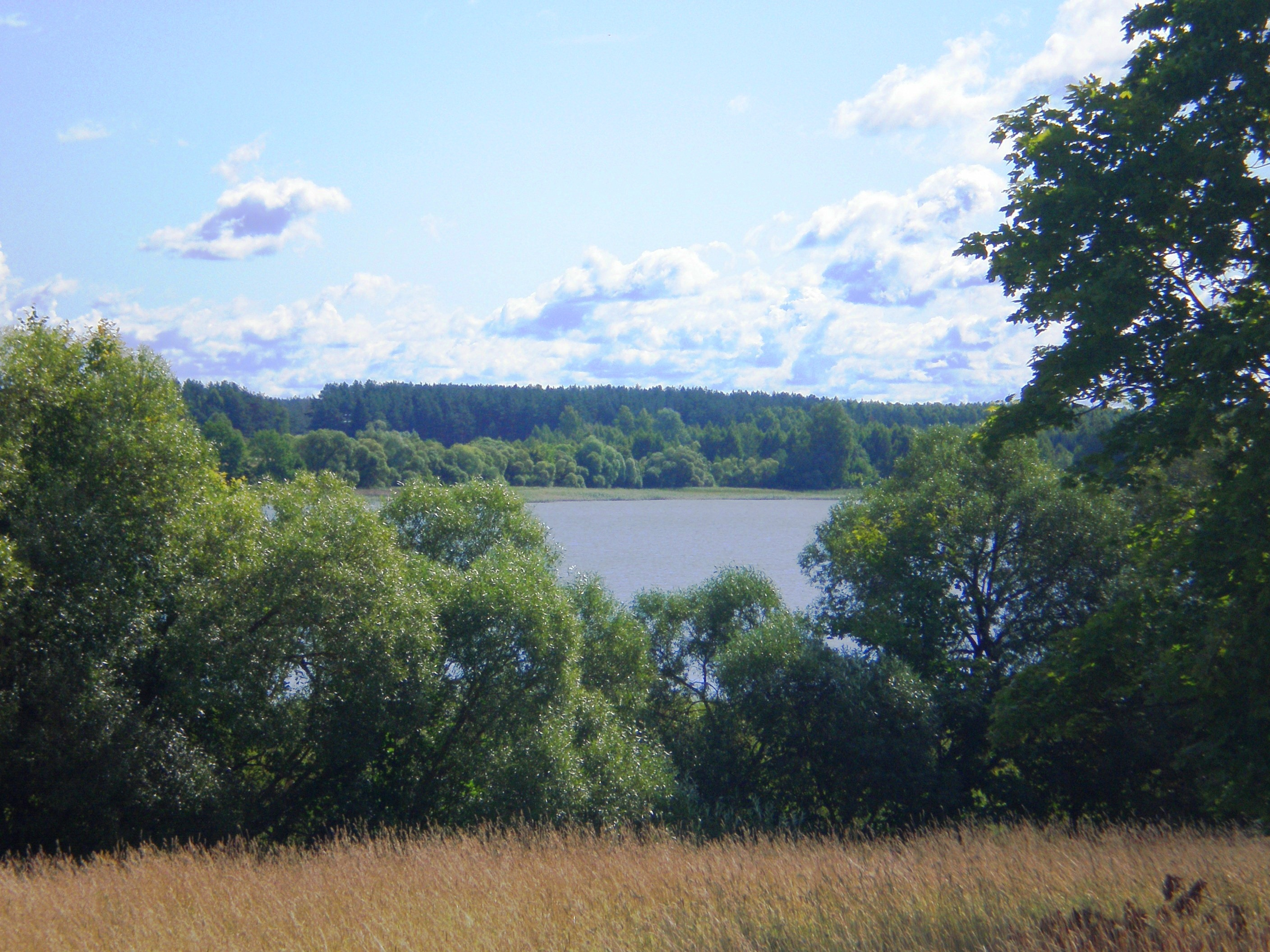
Alaušas lake
