= Anykščiai District Municipality =

Anykščiai District Municipality Anykščių rajono savivaldybė
- District Municipality
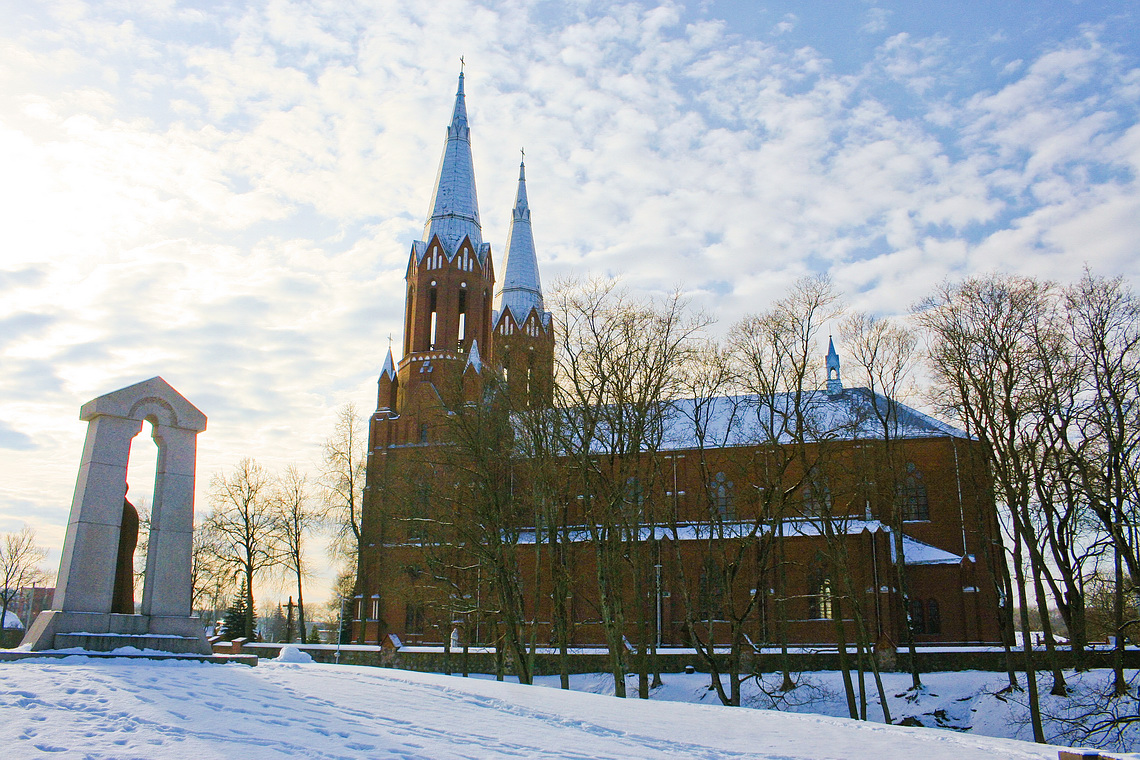

- Flag Coat of arms Brandmark

- Location of Anykščiai District Municipality within Lithuania

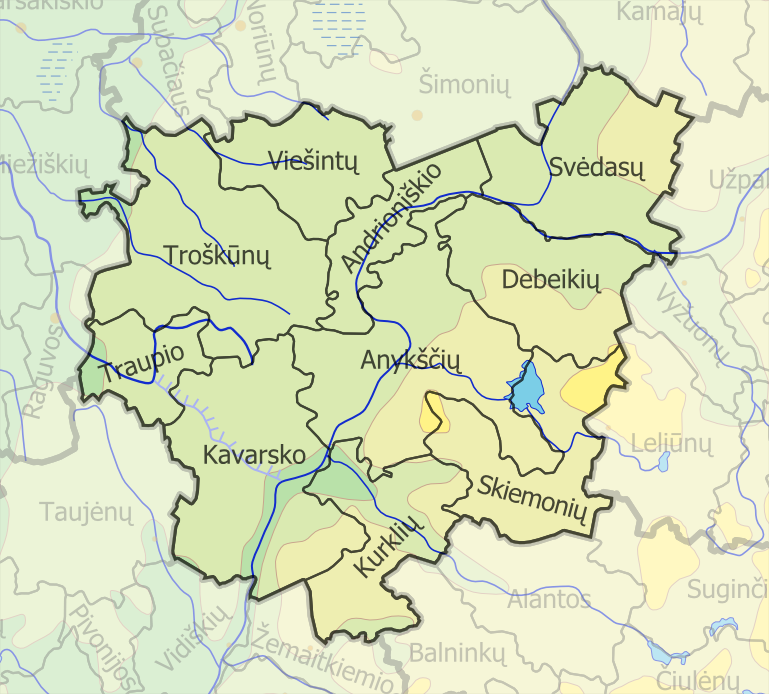
- Location of Anykščiai District
- Coordinates: 55°32′11″N 25°6′38″E
- Country: Lithuania
- Region: Aukštaitija
- County: Utena County
- Established: 1950 (76 years ago)
- Capital: Anykščiai
- Elderships: 10

Government
  - Type: City Council
  - Body: Anykščiai District Council
  - Mayor: Kęstutis Tubis (LVŽS)
  - Leading: Farmers and Greens Union 8 / 25

Area
  - Total: 1,764 km^{2} (681 sq mi)
  - Rank: 6th
- Elevation: 194 m (636 ft)

Population (2022)
  - Total: 22,683
  - Rank: 36th
  - Density: 12.86/km^{2} (33.3/sq mi)
  - Rank: 55th
- Time zone: UTC+2 (EET)
  - Summer (DST): UTC+3 (EEST)
- ZIP Codes: 29015–29374
- Phone code: +370 (381)
- Website: www.anyksciai.lt

Anykščiai District Municipality is one of 60 municipalities in Lithuania.

== Structure ==
District structure:

- 3 cities – Anykščiai, Kavarskas and Troškūnai;
- 8 towns – Andrioniškis, Debeikiai, Kurkliai, Skiemonys, Surdegis, Svėdasai, Traupis and Viešintos;
- 758 villages.

Biggest population (2001):

- Anykščiai – 11958
- Svėdasai – 1002
- Kavarskas – 809
- Naujieji Elmininkai – 696
- Troškūnai – 525
- Kurkliai – 474
- Ažuožeriai – 452
- Debeikiai – 452
- Aknystos – 441
- Raguvėlė – 398

== Elderships ==
Anykščiai District Municipality is divided into 10 elderships:

| Eldership (Administrative Center) | Area | Population (2021) |
|---|---|---|
| Andrioniškis (Andrioniškis) | 92.59 km^{2} (22,879.49 acres; 35.75 sq mi) | 413 |
| Anykščiai (Anykščiai) | 271.06 km^{2} (66,980.38 acres; 104.66 sq mi) | 11,993 |
| Debeikiai (Debeikiai) | 172 km^{2} (42,502.13 acres; 66.41 sq mi) | 1,458 |
| Kavarskas (Kavarskas) | 256 km^{2} (63,258.98 acres; 98.84 sq mi) | 2,361 |
| Kurkliai (Kurkliai) | 146 km^{2} (36,077.39 acres; 56.37 sq mi) | 1,015 |
| Skiemonys (Skiemonys) | 142.48 km^{2} (35,207.57 acres; 55.01 sq mi) | 880 |
| Svėdasai (Svėdasai) | 187 km^{2} (46,208.71 acres; 72.20 sq mi) | 1,761 |
| Traupis (Traupis) | 75 km^{2} (18,532.90 acres; 28.96 sq mi) | 569 |
| Troškūnai (Troškūnai) | 292 km^{2} (72,154.77 acres; 112.74 sq mi) | 2,214 |
| Viešintos (Viešintos) | 112 km^{2} (27,675.80 acres; 43.24 sq mi) | 657 |

== See also ==
- Horse Museum (Lithuania)
