= Rubikiai Lake =

Lake in Lithuania

Rubikiai
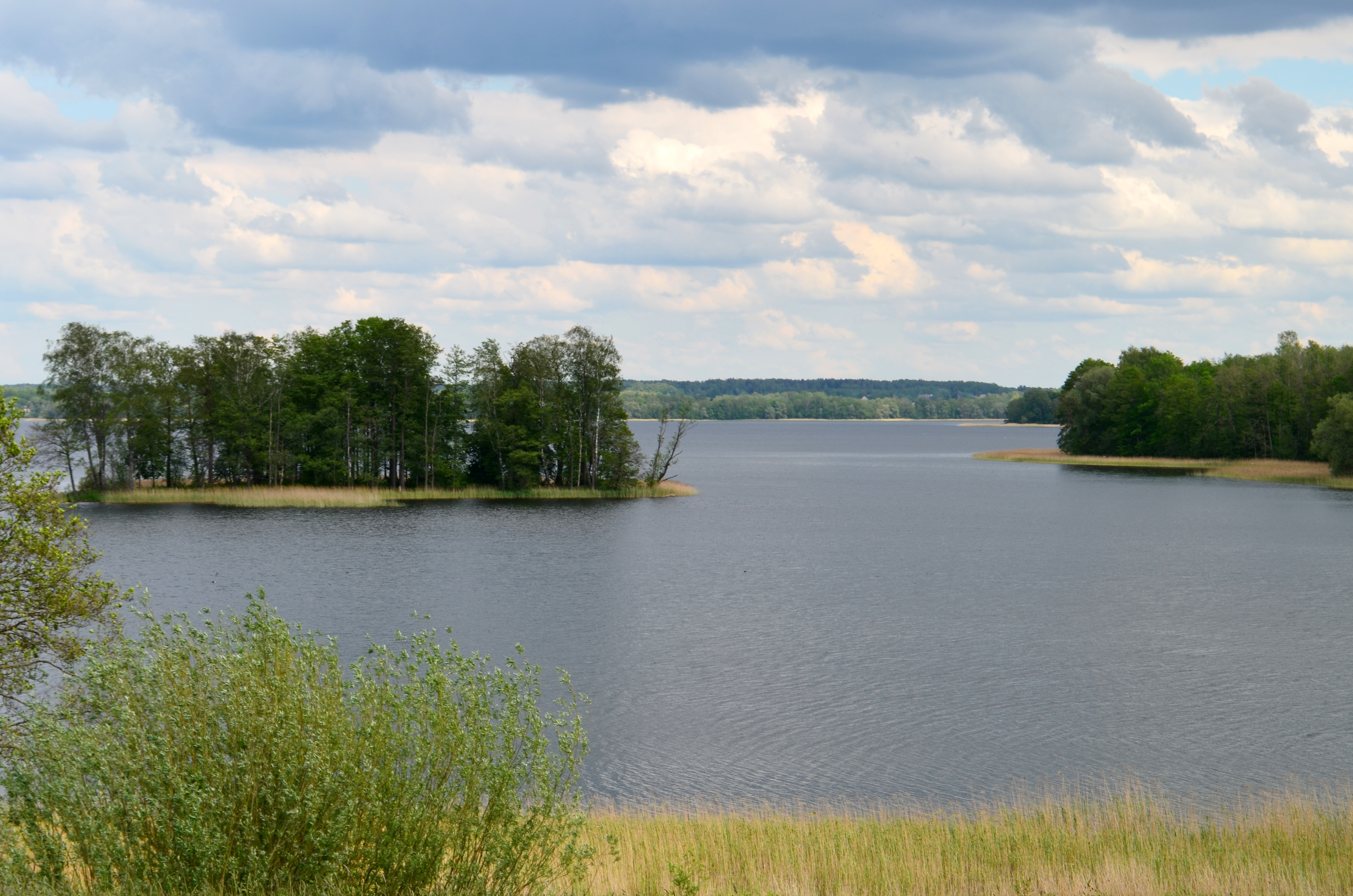
- Western side of the lake

- Location within Lithuania
- Location: Anykščiai district municipality
- Coordinates: 55°30′22″N 25°16′59″E
- Type: natural
- Primary outflows: Anykšta rivulet
- Basin countries: Lithuania
- Surface area: 9.4 km^{2} (3.6 mi^{2})
- Average depth: 5.7 m (19 ft)
- Max. depth: 16 m (52 ft)
- Shore length^{1}: 24 km (15 mi)
- Islands: 13-16 (Pertako, Bučinė, Aukštoji, Česnakinė, Liepinė, Didžioji)
- Settlements: Rubikiai
- ^{1} Shore length is not a well-defined measure.

Lake Rubikiai is a lake in Anykščiai district municipality, Lithuania. It is famous for its 13 (or 16) islands (Pertako, Bučinė, Aukštoji, Česnakinė, Liepinė, Didžioji, and others) that cover 1.1 square kilometres (0.42 sq mi). Among the settlements located on the shores of the lake, Rubikiai village is the largest. Anykšta rivulet, the namesake of Anykščiai and left tributary of Šventoji River, flows from the lake. In 1960 Lake Rubikiai was declared a landscape reserve and now is part of Anykščiai Regional Park. There are several campsites where tourists are welcome to put up tents or rent kayaks. Every year since 1984 Lake Rubikiai hosts a regatta on the Joninės day.
