= Horse Museum (Lithuania) =

Ethnographic and equestrian regional museum

Coordinates: 55°34′25″N 25°05′08″E

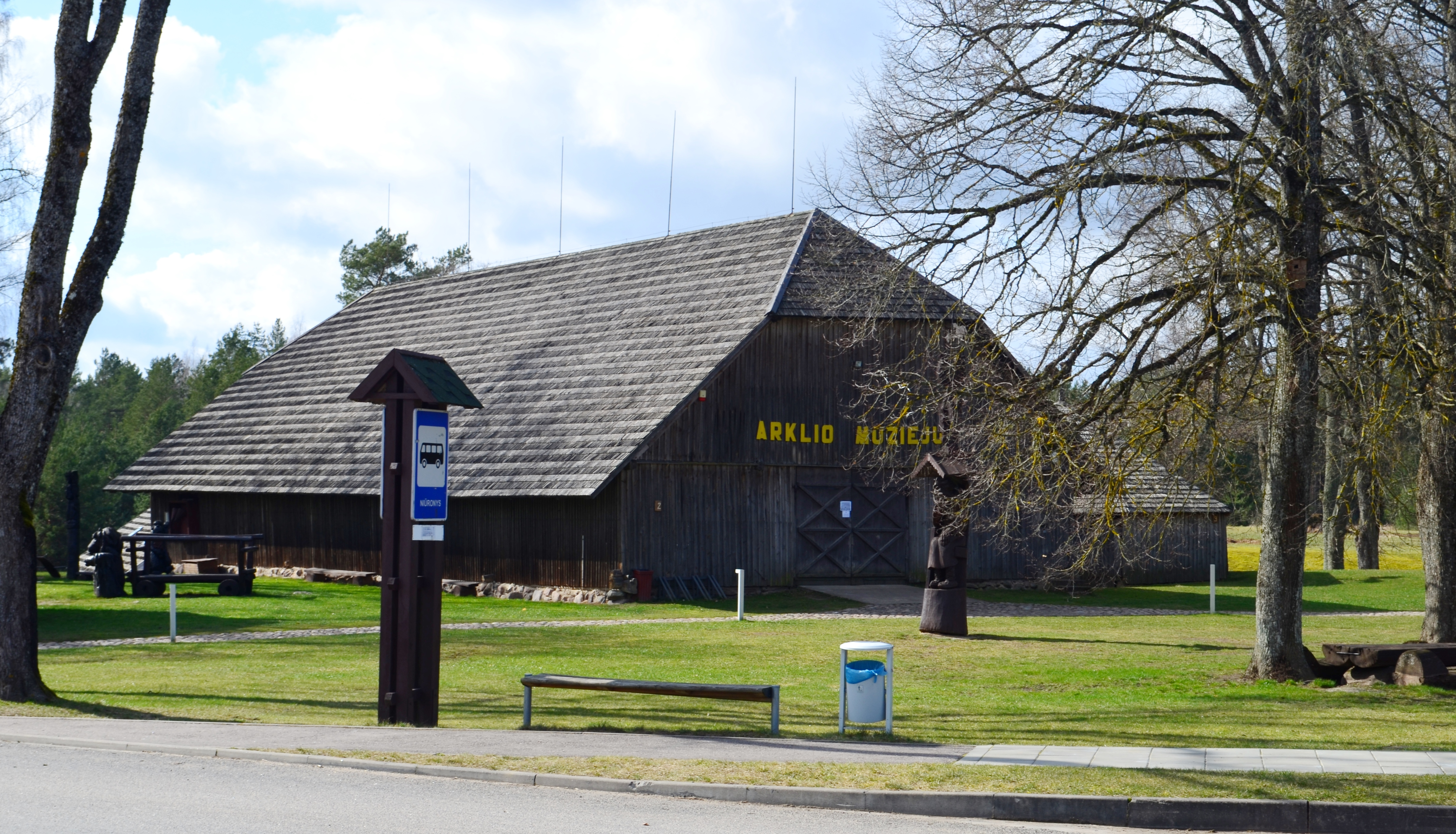
Horse Museum

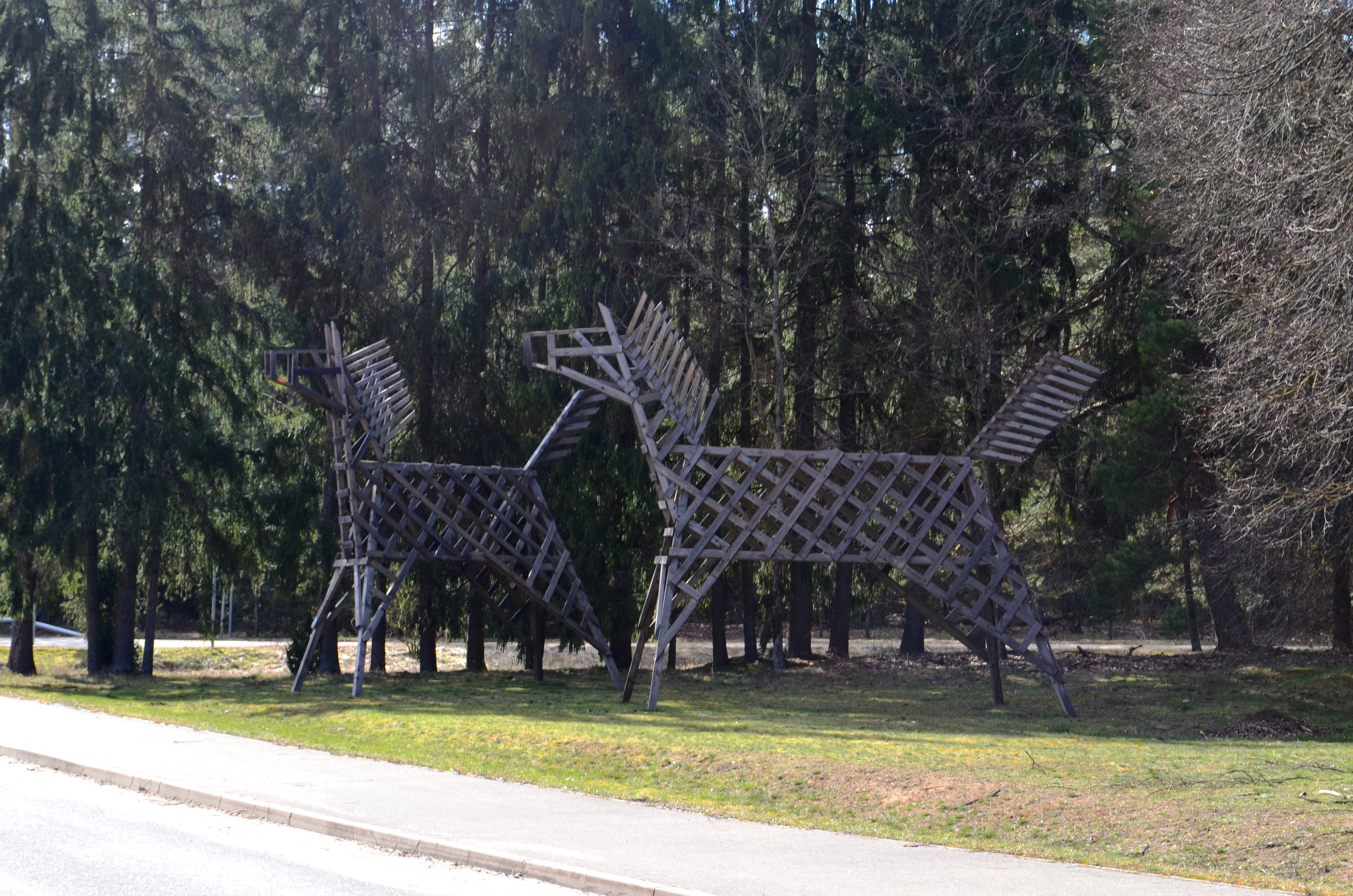
Wooden horses by the museum

The Lithuanian Horse Museum (Lithuanian: Arklio muziejus) is an ethnographic and equestrian regional museum dedicated to the historical use of horses in the agriculture of Lithuania. It is located in the village of Niūronys, Anykščiai District, Lithuania. It is situated about 6.5 kilometres (4.0 mi) north of Anykščiai within the Anykščiai Regional Park. Since 1992, it is a branch of the A. Baranauskas and A. Žukauskas-Vienuolis Memorial Museum.

== Background ==
The Horse Museum was opened for visitors in 1978 by professor and agronomist Petras Vasinauskas. He nurtured the idea of the museum since 1940. In 1975, Vasinauskas realized that horses were being replaced by machinery and thus no longer valued in Soviet collective farming. To raise awareness of this issue, Vasinauskas together with a journalist traveled more than 1,500 kilometres (930 mi) across Lithuania in a horse cart. As news about the museum spread, farmers started bringing various items and even live horses to the museum.

== Description ==
The museum stores about 4,000 exhibits. It includes horse-drawn agricultural implements (harrows, mowers, etc.), means of transportation (carts, sledges) and their parts, and work tools of various crafts (reenacting pre-modern works of a weaver, potter, baker, blacksmith, jeweler and wood carver). Most of the exhibits date to the 19th and 20th centuries and were collected in Lithuania. The museum also exhibits written documents, postal stamps, wood carvings, etc.

In 1988, a 12-kilometre (7.5 mi) trail was constructed for recreational rides. Every summer since 1978, a cultural and sports festival "Run, Run, Horses" (Lithuanian: Bėk, bėk, žirgeli) is held at the Niūronys hippodrome.

The museum has 11 buildings as well as live stables. More than 35,000 tourists visit the museum annually. The museum also offers horseback and sleigh rides.
