= Józef Abelewicz =

Lithuanian and Polish Catholic priest (1821–1882)

Józef Abelewicz Jonas Juozapas Abelevičius
- Born: March 17, 1821; Anykščiai, Russian Empire (now Lithuania)
- Died: July 3, 1882 (aged 61); Vilnius, Russian Empire (now Lithuania)
- Parents: Vincentas Abelevičius (father); Ona Rukšaitė-Abelevičienė (mother)

Józef Abelewicz (Lithuanian: Jonas Juozapas Abelevičius; 17 March 1821 – 3 July 1882) was a Lithuanian Roman Catholic priest. He was a professor of theology in Vilnius.

Vaclovas Biržiška includes the person in his book "Aleksandrynas: biographies, bibliographies and bio-bibliographies of old Lithuanian writers who wrote before 1865". As a writer, he wrote sermons and edited the writings of the Lithuanian bishop Motiejus Valančius.

He was praised by the Polish priest Czesław Falkowski for his exemplary knowledge of the Polish language and for his stance against Russification.

== Biography ==
=== Early life ===
He was born on March 17, 1821, in the Anykščiai parish, Ukmergė County to Vincentas Abelevičius (Wincenty Abelewicz) and Ona Rukšaitė-Abelevičienė (Anna z Bukszów, 1791–?). He was born into a peasant family, although he claimed to be of noble origin and was considered by others as such. Still, the Polish priest Czesław Falkowski and Lithuanian museum curator Tautvydas Kontrimavičius wrote that he was of noble origin. He had four siblings: brothers Florijonas Ignotas Abelevičius (1828–?), Konstantinas Juozapas Abelevičius (1834–?) and sisters Karolina Uršulė Ona Abelevičiūtė-Šidlauskienė (1823–?), Angelė Ona Abelevičiūtė-Bražinskienė (1826–?).

=== Education ===
In 1833–1838, he studied at the local school in Troškūnai, where he finished five classes. Then, in 1838–1842, he studied at the Vilnius Theological Seminary. Since 1842, he continued his studies at the Roman Catholic Spiritual Academy which was moved that year from Vilnius to Saint Petersburg. According to the Lithuanian historian Vytautas Jogėla, he was one of two clerics admitted to the academy that year who were of peasant origin. He was one of the most talented students there.

He graduated from it in 1846 with the degree of Master of Theology. On April 6, 1846, Abelevičius was ordained a priest in Saint Petersburg. In 1846–47, he worked as a chaplain of the Svislach Gymnasium.

=== Vilnius (1847–1853) ===
He was the procurator, lecturer and professor of dogmatics at the Vilnius Theological Seminary in 1847–53. He was also a prosecutor (economist). In 1850–53, in the very first years of the episcopate of Motiejus Valančius as Bishop of Samogitia, he oversaw the printing of Lithuanian texts published in Vilnius, was their proofreader and corrected the language.

In 1852, he was nominated as a canon by the Bishop of Vilnius Wacław Żyliński (Vaclovas Žilinskis) and appointed canon-coadjutor of the Vilnius Cathedral Chapter.

=== Vawkavysk (1853–1870) ===
From 1853 he was dean and administrator of the Vawkavysk parish. Then, in 1856–70, he became also Vawkawysk's parish priest. On 19 September 1867, he was fined 100 rubles by the governor of Grodno for allowing another priest Šarskis to offer Holy Mass without the knowledge of the authorities.

=== Vilnius (1870–1882) ===
In 1870, he returned to Vilnius, until 1878 he was the inspector of the Vilnius Diocesan Seminary and professor of homiletics.

In 1872–78, he taught also the Holy Scripture and, since 1878, ecclesiastical law.

On July 30, 1878, he became the rector of the Vilnius Diocesan Seminary. This was because the previous priest Motiejus Harasimovičius (Maciej Harasimowicz) was removed by the Imperial Russian government. Harasimovičius was dismissed from his position as rector in May 1878, due to the fact that for several days he had omitted the prayers for the Emperor of Russia during Holy Mass in the Vilnius Cathedral.

From 1878 until the end of his life on July 3, 1882, when he died of apoplexy, he was the rector of the Vilnius Priests' Seminary and at the same time he taught ecclesiastical law. In the Polish Biographical Dictionary, the Polish priest Czesław Falkowski claimed that he was of noble origin and wrote that:

In the then difficult positions of inspector and rector of the Theological Seminary, he was universally loved and appreciated as a true father of seminarians and a wise guide. He lectured clearly, precisely and in exemplary Polish. He contributed to the improvement of the Theological Seminary and maintaining the ecclesiastical and anti-Russification spirit during the gloomy period of Żyliński's rule.

He was awarded the Cross and Medal for the commemoration of the Crimean War of 1853–1856.

== Sources ==
- anykstenai.lt (2025-02-25). "Jonas Juozapas ABELEVIČIUS" (in Lithuanian). Anykštėnų biografijų žinynas.
- Biržiška, Vaclovas (1965). Aleksandrynas: senųjų lietuvių rašytojų, rašiusių prieš 1865 m., biografijos, bibliografijos ir biobibliografijos (in Lithuanian). Vol. 3: XIX century. Chicago: M. Morkūno spaustuvė.
- Falkowski, Czesław (1935). "Józef Abelewicz". Polski Słownik Biograficzny (in Polish). Vol. I. Kraków.
- Jackiewicz, M. (2013). "Poczet twórców literatury wileńskiej od wieku XVI do roku 1945 – 1" (PDF). Znad Wilii (in Polish). 1 (53).
- Jogėla, Vytautas (1997). "Vilniaus Romos katalikų dvasinė akademija 1833–1842 metals: organizacija ir veikla" (PDF). Lietuvių Atgimimo Istorijos Studijos (in Lithuanian). 14. Vilnius: Eugrimas.
- Paulauskytė, Teresė (2019). "Jonas Juozapas Abelevičius". Universal Lithuanian Encyclopedia (in Lithuanian).
- Žaltauskaitė, Vilma (2018). "Vyskupo kontrolės laikas: Vilniaus vyskupijos vyskupas ir dvasininkai 1883–1885" (PDF). Bažnyčios Istorijos Studijos (in Lithuanian). IX. Vilnius: Lietuvių Katalikų Mokslo Akademijos Metraštis. ISSN 1392-0502.
