= Ažuožeriai =

- Village
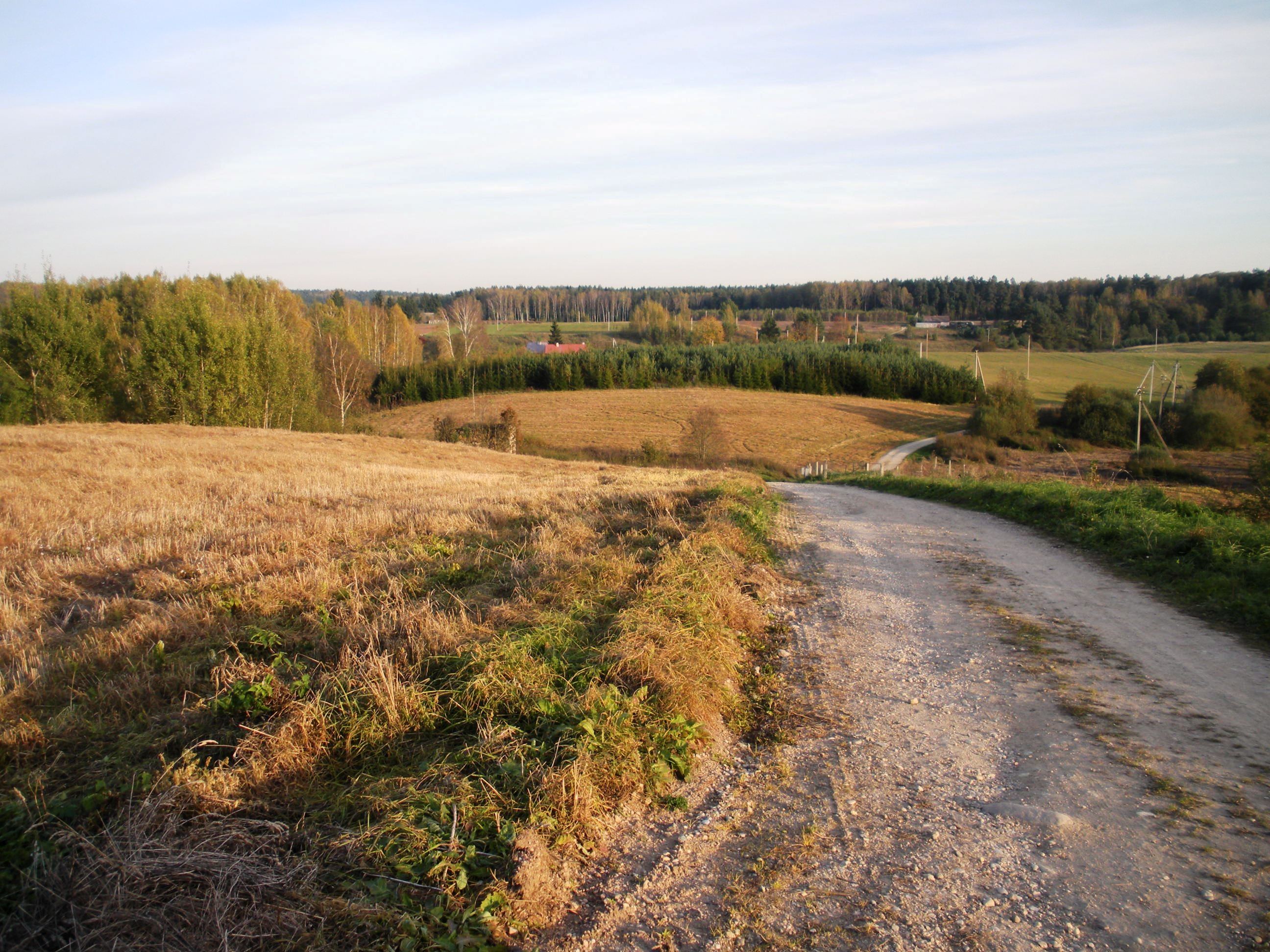
- Sky-watcher's Hill

- Location within Lithuania
- Coordinates: 55°30′10″N 25°02′00″E
- Country: Lithuania
- County: Utena County
- Municipality: Anykščiai district municipality
- Eldership: Anykščiai eldership

Population (2011)
  - Total: 383
- Time zone: UTC+2 (EET)
  - Summer (DST): UTC+3 (EEST)

Ažuožeriai (or Užuožeriai) is a village in Anykščiai district municipality, in Utena County, in northeast Lithuania. According to the 2011 census, the village has a population of 383 people.

Prevailing agricultural branch of local farming is gardening. Surroundings feature wood carvings commemorating spot of writer A. Vienuolis' native homestead and his creative folk heroes of stargazer Šmukštaras, drowned myrmidon Veronika.

Nearby- Ilgis Lake, Šventoji River, Queen's Quagmire, Brother of Puntukas Stone.

== Famous villagers ==
- Antanas Vienuolis (1882–1957), writer
- Janina Cibienė (1932–2003), writer
