= Elme =

Elme may refer to:

- Elmė, a river in Lithuania
- Elme Marie Caro, French philosopher
- Elme de Villiers, South African female badminton player
- Charles Elmé Francatelli, British chef
- Ida Saint-Elme, name used by Maria Versfelt
