= Gražutė Regional Park =

Park in northeast Lithuania

Coordinates: 55.63°N 26.13°E

Gražutė Regional Park is a park in northeast Lithuania. Established in 1992, it has an area of 29,741 hectares.

About 20% of its territory consists of lakes, including Lake Šventas, Lake Samanis and Lake Luodis, and wetlands; forests cover about 55% of the land. Several villages that include sites with architectural and historical value are located within the park.

The Šventoji, which is the longest river that flows entirely within Lithuania and the largest tributary of the Neris, originates from Lake Samanis in the Gražutė Regional Park.
