= Anykšta =

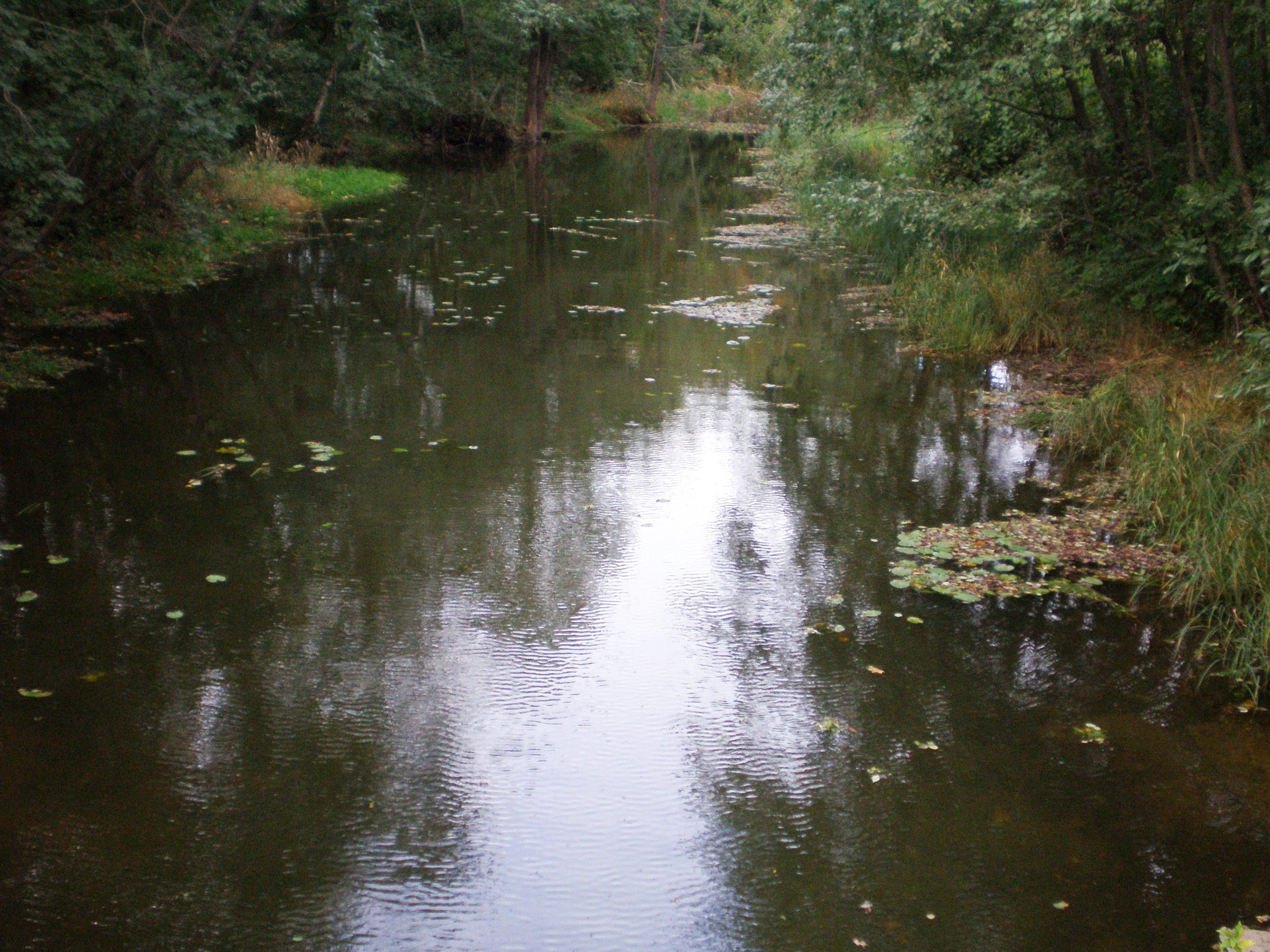
- The Anykšta near its source

Location
- Country: Lithuania
- Location: Anykščiai district municipality, Utena County

Physical characteristics
- Source
  - location: Rubikiai Lake
- Mouth
  - coordinates: 55.5312°N 25.1131°E
- Length: 13.8 km (8.6 mi)
- Basin size: 144.9 km^{2} (55.9 sq mi)
- Discharge
  - average: 1.18 m^{3}/s

Basin features
- Progression: Šventoji→ Neris→ Neman→ Baltic Sea

The Anykšta is a river of Anykščiai district municipality, Utena County, in northeastern Lithuania. It flows for 13.8 kilometres and has a basin area of 144.9 km^{2}.

The Anykšta is a left-bank tributary of the Šventoji, joining it in the town of Anykščiai.

The name Anykšta is of unknown origin. According to one theory, it could have been derived from Proto-Indoeuropean root *an-/*en- related to water.

It could also be cognate to Proto-Slavic *oněxъ ("their"), genitive plural case of *onъ/*ona/*ono ("he/she/it" respectively). Also, compare the name of the Šventoji river or the Saint river, what can besides indicate a territory mark.
