= Aukštaitija narrow gauge railway =

Coordinates: 55.745198°N 24.354678°E

Aukštaitijos narrow gauge railway Tourist train Panevėžys–Rubikiai
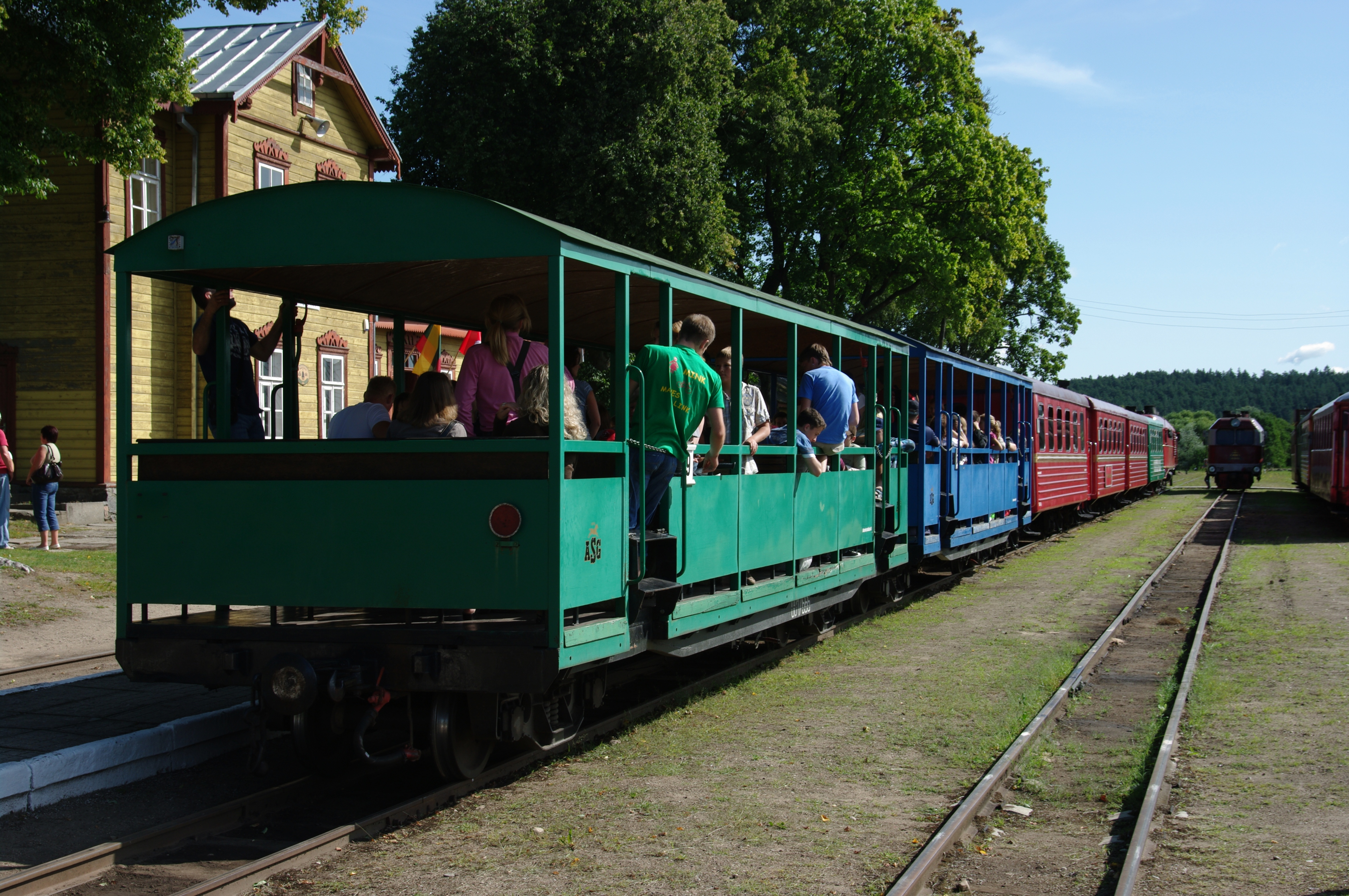
- Tourist train Track layout in 2016

Technical
- Line length: 68.4 kilometres (42.5 mi)
- Track gauge: 750 mm (2 ft 5 1/2 in)

The Aukštaitijos narrow gauge railway (Lithuanian Aukštaitijos siaurasis geležinkelis for Aukštaitija narrow gauge railway) is a 68.4 kilometres (42.5 mi) long tourist railway from Panevėžys to Rubikiai in Lithuania with a gauge of 750 mm (2 ft 5 1/2 in).

== History ==
The narrow gauge railway was built from 1891 with a gauge of 750 mm (2 ft 5 1/2 in). The first section was completed on 11 November 1895 from Švenčionėliai to Pastovai and extended in 1898 up to Panevėžys. Regular passenger and goods traffic commenced in autumn 1899. Initially, there were 2 depots, 14 stations, 15 locomotives, 58 passenger carriages of various types, 6 postal carriages as well as 112 covered and 154 open goods waggons. In 1903 approximately 65,000 tons of goods and 40,632 passengers were transported. Panevėžys became a regional centre during Lithuania's independence (1920-1938), and thus a lot of raw materials such as coal, oil, sand, salt and fertilizer were transported as well as agricultural produce such as flax, bacon, sugar, grain, flour and timber.

The German army built during World War I two Heeresfeldbahn track extensions in 1916 from Gubernija to Pasvalys and from Joniškis to Žeimelis with a gauge of 600 mm (1 ft 11 5/8 in). The railway was most successful between World War I and World War II and supported the economic development of the region. The railway was operated by the governmental Lithuanian railway Lietuvos Geležinkeliai after World War II.

Traffic declined in the second half of the 20th century. The operations ceased in 1996 north of Panevezys. The narrow gauge railway was added to the list of immovable cultural objects of the Republic of Lithuania in 1996 and was given the status of cultural heritage object. Subsequently, tourist train services began. The goods traffic was phased-out in 1999. A new department for Narrow Gauge Railways was created on 1 November 1999 within the governmental railways office Lietuvos Geležinkeliai. Even so, the passenger traffic ceased temporarily in 2001. With effect from 2006 tourist trains were run with ТУ2 diesel locomotives and these were well received with increasing passenger numbers.

== Cultural heritage ==
The railway stations along the narrow gauge railway track are important historic and cultural structures and are important regarding the urban and architectural development of the region. Thus the railway was added to the list of immovable cultural objects of the Republic of Lithuania and was given the status of cultural heritage object.

The governmentally protected structures include the railway lines from Panevėžys to Biržai, from Panevėžys to Rubikiai and from Joniškėlis to Linkuva with a total length of 179 kilometres (111 mi) and an area of 1340 hectares, railway stations, production buildings and affiliated roads based on a proposal by Jonas Glemža, the Chairman of the Commission of Cultural Heritage of the Republic of Lithuania.

Furthermore, the government decided in 2003 to protect some of the railway's structures as cultural monuments according to Article 10.2 of the Law for the Protection of Immovable Cultural Objects:

- The narrow gauge railway line from Panevėžys to Rubikiai
- The depot, the stores and the viaduct in Panevėžys
- The railway stations in Taruškos and Raguvėlė, the stores, water tower, workshop, the station building and the water crane in Raguvėlė railway station
- Surdegis railway station
- Troškūnai railway station the station building and a house nearby
- Anykščiai railway station, the station building, the stores, the water tower, the water crane
- Anykščiai railway bridge

== Photos along the track ==
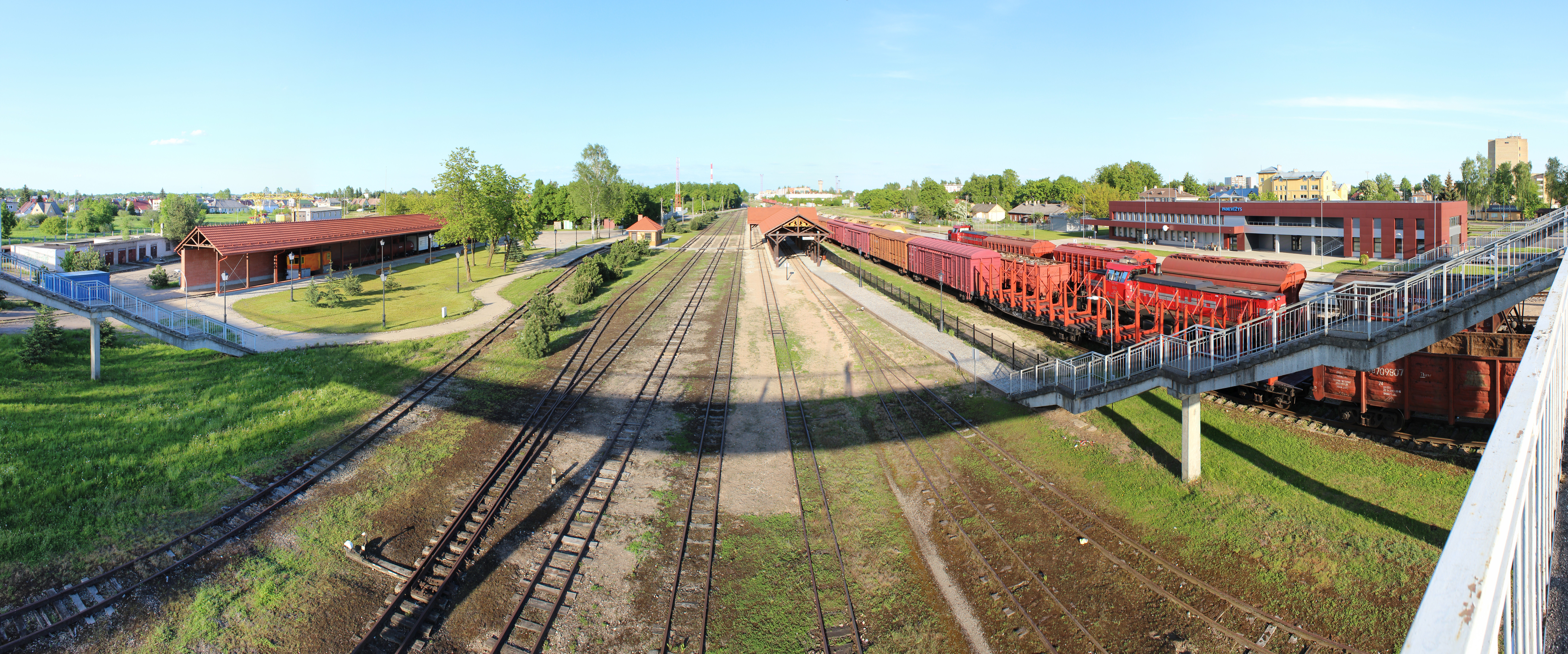
Panevėžys station

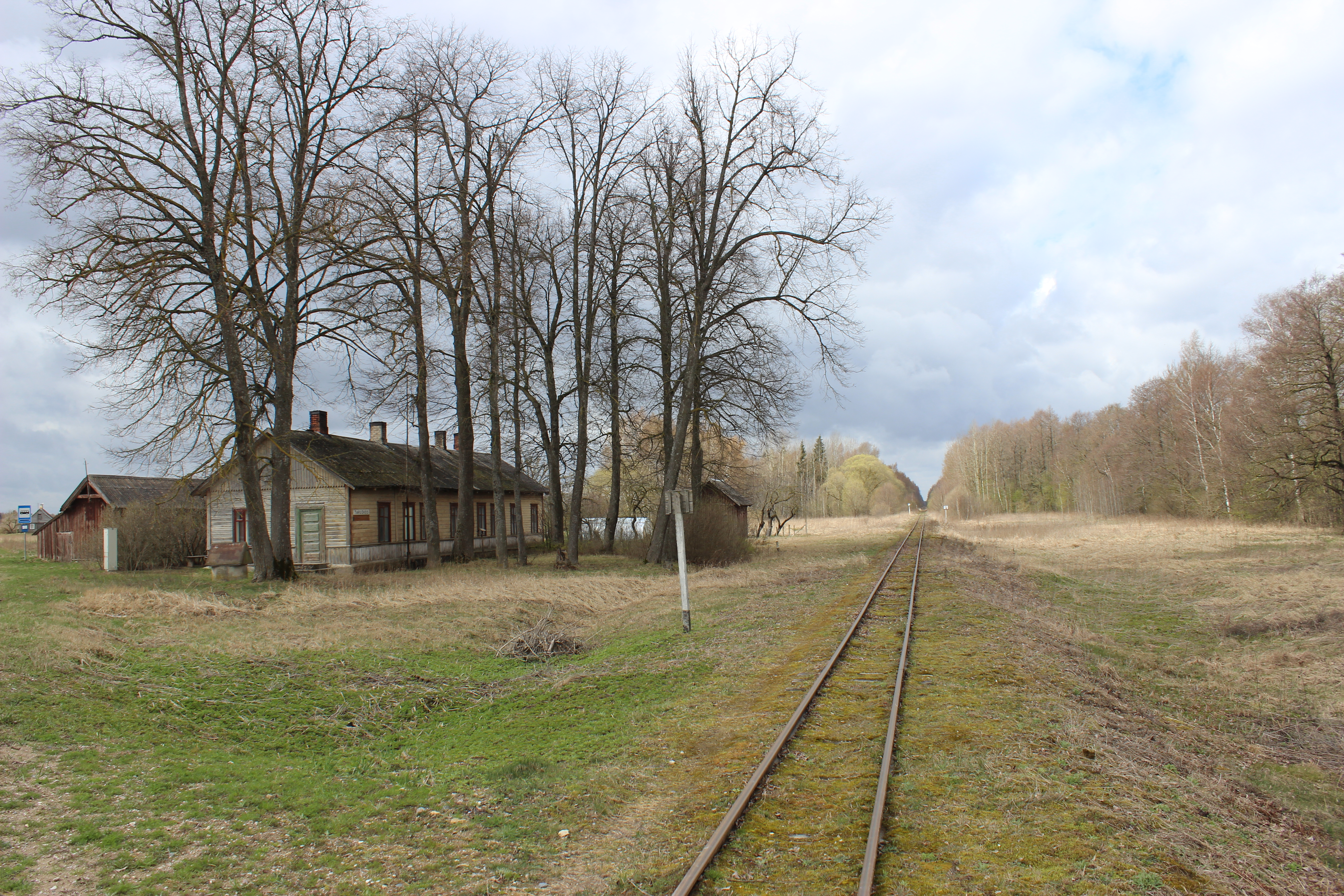
Taruškos

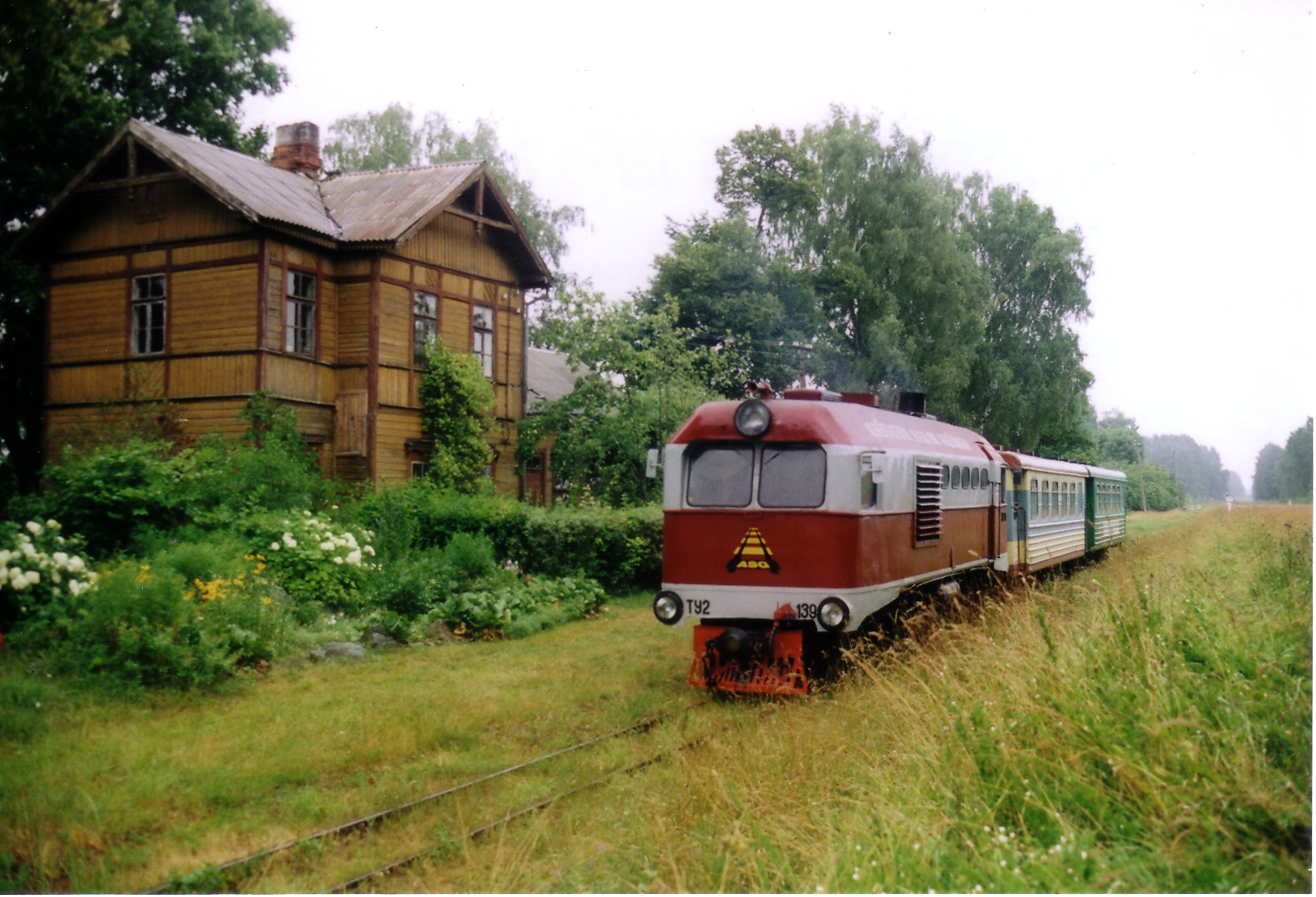
ТУ2 near Surdegis

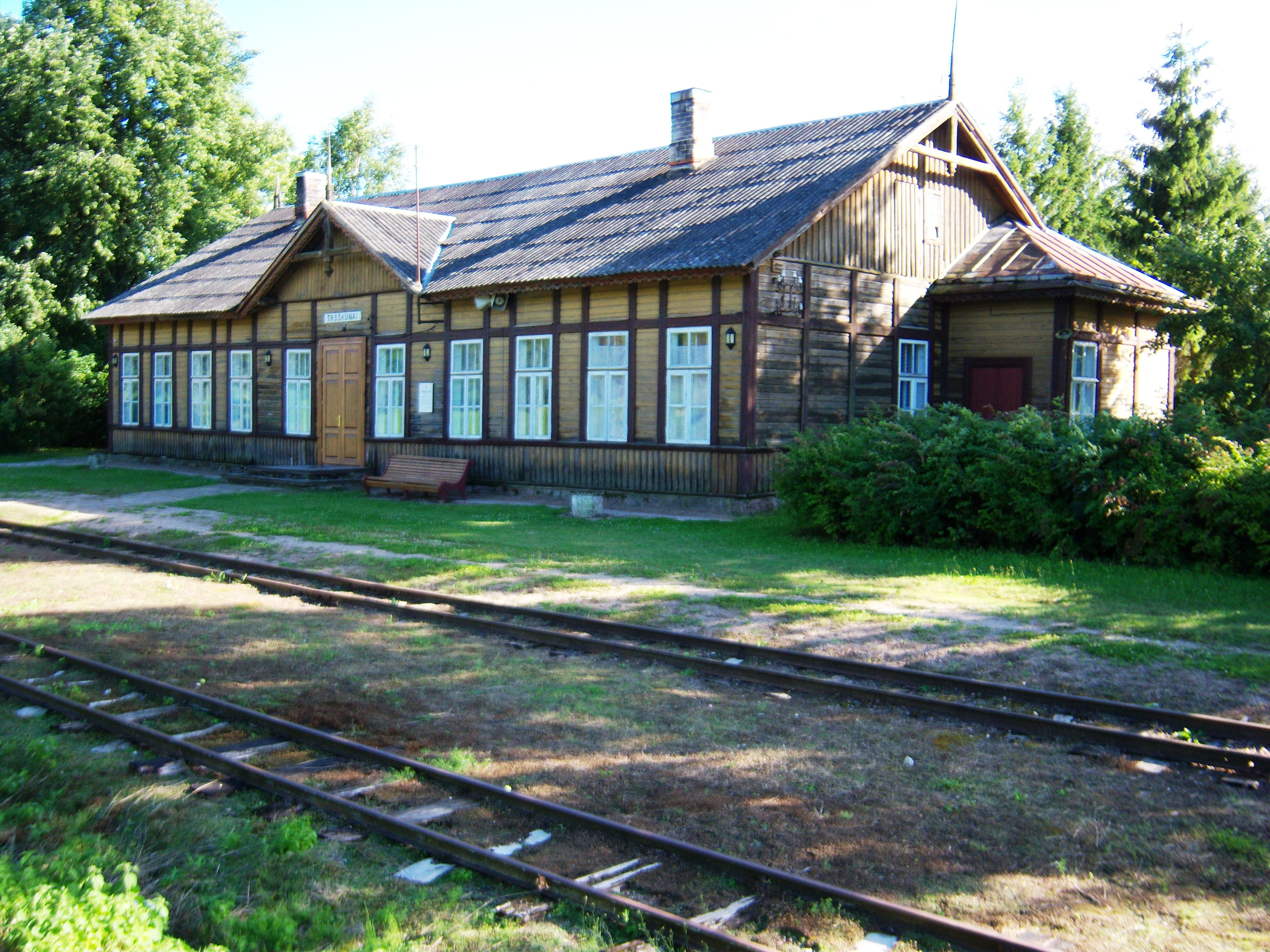
Troškūnai

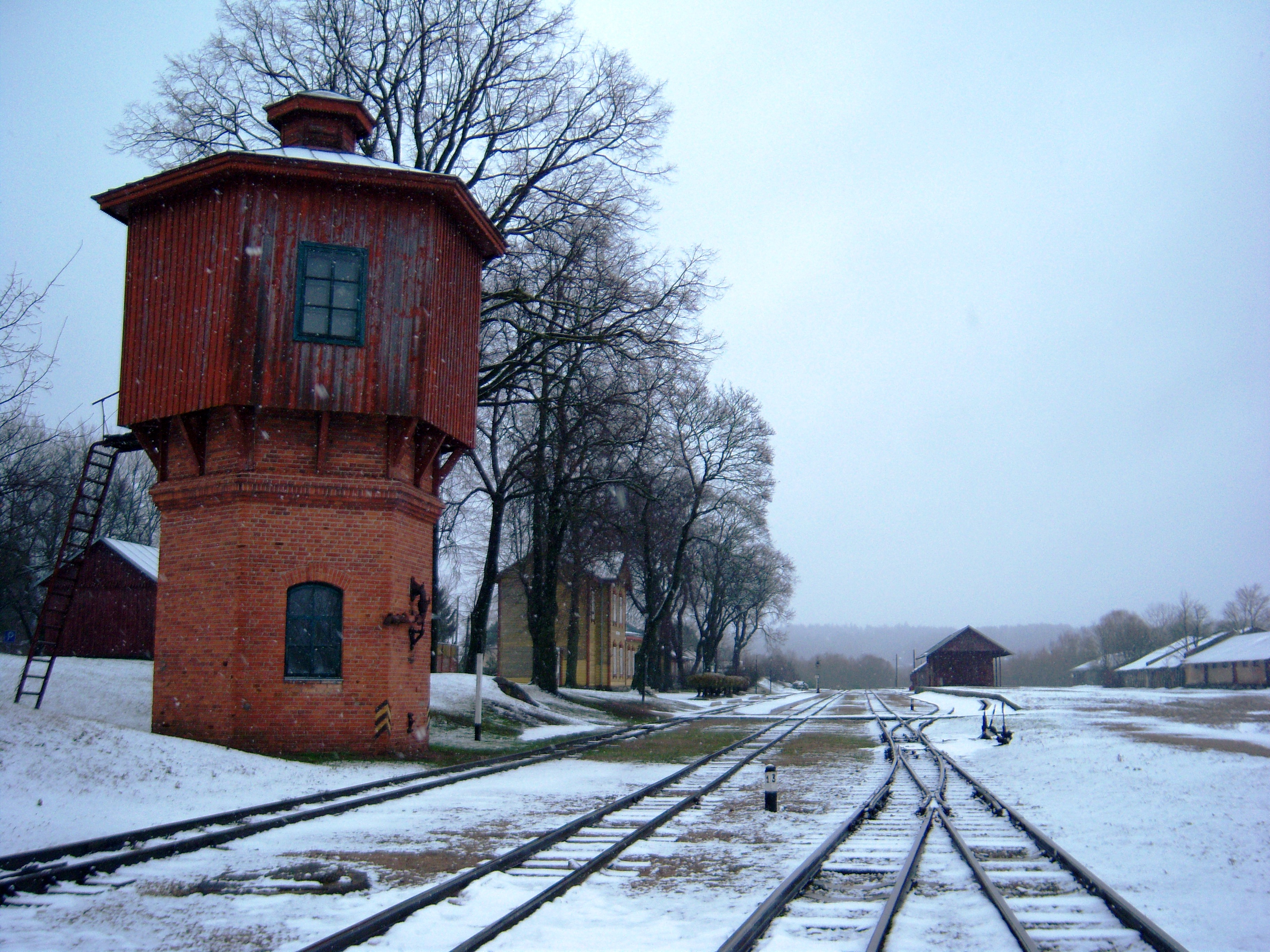
Anykščiai station

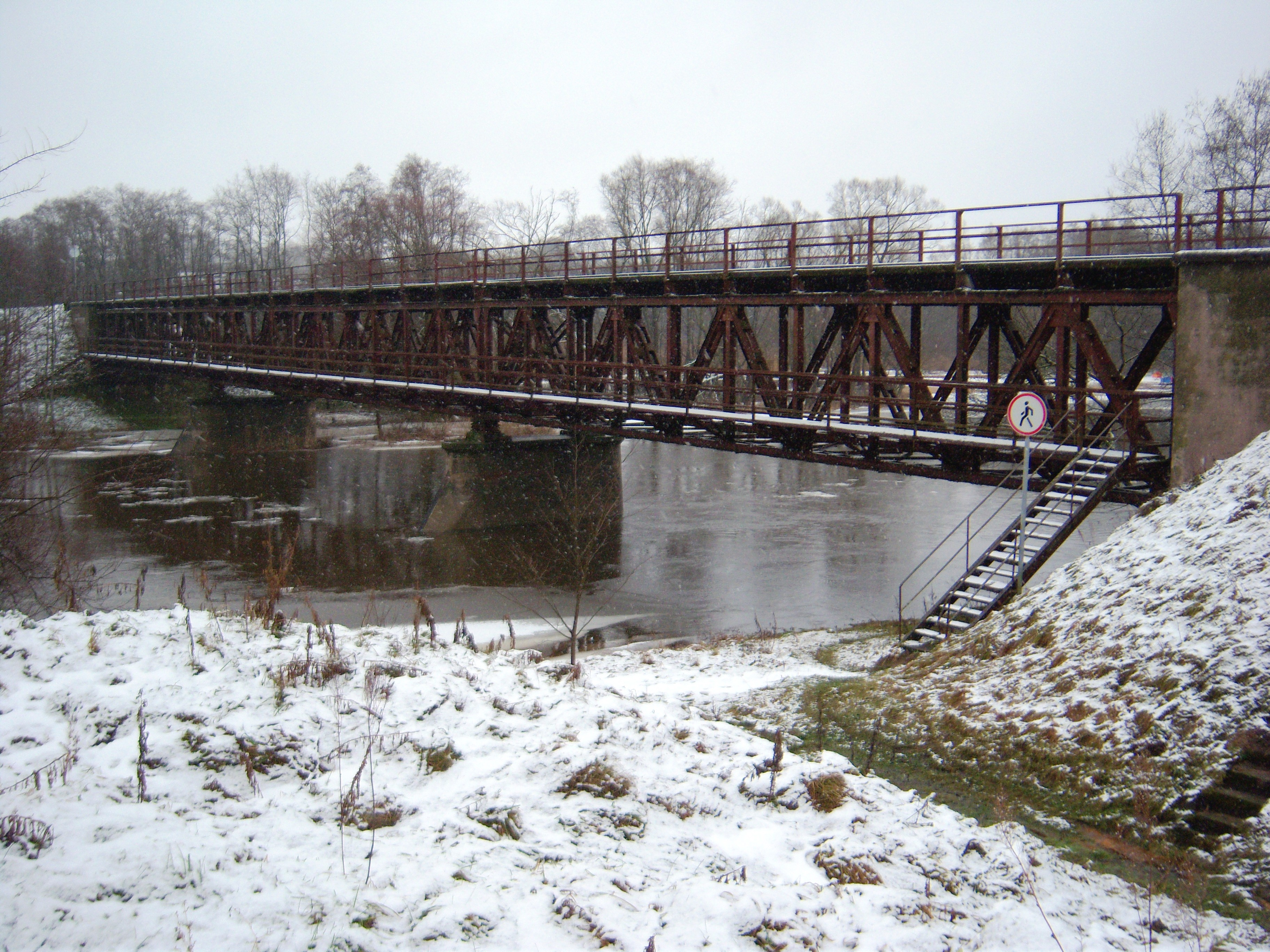
Bridge near Anykščiai

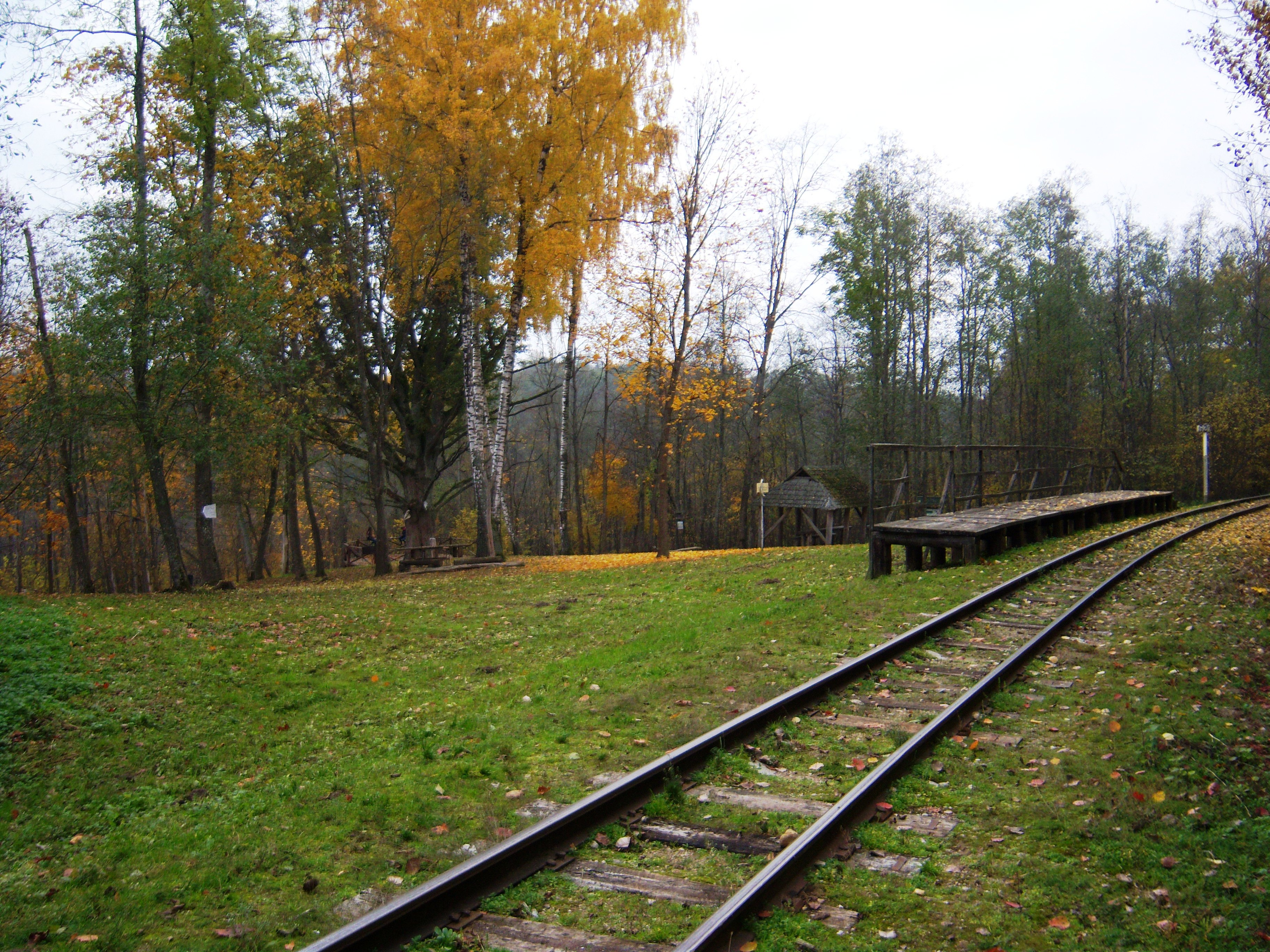
Žažumbris

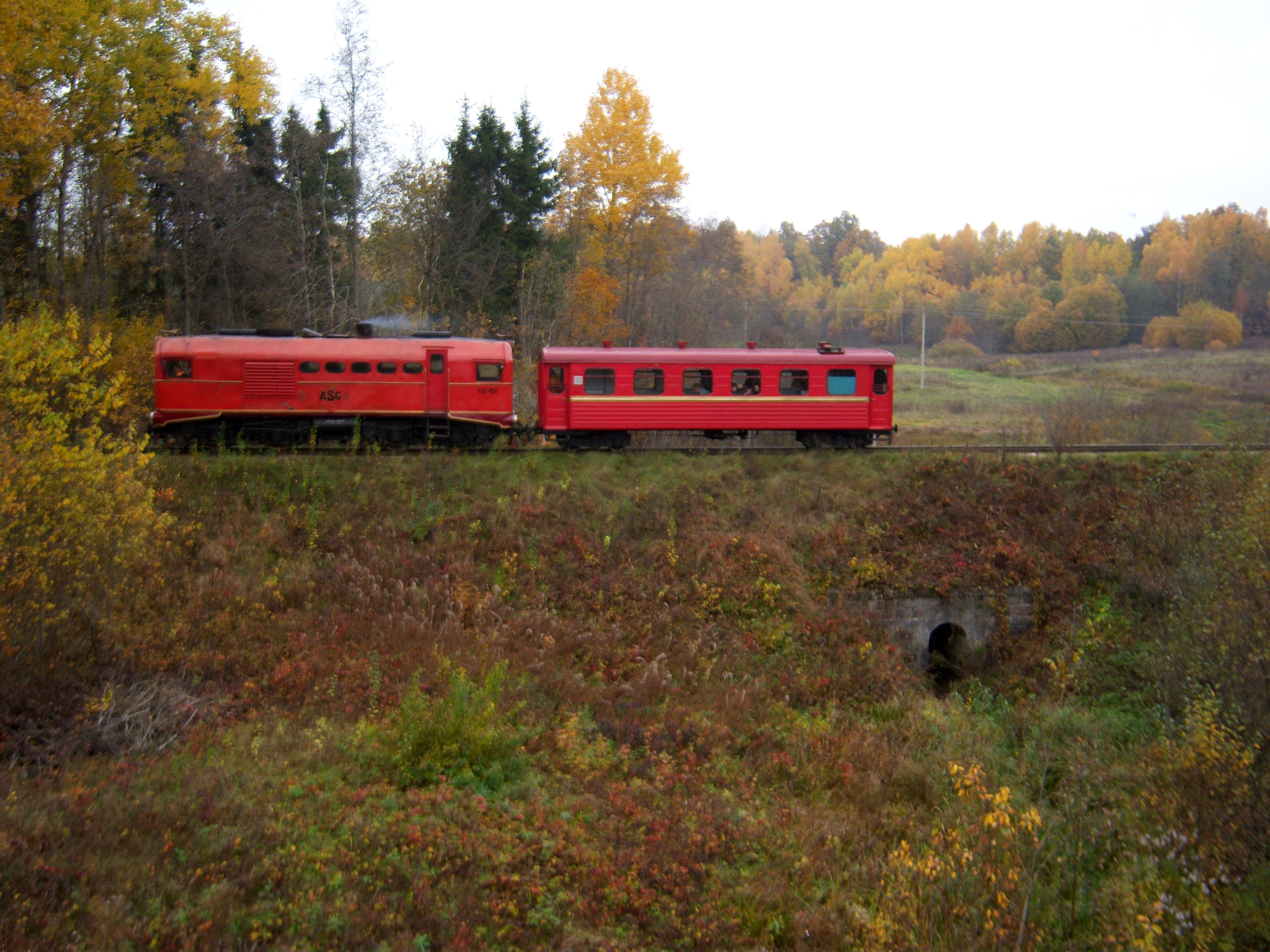
Bičionys

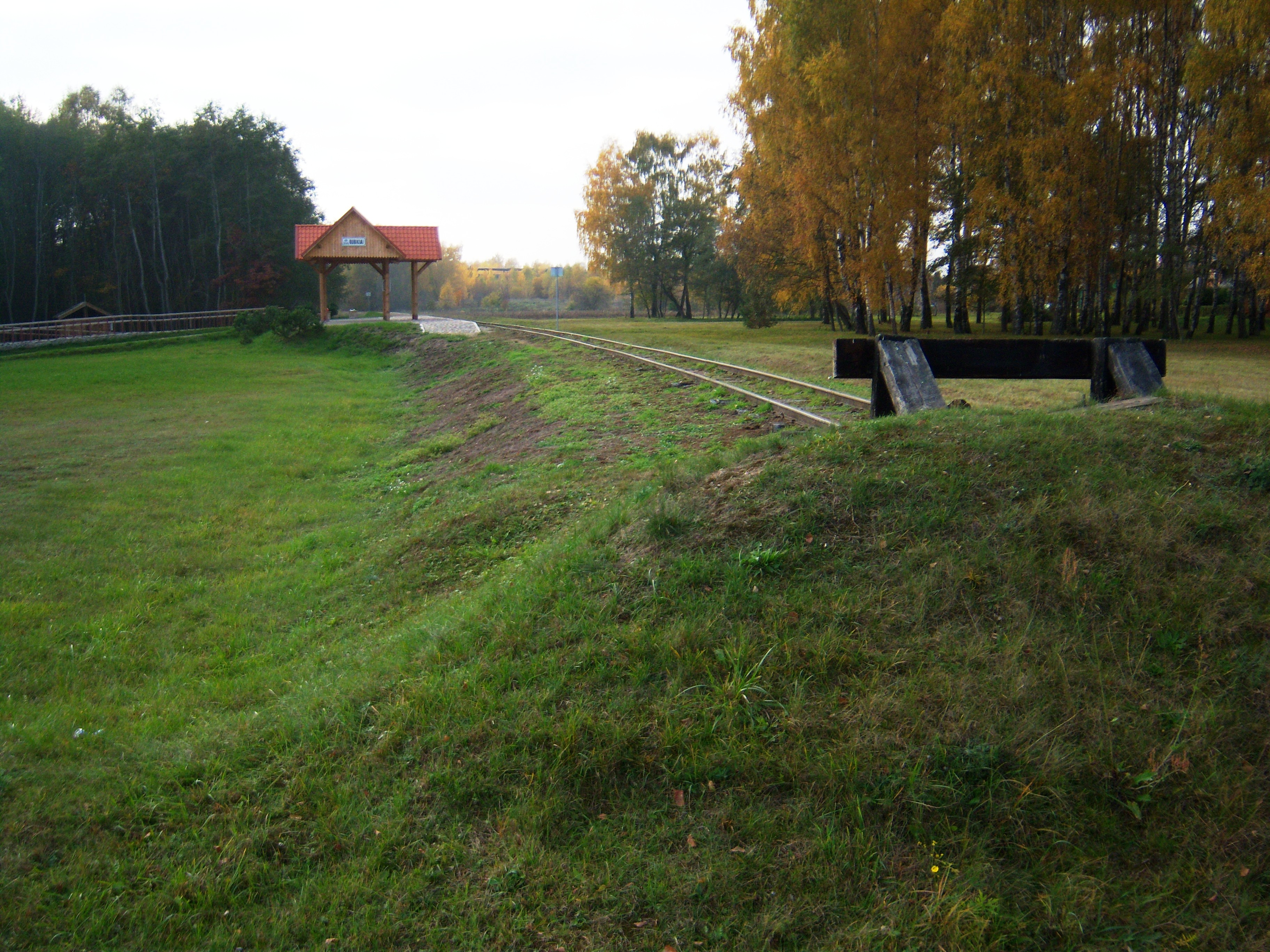
Rubikiai terminus
