= Rubikiai =

Coordinates: 55°31′N 25°15′E

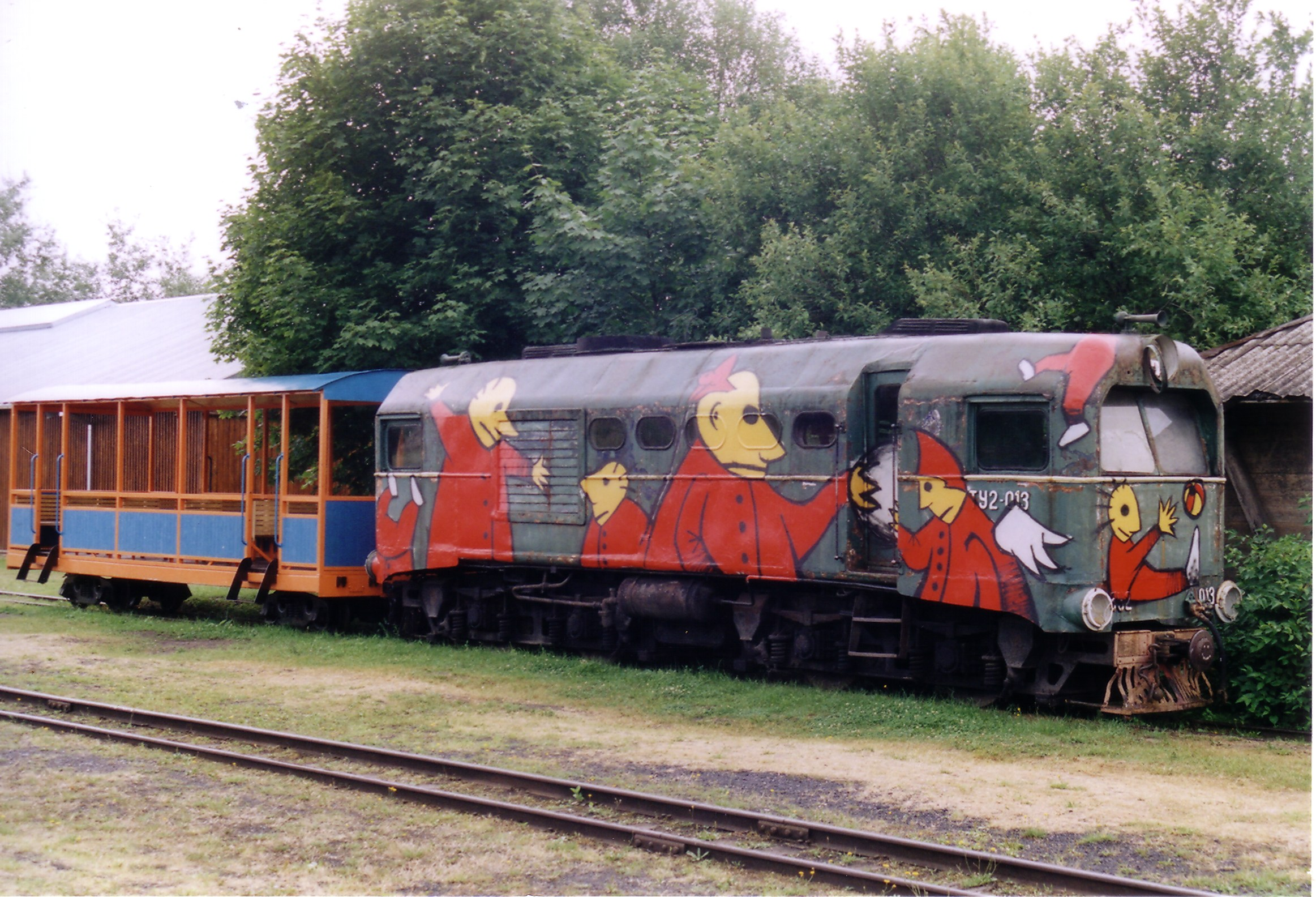
Narrow gauge train redesigned for tourists

Rubikiai is a village located close to the Lake Rubikiai, Anykščiai district municipality, Lithuania. It is known for a narrow gauge railroad line that is now protected by the state.

Current services
| Preceding station | LTG Link | Following station |
|---|---|---|
| Bičionys towards Anykščiai | Aukštaitija narrow gauge railway | Terminus |
