= Nasvė =

Location
- Country: Lithuania
- Region: Anykščiai district municipality, Utena County

Physical characteristics
- Mouth: Šventoji
  - coordinates: 55.6160°N 25.4448°E

Basin features
- Progression: Šventoji→ Neris→ Neman→ Baltic Sea

The Nasvė is a river of Anykščiai district municipality, Utena County, in northeastern Lithuania. It flows for 24.6 kilometres (15.3 mi) and has a basin area of 64.1 km^{2} (24.7 sq mi).

The Nasvė is a right tributary of the Šventoji.
