= Antanas Vienuolis =

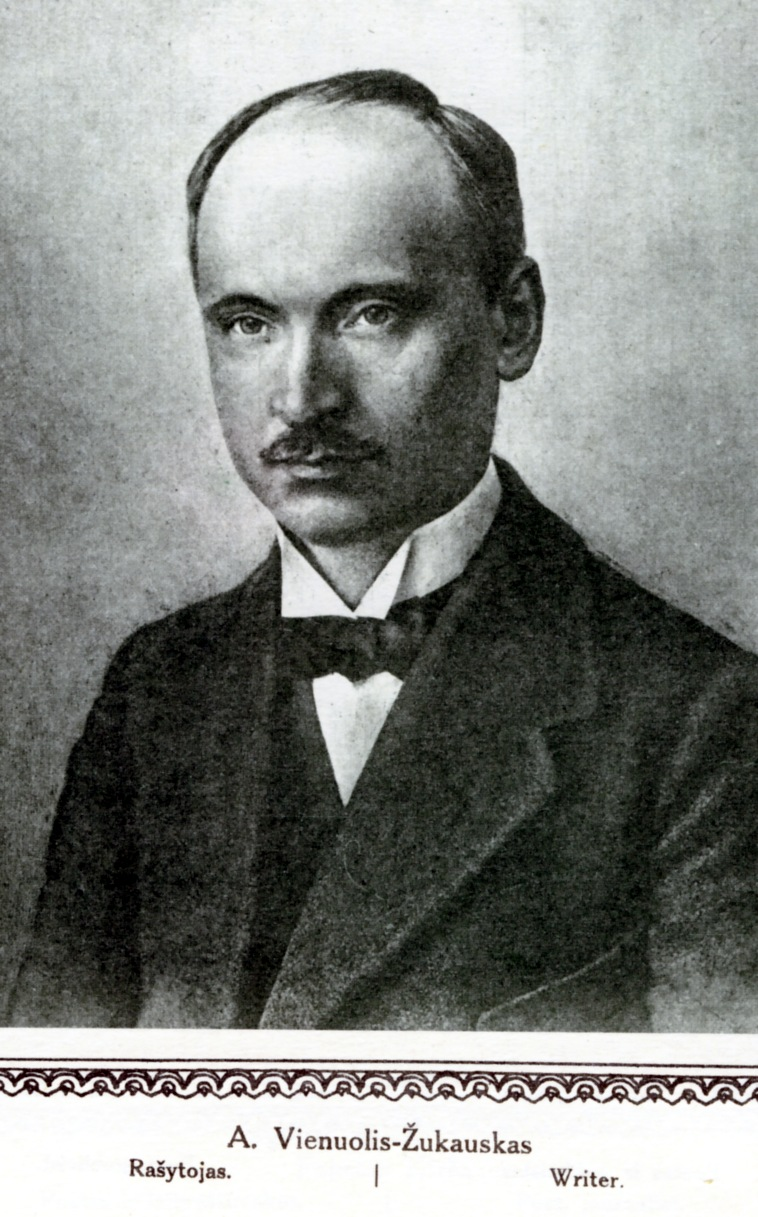
Vienuolis Žukauskas

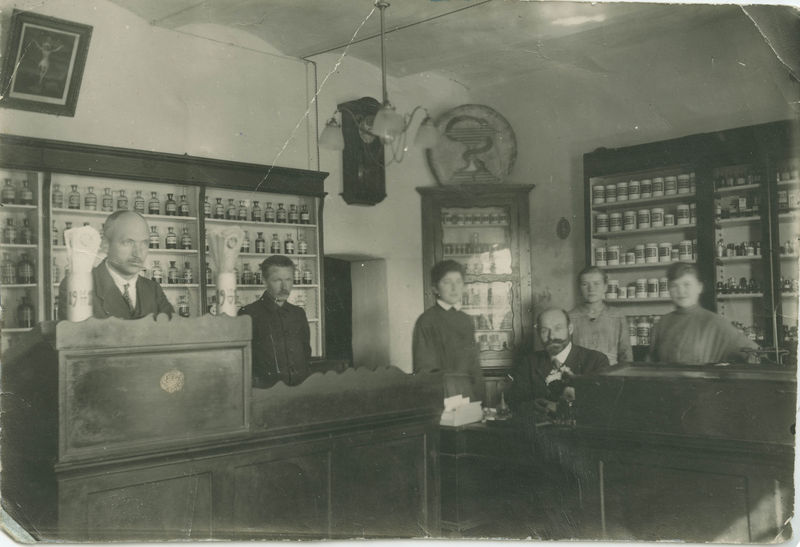
Antanas Vienuolis (first on left) in a pharmacy that he owned in Anykščiai

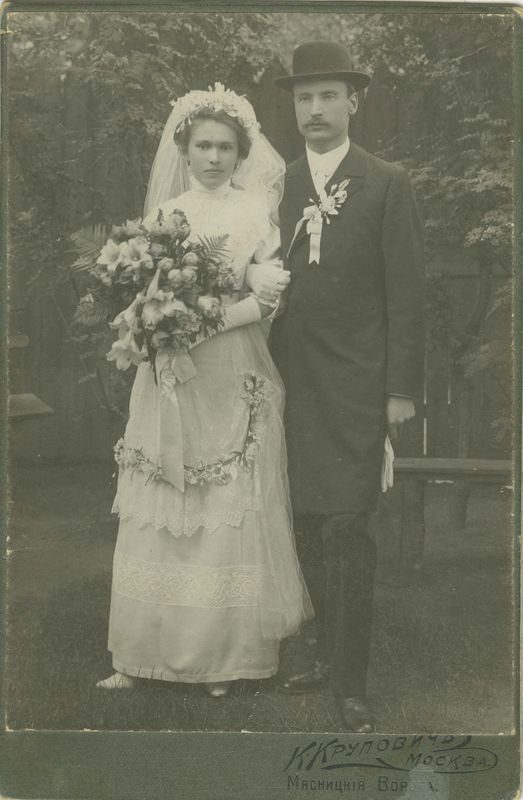
Antanas Vienuolis with his wife Zofija Jackūnaitė on the wedding day (22 June 1913)

Antanas Vienuolis (born Antanas Žukauskas; 7 April 1882 — 17 August 1957) was a Lithuanian writer, dramatist and one of the most famous realistic prosaists.

== Biography ==
Vienuolis was born on April 7, 1882, in Ažuožeriai, Anykščiai District Municipality, Russian Empire. His parents, Julijonas Žukauskas and Rozalija Baranauskaitė, were peasants. Antanas was the youngest child and the only one son in the family, he had 5 older sisters. Antanas' family was in quite good circumstances and had 25 ha of land.

In 1894, he moved to Užupiečiai, where he attended Anykščiai school, where all subjects were taught in Russian. Žukauskas was an exemplary student at school. In 1895 he moved to Liepāja, where he attended the Liepāja Gymnasium and met famous Lithuanian writer Jonas Biliūnas.

Vienuolis died on August 17, 1957, from acute thrombosis of the coronary arteries. He was buried in the yard near his house.

== Works ==
Vienuolis has written many legends, novels, novellas, memorials and dramas.

List of works of Antanas Vienuolis:

- Amžinasis smuikininkas (Eternal violinist)
- Užkeiktieji vienuoliai (Cursed monks)
- Platelių ežero paslaptis (Secret of Lake Plateliai)
- Gražuolės Lalos kalnas(Mountain of Beauty Lala)
- Kruvinojo keršto uola (Rock of the bloody revenge)
- Samgori dykuma (Samagori desert)
- Krymo įspūdžiai (Crimean impressions)
- Mieganti Ararato mergelė (Sleeping miss from Ararath)
- Anykščių padavimai (Anykščiai stories)
- Medvėgalio pilis (Medvėgalis Castle)
- Naglio kalno lobiai (Treasure of Mount Naglis)
- Šventavartė (Holygate)
- Grįžo (Came back)
- Aleliuja (Hallelujah)
- „Kūčių naktį (At night of Christmas Eve)
- Paskutinė vietelė (The last place)
- „Užžėlusiu taku
- Paskenduolė (The drowned)
- Didysis karas (The big war)
- Pati
- Samdinė Elena
- Mano krikštatėvio kumeliukas (My Godfather's colt)
- Pavainikė (Illegitimate)
- Arkliavagio duktė (Rustler's daughter)
- Gediminaitė ir mužikas (Gediminaitė and kern)
- Susitikimai Kaukaze (Meetings in Caucasus)
- Iš mano atsiminimų (From my memorials)
- Inteligentų palata (Intelligents' ward)
- Vėžys
- Mirtinai sužeistas (Mortally wounded)
- Karžygys (Warrior)
- Prieš dieną (Day before )
- Kryžkelės (Crossroads)
- 1831 metai (The year 1831)
- Nemigo naktys (Sleepless nights)
- Viešnia iš šiaurės (Guest from the north)
- Ministeris (Minister)
- Dauboje (In the dip)
- Išdukterė
- Puodžiūnkiemis
