= Virinta =

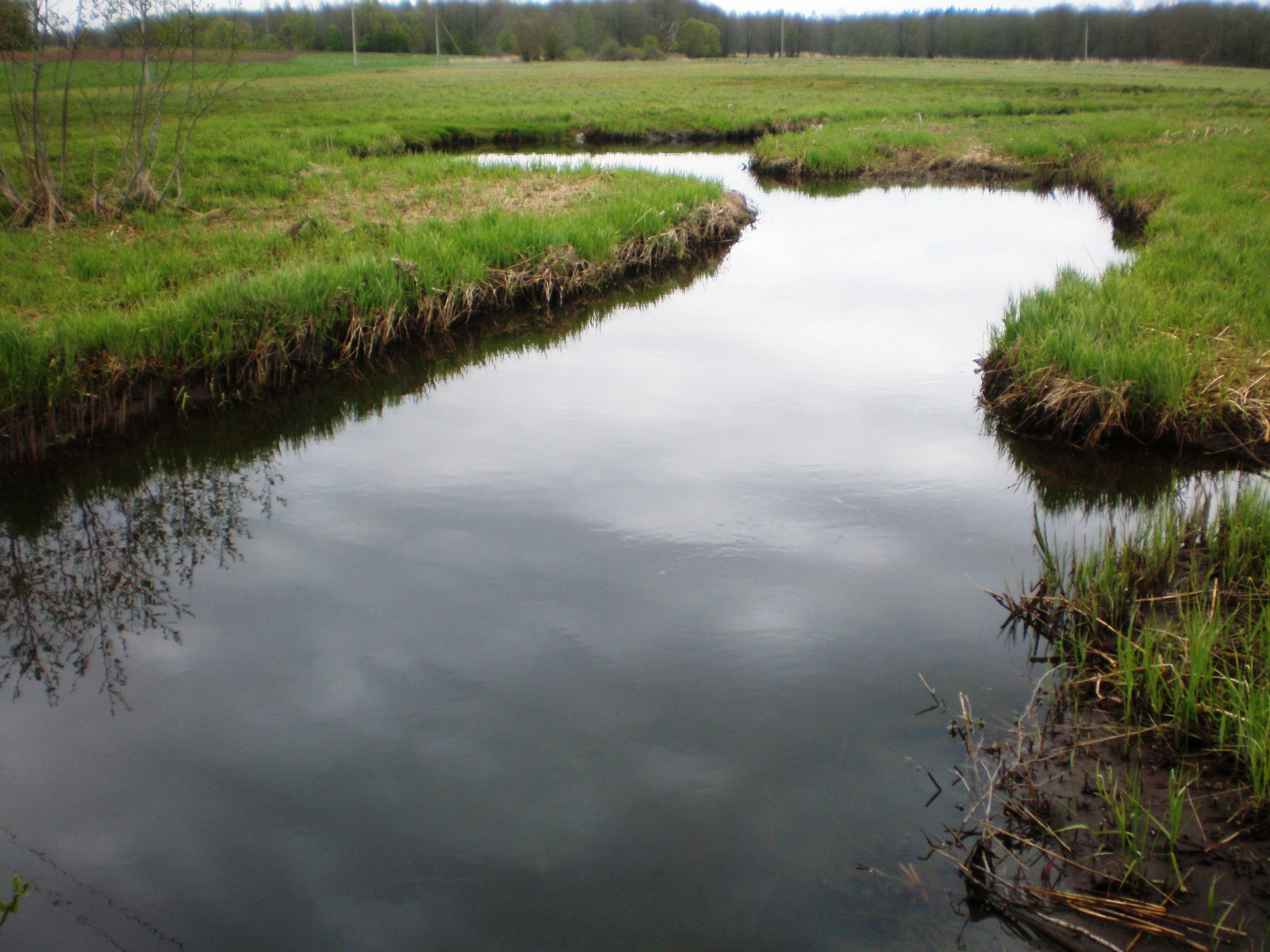

Location
- Country: Lithuania
- Region: Anykščiai district municipality, Utena County

Physical characteristics
- Mouth
  - coordinates: 55.4577°N 25.0050°E
- Length: 59.1 km (36.7 mi)
- Basin size: 566.3 km^{2} (218.6 sq mi)

Basin features
- Progression: Šventoji→ Neris→ Neman→ Baltic Sea

The Virinta is a river of Anykščiai district municipality, Utena County, in northeastern Lithuania. It flows for 59.1 kilometres (36.7 mi) and has a basin area of 566.3 km^{2} (218.6 sq mi).

It is a left tributary of the Šventoji.
