= Luodis =

Lake in Lithuania

Luodis Lake
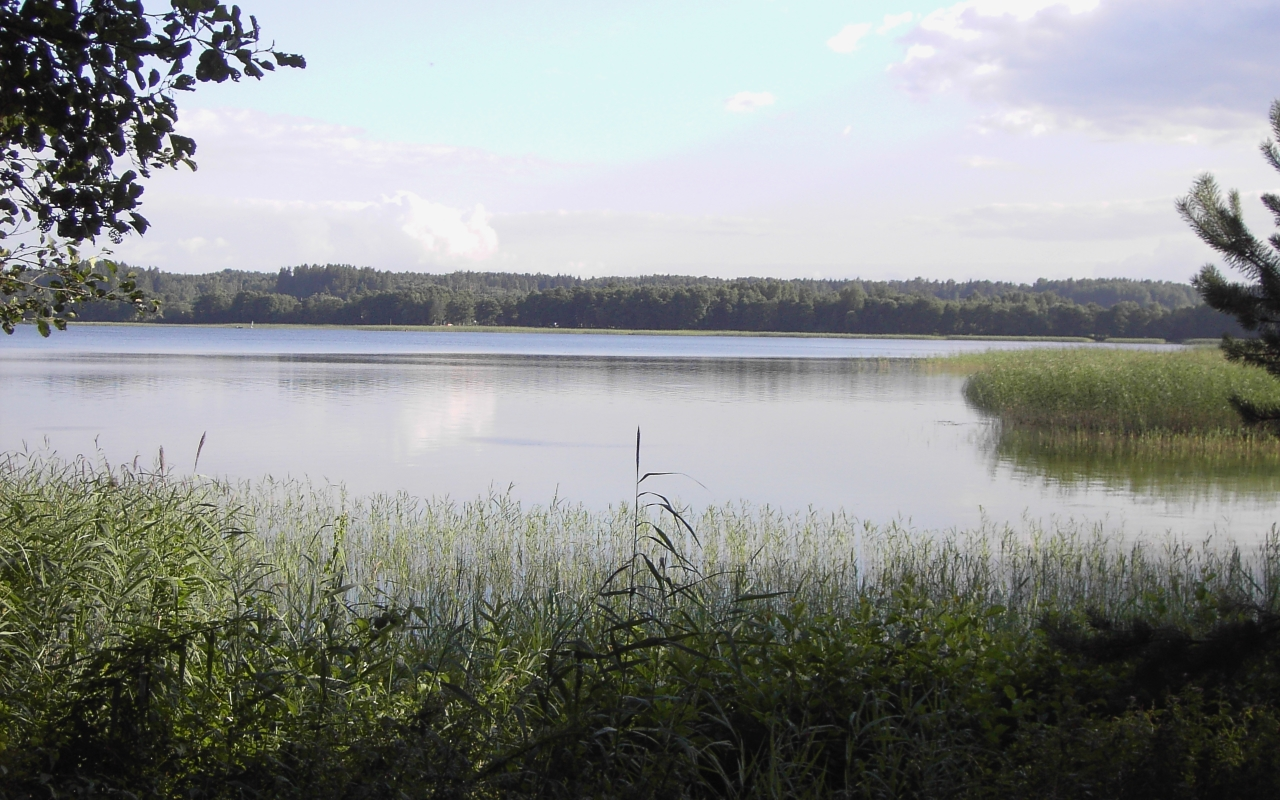

- Location within Lithuania
- Location: Zarasai, Lithuania
- Coordinates: 55°34′42″N 26°12′8″E
- Lake type: glacial
- Primary inflows: Šventoji
- Primary outflows: Šventoji
- Basin countries: Lithuania
- Surface area: 13.2 km^{2} (5.1 sq mi)
- Average depth: 6.7 m (22 ft)
- Max. depth: 18.4 m (60 ft)
- Shore length^{1}: 28.2 km (17.5 mi)
- Islands: 2
- Settlements: Salakas
- ^{1} Shore length is not a well-defined measure.

Luodis Lake is a lake situated in the Zarasai district municipality of Lithuania. It is the 6th largest lake in Lithuania. The town of Salakas is also situated near the lake.

== Geography ==
The length of the lake, measuring from North-East to South-West is 6.3 km, and its width can be up to 4.4 km. The deepest point reaches 18.4 m. The lake contains 2 larger islands - Alaunė and Sadausko, and 2 smaller ones - Pilelė and Kanapinė. The total area of the 4 islands is 17.8 ha.
