= Pelyša =

River in Lithuania

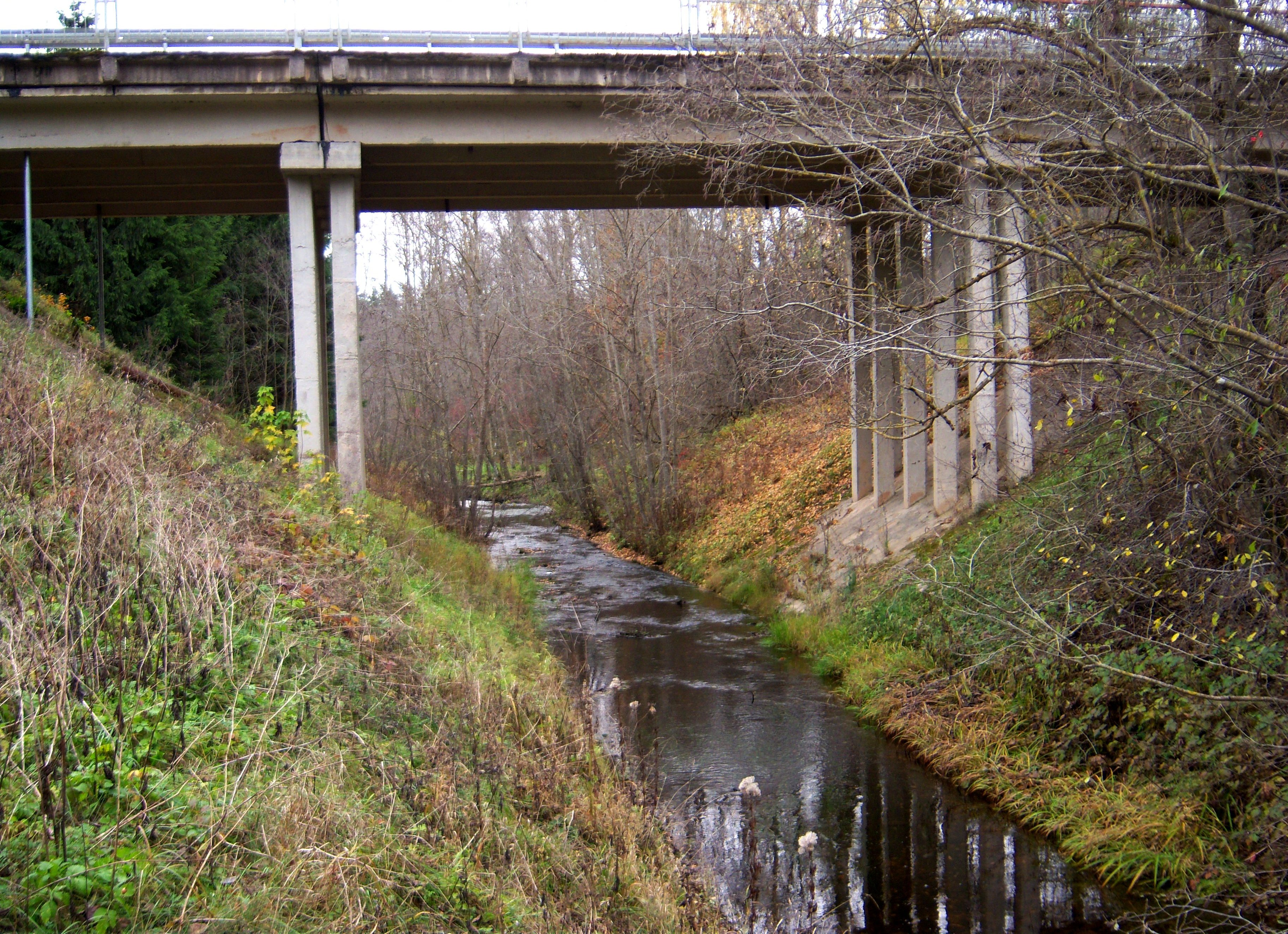

Location
- Country: Lithuania
- Location: Anykščiai district municipality, Utena County

Physical characteristics
- Mouth: Šventoji
  - coordinates: 55.6475°N 25.1053°E

Basin features
- Progression: Šventoji→ Neris→ Neman→ Baltic Sea

The Pelyša is a river of Anykščiai district municipality, Utena County, in northeastern Lithuania. It flows for 19.3 kilometres and has a basin area of 109.2 km^{2}.

The Pelyša is a right tributary of the Šventoji.
