= Anykščiai Regional Park =

- IUCN category V (protected landscape/seascape)
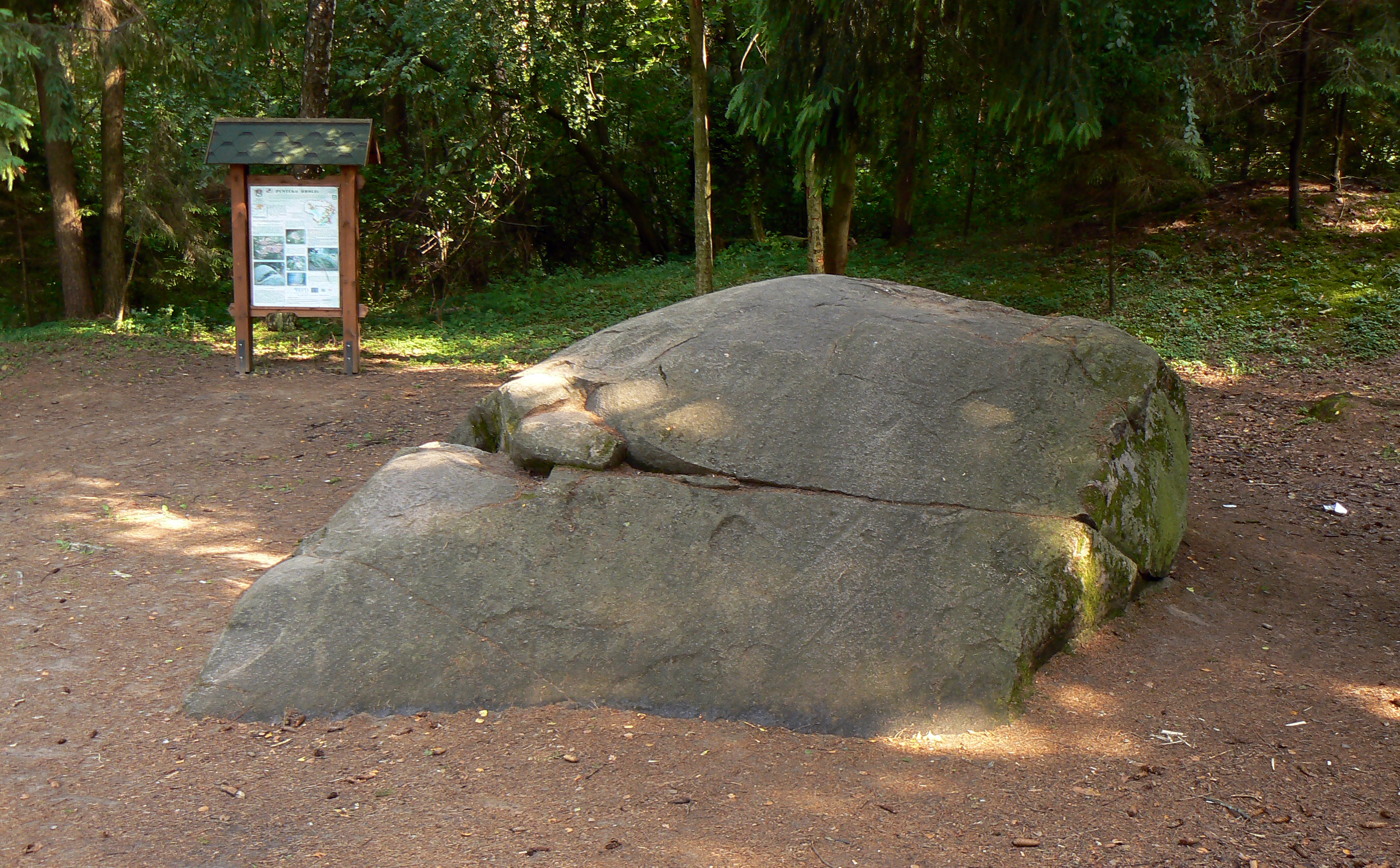
- Stone "Puntuko brolis" in Anykščiai Regional Park

- Location within Lithuania
- Location: Utena County, Lithuania
- Nearest city: Anykščiai
- Coordinates: 55°30′36″N 25°08′20″E
- Area: 15,485 ha (38,260 acres)
- Established: 1992
- Website: www.anyksciuparkas.lt

Anykščiai Regional Park covers 15,485 hectares (38,260 acres) in northeastern Lithuania near the city of Anykščiai. It was founded in 1992 to preserve natural and cultural areas.

A horse museum, the Burbiškis estate, archeological sites that have been connected to King of Lithuania Mindaugas, and a narrow-gauge railway are located within the park. Its cultural landmarks include the home of the author Antanas Baranauskas.

== See also ==
- Horse Museum (Lithuania)
