= Anykščiai =

Town in Aukštaitija Region, Lithuania

- City
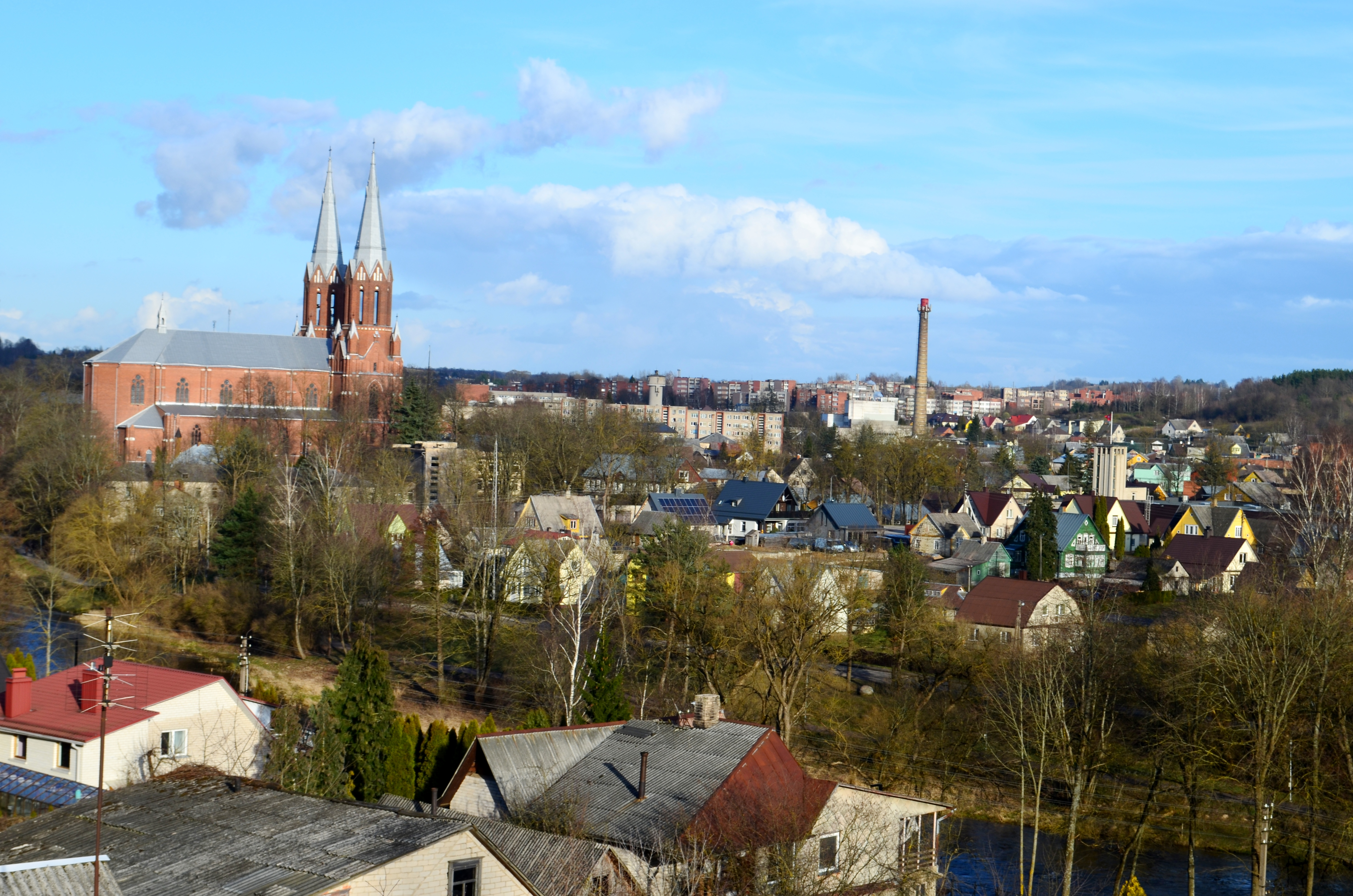
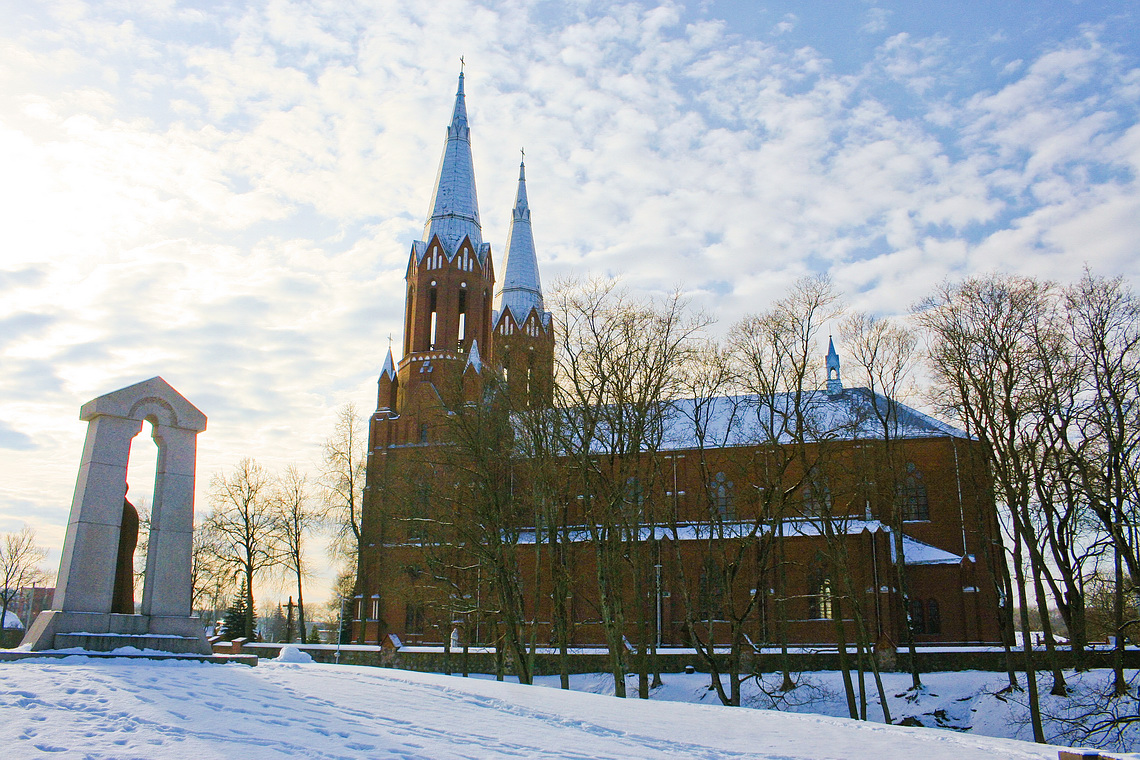
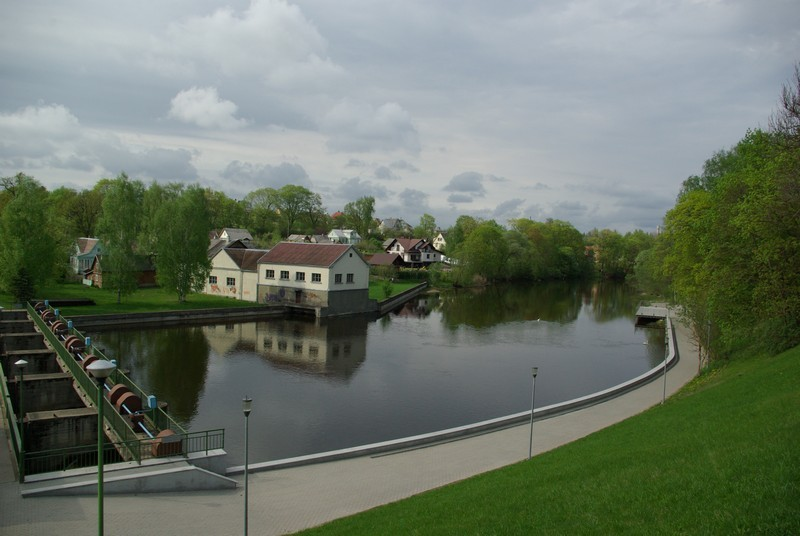
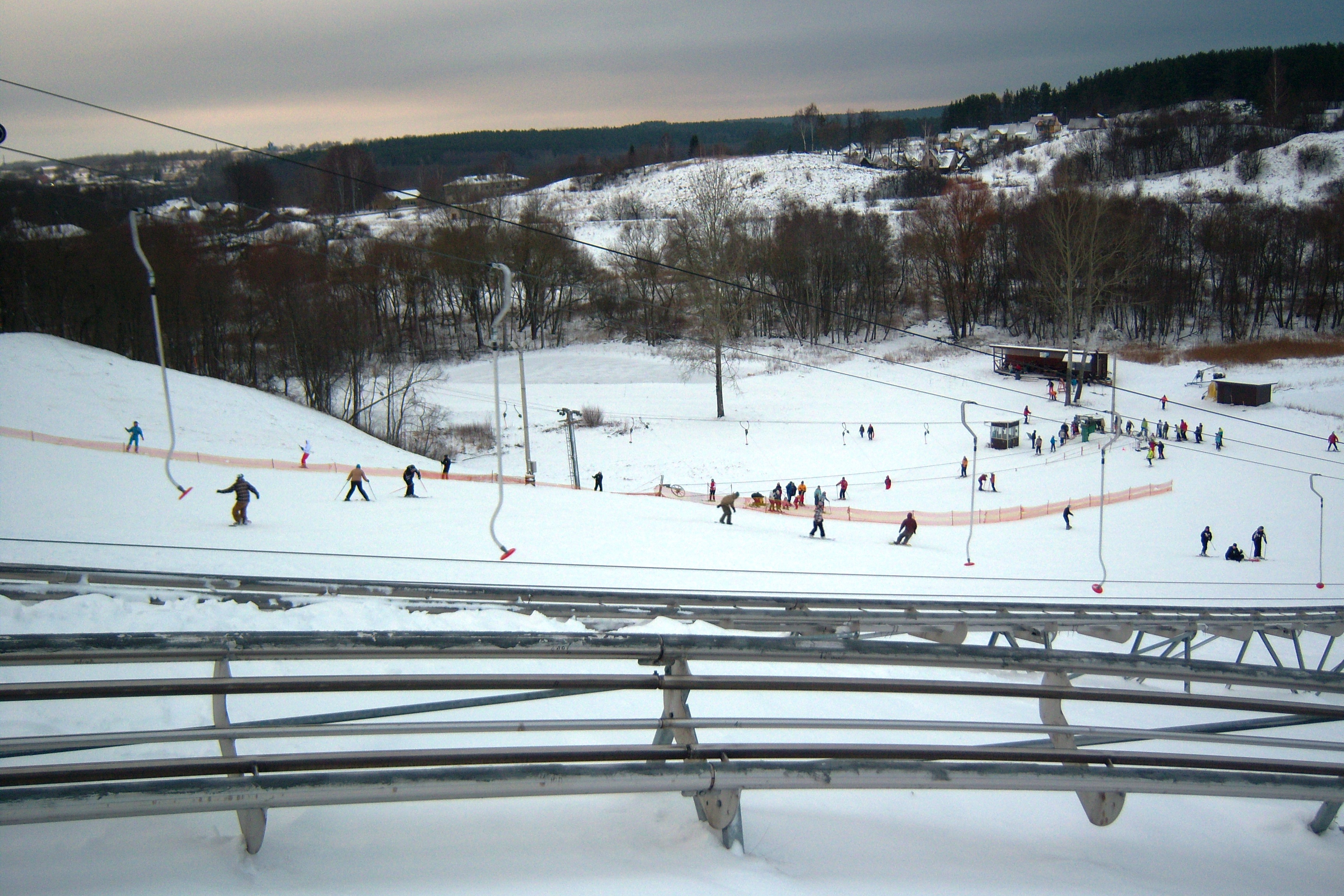
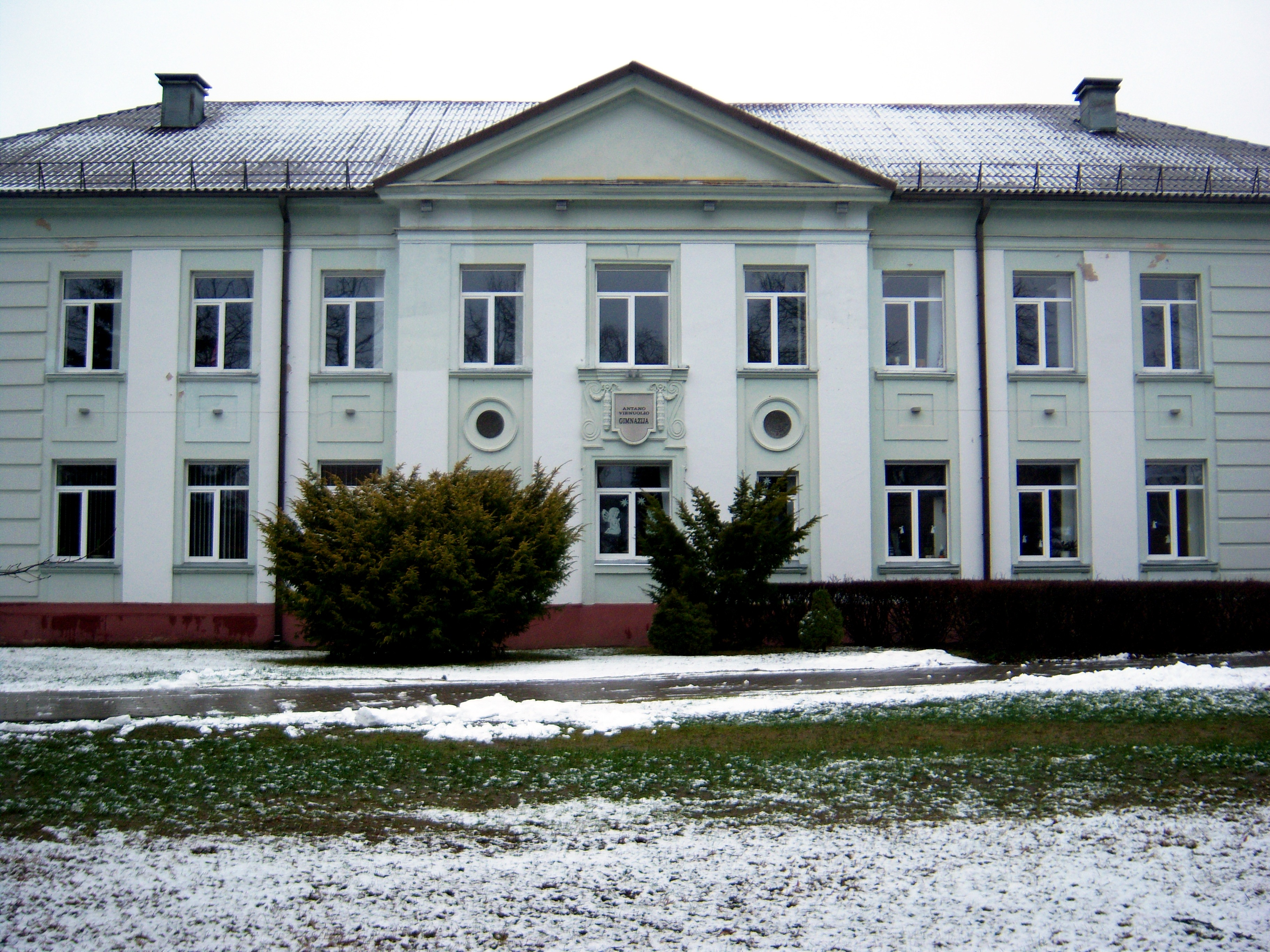
- Skyline of the city Church of St. Matthew (the tallest church in Lithuania) and Antanas Baranauskas Monument Šventoji River flowing through Anykščiai Alpine skiing on Kalita mount Antanas Vienuolis Gymnasium The Treetop Walking Path

- Flag Coat of arms Brandmark
- Nickname: Weimar of Lithuania
- Location of Anykščiai
- Coordinates: 55°32′N 25°6′E
- Country: Lithuania
- Ethnographic region: Aukštaitija
- County: Utena County
- Municipality: Anykščiai district municipality
- Eldership: Anykščiai eldership
- Capital of: Anykščiai district municipality Anykščiai eldership
- First mentioned: 1442
- Granted city rights: 1516

Population (2021)
  - Total: 8,495
- Time zone: UTC+2 (EET)
  - Summer (DST): UTC+3 (EEST)

Anykščiai (see other names) is a ski resort city in Lithuania, 20 miles (32 kilometres) west of Utena. The Roman Catholic Church of St. Matthias in Anykščiai is the tallest church in Lithuania, with spires measuring 79 metres (259 feet) in height. Anykščiai has a resort status in Lithuania and is a popular destination of domestic tourism.

== Name ==
The name of the city is believed to be derived from the Lithuanian hydronym Anykšta. Its name in other languages includes Polish: Onikszty; Russian: Они́кшты, romanized: Onikshty; Belarusian: Ані́кшты, romanized: Anikshty; Yiddish: אַניקשט, romanized: Aniksht; German: Onikschten.

== History ==
Anykščiai was the location of one of many Roman Catholic churches where the priests had to know the Lithuanian language according to the Grand Duke of Lithuania Alexander Jagiellon in 1501

Archeological research in the area has revealed settlements dating from the late Neolithic.

Anykščiai was first mentioned on 7 November 1442 as a possession of Grand Duke of Lithuania Casimir IV Jagiellon.

Its location on the Šventoji River, connecting it to the Baltic Sea via the Neris River and Nemunas River, contributed to its development. It also lay on a land route between the cities of Vilnius and Riga. Its strategic importance led to frequent assaults by the Teutonic Order. The first written mention of the town dates to 1442; its first appearance on a map is dated tentatively to about 1578.

Anykščiai is a place where many Lithuanian poets and writers originated - Antanas Vienuolis, Antanas Baranauskas, Jonas Biliūnas. It is called Weimar of Lithuania for that reason. There are about 250 culturally and historically important places in Anykščiai and Anykščiai district - Anykščių šilelis, to which the poem The Forest of Anykščiai of A.Baranauskas was dedicated, Puntukas boulder, the Beacon of Happiness monument, canopy walkway, horse museum, manors and old Lithuanian fort hills shrouded in mystery and legends.

Prior to Lithuania re-establishing its independence after World War I, Anykščiai was part of the Kovno Governorate of the Russian Empire. A shtetl existed within the town, with a Jewish population of 2,754 in 1900.

Wool processing facilities, a winery, and Lithuanian and Jewish schools were established after World War I, when its population reached about 4,000. During World War II, its bridges and city center were destroyed. In summer 1941, two mass executions of the local Jewish population occurred. Around 1,500 Jews were murdered by German Nazis and their local collaborators.

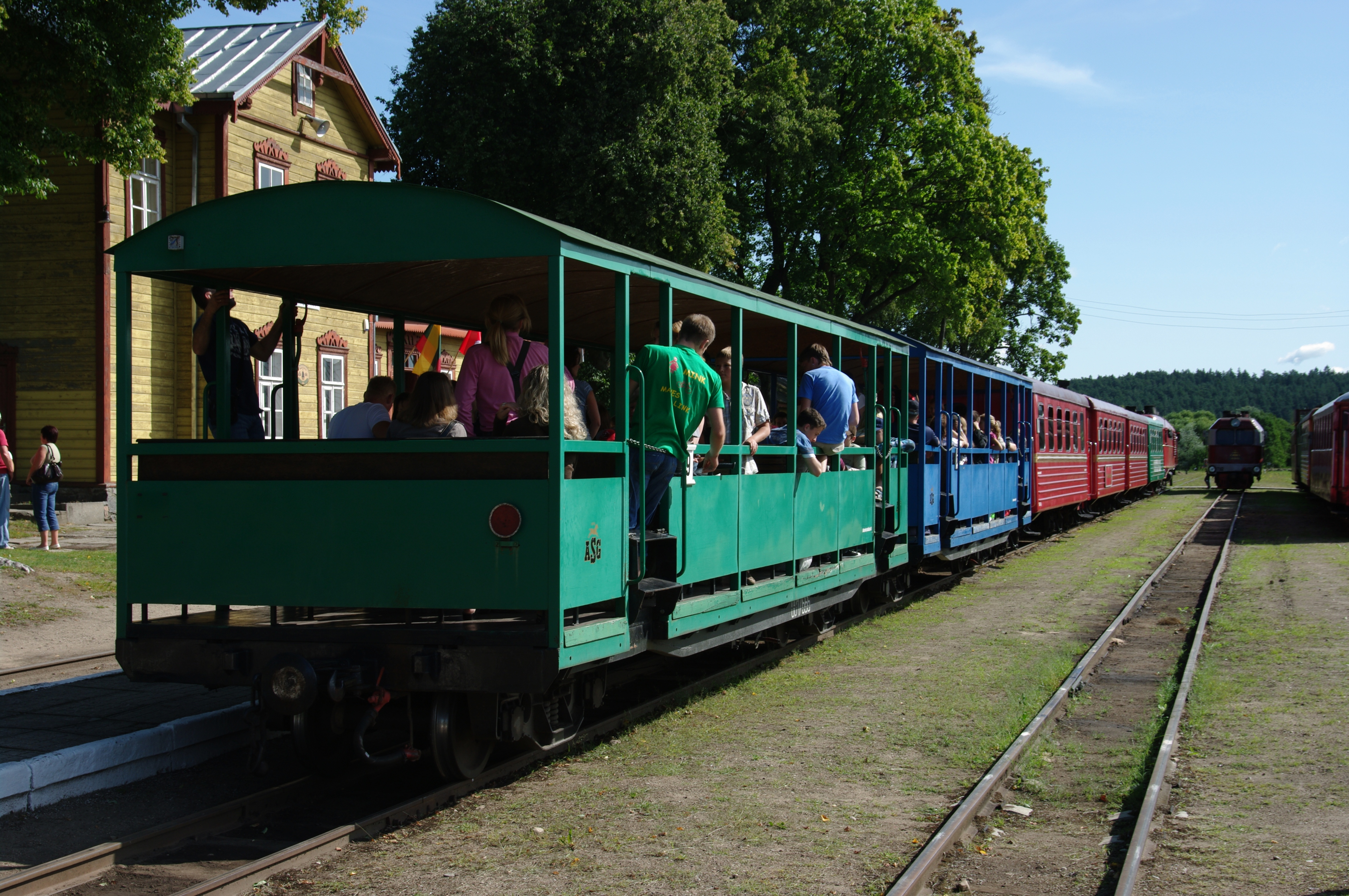
Aukštaitija narrow gauge railway - Anykščiai railway station

After the Soviet occupation, Anykščiai became a center of Aukštaitija partisans. Anykščiai district was the only one in Lithuania which belonged to 5 partisan military districts (apygarda) - Algimantas, Didžiosios Kovos, Vytis, Vytautas and to a third district of Northern Lithuania - Aukštaitija by the Lithuanian Liberty Army. In 2014 in Šimonių giria (The Šimoniai Forest) a cognitive route was created which leads through the places of the Algimantas military district partisan paths and places.

== Transportation ==
Anykščiai is home to a station on the Aukštaitija narrow gauge railway.

Current services
Preceding station	LTG Link	Following station
Terminus	Aukštaitija narrow gauge railway	Bičionys towards Rubikiai
Troškūnai towards Panevėžys	Aukštaitija narrow gauge railway (closed 1996)	Bičionys towards Rubikiai

== Industry ==
Famous in Lithuania fruit winery Anykščių vynas, established in 1926 by Balys Karazija.

== Notable people ==
- Jonas Juozapas Abelevičius, Lithuanian priest
- Antanas Baranauskas, poet, whose home is preserved in Anykščiai Regional Park.
- Jonas Biliūnas, writer
- Giedrius Titenis, swimmer
- Antanas Vienuolis, writer
- Bronė Buivydaitė, writer
- Sergejus Jovaiša, basketball player
- Lewis J. Selznick, producer of early American Cinema and father of David O. Selznick

== Twin towns — sister cities ==
Anykščiai is twinned with:

- Dalaman, Turkey
- Devecser, Hungary
- Dobele, Latvia
- Gardelegen, Germany
- Gnosjö, Sweden
- Krupina, Slovakia
- Madona, Latvia
- Myrhorod, Ukraine
- Myślibórz, Poland
- Nepomuk, Czech Republic
- Omiš, Croatia
- Os, Norway
- Pengzhou, China
- Pietra Ligure, Italy
- Rapla, Estonia
- Sassenage, France
- Sejny, Poland
- Sevan, Armenia
- Ștefan Vodă, Moldova
- Stavanger, Norway
- (Georgia (country)) Telavi, Georgia
- Uniejów, Poland
- Vasylkiv, Ukraine
- Ödeshög, Sweden
