= Czesław Falkowski =

Polish Roman Catholic bishop (1887–1969)

- Bishop of Łomża
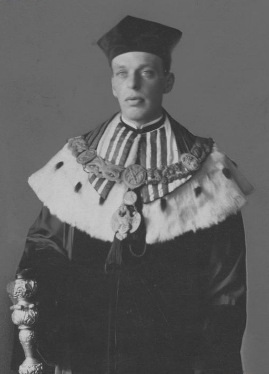

Orders
- Ordination: 26 July 1910
- Consecration: 8 May 1949 by Romuald Jałbrzykowski

Personal details
- Born: 28 December 1887 Warsaw, Congress Poland, Russian Empire
- Died: 25 September 1969 (aged 81) Łomża, Poland

Czesław Andrzej Falkowski (28 December 1887 – 25 September 1969) was a Roman Catholic bishop of the Diocese of Łomża from 1949 until his death in 1969.

== Bibliography ==
Czesław Andrzej Falkowski was born in 1887 in Warsaw to Władysław and Helena (née Boboleckiej) Falkowski. In 1904, he began attending Saint Petersburg Roman Catholic Theological Academy. He went to Innsbruck in 1909 to continue his studies. There, was ordained to the deaconate on 25 July 1910 and was ordained to the priesthood on 26 July 1910 at the Church of the Holy Trinity; he was incardinated to the Archdiocese of Mohilev. He was awarded a doctorate in theology on 18 July 1913.

After returning to Poland, Falkowski was appointed a professor and spiritual father at Saint Petersburg Roman Catholic Theological Academy in 1913. There, he taught homiletics, church history and Polish literature. He became the first professor of church history at the John Paul II Catholic University of Lublin after its formation in 1918, serving as such until 1920.

Moving to Vilnius in 1920, Falkowski was appointed professor of church history at Vilnius University. He was given academic tenure at Vilnius on 29 January 1921 by decree of the Chief of State of Poland. After this, Falkowski served as deputy dean of Vilnius University between 1921 and 1923, dean of faculty between 1926 and 1928, and finally served as rector of the University between 1928 and 1930. After his term as rector, Falkowski also served as deputy rector of Vilnius University between 1930 and 1932. He was made a secret chamberlain of Pope Pius XI in 1932.

On 3 March 1942, Falkowski was arrested by the Gestapo (alongside other professors and alumni of Vilnius University) and held at Lukiškės Prison. He was later transferred to a concentration camp near Šaltupys on 17 October 1942 and was released on 20 October 1943. In February 1945, he began lecturing church history and homiletics at Vilnius University after it moved some of its work to Białystok. He was appointed a professor by decree of the President of Poland on 31 December 1947 and was also a supervisor of learning at the University beginning in February 1948. On 24 February 1949, he was appointed by the Holy See as bishop of the Diocese of Łomża; he was consecrated on 8 May 1949 at the Cathedral of the Assumption in Białystok by Romuald Jałbrzykowski, assisted by Ignacy Świrski and Michał Klepacz.

During his tenure as bishop of Łomża, he formed an association of priests under the Society of Fighters for Freedom and Democracy. He also attended the third and fourth sessions of the Second Vatican Council. He died on 25 September 1969; his funeral was held on 27 September 1969. He was buried at the Cathedral of the Assumption.
