= Elmė =

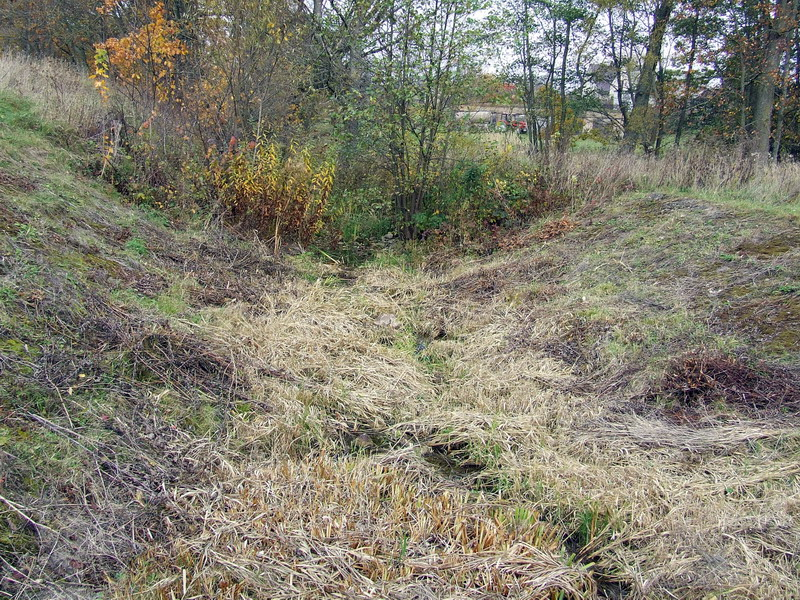

Location
- Country: Lithuania
- Location: Anykščiai district municipality, Utena County

Physical characteristics
- Mouth: Šventoji
  - coordinates: 55.5460°N 25.1208°E

Basin features
- Progression: Šventoji→ Neris→ Neman→ Baltic Sea

The Elmė is a river of Anykščiai district municipality, Utena County, northeastern Lithuania.

The 17.4 kilometres long Elmė is a left-bank tributary of the Šventoji.
