= Bronė Buivydaitė =

Lithuanian teacher, poet, and writer

Bronė Buivydaitė (Mičiulienė) (8 December 1895 – 29 January 1984) was a Lithuanian teacher, poet, and writer also known under her pen name Tyrų Duktė.

== Early life and education ==
Bronė Buivydaitė was born on 8 December 1895 in Svėdasai, Lithuania in the family of a small craftsman. In 1900 her parents moved to Anykščiai where she grew up. Buivydaitė graduated from accounting courses in Kaunas in 1912. In 1914, she graduated from a four-grade school in Utena. During the First World War, Buivydaitė went to Russia, where she worked from 1915 to 1918. In 1918, Buivydaitė graduated from a Lithuanian gymnasium in Voronezh.

== Later life and career ==
From 1918 to 1930, she returned to Lithuania and worked as a teacher of the Lithuanian language in Skoudas, Panevėžys, and Anykščiai. From 1925–1934 Buivydaitė taught at the Panevėžys teachers' seminary, where she gathered a group of drama lovers and directed about 10 stage productions. In 1930, Buivydaitė established a branch of the Children's Theater Society in Panevėžys, and in 1931 opened the children's theater of Panevėžys.

Encouraged by creative success, in 1934 Buivydaitė left her teaching job and engaged only in creative activities, which were the most productive until 1940. After the Second World War until 1948 she taught in Alytus. She was forced to quit school and hide from deportation because her husband was arrested and deported to a Russian camp in Karelia.

After the Second World War, Buivydaitė worked as a teacher in Alytus until 1948.

In 1948 Buivydaitė permanently returned to her native Anykščias, where she hid with friends and nursed her seriously ill mother. War and post-war experiences undermined Buivydaitė’s health. Around 1960 her eyesight began to weaken, which she lost completely in the 1980s.

In 1970, Buivydaitė was admitted to the Lithuanian Society of the Blind, which provided her with some material assistance. Despite her blindness, she wrote several books for children.

She wrote her last works dictating to her secretary, Rozalija Klimašauskaita, who in 1971 was awarded by the Society of the Blind. Buivydaitė worked until the last days of his life.

Since 1957 Buivydaitė was a member of the Lithuanian Writers' Union.

From 1927 to 1967 she was married to teacher Juozas Mičiulis.

Bronė Buivydaitė died on 29 January 1984. She was buried in the Anykščiai old cemetery next to her relatives. The grave is marked by a memorial stone with a portrait bas-relief and the epitaph: „Išėjau į šviesą, kad praregėčiau tiesą“ ("I went into the light to see the truth").

== Poetry ==
Buivydaitė started writing quite early while studying in Kaunas. Her poems and fiction were published in the magazine "Ateities ražaiai" edited by Vincos Mykolaitis-Putinas.

In 1921 she published a collection of poems "Summer Talks". It was the first book by a female poet in Lithuanian literature. Signing under the pseudonym Tyrė Dukters, Buivydaitė created also works for the adults among which five books of poetry and a large novel "Open Leaves", which was the first Lithuanian prose work on a school theme.

Buivydaitė gained popularity with her works for children. In 1936 she received a prize from the Sakalo publishing house for the short story "The Golden Shoe". The writer appeared primarily as a dramatist in children's literature.

In the interwar years, three collections of Buivydaitė’s poems and several books of prose were published. She wrote for children a collection of retellings in verse about Anykščiai - Anykščiai ballads (Anykščių baladės, 1930), fairy tales in verse, and short stories. After the end of World War II, in addition to new poems, she re-edited former works, mainly for children. Wrote the novel "Open Letters" (Atversti lapai, 1934), the libretto for the operas "Bob and the Old People" ("Pupa ir seneliai") by Mikas Vaitkävičius, "Jūratė ir Kąstytis" ("Jūratė ir Kąstytis"; production 1972) by Kazimieras Banaitis.

Some of Buivydaitė’s poems were set to music by Vladas Jakubenas, Oleksandra Dirvyanskaite, and other Lithuanian composers, and became songs.

== Commemoration ==
From 1984 - 1990 the writer's memorial room was installed in Buivydaitė's house, and in 1990 her memorial museum was opened as a branch of the A. Baranauskas and A. Vienuolis-Žukauskas Memorial Museum. A memorial board was installed there the same year (author: Jonas Tvardauskas, 1990). A small sculpture garden has been established and expanded in the homestead, children's literature festivals are organized here, the writer's works are performed, and the Anykštėnai creative bookstore "Auksinis batelis" is open.

Buivydaitė's birthplace in Svėdasais is marked with a commemorative plaque (1990), the street near her birthplace in Svėdasais is named after her. An exposition has been installed in the museum of Svėdasai region (Vaižgant).
