= Šventoji (Neris) =

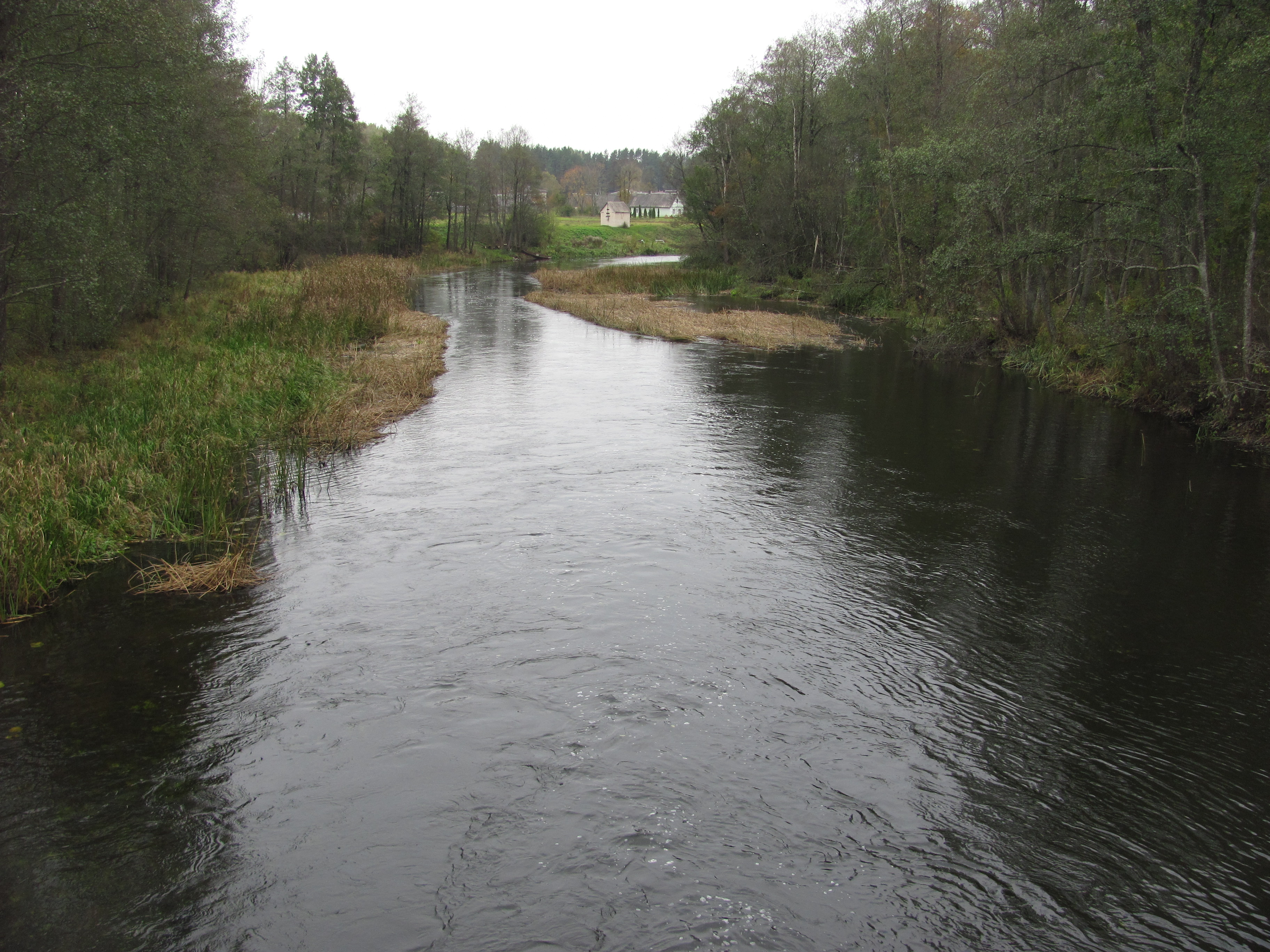

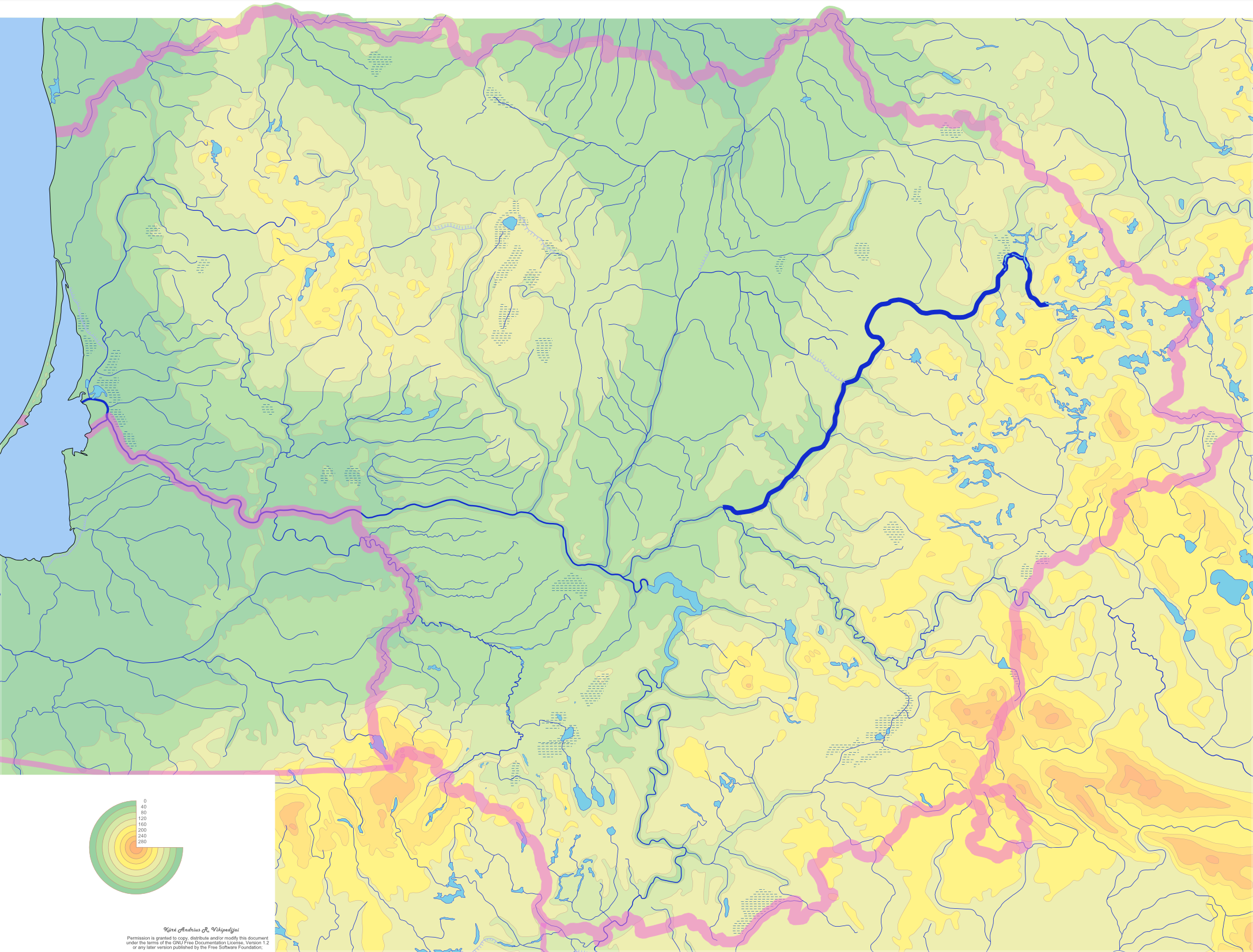

Location
- Country: Lithuania

Physical characteristics
- Source
  - location: Lake Samanis
  - elevation: 225 m (738 ft)
- Mouth: Neris
  - coordinates: 55°05′39″N 24°21′05″E
- Length: 246 km (153 mi)
- Basin size: 6,889 km^{2} (2,660 sq mi)
- Discharge
  - average: 56.1 m^{3}/s (1,980 cu ft/s)

Basin features
- Progression: Neris→ Neman→ Baltic Sea

The Šventoji (Lithuanian: [ɕvʲɛnˈtôːjɪ]; lit. The Holy One) is the longest river that flows entirely within Lithuania and the largest tributary of the Neris. It originates from Lake Samanis in the Gražutė Regional Park and flows into the Neris near Jonava. The longest tributary of the Šventoji is the Širvinta.

The Šventoji passes through the cities of Anykščiai, Kavarskas and Ukmergė. In 1963–1964 a dam near Kavarskas was built to replenish the Nevėžis using water from the Šventoji. However, the dam is no longer used for being too expensive, ineffective, and violating environmental regulations of the European Union. In 1959, the Antalieptė Reservoir, the second largest artificial lake in Lithuania, was built on the Šventoji.

== Tributaries ==
The following rivers are tributaries to the river Šventoji (from source to mouth):

- Left: Šavaša, Vyžuona, Aknysta, Taurožė, Beržuona, Elmė, Anykšta, Virinta, Dagia, Širvinta
- Right: Kriauna, Nasvė, Jara, Pelyša, Vadaksta, Grieža, Latava, Biebė
