= List of minor planets: 431001–432000 =

The following is a partial list of minor planets, running from minor-planet number 431001 through 432000, inclusive. The primary data for this and other partial lists is based on JPL's "Small-Body Orbital Elements" and data available from the Minor Planet Center. Critical list information is also provided by the MPC, unless otherwise specified from Lowell Observatory. A detailed description of the table's columns and additional sources are given on the main page including a complete list of every page in this series, and a statistical break-up on the dynamical classification of minor planets.

Also see the summary list of all named bodies in numerical and alphabetical order, and the corresponding naming citations for the number range of this particular list. New namings may only be added to this list after official publication, as the preannouncement of names is condemned by the Working Group for Small Bodies Nomenclature of the International Astronomical Union.

Near-Earth obj.	MBA (inner)	MBA (outer)	Centaur
Mars-crosser	MBA (middle)	Jupiter trojan	Trans-Neptunian obj.
Unclassified

== 431001–431100 ==
Designation			Discovery			Properties		Ref
Permanent	Provisional	Named after	Date	Site	Discoverer(s)	Category	Diam.	Ref
431001	2005 YD_{21}	—	February 8, 2002	Kitt Peak	Spacewatch	·	1.1 km	MPC · JPL
431002	2005 YY_{23}	—	December 24, 2005	Kitt Peak	Spacewatch	MIS	1.9 km	MPC · JPL
431003	2005 YJ_{26}	—	December 24, 2005	Kitt Peak	Spacewatch	·	1.1 km	MPC · JPL
431004	2005 YF_{47}	—	December 25, 2005	Kitt Peak	Spacewatch	·	1.2 km	MPC · JPL
431005	2005 YF_{68}	—	December 5, 2005	Mount Lemmon	Mount Lemmon Survey	·	1.3 km	MPC · JPL
431006	2005 YM_{73}	—	December 24, 2005	Kitt Peak	Spacewatch	·	1.2 km	MPC · JPL
431007	2005 YR_{73}	—	December 24, 2005	Catalina	CSS	·	1.5 km	MPC · JPL
431008	2005 YN_{78}	—	December 24, 2005	Kitt Peak	Spacewatch	·	1.2 km	MPC · JPL
431009	2005 YR_{78}	—	December 8, 2005	Kitt Peak	Spacewatch	·	1.2 km	MPC · JPL
431010	2005 YR_{85}	—	December 25, 2005	Mount Lemmon	Mount Lemmon Survey	·	1.8 km	MPC · JPL
431011	2005 YA_{87}	—	December 25, 2005	Mount Lemmon	Mount Lemmon Survey	·	860 m	MPC · JPL
431012	2005 YU_{97}	—	December 24, 2005	Kitt Peak	Spacewatch	(5)	1.3 km	MPC · JPL
431013	2005 YM_{105}	—	December 25, 2005	Kitt Peak	Spacewatch	EUN	1.3 km	MPC · JPL
431014	2005 YW_{121}	—	December 28, 2005	Mount Lemmon	Mount Lemmon Survey	·	1.1 km	MPC · JPL
431015	2005 YD_{130}	—	October 29, 2005	Mount Lemmon	Mount Lemmon Survey	·	1.3 km	MPC · JPL
431016	2005 YX_{130}	—	December 25, 2005	Mount Lemmon	Mount Lemmon Survey	·	1.5 km	MPC · JPL
431017	2005 YQ_{132}	—	December 26, 2005	Kitt Peak	Spacewatch	(5)	1.4 km	MPC · JPL
431018	2005 YH_{139}	—	December 28, 2005	Kitt Peak	Spacewatch	·	2.7 km	MPC · JPL
431019	2005 YY_{145}	—	December 29, 2005	Socorro	LINEAR	·	1.8 km	MPC · JPL
431020	2005 YJ_{146}	—	December 29, 2005	Mount Lemmon	Mount Lemmon Survey	·	1.2 km	MPC · JPL
431021	2005 YH_{148}	—	December 25, 2005	Kitt Peak	Spacewatch	·	1.5 km	MPC · JPL
431022	2005 YM_{175}	—	December 22, 2005	Kitt Peak	Spacewatch	·	1.2 km	MPC · JPL
431023	2005 YL_{199}	—	December 25, 2005	Mount Lemmon	Mount Lemmon Survey	·	1.5 km	MPC · JPL
431024	2005 YR_{201}	—	December 24, 2005	Kitt Peak	Spacewatch	·	1.3 km	MPC · JPL
431025	2005 YA_{212}	—	December 28, 2005	Catalina	CSS	·	1.5 km	MPC · JPL
431026	2005 YB_{238}	—	December 28, 2005	Mount Lemmon	Mount Lemmon Survey	·	1.8 km	MPC · JPL
431027	2005 YV_{282}	—	December 7, 2005	Kitt Peak	Spacewatch	·	1.4 km	MPC · JPL
431028	2006 AX_{14}	—	January 5, 2006	Mount Lemmon	Mount Lemmon Survey	·	1.7 km	MPC · JPL
431029	2006 AT_{35}	—	October 1, 2005	Mount Lemmon	Mount Lemmon Survey	·	1.5 km	MPC · JPL
431030	2006 AE_{46}	—	December 27, 2005	Mount Lemmon	Mount Lemmon Survey	·	2.3 km	MPC · JPL
431031	2006 AY_{56}	—	January 7, 2006	Mount Lemmon	Mount Lemmon Survey	·	1.2 km	MPC · JPL
431032	2006 AE_{59}	—	January 4, 2006	Kitt Peak	Spacewatch	(5)	1.4 km	MPC · JPL
431033	2006 AW_{61}	—	January 5, 2006	Kitt Peak	Spacewatch	·	1.1 km	MPC · JPL
431034	2006 AP_{78}	—	January 4, 2006	Kitt Peak	Spacewatch	·	1.5 km	MPC · JPL
431035	2006 AC_{81}	—	January 2, 2006	Socorro	LINEAR	·	2.4 km	MPC · JPL
431036	2006 AB_{86}	—	January 12, 2006	Palomar	NEAT	·	1.5 km	MPC · JPL
431037	2006 AJ_{90}	—	January 6, 2006	Mount Lemmon	Mount Lemmon Survey	·	1.4 km	MPC · JPL
431038	2006 AA_{95}	—	January 9, 2006	Kitt Peak	Spacewatch	(5)	1.4 km	MPC · JPL
431039	2006 BZ_{1}	—	January 20, 2006	Kitt Peak	Spacewatch	·	1.5 km	MPC · JPL
431040	2006 BQ_{11}	—	January 21, 2006	Kitt Peak	Spacewatch	·	1.7 km	MPC · JPL
431041	2006 BT_{19}	—	January 22, 2006	Mount Lemmon	Mount Lemmon Survey	(5)	1.2 km	MPC · JPL
431042	2006 BV_{20}	—	January 5, 2006	Mount Lemmon	Mount Lemmon Survey	·	1.4 km	MPC · JPL
431043	2006 BP_{22}	—	January 7, 2006	Mount Lemmon	Mount Lemmon Survey	·	1.5 km	MPC · JPL
431044	2006 BU_{23}	—	January 23, 2006	Socorro	LINEAR	·	2.6 km	MPC · JPL
431045	2006 BH_{40}	—	January 20, 2006	Kitt Peak	Spacewatch	·	2.0 km	MPC · JPL
431046	2006 BG_{48}	—	January 25, 2006	Kitt Peak	Spacewatch	·	1.3 km	MPC · JPL
431047	2006 BM_{50}	—	January 7, 2006	Kitt Peak	Spacewatch	·	1.3 km	MPC · JPL
431048	2006 BM_{52}	—	January 25, 2006	Kitt Peak	Spacewatch	·	2.4 km	MPC · JPL
431049	2006 BR_{64}	—	November 14, 1996	Kitt Peak	Spacewatch	·	1.5 km	MPC · JPL
431050	2006 BJ_{72}	—	January 23, 2006	Kitt Peak	Spacewatch	(5)	1.5 km	MPC · JPL
431051	2006 BX_{82}	—	January 24, 2006	Socorro	LINEAR	·	2.9 km	MPC · JPL
431052	2006 BZ_{90}	—	January 26, 2006	Kitt Peak	Spacewatch	·	1.5 km	MPC · JPL
431053	2006 BW_{119}	—	January 26, 2006	Kitt Peak	Spacewatch	·	1.5 km	MPC · JPL
431054	2006 BM_{122}	—	January 26, 2006	Kitt Peak	Spacewatch	·	2.3 km	MPC · JPL
431055	2006 BW_{127}	—	January 26, 2006	Kitt Peak	Spacewatch	·	1.7 km	MPC · JPL
431056	2006 BY_{127}	—	January 26, 2006	Kitt Peak	Spacewatch	AGN	1.1 km	MPC · JPL
431057	2006 BL_{135}	—	February 12, 2002	Kitt Peak	Spacewatch	·	1.5 km	MPC · JPL
431058	2006 BG_{138}	—	January 28, 2006	Mount Lemmon	Mount Lemmon Survey	WIT	970 m	MPC · JPL
431059	2006 BA_{158}	—	January 25, 2006	Kitt Peak	Spacewatch	·	1.7 km	MPC · JPL
431060	2006 BU_{168}	—	January 26, 2006	Mount Lemmon	Mount Lemmon Survey	·	1.8 km	MPC · JPL
431061	2006 BK_{174}	—	January 23, 2006	Kitt Peak	Spacewatch	(5)	1.3 km	MPC · JPL
431062	2006 BL_{184}	—	January 28, 2006	Mount Lemmon	Mount Lemmon Survey	·	1.5 km	MPC · JPL
431063	2006 BD_{185}	—	January 28, 2006	Mount Lemmon	Mount Lemmon Survey	·	1.2 km	MPC · JPL
431064	2006 BK_{192}	—	January 23, 2006	Mount Lemmon	Mount Lemmon Survey	·	1.4 km	MPC · JPL
431065	2006 BR_{207}	—	January 31, 2006	Mount Lemmon	Mount Lemmon Survey	EUN	1.3 km	MPC · JPL
431066	2006 BD_{208}	—	January 31, 2006	Catalina	CSS	·	2.6 km	MPC · JPL
431067	2006 BB_{221}	—	January 30, 2006	Kitt Peak	Spacewatch	·	1.4 km	MPC · JPL
431068	2006 BP_{232}	—	January 23, 2006	Kitt Peak	Spacewatch	·	1.5 km	MPC · JPL
431069	2006 BJ_{233}	—	January 31, 2006	Kitt Peak	Spacewatch	·	1.2 km	MPC · JPL
431070	2006 BL_{243}	—	January 25, 2006	Kitt Peak	Spacewatch	(5)	1.2 km	MPC · JPL
431071	2006 BW_{257}	—	January 25, 2006	Kitt Peak	Spacewatch	·	1.5 km	MPC · JPL
431072	2006 BW_{262}	—	January 31, 2006	Kitt Peak	Spacewatch	·	1.3 km	MPC · JPL
431073	2006 CQ_{13}	—	January 23, 2006	Mount Lemmon	Mount Lemmon Survey	·	1.4 km	MPC · JPL
431074	2006 CW_{21}	—	February 1, 2006	Kitt Peak	Spacewatch	·	1.6 km	MPC · JPL
431075	2006 CY_{46}	—	January 25, 2006	Kitt Peak	Spacewatch	(17392)	1.8 km	MPC · JPL
431076	2006 CW_{61}	—	February 3, 2006	Socorro	LINEAR	·	2.0 km	MPC · JPL
431077	2006 CA_{67}	—	February 7, 2006	Kitt Peak	Spacewatch	·	1.7 km	MPC · JPL
431078	2006 DR_{22}	—	February 20, 2006	Kitt Peak	Spacewatch	·	1.5 km	MPC · JPL
431079	2006 DO_{23}	—	January 31, 2006	Kitt Peak	Spacewatch	WIT	1.0 km	MPC · JPL
431080	2006 DO_{25}	—	February 20, 2006	Kitt Peak	Spacewatch	MIS	1.9 km	MPC · JPL
431081	2006 DE_{29}	—	February 1, 2006	Kitt Peak	Spacewatch	·	2.3 km	MPC · JPL
431082	2006 DK_{29}	—	February 1, 2006	Kitt Peak	Spacewatch	(5)	1.3 km	MPC · JPL
431083	2006 DO_{34}	—	February 20, 2006	Kitt Peak	Spacewatch	·	2.0 km	MPC · JPL
431084	2006 DL_{43}	—	February 20, 2006	Kitt Peak	Spacewatch	·	1.8 km	MPC · JPL
431085	2006 DL_{57}	—	February 24, 2006	Mount Lemmon	Mount Lemmon Survey	GEF	1.2 km	MPC · JPL
431086	2006 DM_{75}	—	February 24, 2006	Kitt Peak	Spacewatch	·	1.6 km	MPC · JPL
431087	2006 DM_{94}	—	February 24, 2006	Kitt Peak	Spacewatch	·	1.7 km	MPC · JPL
431088	2006 DH_{97}	—	February 24, 2006	Kitt Peak	Spacewatch	·	1.6 km	MPC · JPL
431089	2006 DH_{103}	—	February 25, 2006	Mount Lemmon	Mount Lemmon Survey	·	2.1 km	MPC · JPL
431090	2006 DP_{103}	—	February 25, 2006	Mount Lemmon	Mount Lemmon Survey	·	2.3 km	MPC · JPL
431091	2006 DU_{108}	—	February 25, 2006	Kitt Peak	Spacewatch	·	1.7 km	MPC · JPL
431092	2006 DF_{112}	—	February 27, 2006	Mount Lemmon	Mount Lemmon Survey	MAR	1.2 km	MPC · JPL
431093	2006 DQ_{138}	—	February 25, 2006	Kitt Peak	Spacewatch	·	2.9 km	MPC · JPL
431094	2006 DD_{165}	—	February 27, 2006	Kitt Peak	Spacewatch	·	1.6 km	MPC · JPL
431095	2006 DN_{168}	—	February 27, 2006	Kitt Peak	Spacewatch	·	1.7 km	MPC · JPL
431096	2006 DY_{170}	—	February 27, 2006	Kitt Peak	Spacewatch	·	1.5 km	MPC · JPL
431097	2006 DK_{185}	—	February 27, 2006	Kitt Peak	Spacewatch	·	2.1 km	MPC · JPL
431098	2006 DL_{205}	—	February 25, 2006	Mount Lemmon	Mount Lemmon Survey	·	1.3 km	MPC · JPL
431099	2006 DH_{212}	—	February 25, 2006	Mount Lemmon	Mount Lemmon Survey	·	2.6 km	MPC · JPL
431100	2006 EL_{4}	—	March 2, 2006	Kitt Peak	Spacewatch	·	1.4 km	MPC · JPL

== 431101–431200 ==
back to top

Designation			Discovery			Properties		Ref
Permanent	Provisional	Named after	Date	Site	Discoverer(s)	Category	Diam.	Ref
431101	2006 EP_{8}	—	March 2, 2006	Kitt Peak	Spacewatch	·	1.4 km	MPC · JPL
431102	2006 EH_{22}	—	January 31, 2006	Kitt Peak	Spacewatch	·	1.4 km	MPC · JPL
431103	2006 EX_{28}	—	March 3, 2006	Kitt Peak	Spacewatch	·	1.2 km	MPC · JPL
431104	2006 FP_{1}	—	February 20, 2006	Mount Lemmon	Mount Lemmon Survey	·	1.9 km	MPC · JPL
431105	2006 FM_{28}	—	March 24, 2006	Mount Lemmon	Mount Lemmon Survey	·	1.9 km	MPC · JPL
431106	2006 FH_{43}	—	March 29, 2006	Socorro	LINEAR	·	2.5 km	MPC · JPL
431107	2006 GU	—	April 2, 2006	Catalina	CSS	AMO +1km	1.3 km	MPC · JPL
431108	2006 GW_{23}	—	April 2, 2006	Kitt Peak	Spacewatch	·	2.3 km	MPC · JPL
431109	2006 GC_{25}	—	March 26, 2006	Mount Lemmon	Mount Lemmon Survey	GEF	1.2 km	MPC · JPL
431110	2006 GV_{32}	—	April 7, 2006	Mount Lemmon	Mount Lemmon Survey	·	1.6 km	MPC · JPL
431111	2006 GQ_{39}	—	April 2, 2006	Anderson Mesa	LONEOS	·	2.1 km	MPC · JPL
431112	2006 GM_{43}	—	March 25, 2006	Kitt Peak	Spacewatch	·	2.3 km	MPC · JPL
431113	2006 HJ_{10}	—	April 19, 2006	Kitt Peak	Spacewatch	·	2.5 km	MPC · JPL
431114	2006 HA_{20}	—	April 19, 2006	Mount Lemmon	Mount Lemmon Survey	·	2.0 km	MPC · JPL
431115	2006 HT_{33}	—	April 2, 2006	Kitt Peak	Spacewatch	·	1.8 km	MPC · JPL
431116	2006 HN_{34}	—	April 19, 2006	Catalina	CSS	·	2.1 km	MPC · JPL
431117	2006 HE_{41}	—	April 21, 2006	Kitt Peak	Spacewatch	·	2.2 km	MPC · JPL
431118	2006 HE_{60}	—	April 26, 2006	Anderson Mesa	LONEOS	·	2.3 km	MPC · JPL
431119	2006 HD_{77}	—	March 5, 2006	Kitt Peak	Spacewatch	·	2.2 km	MPC · JPL
431120	2006 HB_{83}	—	April 26, 2006	Kitt Peak	Spacewatch	·	2.9 km	MPC · JPL
431121	2006 HT_{86}	—	April 29, 2006	Kitt Peak	Spacewatch	·	2.2 km	MPC · JPL
431122	2006 JJ_{17}	—	May 2, 2006	Kitt Peak	Spacewatch	·	1.8 km	MPC · JPL
431123	2006 JD_{81}	—	May 1, 2006	Catalina	CSS	·	3.0 km	MPC · JPL
431124	2006 KA_{9}	—	May 19, 2006	Mount Lemmon	Mount Lemmon Survey	KOR	1.5 km	MPC · JPL
431125	2006 KM_{13}	—	May 20, 2006	Kitt Peak	Spacewatch	·	2.3 km	MPC · JPL
431126	2006 KY_{15}	—	May 20, 2006	Palomar	NEAT	·	2.2 km	MPC · JPL
431127	2006 KT_{33}	—	May 20, 2006	Kitt Peak	Spacewatch	·	1.7 km	MPC · JPL
431128	2006 KL_{37}	—	May 22, 2006	Kitt Peak	Spacewatch	·	1.8 km	MPC · JPL
431129	2006 KW_{41}	—	May 20, 2006	Mount Lemmon	Mount Lemmon Survey	AST	1.6 km	MPC · JPL
431130	2006 KD_{44}	—	May 21, 2006	Kitt Peak	Spacewatch	·	1.9 km	MPC · JPL
431131	2006 KJ_{53}	—	May 21, 2006	Kitt Peak	Spacewatch	·	2.0 km	MPC · JPL
431132	2006 KX_{53}	—	May 21, 2006	Kitt Peak	Spacewatch	·	2.6 km	MPC · JPL
431133	2006 KN_{58}	—	May 22, 2006	Kitt Peak	Spacewatch	·	2.2 km	MPC · JPL
431134	2006 KA_{59}	—	May 22, 2006	Kitt Peak	Spacewatch	·	1.9 km	MPC · JPL
431135	2006 KD_{88}	—	May 19, 2006	Catalina	CSS	GEF	1.5 km	MPC · JPL
431136	2006 KO_{93}	—	May 25, 2006	Kitt Peak	Spacewatch	KOR	1.2 km	MPC · JPL
431137	2006 QE_{11}	—	August 21, 2006	Kitt Peak	Spacewatch	·	3.1 km	MPC · JPL
431138	2006 QN_{16}	—	August 17, 2006	Palomar	NEAT	·	490 m	MPC · JPL
431139	2006 QJ_{26}	—	August 19, 2006	Kitt Peak	Spacewatch	·	720 m	MPC · JPL
431140	2006 QC_{32}	—	August 19, 2006	Kitt Peak	Spacewatch	EOS	2.0 km	MPC · JPL
431141	2006 QJ_{44}	—	August 19, 2006	Anderson Mesa	LONEOS	·	860 m	MPC · JPL
431142	2006 QU_{58}	—	August 19, 2006	Palomar	NEAT	·	2.9 km	MPC · JPL
431143	2006 QB_{65}	—	August 19, 2006	Kitt Peak	Spacewatch	·	3.0 km	MPC · JPL
431144	2006 QD_{69}	—	August 21, 2006	Kitt Peak	Spacewatch	·	2.2 km	MPC · JPL
431145	2006 QZ_{87}	—	August 27, 2006	Kitt Peak	Spacewatch	·	540 m	MPC · JPL
431146	2006 QW_{108}	—	August 28, 2006	Kitt Peak	Spacewatch	·	770 m	MPC · JPL
431147	2006 QV_{115}	—	August 27, 2006	Anderson Mesa	LONEOS	·	3.3 km	MPC · JPL
431148	2006 QR_{117}	—	August 21, 2006	Socorro	LINEAR	·	660 m	MPC · JPL
431149	2006 QM_{136}	—	August 29, 2006	Anderson Mesa	LONEOS	·	880 m	MPC · JPL
431150	2006 QN_{151}	—	August 19, 2006	Kitt Peak	Spacewatch	·	2.7 km	MPC · JPL
431151	2006 QO_{157}	—	August 19, 2006	Kitt Peak	Spacewatch	·	2.9 km	MPC · JPL
431152	2006 QD_{160}	—	August 19, 2006	Kitt Peak	Spacewatch	·	2.5 km	MPC · JPL
431153	2006 QE_{162}	—	August 20, 2006	Kitt Peak	Spacewatch	·	2.5 km	MPC · JPL
431154	2006 QV_{165}	—	August 29, 2006	Catalina	CSS	·	670 m	MPC · JPL
431155	2006 QC_{186}	—	August 28, 2006	Anderson Mesa	LONEOS	·	950 m	MPC · JPL
431156	2006 QG_{186}	—	August 27, 2006	Kitt Peak	Spacewatch	·	2.5 km	MPC · JPL
431157	2006 QL_{186}	—	August 19, 2006	Kitt Peak	Spacewatch	·	2.7 km	MPC · JPL
431158	2006 RO_{2}	—	September 11, 2006	Bergisch Gladbach	W. Bickel	EOS	2.5 km	MPC · JPL
431159	2006 RR_{8}	—	August 27, 2006	Anderson Mesa	LONEOS	·	870 m	MPC · JPL
431160	2006 RL_{14}	—	September 14, 2006	Kitt Peak	Spacewatch	·	2.2 km	MPC · JPL
431161	2006 RN_{14}	—	September 14, 2006	Kitt Peak	Spacewatch	EOS	1.6 km	MPC · JPL
431162	2006 RN_{20}	—	September 15, 2006	Socorro	LINEAR	·	3.8 km	MPC · JPL
431163	2006 RP_{41}	—	September 14, 2006	Kitt Peak	Spacewatch	·	2.3 km	MPC · JPL
431164	2006 RD_{44}	—	September 14, 2006	Kitt Peak	Spacewatch	·	880 m	MPC · JPL
431165	2006 RC_{45}	—	September 14, 2006	Kitt Peak	Spacewatch	·	3.3 km	MPC · JPL
431166	2006 RT_{46}	—	September 14, 2006	Kitt Peak	Spacewatch	ERI	1.4 km	MPC · JPL
431167	2006 RZ_{46}	—	September 14, 2006	Kitt Peak	Spacewatch	·	3.1 km	MPC · JPL
431168	2006 RM_{56}	—	September 14, 2006	Kitt Peak	Spacewatch	·	710 m	MPC · JPL
431169	2006 RN_{57}	—	September 15, 2006	Kitt Peak	Spacewatch	·	630 m	MPC · JPL
431170	2006 RL_{78}	—	September 15, 2006	Kitt Peak	Spacewatch	·	2.1 km	MPC · JPL
431171	2006 RL_{85}	—	September 15, 2006	Kitt Peak	Spacewatch	·	1.7 km	MPC · JPL
431172	2006 RQ_{85}	—	September 15, 2006	Kitt Peak	Spacewatch	·	580 m	MPC · JPL
431173	2006 RF_{91}	—	September 15, 2006	Kitt Peak	Spacewatch	·	2.5 km	MPC · JPL
431174	2006 RX_{92}	—	September 15, 2006	Kitt Peak	Spacewatch	·	770 m	MPC · JPL
431175	2006 RV_{122}	—	September 14, 2006	Catalina	CSS	·	2.7 km	MPC · JPL
431176	2006 SS	—	September 16, 2006	Catalina	CSS	·	780 m	MPC · JPL
431177	2006 SJ_{11}	—	August 28, 2006	Anderson Mesa	LONEOS	·	680 m	MPC · JPL
431178	2006 SZ_{32}	—	July 21, 2006	Mount Lemmon	Mount Lemmon Survey	NYS	1.2 km	MPC · JPL
431179	2006 SW_{40}	—	September 18, 2006	Kitt Peak	Spacewatch	·	2.8 km	MPC · JPL
431180	2006 SG_{41}	—	September 18, 2006	Catalina	CSS	MAS	650 m	MPC · JPL
431181	2006 SC_{45}	—	September 18, 2006	Kitt Peak	Spacewatch	EOS	1.8 km	MPC · JPL
431182	2006 SD_{45}	—	September 18, 2006	Kitt Peak	Spacewatch	·	2.8 km	MPC · JPL
431183	2006 SX_{54}	—	September 18, 2006	Catalina	CSS	·	880 m	MPC · JPL
431184	2006 SL_{59}	—	August 19, 2006	Anderson Mesa	LONEOS	·	900 m	MPC · JPL
431185	2006 SZ_{62}	—	September 18, 2006	Anderson Mesa	LONEOS	·	3.0 km	MPC · JPL
431186	2006 SV_{75}	—	September 19, 2006	Kitt Peak	Spacewatch	·	2.7 km	MPC · JPL
431187	2006 SM_{76}	—	September 19, 2006	Kitt Peak	Spacewatch	·	790 m	MPC · JPL
431188	2006 SH_{78}	—	August 30, 2006	Anderson Mesa	LONEOS	THB	3.7 km	MPC · JPL
431189	2006 SH_{83}	—	September 18, 2006	Kitt Peak	Spacewatch	·	4.3 km	MPC · JPL
431190	2006 SC_{84}	—	September 18, 2006	Kitt Peak	Spacewatch	·	760 m	MPC · JPL
431191	2006 SH_{88}	—	September 18, 2006	Kitt Peak	Spacewatch	·	710 m	MPC · JPL
431192	2006 SB_{91}	—	September 18, 2006	Kitt Peak	Spacewatch	·	3.4 km	MPC · JPL
431193	2006 SL_{99}	—	September 18, 2006	Kitt Peak	Spacewatch	·	800 m	MPC · JPL
431194	2006 SB_{103}	—	September 19, 2006	Kitt Peak	Spacewatch	·	730 m	MPC · JPL
431195	2006 SY_{104}	—	September 19, 2006	Catalina	CSS	·	5.3 km	MPC · JPL
431196	2006 SU_{108}	—	September 19, 2006	Catalina	CSS	·	4.3 km	MPC · JPL
431197	2006 SG_{117}	—	September 24, 2006	Kitt Peak	Spacewatch	NYS	760 m	MPC · JPL
431198	2006 SG_{120}	—	September 18, 2006	Catalina	CSS	·	2.9 km	MPC · JPL
431199	2006 SK_{129}	—	September 18, 2006	Anderson Mesa	LONEOS	·	700 m	MPC · JPL
431200	2006 SH_{135}	—	September 20, 2006	Catalina	CSS	·	3.2 km	MPC · JPL

== 431201–431300 ==
back to top

Designation			Discovery			Properties		Ref
Permanent	Provisional	Named after	Date	Site	Discoverer(s)	Category	Diam.	Ref
431201	2006 ST_{137}	—	September 20, 2006	Catalina	CSS	·	3.6 km	MPC · JPL
431202	2006 SV_{149}	—	September 19, 2006	Kitt Peak	Spacewatch	·	680 m	MPC · JPL
431203	2006 SZ_{150}	—	September 19, 2006	Kitt Peak	Spacewatch	·	790 m	MPC · JPL
431204	2006 SY_{153}	—	September 20, 2006	Catalina	CSS	·	2.1 km	MPC · JPL
431205	2006 SZ_{157}	—	September 15, 2006	Kitt Peak	Spacewatch	·	630 m	MPC · JPL
431206	2006 SR_{164}	—	September 25, 2006	Kitt Peak	Spacewatch	·	3.4 km	MPC · JPL
431207	2006 SZ_{170}	—	September 17, 2006	Kitt Peak	Spacewatch	·	700 m	MPC · JPL
431208	2006 SE_{179}	—	September 25, 2006	Kitt Peak	Spacewatch	·	820 m	MPC · JPL
431209	2006 SP_{179}	—	September 25, 2006	Kitt Peak	Spacewatch	EOS	1.7 km	MPC · JPL
431210	2006 SA_{187}	—	September 25, 2006	Mount Lemmon	Mount Lemmon Survey	NYS	950 m	MPC · JPL
431211	2006 SB_{204}	—	September 18, 2006	Kitt Peak	Spacewatch	·	3.2 km	MPC · JPL
431212	2006 SJ_{206}	—	September 25, 2006	Kitt Peak	Spacewatch	·	3.7 km	MPC · JPL
431213	2006 SW_{215}	—	September 27, 2006	Kitt Peak	Spacewatch	·	680 m	MPC · JPL
431214	2006 SU_{220}	—	September 14, 2006	Kitt Peak	Spacewatch	·	710 m	MPC · JPL
431215	2006 SE_{228}	—	September 26, 2006	Kitt Peak	Spacewatch	·	3.1 km	MPC · JPL
431216	2006 SS_{233}	—	September 26, 2006	Kitt Peak	Spacewatch	·	2.5 km	MPC · JPL
431217	2006 SV_{240}	—	September 18, 2006	Kitt Peak	Spacewatch	HYG	2.6 km	MPC · JPL
431218	2006 SK_{242}	—	September 26, 2006	Kitt Peak	Spacewatch	·	650 m	MPC · JPL
431219	2006 SW_{244}	—	September 26, 2006	Kitt Peak	Spacewatch	·	2.6 km	MPC · JPL
431220	2006 SE_{251}	—	September 26, 2006	Kitt Peak	Spacewatch	·	770 m	MPC · JPL
431221	2006 SF_{259}	—	September 26, 2006	Kitt Peak	Spacewatch	·	660 m	MPC · JPL
431222	2006 SC_{267}	—	September 26, 2006	Kitt Peak	Spacewatch	·	2.8 km	MPC · JPL
431223	2006 SA_{284}	—	September 26, 2006	Catalina	CSS	·	3.3 km	MPC · JPL
431224	2006 SN_{297}	—	September 25, 2006	Mount Lemmon	Mount Lemmon Survey	MAS	690 m	MPC · JPL
431225	2006 SF_{299}	—	September 26, 2006	Kitt Peak	Spacewatch	·	650 m	MPC · JPL
431226	2006 SK_{323}	—	September 27, 2006	Kitt Peak	Spacewatch	·	910 m	MPC · JPL
431227	2006 SK_{324}	—	September 17, 2006	Kitt Peak	Spacewatch	·	2.9 km	MPC · JPL
431228	2006 ST_{326}	—	September 19, 2006	Kitt Peak	Spacewatch	·	3.1 km	MPC · JPL
431229	2006 SJ_{330}	—	September 27, 2006	Kitt Peak	Spacewatch	·	3.1 km	MPC · JPL
431230	2006 SR_{343}	—	September 28, 2006	Kitt Peak	Spacewatch	·	2.9 km	MPC · JPL
431231	2006 SC_{360}	—	September 30, 2006	Mount Lemmon	Mount Lemmon Survey	·	830 m	MPC · JPL
431232	2006 SW_{364}	—	September 30, 2006	Catalina	CSS	·	680 m	MPC · JPL
431233	2006 SG_{375}	—	September 17, 2006	Apache Point	A. C. Becker	·	2.4 km	MPC · JPL
431234	2006 SP_{388}	—	September 30, 2006	Apache Point	A. C. Becker	·	3.1 km	MPC · JPL
431235	2006 SU_{389}	—	September 30, 2006	Apache Point	A. C. Becker	·	2.8 km	MPC · JPL
431236	2006 SC_{394}	—	September 30, 2006	Kitt Peak	Spacewatch	·	650 m	MPC · JPL
431237	2006 SS_{399}	—	September 18, 2006	Catalina	CSS	·	3.7 km	MPC · JPL
431238	2006 SX_{400}	—	September 26, 2006	Mount Lemmon	Mount Lemmon Survey	·	3.7 km	MPC · JPL
431239	2006 TR_{15}	—	October 11, 2006	Kitt Peak	Spacewatch	·	3.9 km	MPC · JPL
431240	2006 TX_{17}	—	October 11, 2006	Kitt Peak	Spacewatch	MAS	780 m	MPC · JPL
431241	2006 TX_{25}	—	September 25, 2006	Mount Lemmon	Mount Lemmon Survey	·	3.2 km	MPC · JPL
431242	2006 TE_{39}	—	September 27, 2006	Mount Lemmon	Mount Lemmon Survey	·	1.0 km	MPC · JPL
431243	2006 TT_{40}	—	October 12, 2006	Kitt Peak	Spacewatch	·	2.8 km	MPC · JPL
431244	2006 TE_{48}	—	October 12, 2006	Kitt Peak	Spacewatch	THM	2.5 km	MPC · JPL
431245	2006 TX_{57}	—	October 15, 2006	Catalina	CSS	·	5.0 km	MPC · JPL
431246	2006 TX_{64}	—	October 11, 2006	Palomar	NEAT	·	720 m	MPC · JPL
431247	2006 TM_{70}	—	September 19, 2006	Catalina	CSS	·	1.0 km	MPC · JPL
431248	2006 TK_{80}	—	October 4, 2006	Mount Lemmon	Mount Lemmon Survey	·	880 m	MPC · JPL
431249	2006 TH_{81}	—	October 13, 2006	Kitt Peak	Spacewatch	·	4.1 km	MPC · JPL
431250	2006 TM_{118}	—	October 3, 2006	Apache Point	A. C. Becker	·	3.2 km	MPC · JPL
431251	2006 TZ_{120}	—	October 12, 2006	Apache Point	A. C. Becker	·	2.9 km	MPC · JPL
431252	2006 TU_{123}	—	October 2, 2006	Mount Lemmon	Mount Lemmon Survey	NYS	680 m	MPC · JPL
431253	2006 UK_{2}	—	September 17, 2006	Kitt Peak	Spacewatch	NYS	660 m	MPC · JPL
431254	2006 UT_{4}	—	October 16, 2006	Kitt Peak	Spacewatch	·	2.8 km	MPC · JPL
431255	2006 UZ_{12}	—	October 17, 2006	Mount Lemmon	Mount Lemmon Survey	NYS	970 m	MPC · JPL
431256	2006 UD_{15}	—	October 17, 2006	Mount Lemmon	Mount Lemmon Survey	MAS	660 m	MPC · JPL
431257	2006 UQ_{19}	—	September 25, 2006	Kitt Peak	Spacewatch	·	3.2 km	MPC · JPL
431258	2006 UF_{23}	—	October 16, 2006	Kitt Peak	Spacewatch	·	3.6 km	MPC · JPL
431259	2006 UO_{23}	—	October 16, 2006	Kitt Peak	Spacewatch	·	3.4 km	MPC · JPL
431260	2006 UM_{34}	—	October 16, 2006	Kitt Peak	Spacewatch	·	750 m	MPC · JPL
431261	2006 UH_{37}	—	October 3, 2006	Mount Lemmon	Mount Lemmon Survey	·	860 m	MPC · JPL
431262	2006 UU_{37}	—	October 16, 2006	Kitt Peak	Spacewatch	MAS	640 m	MPC · JPL
431263	2006 UV_{44}	—	October 16, 2006	Kitt Peak	Spacewatch	·	4.9 km	MPC · JPL
431264	2006 UV_{48}	—	September 17, 2006	Catalina	CSS	·	3.3 km	MPC · JPL
431265	2006 UT_{58}	—	October 19, 2006	Mount Lemmon	Mount Lemmon Survey	·	2.7 km	MPC · JPL
431266	2006 UL_{68}	—	October 16, 2006	Kitt Peak	Spacewatch	·	2.5 km	MPC · JPL
431267	2006 UE_{76}	—	September 23, 2006	Kitt Peak	Spacewatch	·	2.9 km	MPC · JPL
431268	2006 UF_{77}	—	October 17, 2006	Kitt Peak	Spacewatch	·	3.9 km	MPC · JPL
431269	2006 UQ_{89}	—	September 25, 2006	Mount Lemmon	Mount Lemmon Survey	·	990 m	MPC · JPL
431270	2006 UX_{91}	—	September 30, 2006	Mount Lemmon	Mount Lemmon Survey	NYS	1.0 km	MPC · JPL
431271	2006 UX_{93}	—	October 18, 2006	Kitt Peak	Spacewatch	·	2.9 km	MPC · JPL
431272	2006 UZ_{93}	—	October 2, 2006	Mount Lemmon	Mount Lemmon Survey	·	3.6 km	MPC · JPL
431273	2006 UW_{99}	—	October 18, 2006	Kitt Peak	Spacewatch	·	920 m	MPC · JPL
431274	2006 UB_{105}	—	October 3, 2006	Mount Lemmon	Mount Lemmon Survey	·	730 m	MPC · JPL
431275	2006 UC_{115}	—	September 28, 2006	Kitt Peak	Spacewatch	·	2.8 km	MPC · JPL
431276	2006 UW_{115}	—	October 2, 2006	Kitt Peak	Spacewatch	VER	2.9 km	MPC · JPL
431277	2006 UT_{131}	—	October 19, 2006	Kitt Peak	Spacewatch	·	1.1 km	MPC · JPL
431278	2006 UG_{133}	—	October 19, 2006	Kitt Peak	Spacewatch	EOS	2.1 km	MPC · JPL
431279	2006 UA_{139}	—	October 19, 2006	Kitt Peak	Spacewatch	THB	4.4 km	MPC · JPL
431280	2006 UD_{170}	—	October 21, 2006	Mount Lemmon	Mount Lemmon Survey	·	880 m	MPC · JPL
431281	2006 UY_{170}	—	October 21, 2006	Mount Lemmon	Mount Lemmon Survey	·	5.2 km	MPC · JPL
431282	2006 UC_{177}	—	September 16, 2006	Anderson Mesa	LONEOS	·	3.4 km	MPC · JPL
431283	2006 UN_{194}	—	October 20, 2006	Kitt Peak	Spacewatch	·	2.6 km	MPC · JPL
431284	2006 UQ_{202}	—	October 22, 2006	Catalina	CSS	·	4.8 km	MPC · JPL
431285	2006 UR_{213}	—	October 23, 2006	Kitt Peak	Spacewatch	·	1.1 km	MPC · JPL
431286	2006 UF_{218}	—	October 27, 2006	Mount Nyukasa	Japan Aerospace Exploration Agency	·	3.6 km	MPC · JPL
431287	2006 UG_{218}	—	October 27, 2006	Mount Nyukasa	Japan Aerospace Exploration Agency	·	700 m	MPC · JPL
431288	2006 UQ_{226}	—	October 2, 2006	Mount Lemmon	Mount Lemmon Survey	·	670 m	MPC · JPL
431289	2006 UL_{268}	—	October 27, 2006	Mount Lemmon	Mount Lemmon Survey	·	760 m	MPC · JPL
431290	2006 UZ_{270}	—	October 27, 2006	Mount Lemmon	Mount Lemmon Survey	·	900 m	MPC · JPL
431291	2006 UU_{272}	—	October 4, 2006	Mount Lemmon	Mount Lemmon Survey	·	3.2 km	MPC · JPL
431292	2006 UY_{274}	—	September 25, 2006	Kitt Peak	Spacewatch	·	3.2 km	MPC · JPL
431293	2006 UL_{287}	—	October 20, 2006	Kitt Peak	Spacewatch	HYG	3.2 km	MPC · JPL
431294	2006 UV_{287}	—	October 29, 2006	Kitt Peak	Spacewatch	·	3.7 km	MPC · JPL
431295	2006 UO_{320}	—	September 27, 2006	Mount Lemmon	Mount Lemmon Survey	NYS	1.1 km	MPC · JPL
431296	2006 UO_{327}	—	October 23, 2006	Mount Lemmon	Mount Lemmon Survey	PHO	1.1 km	MPC · JPL
431297	2006 UC_{331}	—	October 16, 2006	Apache Point	A. C. Becker	·	3.2 km	MPC · JPL
431298	2006 UP_{337}	—	October 16, 2006	Kitt Peak	Spacewatch	·	2.3 km	MPC · JPL
431299	2006 UX_{337}	—	October 22, 2006	Catalina	CSS	·	3.9 km	MPC · JPL
431300	2006 UV_{345}	—	October 16, 2006	Kitt Peak	Spacewatch	·	870 m	MPC · JPL

== 431301–431400 ==
back to top

Designation			Discovery			Properties		Ref
Permanent	Provisional	Named after	Date	Site	Discoverer(s)	Category	Diam.	Ref
431301	2006 VX_{1}	—	November 7, 2006	Palomar	NEAT	PHO	840 m	MPC · JPL
431302	2006 VU_{19}	—	October 31, 2006	Mount Lemmon	Mount Lemmon Survey	·	3.0 km	MPC · JPL
431303	2006 VP_{56}	—	November 11, 2006	Kitt Peak	Spacewatch	NYS	850 m	MPC · JPL
431304	2006 VQ_{60}	—	November 11, 2006	Kitt Peak	Spacewatch	·	1.7 km	MPC · JPL
431305	2006 VN_{67}	—	November 11, 2006	Kitt Peak	Spacewatch	·	1.1 km	MPC · JPL
431306	2006 VG_{69}	—	November 11, 2006	Kitt Peak	Spacewatch	T_{j} (2.98)	4.1 km	MPC · JPL
431307	2006 VK_{78}	—	October 23, 2006	Mount Lemmon	Mount Lemmon Survey	·	770 m	MPC · JPL
431308	2006 VC_{80}	—	October 22, 2006	Mount Lemmon	Mount Lemmon Survey	·	930 m	MPC · JPL
431309	2006 VV_{86}	—	November 14, 2006	Mount Lemmon	Mount Lemmon Survey	·	920 m	MPC · JPL
431310	2006 VR_{116}	—	October 31, 2006	Mount Lemmon	Mount Lemmon Survey	·	3.1 km	MPC · JPL
431311	2006 VS_{132}	—	November 15, 2006	Kitt Peak	Spacewatch	·	1.1 km	MPC · JPL
431312	2006 VM_{150}	—	September 25, 2006	Mount Lemmon	Mount Lemmon Survey	·	3.3 km	MPC · JPL
431313	2006 VH_{152}	—	November 9, 2006	Palomar	NEAT	·	840 m	MPC · JPL
431314	2006 WX_{12}	—	November 16, 2006	Mount Lemmon	Mount Lemmon Survey	NYS	1.1 km	MPC · JPL
431315	2006 WQ_{55}	—	November 10, 2006	Kitt Peak	Spacewatch	·	5.1 km	MPC · JPL
431316	2006 WD_{56}	—	November 16, 2006	Kitt Peak	Spacewatch	MAS	700 m	MPC · JPL
431317	2006 WV_{57}	—	November 17, 2006	Kitt Peak	Spacewatch	·	750 m	MPC · JPL
431318	2006 WT_{91}	—	September 30, 2006	Mount Lemmon	Mount Lemmon Survey	NYS	900 m	MPC · JPL
431319	2006 WL_{103}	—	November 11, 2006	Mount Lemmon	Mount Lemmon Survey	·	1 km	MPC · JPL
431320	2006 WY_{113}	—	October 23, 2006	Mount Lemmon	Mount Lemmon Survey	·	4.5 km	MPC · JPL
431321	2006 WL_{130}	—	November 25, 2006	Kitt Peak	Spacewatch	·	2.2 km	MPC · JPL
431322	2006 WW_{132}	—	November 18, 2006	Kitt Peak	Spacewatch	CYB	3.3 km	MPC · JPL
431323	2006 WR_{134}	—	November 18, 2006	Mount Lemmon	Mount Lemmon Survey	·	1.1 km	MPC · JPL
431324	2006 WR_{139}	—	November 11, 2006	Kitt Peak	Spacewatch	MAS	700 m	MPC · JPL
431325	2006 WQ_{141}	—	November 20, 2006	Kitt Peak	Spacewatch	·	760 m	MPC · JPL
431326	2006 WH_{155}	—	November 22, 2006	Kitt Peak	Spacewatch	·	1.0 km	MPC · JPL
431327	2006 WP_{176}	—	November 23, 2006	Mount Lemmon	Mount Lemmon Survey	·	3.9 km	MPC · JPL
431328	2006 WM_{199}	—	October 31, 2006	Mount Lemmon	Mount Lemmon Survey	·	3.9 km	MPC · JPL
431329	2006 XN_{9}	—	December 9, 2006	Kitt Peak	Spacewatch	NYS	960 m	MPC · JPL
431330	2006 XG_{18}	—	December 10, 2006	Kitt Peak	Spacewatch	NYS	1.1 km	MPC · JPL
431331	2006 XH_{20}	—	December 1, 2006	Mount Lemmon	Mount Lemmon Survey	·	1.4 km	MPC · JPL
431332	2006 XR_{21}	—	November 10, 2006	Kitt Peak	Spacewatch	NYS	1.4 km	MPC · JPL
431333	2006 XM_{29}	—	November 22, 2006	Kitt Peak	Spacewatch	·	1.1 km	MPC · JPL
431334	2006 XL_{45}	—	November 25, 2006	Kitt Peak	Spacewatch	·	1.0 km	MPC · JPL
431335	2006 XR_{45}	—	September 27, 2006	Mount Lemmon	Mount Lemmon Survey	·	1.5 km	MPC · JPL
431336	2006 XH_{50}	—	December 13, 2006	Mount Lemmon	Mount Lemmon Survey	T_{j} (2.93)	6.3 km	MPC · JPL
431337	2006 XO_{55}	—	December 15, 2006	Kitt Peak	Spacewatch	·	970 m	MPC · JPL
431338	2006 XS_{55}	—	December 1, 2006	Mount Lemmon	Mount Lemmon Survey	MAS	700 m	MPC · JPL
431339	2006 XT_{59}	—	November 21, 2006	Mount Lemmon	Mount Lemmon Survey	·	1.0 km	MPC · JPL
431340	2006 YM_{7}	—	November 28, 2006	Socorro	LINEAR	·	1.0 km	MPC · JPL
431341	2006 YM_{55}	—	December 21, 2006	Kitt Peak	Spacewatch	·	1.1 km	MPC · JPL
431342	2007 AK	—	January 8, 2007	Mount Lemmon	Mount Lemmon Survey	·	2.1 km	MPC · JPL
431343	2007 AE_{22}	—	December 25, 1998	Kitt Peak	Spacewatch	·	1.4 km	MPC · JPL
431344	2007 BC_{56}	—	November 25, 2006	Mount Lemmon	Mount Lemmon Survey	·	1.2 km	MPC · JPL
431345	2007 BK_{62}	—	January 27, 2007	Catalina	CSS	H	690 m	MPC · JPL
431346	2007 BT_{72}	—	January 24, 2007	Mount Nyukasa	Japan Aerospace Exploration Agency	·	1.4 km	MPC · JPL
431347	2007 BA_{76}	—	January 28, 2007	Mount Lemmon	Mount Lemmon Survey	3:2 · SHU	4.9 km	MPC · JPL
431348	2007 BQ_{77}	—	January 25, 2007	Kitt Peak	Spacewatch	·	930 m	MPC · JPL
431349	2007 BU_{77}	—	January 28, 2007	Kitt Peak	Spacewatch	·	990 m	MPC · JPL
431350	2007 BA_{79}	—	January 27, 2007	Mount Lemmon	Mount Lemmon Survey	·	1.2 km	MPC · JPL
431351	2007 BF_{81}	—	January 27, 2007	Kitt Peak	Spacewatch	·	1.3 km	MPC · JPL
431352	2007 CQ_{1}	—	January 27, 2007	Kitt Peak	Spacewatch	H	390 m	MPC · JPL
431353	2007 CU_{10}	—	January 27, 2007	Mount Lemmon	Mount Lemmon Survey	·	940 m	MPC · JPL
431354	2007 CZ_{29}	—	February 6, 2007	Mount Lemmon	Mount Lemmon Survey	·	1.1 km	MPC · JPL
431355	2007 CF_{49}	—	February 10, 2007	Mount Lemmon	Mount Lemmon Survey	SYL · CYB	3.4 km	MPC · JPL
431356	2007 CY_{50}	—	February 8, 2007	Kitt Peak	Spacewatch	H	480 m	MPC · JPL
431357	2007 DL_{5}	—	January 28, 2007	Kitt Peak	Spacewatch	·	1.2 km	MPC · JPL
431358	2007 DX_{73}	—	February 21, 2007	Kitt Peak	Spacewatch	·	1.0 km	MPC · JPL
431359	2007 DT_{77}	—	February 22, 2007	Anderson Mesa	LONEOS	H	720 m	MPC · JPL
431360	2007 DE_{79}	—	February 23, 2007	Kitt Peak	Spacewatch	·	1.8 km	MPC · JPL
431361	2007 DJ_{82}	—	February 23, 2007	Kitt Peak	Spacewatch	3:2	4.4 km	MPC · JPL
431362	2007 DQ_{83}	—	January 28, 2007	Mount Lemmon	Mount Lemmon Survey	H	520 m	MPC · JPL
431363	2007 DU_{85}	—	January 27, 2007	Mount Lemmon	Mount Lemmon Survey	·	1.0 km	MPC · JPL
431364	2007 DV_{88}	—	February 23, 2007	Kitt Peak	Spacewatch	·	1.2 km	MPC · JPL
431365	2007 DR_{94}	—	February 23, 2007	Kitt Peak	Spacewatch	·	1.2 km	MPC · JPL
431366	2007 DP_{98}	—	February 25, 2007	Mount Lemmon	Mount Lemmon Survey	NYS	1.1 km	MPC · JPL
431367	2007 DS_{102}	—	February 25, 2007	Mount Lemmon	Mount Lemmon Survey	H	650 m	MPC · JPL
431368	2007 DN_{103}	—	February 21, 2007	Kitt Peak	M. W. Buie	3:2	3.9 km	MPC · JPL
431369	2007 DN_{111}	—	November 1, 2005	Mount Lemmon	Mount Lemmon Survey	T_{j} (2.99) · 3:2	3.6 km	MPC · JPL
431370	2007 ES_{1}	—	March 9, 2007	Kitt Peak	Spacewatch	·	1.1 km	MPC · JPL
431371	2007 EH_{17}	—	February 23, 2007	Mount Lemmon	Mount Lemmon Survey	MAR	1.2 km	MPC · JPL
431372	2007 ES_{22}	—	February 23, 2007	Mount Lemmon	Mount Lemmon Survey	·	1.4 km	MPC · JPL
431373	2007 ES_{64}	—	March 10, 2007	Kitt Peak	Spacewatch	·	1.1 km	MPC · JPL
431374	2007 EN_{67}	—	September 8, 2004	Socorro	LINEAR	·	1.9 km	MPC · JPL
431375	2007 EN_{77}	—	March 10, 2007	Mount Lemmon	Mount Lemmon Survey	PHO	880 m	MPC · JPL
431376	2007 EX_{96}	—	March 10, 2007	Mount Lemmon	Mount Lemmon Survey	·	1.8 km	MPC · JPL
431377	2007 EF_{101}	—	March 11, 2007	Kitt Peak	Spacewatch	·	940 m	MPC · JPL
431378	2007 EP_{110}	—	March 11, 2007	Kitt Peak	Spacewatch	·	1.3 km	MPC · JPL
431379	2007 EQ_{120}	—	March 14, 2007	Anderson Mesa	LONEOS	·	1.2 km	MPC · JPL
431380	2007 EN_{136}	—	February 21, 2007	Kitt Peak	Spacewatch	·	980 m	MPC · JPL
431381	2007 ER_{136}	—	March 10, 2007	Kitt Peak	Spacewatch	·	1.4 km	MPC · JPL
431382	2007 EL_{152}	—	March 12, 2007	Mount Lemmon	Mount Lemmon Survey	V	650 m	MPC · JPL
431383	2007 EB_{170}	—	March 14, 2007	Socorro	LINEAR	·	990 m	MPC · JPL
431384	2007 ET_{177}	—	March 14, 2007	Kitt Peak	Spacewatch	·	1.6 km	MPC · JPL
431385	2007 EG_{193}	—	March 14, 2007	Mount Lemmon	Mount Lemmon Survey	·	1.0 km	MPC · JPL
431386	2007 EK_{197}	—	March 15, 2007	Kitt Peak	Spacewatch	·	920 m	MPC · JPL
431387	2007 EM_{198}	—	March 12, 2007	Kitt Peak	Spacewatch	H	630 m	MPC · JPL
431388	2007 EW_{198}	—	March 10, 2007	Catalina	CSS	H	610 m	MPC · JPL
431389	2007 EE_{199}	—	March 10, 2007	Catalina	CSS	H	670 m	MPC · JPL
431390	2007 EM_{201}	—	March 12, 2007	Catalina	CSS	H	710 m	MPC · JPL
431391	2007 EQ_{215}	—	December 16, 2006	Mount Lemmon	Mount Lemmon Survey	H	600 m	MPC · JPL
431392	2007 FJ_{8}	—	March 16, 2007	Mount Lemmon	Mount Lemmon Survey	(5)	1.5 km	MPC · JPL
431393	2007 FX_{21}	—	March 10, 2007	Mount Lemmon	Mount Lemmon Survey	PHO	850 m	MPC · JPL
431394	2007 FS_{35}	—	March 20, 2007	Kitt Peak	Spacewatch	AMO	440 m	MPC · JPL
431395	2007 FG_{37}	—	March 26, 2007	Mount Lemmon	Mount Lemmon Survey	·	2.0 km	MPC · JPL
431396	2007 FG_{47}	—	March 20, 2007	Catalina	CSS	H	590 m	MPC · JPL
431397 Carolinregina	2007 GD_{6}	Carolinregina	April 14, 2007	Heidelberg	F. Hormuth	ADE	1.7 km	MPC · JPL
431398	2007 GR_{17}	—	April 11, 2007	Kitt Peak	Spacewatch	·	880 m	MPC · JPL
431399	2007 GJ_{21}	—	February 26, 2007	Mount Lemmon	Mount Lemmon Survey	·	980 m	MPC · JPL
431400	2007 GR_{33}	—	April 11, 2007	Mount Lemmon	Mount Lemmon Survey	(5)	1.1 km	MPC · JPL

== 431401–431500 ==
back to top

Designation			Discovery			Properties		Ref
Permanent	Provisional	Named after	Date	Site	Discoverer(s)	Category	Diam.	Ref
431401	2007 GX_{38}	—	March 26, 2007	Mount Lemmon	Mount Lemmon Survey	KON	1.7 km	MPC · JPL
431402	2007 GD_{40}	—	April 14, 2007	Kitt Peak	Spacewatch	·	1.3 km	MPC · JPL
431403	2007 GU_{41}	—	April 14, 2007	Kitt Peak	Spacewatch	·	1.1 km	MPC · JPL
431404	2007 GL_{42}	—	April 14, 2007	Kitt Peak	Spacewatch	·	1.5 km	MPC · JPL
431405	2007 GQ_{46}	—	April 14, 2007	Kitt Peak	Spacewatch	·	2.0 km	MPC · JPL
431406	2007 GP_{51}	—	April 13, 2007	Črni Vrh	B. Dintinjana, H. Mikuž	·	2.1 km	MPC · JPL
431407	2007 GO_{61}	—	April 15, 2007	Kitt Peak	Spacewatch	·	1.9 km	MPC · JPL
431408	2007 GM_{65}	—	April 15, 2007	Kitt Peak	Spacewatch	·	1.1 km	MPC · JPL
431409	2007 GC_{67}	—	April 15, 2007	Kitt Peak	Spacewatch	·	1.4 km	MPC · JPL
431410	2007 HX_{27}	—	April 18, 2007	Kitt Peak	Spacewatch	·	890 m	MPC · JPL
431411	2007 HD_{53}	—	April 20, 2007	Kitt Peak	Spacewatch	·	1.2 km	MPC · JPL
431412	2007 HV_{69}	—	April 24, 2007	Kitt Peak	Spacewatch	·	1.1 km	MPC · JPL
431413	2007 HG_{76}	—	March 14, 2007	Mount Lemmon	Mount Lemmon Survey	·	1.4 km	MPC · JPL
431414	2007 HL_{83}	—	April 23, 2007	Kitt Peak	Spacewatch	·	1.7 km	MPC · JPL
431415	2007 HM_{87}	—	April 24, 2007	Kitt Peak	Spacewatch	·	1.1 km	MPC · JPL
431416	2007 HS_{87}	—	April 25, 2007	Kitt Peak	Spacewatch	EUN	1.1 km	MPC · JPL
431417	2007 HB_{90}	—	April 18, 2007	Catalina	CSS	·	1.5 km	MPC · JPL
431418	2007 HZ_{97}	—	April 25, 2007	Mount Lemmon	Mount Lemmon Survey	·	1.7 km	MPC · JPL
431419	2007 JF_{15}	—	April 18, 2007	Kitt Peak	Spacewatch	EUN	1.0 km	MPC · JPL
431420	2007 JV_{25}	—	January 30, 2006	Kitt Peak	Spacewatch	·	1.5 km	MPC · JPL
431421	2007 JE_{41}	—	April 25, 2007	Kitt Peak	Spacewatch	·	1.3 km	MPC · JPL
431422	2007 LM_{2}	—	June 8, 2007	Kitt Peak	Spacewatch	·	1.7 km	MPC · JPL
431423	2007 LY_{5}	—	June 8, 2007	Kitt Peak	Spacewatch	·	1.7 km	MPC · JPL
431424	2007 LU_{9}	—	June 8, 2007	Kitt Peak	Spacewatch	MAR	1.2 km	MPC · JPL
431425	2007 LL_{15}	—	May 12, 2007	Mount Lemmon	Mount Lemmon Survey	EUN	1.6 km	MPC · JPL
431426	2007 LE_{17}	—	May 7, 2007	Kitt Peak	Spacewatch	·	1.9 km	MPC · JPL
431427	2007 LS_{17}	—	May 9, 2007	Kitt Peak	Spacewatch	·	1.8 km	MPC · JPL
431428	2007 LF_{34}	—	June 8, 2007	Kitt Peak	Spacewatch	·	1.9 km	MPC · JPL
431429	2007 MZ_{4}	—	May 11, 2007	Mount Lemmon	Mount Lemmon Survey	·	1.6 km	MPC · JPL
431430	2007 MV_{10}	—	June 21, 2007	Mount Lemmon	Mount Lemmon Survey	·	1.7 km	MPC · JPL
431431	2007 MB_{22}	—	June 14, 2007	Kitt Peak	Spacewatch	·	2.2 km	MPC · JPL
431432	2007 OV_{5}	—	July 22, 2007	Lulin	LUSS	·	2.6 km	MPC · JPL
431433	2007 PT_{23}	—	August 12, 2007	Socorro	LINEAR	JUN	1.1 km	MPC · JPL
431434	2007 PZ_{24}	—	August 12, 2007	Socorro	LINEAR	·	1.6 km	MPC · JPL
431435	2007 PE_{26}	—	August 11, 2007	Socorro	LINEAR	·	2.3 km	MPC · JPL
431436 Gahberg	2007 QJ_{3}	Gahberg	August 18, 2007	Gaisberg	Gierlinger, R.	·	1.7 km	MPC · JPL
431437	2007 QP_{7}	—	August 21, 2007	Anderson Mesa	LONEOS	·	2.5 km	MPC · JPL
431438	2007 RV	—	September 3, 2007	Eskridge	G. Hug	EOS	1.8 km	MPC · JPL
431439	2007 RP_{23}	—	August 23, 2007	Kitt Peak	Spacewatch	JUN	1.6 km	MPC · JPL
431440	2007 RN_{29}	—	September 4, 2007	Catalina	CSS	·	2.8 km	MPC · JPL
431441	2007 RE_{48}	—	September 9, 2007	Mount Lemmon	Mount Lemmon Survey	EOS	1.9 km	MPC · JPL
431442	2007 RX_{49}	—	September 9, 2007	Mount Lemmon	Mount Lemmon Survey	·	2.1 km	MPC · JPL
431443	2007 RU_{51}	—	September 9, 2007	Kitt Peak	Spacewatch	EOS	1.9 km	MPC · JPL
431444	2007 RL_{82}	—	September 10, 2007	Mount Lemmon	Mount Lemmon Survey	·	1.8 km	MPC · JPL
431445	2007 RR_{129}	—	March 14, 2004	Kitt Peak	Spacewatch	·	2.9 km	MPC · JPL
431446	2007 RD_{135}	—	September 12, 2007	Mount Lemmon	Mount Lemmon Survey	EOS	2.1 km	MPC · JPL
431447	2007 RE_{140}	—	September 14, 2007	Mount Lemmon	Mount Lemmon Survey	·	2.0 km	MPC · JPL
431448	2007 RK_{141}	—	September 13, 2007	Socorro	LINEAR	·	2.9 km	MPC · JPL
431449	2007 RW_{162}	—	April 8, 2006	Kitt Peak	Spacewatch	·	1.8 km	MPC · JPL
431450	2007 RF_{174}	—	September 10, 2007	Kitt Peak	Spacewatch	·	2.3 km	MPC · JPL
431451	2007 RF_{176}	—	September 9, 2007	Mount Lemmon	Mount Lemmon Survey	KOR	1.3 km	MPC · JPL
431452	2007 RH_{201}	—	September 13, 2007	Kitt Peak	Spacewatch	·	2.6 km	MPC · JPL
431453	2007 RL_{201}	—	September 13, 2007	Kitt Peak	Spacewatch	·	2.7 km	MPC · JPL
431454	2007 RB_{203}	—	September 13, 2007	Kitt Peak	Spacewatch	·	2.0 km	MPC · JPL
431455	2007 RG_{209}	—	September 10, 2007	Kitt Peak	Spacewatch	·	1.9 km	MPC · JPL
431456	2007 RX_{232}	—	September 12, 2007	Dauban	Chante-Perdrix	·	720 m	MPC · JPL
431457	2007 RT_{266}	—	September 15, 2007	Mount Lemmon	Mount Lemmon Survey	·	1.7 km	MPC · JPL
431458	2007 RG_{274}	—	August 23, 2007	Kitt Peak	Spacewatch	·	3.4 km	MPC · JPL
431459	2007 RV_{279}	—	September 9, 2007	Anderson Mesa	LONEOS	BRA	1.9 km	MPC · JPL
431460	2007 RA_{281}	—	September 13, 2007	Catalina	CSS	TIR	2.5 km	MPC · JPL
431461	2007 RU_{284}	—	September 12, 2007	Mount Lemmon	Mount Lemmon Survey	·	1.8 km	MPC · JPL
431462	2007 RH_{287}	—	September 9, 2007	Mount Lemmon	Mount Lemmon Survey	·	2.0 km	MPC · JPL
431463	2007 RZ_{287}	—	September 10, 2007	Kitt Peak	Spacewatch	EOS	1.4 km	MPC · JPL
431464	2007 RU_{288}	—	September 14, 2007	Mount Lemmon	Mount Lemmon Survey	·	3.5 km	MPC · JPL
431465	2007 RV_{289}	—	September 14, 2007	Catalina	CSS	·	3.7 km	MPC · JPL
431466	2007 RY_{297}	—	September 5, 2007	Catalina	CSS	·	2.2 km	MPC · JPL
431467	2007 RW_{301}	—	September 14, 2007	Mount Lemmon	Mount Lemmon Survey	·	2.0 km	MPC · JPL
431468	2007 RY_{313}	—	September 13, 2007	Mount Lemmon	Mount Lemmon Survey	·	2.8 km	MPC · JPL
431469	2007 RE_{316}	—	September 4, 2007	Catalina	CSS	·	2.8 km	MPC · JPL
431470	2007 RE_{319}	—	September 12, 2007	Catalina	CSS	·	2.2 km	MPC · JPL
431471	2007 RL_{319}	—	September 12, 2007	Mount Lemmon	Mount Lemmon Survey	·	1.8 km	MPC · JPL
431472	2007 RH_{321}	—	September 13, 2007	Anderson Mesa	LONEOS	·	2.4 km	MPC · JPL
431473	2007 SO_{2}	—	September 20, 2007	Farra d'Isonzo	Farra d'Isonzo	·	3.0 km	MPC · JPL
431474	2007 SE_{13}	—	September 9, 2007	Kitt Peak	Spacewatch	·	2.0 km	MPC · JPL
431475	2007 SD_{21}	—	September 18, 2007	Catalina	CSS	·	2.1 km	MPC · JPL
431476	2007 TY_{1}	—	March 26, 2006	Mount Lemmon	Mount Lemmon Survey	·	1.8 km	MPC · JPL
431477	2007 TT_{8}	—	October 6, 2007	Bergisch Gladbach	W. Bickel	EOS	1.7 km	MPC · JPL
431478	2007 TG_{21}	—	October 9, 2007	Dauban	Chante-Perdrix	·	2.7 km	MPC · JPL
431479	2007 TJ_{25}	—	September 24, 2007	Kitt Peak	Spacewatch	·	2.4 km	MPC · JPL
431480	2007 TZ_{25}	—	October 4, 2007	Kitt Peak	Spacewatch	·	2.5 km	MPC · JPL
431481	2007 TP_{28}	—	October 4, 2007	Kitt Peak	Spacewatch	EOS	1.9 km	MPC · JPL
431482	2007 TK_{29}	—	October 4, 2007	Kitt Peak	Spacewatch	EOS	1.6 km	MPC · JPL
431483	2007 TO_{40}	—	October 6, 2007	Kitt Peak	Spacewatch	·	3.4 km	MPC · JPL
431484	2007 TU_{40}	—	October 6, 2007	Kitt Peak	Spacewatch	·	2.2 km	MPC · JPL
431485	2007 TM_{45}	—	October 7, 2007	Mount Lemmon	Mount Lemmon Survey	·	810 m	MPC · JPL
431486	2007 TD_{48}	—	October 4, 2007	Kitt Peak	Spacewatch	·	2.6 km	MPC · JPL
431487	2007 TT_{51}	—	October 4, 2007	Kitt Peak	Spacewatch	EOS	1.8 km	MPC · JPL
431488	2007 TP_{55}	—	October 4, 2007	Kitt Peak	Spacewatch	EOS	2.1 km	MPC · JPL
431489	2007 TN_{58}	—	April 7, 2005	Kitt Peak	Spacewatch	·	2.8 km	MPC · JPL
431490	2007 TR_{61}	—	October 7, 2007	Mount Lemmon	Mount Lemmon Survey	·	2.3 km	MPC · JPL
431491	2007 TV_{63}	—	October 7, 2007	Mount Lemmon	Mount Lemmon Survey	·	2.5 km	MPC · JPL
431492	2007 TQ_{70}	—	October 12, 2007	Goodricke-Pigott	R. A. Tucker	·	3.6 km	MPC · JPL
431493	2007 TW_{71}	—	January 15, 2004	Kitt Peak	Spacewatch	EOS	2.2 km	MPC · JPL
431494	2007 TF_{78}	—	October 5, 2007	Kitt Peak	Spacewatch	·	2.8 km	MPC · JPL
431495	2007 TQ_{84}	—	October 8, 2007	Kitt Peak	Spacewatch	AGN	1.3 km	MPC · JPL
431496	2007 TX_{91}	—	October 4, 2007	Catalina	CSS	·	2.2 km	MPC · JPL
431497	2007 TH_{95}	—	October 7, 2007	Catalina	CSS	·	3.6 km	MPC · JPL
431498	2007 TH_{98}	—	October 8, 2007	Mount Lemmon	Mount Lemmon Survey	·	2.8 km	MPC · JPL
431499	2007 TO_{112}	—	October 8, 2007	Mount Lemmon	Mount Lemmon Survey	·	1.6 km	MPC · JPL
431500	2007 TQ_{113}	—	October 8, 2007	Anderson Mesa	LONEOS	·	3.3 km	MPC · JPL

== 431501–431600 ==
back to top

Designation			Discovery			Properties		Ref
Permanent	Provisional	Named after	Date	Site	Discoverer(s)	Category	Diam.	Ref
431501	2007 TU_{123}	—	October 6, 2007	Kitt Peak	Spacewatch	·	2.4 km	MPC · JPL
431502	2007 TE_{126}	—	October 6, 2007	Kitt Peak	Spacewatch	·	2.3 km	MPC · JPL
431503	2007 TQ_{136}	—	October 8, 2007	Catalina	CSS	·	3.2 km	MPC · JPL
431504	2007 TT_{136}	—	September 13, 2007	Catalina	CSS	EUN	1.6 km	MPC · JPL
431505	2007 TR_{145}	—	September 15, 2007	Mount Lemmon	Mount Lemmon Survey	·	3.7 km	MPC · JPL
431506	2007 TW_{162}	—	October 11, 2007	Socorro	LINEAR	·	2.4 km	MPC · JPL
431507	2007 TB_{166}	—	October 10, 2007	Catalina	CSS	·	3.5 km	MPC · JPL
431508	2007 TD_{173}	—	October 4, 2007	Kitt Peak	Spacewatch	AGN	1.3 km	MPC · JPL
431509	2007 TD_{177}	—	October 6, 2007	Kitt Peak	Spacewatch	·	2.0 km	MPC · JPL
431510	2007 TR_{179}	—	October 7, 2007	Mount Lemmon	Mount Lemmon Survey	THM	1.9 km	MPC · JPL
431511	2007 TU_{179}	—	October 7, 2007	Mount Lemmon	Mount Lemmon Survey	·	2.6 km	MPC · JPL
431512	2007 TQ_{183}	—	October 9, 2007	Mount Lemmon	Mount Lemmon Survey	·	780 m	MPC · JPL
431513	2007 TU_{185}	—	October 11, 2007	Catalina	CSS	·	2.9 km	MPC · JPL
431514	2007 TA_{187}	—	October 13, 2007	Socorro	LINEAR	T_{j} (2.99)	3.7 km	MPC · JPL
431515	2007 TC_{187}	—	October 13, 2007	Socorro	LINEAR	·	2.4 km	MPC · JPL
431516	2007 TB_{188}	—	October 11, 2007	Kitt Peak	Spacewatch	·	3.2 km	MPC · JPL
431517	2007 TN_{192}	—	October 5, 2007	Kitt Peak	Spacewatch	EOS	2.1 km	MPC · JPL
431518	2007 TL_{196}	—	October 7, 2007	Mount Lemmon	Mount Lemmon Survey	·	630 m	MPC · JPL
431519	2007 TE_{199}	—	October 8, 2007	Kitt Peak	Spacewatch	HYG	2.3 km	MPC · JPL
431520	2007 TQ_{212}	—	October 7, 2007	Kitt Peak	Spacewatch	·	2.8 km	MPC · JPL
431521	2007 TD_{215}	—	October 7, 2007	Kitt Peak	Spacewatch	·	3.7 km	MPC · JPL
431522	2007 TL_{228}	—	October 8, 2007	Kitt Peak	Spacewatch	·	1.5 km	MPC · JPL
431523	2007 TM_{228}	—	October 8, 2007	Kitt Peak	Spacewatch	·	3.0 km	MPC · JPL
431524	2007 TV_{254}	—	October 9, 2007	Kitt Peak	Spacewatch	(1298)	2.5 km	MPC · JPL
431525	2007 TZ_{256}	—	October 10, 2007	Kitt Peak	Spacewatch	·	2.2 km	MPC · JPL
431526	2007 TR_{268}	—	October 9, 2007	Kitt Peak	Spacewatch	·	650 m	MPC · JPL
431527	2007 TX_{268}	—	October 9, 2007	Kitt Peak	Spacewatch	HYG	2.7 km	MPC · JPL
431528	2007 TP_{270}	—	October 9, 2007	Kitt Peak	Spacewatch	·	2.9 km	MPC · JPL
431529	2007 TC_{287}	—	October 4, 2007	Catalina	CSS	·	2.5 km	MPC · JPL
431530	2007 TY_{299}	—	October 4, 2007	Kitt Peak	Spacewatch	THM	2.2 km	MPC · JPL
431531	2007 TB_{307}	—	October 8, 2007	Mount Lemmon	Mount Lemmon Survey	HYG	2.3 km	MPC · JPL
431532	2007 TE_{317}	—	September 15, 2007	Mount Lemmon	Mount Lemmon Survey	·	1.9 km	MPC · JPL
431533	2007 TN_{323}	—	September 25, 2007	Mount Lemmon	Mount Lemmon Survey	·	3.4 km	MPC · JPL
431534	2007 TJ_{343}	—	October 10, 2007	Mount Lemmon	Mount Lemmon Survey	·	5.4 km	MPC · JPL
431535	2007 TJ_{344}	—	October 10, 2007	Mount Lemmon	Mount Lemmon Survey	·	3.8 km	MPC · JPL
431536	2007 TZ_{369}	—	October 12, 2007	Catalina	CSS	·	3.6 km	MPC · JPL
431537	2007 TF_{381}	—	October 6, 2007	Kitt Peak	Spacewatch	·	2.3 km	MPC · JPL
431538	2007 TK_{381}	—	October 14, 2007	Kitt Peak	Spacewatch	·	3.2 km	MPC · JPL
431539	2007 TP_{381}	—	September 15, 2007	Mount Lemmon	Mount Lemmon Survey	EOS	1.8 km	MPC · JPL
431540	2007 TF_{383}	—	October 14, 2007	Kitt Peak	Spacewatch	·	4.1 km	MPC · JPL
431541	2007 TN_{399}	—	October 15, 2007	Kitt Peak	Spacewatch	EOS	1.7 km	MPC · JPL
431542	2007 TL_{405}	—	October 15, 2007	Kitt Peak	Spacewatch	EOS	2.2 km	MPC · JPL
431543	2007 TS_{427}	—	October 10, 2007	Kitt Peak	Spacewatch	·	2.5 km	MPC · JPL
431544	2007 TY_{431}	—	October 7, 2007	Catalina	CSS	·	2.9 km	MPC · JPL
431545	2007 TF_{433}	—	October 8, 2007	Mount Lemmon	Mount Lemmon Survey	·	2.4 km	MPC · JPL
431546	2007 TK_{433}	—	October 10, 2007	Catalina	CSS	·	3.7 km	MPC · JPL
431547	2007 TD_{435}	—	October 10, 2007	Catalina	CSS	·	2.7 km	MPC · JPL
431548	2007 TU_{440}	—	October 8, 2007	Catalina	CSS	·	2.7 km	MPC · JPL
431549	2007 TD_{442}	—	October 10, 2007	Catalina	CSS	·	3.2 km	MPC · JPL
431550	2007 TQ_{442}	—	October 9, 2007	Catalina	CSS	TIR	2.5 km	MPC · JPL
431551	2007 TR_{444}	—	October 9, 2007	Kitt Peak	Spacewatch	EOS	2.3 km	MPC · JPL
431552	2007 TS_{444}	—	October 9, 2007	Kitt Peak	Spacewatch	·	1.2 km	MPC · JPL
431553	2007 TC_{445}	—	October 12, 2007	Catalina	CSS	·	3.3 km	MPC · JPL
431554	2007 TT_{446}	—	October 10, 2007	Catalina	CSS	·	2.6 km	MPC · JPL
431555	2007 TU_{448}	—	October 9, 2007	Kitt Peak	Spacewatch	·	2.9 km	MPC · JPL
431556	2007 TN_{449}	—	October 10, 2007	Kitt Peak	Spacewatch	KOR	1.3 km	MPC · JPL
431557	2007 TC_{450}	—	October 10, 2007	Mount Lemmon	Mount Lemmon Survey	·	2.4 km	MPC · JPL
431558	2007 UW_{13}	—	October 16, 2007	Mount Lemmon	Mount Lemmon Survey	·	2.6 km	MPC · JPL
431559	2007 UP_{38}	—	October 20, 2007	Mount Lemmon	Mount Lemmon Survey	·	2.2 km	MPC · JPL
431560	2007 UK_{39}	—	October 20, 2007	Catalina	CSS	·	3.0 km	MPC · JPL
431561	2007 UD_{42}	—	October 7, 2007	Kitt Peak	Spacewatch	·	2.4 km	MPC · JPL
431562	2007 UR_{42}	—	September 25, 2007	Mount Lemmon	Mount Lemmon Survey	EOS	1.9 km	MPC · JPL
431563	2007 UF_{45}	—	October 18, 2007	Mount Lemmon	Mount Lemmon Survey	·	1.8 km	MPC · JPL
431564	2007 UV_{83}	—	October 11, 2007	Kitt Peak	Spacewatch	·	3.4 km	MPC · JPL
431565	2007 UE_{92}	—	October 31, 2007	Mount Lemmon	Mount Lemmon Survey	·	2.6 km	MPC · JPL
431566	2007 UZ_{102}	—	October 30, 2007	Mount Lemmon	Mount Lemmon Survey	·	2.9 km	MPC · JPL
431567	2007 UC_{103}	—	September 18, 2007	Mount Lemmon	Mount Lemmon Survey	·	2.5 km	MPC · JPL
431568	2007 UO_{105}	—	October 30, 2007	Kitt Peak	Spacewatch	·	610 m	MPC · JPL
431569	2007 UO_{111}	—	October 30, 2007	Mount Lemmon	Mount Lemmon Survey	·	4.4 km	MPC · JPL
431570	2007 UU_{115}	—	October 31, 2007	Kitt Peak	Spacewatch	·	2.1 km	MPC · JPL
431571	2007 UR_{126}	—	October 16, 2007	Mount Lemmon	Mount Lemmon Survey	·	500 m	MPC · JPL
431572	2007 UZ_{126}	—	October 20, 2007	Mount Lemmon	Mount Lemmon Survey	·	3.4 km	MPC · JPL
431573	2007 UF_{128}	—	October 20, 2007	Kitt Peak	Spacewatch	·	3.1 km	MPC · JPL
431574	2007 VQ_{2}	—	November 1, 2007	Kitt Peak	Spacewatch	·	2.7 km	MPC · JPL
431575	2007 VV_{4}	—	November 4, 2007	La Sagra	OAM	PHO	900 m	MPC · JPL
431576	2007 VH_{24}	—	November 2, 2007	Mount Lemmon	Mount Lemmon Survey	·	3.4 km	MPC · JPL
431577	2007 VH_{26}	—	November 2, 2007	Mount Lemmon	Mount Lemmon Survey	·	2.9 km	MPC · JPL
431578	2007 VW_{32}	—	November 2, 2007	Kitt Peak	Spacewatch	·	2.3 km	MPC · JPL
431579	2007 VX_{35}	—	November 2, 2007	Kitt Peak	Spacewatch	·	3.3 km	MPC · JPL
431580	2007 VE_{44}	—	November 1, 2007	Kitt Peak	Spacewatch	·	3.3 km	MPC · JPL
431581	2007 VA_{56}	—	November 1, 2007	Kitt Peak	Spacewatch	VER	2.5 km	MPC · JPL
431582	2007 VD_{56}	—	November 1, 2007	Kitt Peak	Spacewatch	·	3.3 km	MPC · JPL
431583	2007 VO_{72}	—	November 1, 2007	Kitt Peak	Spacewatch	·	3.2 km	MPC · JPL
431584	2007 VV_{97}	—	November 1, 2007	Kitt Peak	Spacewatch	·	3.4 km	MPC · JPL
431585	2007 VQ_{98}	—	November 2, 2007	Kitt Peak	Spacewatch	·	2.8 km	MPC · JPL
431586	2007 VM_{103}	—	October 10, 2007	Catalina	CSS	·	2.2 km	MPC · JPL
431587	2007 VX_{106}	—	November 3, 2007	Kitt Peak	Spacewatch	·	2.3 km	MPC · JPL
431588	2007 VO_{108}	—	October 10, 2007	Mount Lemmon	Mount Lemmon Survey	·	2.0 km	MPC · JPL
431589	2007 VJ_{114}	—	October 20, 2007	Mount Lemmon	Mount Lemmon Survey	·	2.1 km	MPC · JPL
431590	2007 VT_{120}	—	November 5, 2007	Kitt Peak	Spacewatch	·	1.9 km	MPC · JPL
431591	2007 VC_{124}	—	October 6, 2007	Kitt Peak	Spacewatch	EOS	2.2 km	MPC · JPL
431592	2007 VS_{160}	—	November 5, 2007	Kitt Peak	Spacewatch	·	2.3 km	MPC · JPL
431593	2007 VU_{160}	—	November 5, 2007	Kitt Peak	Spacewatch	VER	3.1 km	MPC · JPL
431594	2007 VO_{166}	—	November 5, 2007	Kitt Peak	Spacewatch	·	3.5 km	MPC · JPL
431595	2007 VA_{172}	—	November 7, 2007	Kitt Peak	Spacewatch	EOS	2.5 km	MPC · JPL
431596	2007 VA_{183}	—	November 8, 2007	Catalina	CSS	·	2.8 km	MPC · JPL
431597	2007 VX_{183}	—	October 14, 2007	Mount Lemmon	Mount Lemmon Survey	·	780 m	MPC · JPL
431598	2007 VO_{188}	—	November 9, 2007	Bisei SG Center	BATTeRS	·	2.6 km	MPC · JPL
431599	2007 VV_{189}	—	November 14, 2007	La Sagra	OAM	URS	5.1 km	MPC · JPL
431600	2007 VM_{190}	—	November 4, 2007	Kitt Peak	Spacewatch	EOS	1.9 km	MPC · JPL

== 431601–431700 ==
back to top

Designation			Discovery			Properties		Ref
Permanent	Provisional	Named after	Date	Site	Discoverer(s)	Category	Diam.	Ref
431601	2007 VJ_{202}	—	November 6, 2007	Kitt Peak	Spacewatch	·	2.8 km	MPC · JPL
431602	2007 VK_{211}	—	November 9, 2007	Kitt Peak	Spacewatch	·	2.9 km	MPC · JPL
431603	2007 VN_{213}	—	November 9, 2007	Kitt Peak	Spacewatch	·	2.3 km	MPC · JPL
431604	2007 VW_{215}	—	November 9, 2007	Kitt Peak	Spacewatch	·	3.4 km	MPC · JPL
431605	2007 VS_{232}	—	November 7, 2007	Kitt Peak	Spacewatch	EOS	2.2 km	MPC · JPL
431606	2007 VL_{233}	—	November 8, 2007	Kitt Peak	Spacewatch	·	3.0 km	MPC · JPL
431607	2007 VN_{238}	—	November 13, 2007	Kitt Peak	Spacewatch	·	510 m	MPC · JPL
431608	2007 VS_{247}	—	November 13, 2007	Mount Lemmon	Mount Lemmon Survey	·	2.5 km	MPC · JPL
431609	2007 VB_{248}	—	November 13, 2007	Mount Lemmon	Mount Lemmon Survey	EOS	1.9 km	MPC · JPL
431610	2007 VX_{248}	—	March 10, 2005	Kitt Peak	Spacewatch	·	2.3 km	MPC · JPL
431611	2007 VF_{254}	—	October 10, 2007	Kitt Peak	Spacewatch	·	2.5 km	MPC · JPL
431612	2007 VE_{255}	—	October 20, 2007	Mount Lemmon	Mount Lemmon Survey	BRA	1.3 km	MPC · JPL
431613	2007 VX_{273}	—	November 12, 2007	Catalina	CSS	·	3.5 km	MPC · JPL
431614	2007 VO_{276}	—	November 4, 2007	Kitt Peak	Spacewatch	EOS	2.1 km	MPC · JPL
431615	2007 VU_{279}	—	October 30, 2007	Kitt Peak	Spacewatch	·	3.4 km	MPC · JPL
431616	2007 VR_{291}	—	November 14, 2007	Kitt Peak	Spacewatch	·	3.0 km	MPC · JPL
431617	2007 VX_{307}	—	November 5, 2007	Kitt Peak	Spacewatch	·	540 m	MPC · JPL
431618	2007 VT_{309}	—	November 3, 2007	Mount Lemmon	Mount Lemmon Survey	·	800 m	MPC · JPL
431619	2007 VB_{310}	—	November 5, 2007	Kitt Peak	Spacewatch	·	2.3 km	MPC · JPL
431620	2007 VS_{318}	—	November 9, 2007	Mount Lemmon	Mount Lemmon Survey	·	1.9 km	MPC · JPL
431621	2007 VT_{318}	—	November 12, 2007	Mount Lemmon	Mount Lemmon Survey	·	2.5 km	MPC · JPL
431622	2007 VV_{321}	—	November 8, 2007	Catalina	CSS	·	3.5 km	MPC · JPL
431623	2007 VG_{328}	—	November 8, 2007	Socorro	LINEAR	·	3.4 km	MPC · JPL
431624	2007 WE_{1}	—	October 21, 2007	Catalina	CSS	·	3.2 km	MPC · JPL
431625	2007 WX_{3}	—	November 18, 2007	Wrightwood	J. W. Young	·	440 m	MPC · JPL
431626	2007 WW_{21}	—	November 1, 2007	Kitt Peak	Spacewatch	EOS	1.9 km	MPC · JPL
431627	2007 WH_{22}	—	October 18, 2007	Kitt Peak	Spacewatch	·	560 m	MPC · JPL
431628	2007 WW_{23}	—	November 18, 2007	Mount Lemmon	Mount Lemmon Survey	·	3.1 km	MPC · JPL
431629	2007 WN_{25}	—	November 2, 2007	Kitt Peak	Spacewatch	·	2.6 km	MPC · JPL
431630	2007 WB_{32}	—	November 2, 2007	Kitt Peak	Spacewatch	·	2.7 km	MPC · JPL
431631	2007 WJ_{49}	—	November 20, 2007	Mount Lemmon	Mount Lemmon Survey	·	3.6 km	MPC · JPL
431632	2007 WK_{50}	—	November 20, 2007	Mount Lemmon	Mount Lemmon Survey	·	2.9 km	MPC · JPL
431633	2007 XQ_{1}	—	December 3, 2007	Catalina	CSS	·	3.1 km	MPC · JPL
431634	2007 XT_{11}	—	December 4, 2007	Kitt Peak	Spacewatch	·	2.6 km	MPC · JPL
431635	2007 XF_{19}	—	September 10, 2007	Mount Lemmon	Mount Lemmon Survey	·	2.9 km	MPC · JPL
431636	2007 YQ_{62}	—	December 30, 2007	Kitt Peak	Spacewatch	·	680 m	MPC · JPL
431637	2007 YS_{69}	—	December 30, 2007	Mount Lemmon	Mount Lemmon Survey	·	830 m	MPC · JPL
431638	2007 YZ_{69}	—	November 13, 2007	Mount Lemmon	Mount Lemmon Survey	·	590 m	MPC · JPL
431639	2008 AM_{6}	—	January 10, 2008	Mount Lemmon	Mount Lemmon Survey	·	3.1 km	MPC · JPL
431640	2008 AU_{14}	—	January 10, 2008	Kitt Peak	Spacewatch	·	540 m	MPC · JPL
431641	2008 AY_{27}	—	January 10, 2008	Mount Lemmon	Mount Lemmon Survey	V	540 m	MPC · JPL
431642	2008 AR_{34}	—	January 10, 2008	Kitt Peak	Spacewatch	·	480 m	MPC · JPL
431643	2008 AZ_{36}	—	January 10, 2008	Kitt Peak	Spacewatch	·	570 m	MPC · JPL
431644	2008 AK_{52}	—	January 11, 2008	Mount Lemmon	Mount Lemmon Survey	·	4.2 km	MPC · JPL
431645	2008 AG_{83}	—	December 28, 2007	Kitt Peak	Spacewatch	·	680 m	MPC · JPL
431646	2008 AF_{99}	—	January 14, 2008	Kitt Peak	Spacewatch	SYL · CYB	3.7 km	MPC · JPL
431647	2008 AB_{114}	—	April 10, 2005	Mount Lemmon	Mount Lemmon Survey	·	590 m	MPC · JPL
431648	2008 AD_{116}	—	January 11, 2008	Kitt Peak	Spacewatch	·	490 m	MPC · JPL
431649	2008 BM_{8}	—	January 16, 2008	Kitt Peak	Spacewatch	·	630 m	MPC · JPL
431650	2008 BY_{18}	—	January 29, 2008	La Sagra	OAM	·	760 m	MPC · JPL
431651	2008 BH_{21}	—	January 30, 2008	Mount Lemmon	Mount Lemmon Survey	·	700 m	MPC · JPL
431652	2008 BL_{32}	—	January 30, 2008	Mount Lemmon	Mount Lemmon Survey	·	620 m	MPC · JPL
431653	2008 BP_{39}	—	January 30, 2008	Catalina	CSS	·	840 m	MPC · JPL
431654	2008 BG_{49}	—	January 30, 2008	Mount Lemmon	Mount Lemmon Survey	·	1.0 km	MPC · JPL
431655	2008 BC_{52}	—	January 19, 2008	Mount Lemmon	Mount Lemmon Survey	·	660 m	MPC · JPL
431656	2008 CD_{5}	—	January 18, 2008	Catalina	CSS	PHO	980 m	MPC · JPL
431657	2008 CJ_{17}	—	January 11, 2008	Kitt Peak	Spacewatch	·	530 m	MPC · JPL
431658	2008 CR_{21}	—	December 19, 2007	Mount Lemmon	Mount Lemmon Survey	·	730 m	MPC · JPL
431659	2008 CE_{25}	—	February 1, 2008	Kitt Peak	Spacewatch	·	820 m	MPC · JPL
431660	2008 CS_{29}	—	February 2, 2008	Kitt Peak	Spacewatch	CYB	3.7 km	MPC · JPL
431661	2008 CQ_{43}	—	February 2, 2008	Kitt Peak	Spacewatch	·	810 m	MPC · JPL
431662	2008 CG_{45}	—	February 2, 2008	Kitt Peak	Spacewatch	·	690 m	MPC · JPL
431663	2008 CC_{60}	—	February 7, 2008	Kitt Peak	Spacewatch	NYS	660 m	MPC · JPL
431664	2008 CX_{75}	—	February 3, 2008	Kitt Peak	Spacewatch	·	750 m	MPC · JPL
431665	2008 CZ_{75}	—	February 3, 2008	Kitt Peak	Spacewatch	·	840 m	MPC · JPL
431666	2008 CR_{95}	—	February 8, 2008	Kitt Peak	Spacewatch	·	670 m	MPC · JPL
431667	2008 CB_{97}	—	February 9, 2008	Kitt Peak	Spacewatch	·	1.1 km	MPC · JPL
431668	2008 CU_{98}	—	February 2, 2008	Kitt Peak	Spacewatch	·	780 m	MPC · JPL
431669	2008 CQ_{109}	—	February 9, 2008	Kitt Peak	Spacewatch	·	1.0 km	MPC · JPL
431670	2008 CJ_{112}	—	February 10, 2008	Kitt Peak	Spacewatch	·	680 m	MPC · JPL
431671	2008 CQ_{119}	—	February 12, 2008	Dauban	Kugel, F.	·	760 m	MPC · JPL
431672	2008 CT_{137}	—	December 31, 2007	Mount Lemmon	Mount Lemmon Survey	·	700 m	MPC · JPL
431673	2008 CL_{143}	—	February 8, 2008	Kitt Peak	Spacewatch	·	630 m	MPC · JPL
431674	2008 CD_{158}	—	February 9, 2008	Catalina	CSS	·	820 m	MPC · JPL
431675	2008 CX_{202}	—	February 8, 2008	Kitt Peak	Spacewatch	·	730 m	MPC · JPL
431676	2008 CR_{203}	—	February 11, 2008	Kitt Peak	Spacewatch	·	1.3 km	MPC · JPL
431677	2008 CE_{206}	—	February 8, 2008	Mount Lemmon	Mount Lemmon Survey	·	520 m	MPC · JPL
431678	2008 CS_{209}	—	February 11, 2008	Mount Lemmon	Mount Lemmon Survey	·	590 m	MPC · JPL
431679	2008 DS_{7}	—	January 13, 2008	Kitt Peak	Spacewatch	·	690 m	MPC · JPL
431680	2008 DV_{15}	—	January 11, 2008	Mount Lemmon	Mount Lemmon Survey	·	1.2 km	MPC · JPL
431681	2008 DW_{17}	—	February 1, 2008	Kitt Peak	Spacewatch	·	610 m	MPC · JPL
431682	2008 DE_{18}	—	February 26, 2008	Mount Lemmon	Mount Lemmon Survey	·	650 m	MPC · JPL
431683	2008 DY_{19}	—	January 10, 2008	Kitt Peak	Spacewatch	·	520 m	MPC · JPL
431684	2008 DM_{23}	—	February 9, 2008	Kitt Peak	Spacewatch	·	640 m	MPC · JPL
431685	2008 DL_{30}	—	January 31, 2008	Mount Lemmon	Mount Lemmon Survey	·	1.2 km	MPC · JPL
431686	2008 DP_{34}	—	February 27, 2008	Mount Lemmon	Mount Lemmon Survey	·	950 m	MPC · JPL
431687	2008 DZ_{34}	—	February 27, 2008	Kitt Peak	Spacewatch	·	730 m	MPC · JPL
431688	2008 DC_{35}	—	February 27, 2008	Kitt Peak	Spacewatch	·	700 m	MPC · JPL
431689	2008 DP_{35}	—	February 27, 2008	Kitt Peak	Spacewatch	·	790 m	MPC · JPL
431690	2008 DZ_{35}	—	February 27, 2008	Mount Lemmon	Mount Lemmon Survey	·	870 m	MPC · JPL
431691	2008 DM_{44}	—	February 28, 2008	Mount Lemmon	Mount Lemmon Survey	·	830 m	MPC · JPL
431692	2008 DU_{60}	—	February 2, 2008	Kitt Peak	Spacewatch	NYS	660 m	MPC · JPL
431693	2008 DW_{63}	—	September 14, 2006	Kitt Peak	Spacewatch	·	670 m	MPC · JPL
431694	2008 DB_{70}	—	February 28, 2008	Mount Lemmon	Mount Lemmon Survey	·	800 m	MPC · JPL
431695	2008 DJ_{82}	—	February 28, 2008	Kitt Peak	Spacewatch	·	770 m	MPC · JPL
431696	2008 DE_{85}	—	February 28, 2008	Kitt Peak	Spacewatch	MAS	560 m	MPC · JPL
431697	2008 DK_{87}	—	February 28, 2008	Kitt Peak	Spacewatch	·	800 m	MPC · JPL
431698	2008 ES	—	March 2, 2008	Mount Lemmon	Mount Lemmon Survey	APO +1km	780 m	MPC · JPL
431699	2008 EL_{10}	—	February 10, 2008	Kitt Peak	Spacewatch	·	900 m	MPC · JPL
431700	2008 EF_{23}	—	March 3, 2008	Catalina	CSS	·	1.1 km	MPC · JPL

== 431701–431800 ==
back to top

Designation			Discovery			Properties		Ref
Permanent	Provisional	Named after	Date	Site	Discoverer(s)	Category	Diam.	Ref
431701	2008 EF_{31}	—	December 18, 2003	Socorro	LINEAR	·	710 m	MPC · JPL
431702	2008 EW_{55}	—	March 7, 2008	Mount Lemmon	Mount Lemmon Survey	·	630 m	MPC · JPL
431703	2008 EN_{67}	—	March 9, 2008	Mount Lemmon	Mount Lemmon Survey	·	730 m	MPC · JPL
431704	2008 EF_{69}	—	March 11, 2008	Catalina	CSS	·	340 m	MPC · JPL
431705	2008 EZ_{76}	—	March 7, 2008	Kitt Peak	Spacewatch	·	590 m	MPC · JPL
431706	2008 ET_{82}	—	March 8, 2008	Socorro	LINEAR	·	760 m	MPC · JPL
431707	2008 EJ_{88}	—	February 26, 2008	Kitt Peak	Spacewatch	·	780 m	MPC · JPL
431708	2008 EO_{88}	—	February 13, 2008	Kitt Peak	Spacewatch	·	720 m	MPC · JPL
431709	2008 EN_{116}	—	March 8, 2008	Kitt Peak	Spacewatch	·	810 m	MPC · JPL
431710	2008 EF_{117}	—	March 8, 2008	Kitt Peak	Spacewatch	·	700 m	MPC · JPL
431711	2008 ER_{120}	—	March 9, 2008	Kitt Peak	Spacewatch	·	640 m	MPC · JPL
431712	2008 ES_{120}	—	March 9, 2008	Kitt Peak	Spacewatch	·	780 m	MPC · JPL
431713	2008 EB_{128}	—	February 29, 2008	Kitt Peak	Spacewatch	·	930 m	MPC · JPL
431714	2008 ED_{131}	—	February 10, 2008	Kitt Peak	Spacewatch	·	1.1 km	MPC · JPL
431715	2008 ET_{143}	—	February 13, 2008	Mount Lemmon	Mount Lemmon Survey	·	800 m	MPC · JPL
431716	2008 EK_{147}	—	March 1, 2008	Kitt Peak	Spacewatch	NYS	860 m	MPC · JPL
431717	2008 EQ_{147}	—	March 1, 2008	Kitt Peak	Spacewatch	·	820 m	MPC · JPL
431718	2008 EZ_{147}	—	March 1, 2008	Kitt Peak	Spacewatch	·	690 m	MPC · JPL
431719	2008 EL_{151}	—	March 1, 2008	Kitt Peak	Spacewatch	·	610 m	MPC · JPL
431720	2008 EF_{152}	—	March 10, 2008	Kitt Peak	Spacewatch	·	730 m	MPC · JPL
431721	2008 EF_{163}	—	March 10, 2008	Mount Lemmon	Mount Lemmon Survey	·	720 m	MPC · JPL
431722	2008 EM_{166}	—	March 6, 2008	Catalina	CSS	PHO	2.7 km	MPC · JPL
431723	2008 ET_{167}	—	March 9, 2008	Socorro	LINEAR	·	700 m	MPC · JPL
431724	2008 FA_{4}	—	March 25, 2008	Kitt Peak	Spacewatch	·	920 m	MPC · JPL
431725	2008 FH_{18}	—	February 28, 2008	Mount Lemmon	Mount Lemmon Survey	·	730 m	MPC · JPL
431726	2008 FP_{24}	—	July 11, 2005	Catalina	CSS	·	1.7 km	MPC · JPL
431727	2008 FZ_{35}	—	March 28, 2008	Mount Lemmon	Mount Lemmon Survey	·	800 m	MPC · JPL
431728	2008 FC_{41}	—	March 28, 2008	Kitt Peak	Spacewatch	NYS	1.1 km	MPC · JPL
431729	2008 FP_{48}	—	March 28, 2008	Mount Lemmon	Mount Lemmon Survey	MAS	570 m	MPC · JPL
431730	2008 FG_{52}	—	March 28, 2008	Mount Lemmon	Mount Lemmon Survey	·	720 m	MPC · JPL
431731	2008 FG_{56}	—	March 28, 2008	Mount Lemmon	Mount Lemmon Survey	·	630 m	MPC · JPL
431732	2008 FP_{56}	—	March 28, 2008	Mount Lemmon	Mount Lemmon Survey	·	940 m	MPC · JPL
431733	2008 FH_{61}	—	March 30, 2008	Kitt Peak	Spacewatch	·	1.0 km	MPC · JPL
431734	2008 FP_{69}	—	March 28, 2008	Mount Lemmon	Mount Lemmon Survey	NYS	1.2 km	MPC · JPL
431735	2008 FB_{82}	—	March 13, 2008	Kitt Peak	Spacewatch	MAS	530 m	MPC · JPL
431736	2008 FP_{87}	—	March 28, 2008	Mount Lemmon	Mount Lemmon Survey	MAS	640 m	MPC · JPL
431737	2008 FV_{106}	—	March 31, 2008	Kitt Peak	Spacewatch	·	740 m	MPC · JPL
431738	2008 FC_{107}	—	March 31, 2008	Kitt Peak	Spacewatch	·	1.0 km	MPC · JPL
431739	2008 FL_{108}	—	March 31, 2008	Mount Lemmon	Mount Lemmon Survey	·	730 m	MPC · JPL
431740	2008 FC_{112}	—	March 31, 2008	Kitt Peak	Spacewatch	·	620 m	MPC · JPL
431741	2008 FN_{123}	—	March 29, 2008	Kitt Peak	Spacewatch	MAS	600 m	MPC · JPL
431742	2008 FW_{128}	—	March 29, 2008	Kitt Peak	Spacewatch	·	670 m	MPC · JPL
431743	2008 FN_{137}	—	March 30, 2008	Kitt Peak	Spacewatch	PHO	770 m	MPC · JPL
431744	2008 GH_{2}	—	October 10, 2007	Catalina	CSS	·	3.3 km	MPC · JPL
431745	2008 GY_{4}	—	March 12, 2008	Kitt Peak	Spacewatch	·	670 m	MPC · JPL
431746	2008 GW_{10}	—	April 1, 2008	Kitt Peak	Spacewatch	·	950 m	MPC · JPL
431747	2008 GF_{22}	—	April 1, 2008	Kitt Peak	Spacewatch	·	720 m	MPC · JPL
431748	2008 GO_{28}	—	April 3, 2008	Kitt Peak	Spacewatch	·	720 m	MPC · JPL
431749	2008 GZ_{32}	—	December 29, 2003	Kitt Peak	Spacewatch	·	780 m	MPC · JPL
431750	2008 GS_{55}	—	April 5, 2008	Mount Lemmon	Mount Lemmon Survey	·	750 m	MPC · JPL
431751	2008 GS_{64}	—	April 6, 2008	Kitt Peak	Spacewatch	·	620 m	MPC · JPL
431752	2008 GZ_{72}	—	April 7, 2008	Mount Lemmon	Mount Lemmon Survey	·	1.0 km	MPC · JPL
431753	2008 GH_{74}	—	April 7, 2008	Kitt Peak	Spacewatch	·	1.0 km	MPC · JPL
431754	2008 GA_{77}	—	April 7, 2008	Kitt Peak	Spacewatch	·	1.2 km	MPC · JPL
431755	2008 GE_{81}	—	April 7, 2008	Kitt Peak	Spacewatch	·	730 m	MPC · JPL
431756	2008 GJ_{88}	—	April 6, 2008	Kitt Peak	Spacewatch	NYS	950 m	MPC · JPL
431757	2008 GY_{89}	—	April 6, 2008	Mount Lemmon	Mount Lemmon Survey	·	740 m	MPC · JPL
431758	2008 GM_{119}	—	April 11, 2008	Kitt Peak	Spacewatch	·	1.1 km	MPC · JPL
431759	2008 GK_{146}	—	April 15, 2008	Kitt Peak	Spacewatch	MAS	660 m	MPC · JPL
431760	2008 HE	—	April 18, 2008	Catalina	CSS	T_{j} (2.7) · APO +1km	850 m	MPC · JPL
431761	2008 HU_{1}	—	April 24, 2008	Kitt Peak	Spacewatch	·	870 m	MPC · JPL
431762	2008 HP_{12}	—	July 5, 2005	Kitt Peak	Spacewatch	·	860 m	MPC · JPL
431763	2008 HN_{15}	—	April 25, 2008	Kitt Peak	Spacewatch	·	1.2 km	MPC · JPL
431764	2008 HU_{27}	—	April 28, 2008	Kitt Peak	Spacewatch	·	760 m	MPC · JPL
431765	2008 HB_{28}	—	April 28, 2008	Kitt Peak	Spacewatch	·	830 m	MPC · JPL
431766	2008 HT_{39}	—	March 15, 2008	Kitt Peak	Spacewatch	·	800 m	MPC · JPL
431767	2008 HZ_{50}	—	April 29, 2008	Kitt Peak	Spacewatch	·	800 m	MPC · JPL
431768	2008 HL_{54}	—	April 29, 2008	Kitt Peak	Spacewatch	3:2 · SHU	5.9 km	MPC · JPL
431769	2008 HQ_{54}	—	April 29, 2008	Kitt Peak	Spacewatch	NYS	1.2 km	MPC · JPL
431770	2008 HH_{59}	—	April 30, 2008	Mount Lemmon	Mount Lemmon Survey	·	880 m	MPC · JPL
431771	2008 HH_{65}	—	April 29, 2008	Mount Lemmon	Mount Lemmon Survey	·	990 m	MPC · JPL
431772	2008 JN_{1}	—	May 2, 2008	Mount Lemmon	Mount Lemmon Survey	·	1.1 km	MPC · JPL
431773	2008 JK_{11}	—	May 3, 2008	Kitt Peak	Spacewatch	V	630 m	MPC · JPL
431774	2008 JT_{16}	—	May 3, 2008	Mount Lemmon	Mount Lemmon Survey	·	840 m	MPC · JPL
431775	2008 JO_{24}	—	May 10, 2008	Mount Lemmon	Mount Lemmon Survey	AMO	630 m	MPC · JPL
431776	2008 JQ_{24}	—	December 29, 2005	Mount Lemmon	Mount Lemmon Survey	AMO +1km	960 m	MPC · JPL
431777	2008 JC_{35}	—	May 14, 2008	Catalina	CSS	PHO	1.3 km	MPC · JPL
431778	2008 KR_{1}	—	May 3, 2008	Mount Lemmon	Mount Lemmon Survey	·	900 m	MPC · JPL
431779	2008 KD_{9}	—	May 27, 2008	Kitt Peak	Spacewatch	NYS	940 m	MPC · JPL
431780	2008 LR	—	June 1, 2008	Mount Lemmon	Mount Lemmon Survey	·	1.1 km	MPC · JPL
431781	2008 LY_{3}	—	June 2, 2008	Mount Lemmon	Mount Lemmon Survey	·	1.1 km	MPC · JPL
431782	2008 LF_{13}	—	June 6, 2008	Kitt Peak	Spacewatch	NYS	900 m	MPC · JPL
431783	2008 LC_{17}	—	March 15, 2008	Mount Lemmon	Mount Lemmon Survey	·	1.2 km	MPC · JPL
431784	2008 MF	—	June 22, 2008	Kitt Peak	Spacewatch	·	1.0 km	MPC · JPL
431785	2008 OZ_{9}	—	July 26, 2008	Siding Spring	SSS	H	600 m	MPC · JPL
431786	2008 OY_{19}	—	July 30, 2008	Kitt Peak	Spacewatch	526	2.8 km	MPC · JPL
431787	2008 PG_{4}	—	December 12, 1999	Kitt Peak	Spacewatch	EOS	2.3 km	MPC · JPL
431788	2008 PH_{4}	—	August 5, 2008	Hibiscus	S. F. Hönig, Teamo, N.	(5)	1.3 km	MPC · JPL
431789	2008 PM_{8}	—	July 26, 2008	Siding Spring	SSS	EUN	1.3 km	MPC · JPL
431790	2008 PA_{11}	—	June 14, 2008	Siding Spring	SSS	·	1.7 km	MPC · JPL
431791	2008 PK_{14}	—	February 1, 2006	Mount Lemmon	Mount Lemmon Survey	·	2.1 km	MPC · JPL
431792	2008 PK_{22}	—	August 26, 2008	Socorro	LINEAR	·	1.7 km	MPC · JPL
431793	2008 QX_{3}	—	July 29, 2008	Kitt Peak	Spacewatch	H	480 m	MPC · JPL
431794	2008 QX_{7}	—	August 23, 2008	Hibiscus	Teamo, N.	·	1.5 km	MPC · JPL
431795	2008 QW_{15}	—	August 28, 2008	La Sagra	OAM	JUN	1.5 km	MPC · JPL
431796	2008 QR_{18}	—	August 29, 2008	Pla D'Arguines	R. Ferrando	·	1.5 km	MPC · JPL
431797	2008 QY_{22}	—	August 26, 2008	Socorro	LINEAR	·	2.0 km	MPC · JPL
431798	2008 QY_{26}	—	January 2, 2006	Mount Lemmon	Mount Lemmon Survey	·	1.3 km	MPC · JPL
431799	2008 QJ_{34}	—	July 29, 2008	Kitt Peak	Spacewatch	MAS	690 m	MPC · JPL
431800	2008 QN_{35}	—	August 26, 2008	Siding Spring	SSS	·	1.9 km	MPC · JPL

== 431801–431900 ==
back to top

Designation			Discovery			Properties		Ref
Permanent	Provisional	Named after	Date	Site	Discoverer(s)	Category	Diam.	Ref
431801	2008 QV_{35}	—	August 21, 2008	Kitt Peak	Spacewatch	·	3.1 km	MPC · JPL
431802	2008 QW_{38}	—	August 24, 2008	Kitt Peak	Spacewatch	H	410 m	MPC · JPL
431803 Šventoji	2008 QL_{40}	Šventoji	August 31, 2008	Moletai	Molėtai	·	1.5 km	MPC · JPL
431804	2008 QC_{46}	—	July 29, 2008	Mount Lemmon	Mount Lemmon Survey	·	1.4 km	MPC · JPL
431805	2008 RN_{6}	—	September 3, 2008	Kitt Peak	Spacewatch	EUN	1.1 km	MPC · JPL
431806	2008 RD_{14}	—	August 24, 2008	Kitt Peak	Spacewatch	L4	9.2 km	MPC · JPL
431807	2008 RO_{15}	—	September 4, 2008	Kitt Peak	Spacewatch	L4	9.2 km	MPC · JPL
431808	2008 RK_{18}	—	August 24, 2008	Kitt Peak	Spacewatch	·	1.1 km	MPC · JPL
431809	2008 RS_{23}	—	September 5, 2008	Socorro	LINEAR	·	2.3 km	MPC · JPL
431810	2008 RF_{24}	—	September 5, 2008	Socorro	LINEAR	·	2.3 km	MPC · JPL
431811	2008 RY_{29}	—	September 2, 2008	Kitt Peak	Spacewatch	·	980 m	MPC · JPL
431812	2008 RF_{36}	—	September 2, 2008	Kitt Peak	Spacewatch	·	1.6 km	MPC · JPL
431813	2008 RU_{36}	—	September 2, 2008	Kitt Peak	Spacewatch	·	1.8 km	MPC · JPL
431814	2008 RL_{46}	—	September 2, 2008	Kitt Peak	Spacewatch	·	1.4 km	MPC · JPL
431815	2008 RM_{59}	—	September 3, 2008	Kitt Peak	Spacewatch	·	1.8 km	MPC · JPL
431816	2008 RD_{62}	—	September 4, 2008	Kitt Peak	Spacewatch	·	1.4 km	MPC · JPL
431817	2008 RS_{64}	—	September 4, 2008	Kitt Peak	Spacewatch	·	1.7 km	MPC · JPL
431818	2008 RL_{68}	—	September 4, 2008	Kitt Peak	Spacewatch	·	2.8 km	MPC · JPL
431819	2008 RW_{95}	—	September 7, 2008	Catalina	CSS	·	1.7 km	MPC · JPL
431820	2008 RD_{105}	—	September 6, 2008	Catalina	CSS	(5)	1.7 km	MPC · JPL
431821	2008 RL_{107}	—	September 7, 2008	Catalina	CSS	·	1.3 km	MPC · JPL
431822	2008 RC_{110}	—	September 3, 2008	Kitt Peak	Spacewatch	L4 · HEK	6.8 km	MPC · JPL
431823	2008 RO_{114}	—	September 6, 2008	Mount Lemmon	Mount Lemmon Survey	·	1.4 km	MPC · JPL
431824	2008 RV_{120}	—	September 7, 2008	Mount Lemmon	Mount Lemmon Survey	·	1.8 km	MPC · JPL
431825	2008 RF_{122}	—	September 3, 2008	Kitt Peak	Spacewatch	PAD	1.6 km	MPC · JPL
431826	2008 RL_{126}	—	September 2, 2008	Kitt Peak	Spacewatch	L4	8.8 km	MPC · JPL
431827	2008 RU_{131}	—	September 8, 2008	Kitt Peak	Spacewatch	·	1.6 km	MPC · JPL
431828	2008 RY_{142}	—	February 7, 2006	Kitt Peak	Spacewatch	·	1.5 km	MPC · JPL
431829	2008 RG_{146}	—	September 6, 2008	Catalina	CSS	H	480 m	MPC · JPL
431830	2008 SW	—	September 21, 2008	Hibiscus	Teamo, N.	MAR	1.0 km	MPC · JPL
431831	2008 SV_{8}	—	July 30, 2008	Mount Lemmon	Mount Lemmon Survey	·	1.8 km	MPC · JPL
431832	2008 SG_{10}	—	September 22, 2008	Socorro	LINEAR	·	1.8 km	MPC · JPL
431833	2008 SW_{10}	—	September 7, 2008	Mount Lemmon	Mount Lemmon Survey	AEO	1.2 km	MPC · JPL
431834	2008 SA_{11}	—	September 6, 2008	Catalina	CSS	·	1.7 km	MPC · JPL
431835	2008 SA_{16}	—	September 19, 2008	Kitt Peak	Spacewatch	·	3.4 km	MPC · JPL
431836	2008 SO_{26}	—	September 7, 2008	Mount Lemmon	Mount Lemmon Survey	BRA	1.1 km	MPC · JPL
431837	2008 SJ_{27}	—	September 4, 2008	Kitt Peak	Spacewatch	H	550 m	MPC · JPL
431838	2008 SG_{32}	—	September 20, 2008	Kitt Peak	Spacewatch	·	1.7 km	MPC · JPL
431839	2008 SO_{41}	—	September 6, 2008	Mount Lemmon	Mount Lemmon Survey	·	1.6 km	MPC · JPL
431840	2008 SG_{45}	—	September 20, 2008	Kitt Peak	Spacewatch	BRA	1.4 km	MPC · JPL
431841	2008 SS_{45}	—	September 20, 2008	Kitt Peak	Spacewatch	·	2.2 km	MPC · JPL
431842	2008 SO_{51}	—	September 4, 2008	Kitt Peak	Spacewatch	·	1.8 km	MPC · JPL
431843	2008 SB_{53}	—	September 20, 2008	Mount Lemmon	Mount Lemmon Survey	·	1.4 km	MPC · JPL
431844	2008 SJ_{53}	—	September 20, 2008	Mount Lemmon	Mount Lemmon Survey	·	1.2 km	MPC · JPL
431845	2008 SP_{57}	—	September 20, 2008	Mount Lemmon	Mount Lemmon Survey	·	1.7 km	MPC · JPL
431846	2008 SF_{59}	—	September 20, 2008	Kitt Peak	Spacewatch	MAR	1.5 km	MPC · JPL
431847	2008 SQ_{59}	—	September 20, 2008	Kitt Peak	Spacewatch	·	2.2 km	MPC · JPL
431848	2008 SU_{59}	—	September 20, 2008	Kitt Peak	Spacewatch	·	1.6 km	MPC · JPL
431849	2008 SV_{60}	—	September 20, 2008	Catalina	CSS	·	1.9 km	MPC · JPL
431850	2008 SJ_{65}	—	September 21, 2008	Mount Lemmon	Mount Lemmon Survey	·	2.2 km	MPC · JPL
431851	2008 SS_{67}	—	September 6, 2008	Mount Lemmon	Mount Lemmon Survey	·	1.4 km	MPC · JPL
431852	2008 SA_{72}	—	September 9, 2008	Mount Lemmon	Mount Lemmon Survey	EUN	1.3 km	MPC · JPL
431853	2008 SO_{72}	—	September 22, 2008	Kitt Peak	Spacewatch	·	2.1 km	MPC · JPL
431854	2008 SC_{84}	—	September 24, 2008	Dauban	Kugel, F.	JUN	1.1 km	MPC · JPL
431855	2008 SW_{84}	—	September 28, 2008	Prairie Grass	Mahony, J.	DOR	2.7 km	MPC · JPL
431856	2008 SJ_{94}	—	September 2, 2008	Kitt Peak	Spacewatch	·	1.8 km	MPC · JPL
431857	2008 SL_{95}	—	September 21, 2008	Kitt Peak	Spacewatch	·	2.3 km	MPC · JPL
431858	2008 ST_{97}	—	September 21, 2008	Kitt Peak	Spacewatch	·	1.9 km	MPC · JPL
431859	2008 SW_{100}	—	September 21, 2008	Kitt Peak	Spacewatch	·	1.1 km	MPC · JPL
431860	2008 SW_{106}	—	September 21, 2008	Kitt Peak	Spacewatch	·	2.1 km	MPC · JPL
431861	2008 SA_{109}	—	September 22, 2008	Mount Lemmon	Mount Lemmon Survey	·	1.1 km	MPC · JPL
431862	2008 SP_{112}	—	September 22, 2008	Kitt Peak	Spacewatch	·	1.7 km	MPC · JPL
431863	2008 SF_{114}	—	September 22, 2008	Kitt Peak	Spacewatch	·	1.8 km	MPC · JPL
431864	2008 SW_{115}	—	September 22, 2008	Kitt Peak	Spacewatch	HOF	2.4 km	MPC · JPL
431865	2008 SU_{121}	—	September 22, 2008	Mount Lemmon	Mount Lemmon Survey	NEM	2.3 km	MPC · JPL
431866	2008 SM_{122}	—	September 22, 2008	Mount Lemmon	Mount Lemmon Survey	·	1.7 km	MPC · JPL
431867	2008 SD_{124}	—	September 22, 2008	Mount Lemmon	Mount Lemmon Survey	·	1.2 km	MPC · JPL
431868	2008 SP_{134}	—	September 23, 2008	Kitt Peak	Spacewatch	L4	10 km	MPC · JPL
431869	2008 SV_{142}	—	September 24, 2008	Catalina	CSS	·	1.8 km	MPC · JPL
431870	2008 SA_{143}	—	September 24, 2008	Mount Lemmon	Mount Lemmon Survey	·	1.8 km	MPC · JPL
431871	2008 SS_{151}	—	September 20, 2008	Catalina	CSS	JUN	1.3 km	MPC · JPL
431872	2008 SK_{161}	—	September 28, 2008	Socorro	LINEAR	·	1.9 km	MPC · JPL
431873	2008 SU_{164}	—	September 24, 2008	Kitt Peak	Spacewatch	·	1.1 km	MPC · JPL
431874	2008 SH_{169}	—	September 3, 2008	Kitt Peak	Spacewatch	·	1.8 km	MPC · JPL
431875	2008 SM_{170}	—	September 3, 2008	Kitt Peak	Spacewatch	L4	8.0 km	MPC · JPL
431876	2008 SH_{184}	—	September 9, 2008	Mount Lemmon	Mount Lemmon Survey	EUN	1.4 km	MPC · JPL
431877	2008 SU_{191}	—	September 25, 2008	Kitt Peak	Spacewatch	·	2.0 km	MPC · JPL
431878	2008 SR_{192}	—	September 25, 2008	Kitt Peak	Spacewatch	H	470 m	MPC · JPL
431879	2008 SZ_{200}	—	September 26, 2008	Kitt Peak	Spacewatch	·	1.8 km	MPC · JPL
431880	2008 SN_{202}	—	September 7, 2008	Mount Lemmon	Mount Lemmon Survey	·	1.9 km	MPC · JPL
431881	2008 SX_{202}	—	September 6, 2008	Mount Lemmon	Mount Lemmon Survey	·	1.2 km	MPC · JPL
431882	2008 SP_{204}	—	September 26, 2008	Kitt Peak	Spacewatch	·	2.8 km	MPC · JPL
431883	2008 SE_{218}	—	September 30, 2008	La Sagra	OAM	·	2.5 km	MPC · JPL
431884	2008 SL_{232}	—	August 24, 2008	Kitt Peak	Spacewatch	·	1.3 km	MPC · JPL
431885	2008 SW_{242}	—	September 6, 2008	Mount Lemmon	Mount Lemmon Survey	·	2.0 km	MPC · JPL
431886	2008 SK_{258}	—	September 22, 2008	Mount Lemmon	Mount Lemmon Survey	·	1.7 km	MPC · JPL
431887	2008 SU_{261}	—	September 24, 2008	Kitt Peak	Spacewatch	KOR	1.3 km	MPC · JPL
431888	2008 SA_{262}	—	September 24, 2008	Kitt Peak	Spacewatch	·	1.0 km	MPC · JPL
431889	2008 SL_{264}	—	September 25, 2008	Kitt Peak	Spacewatch	AGN	1.1 km	MPC · JPL
431890	2008 SB_{265}	—	September 26, 2008	Kitt Peak	Spacewatch	HOF	2.2 km	MPC · JPL
431891	2008 SM_{265}	—	September 28, 2008	Mount Lemmon	Mount Lemmon Survey	·	1.4 km	MPC · JPL
431892	2008 SG_{277}	—	September 24, 2008	Kitt Peak	Spacewatch	AST	1.4 km	MPC · JPL
431893	2008 SH_{280}	—	September 6, 2008	Catalina	CSS	·	2.0 km	MPC · JPL
431894	2008 SN_{284}	—	September 24, 2008	Kitt Peak	Spacewatch	·	1.7 km	MPC · JPL
431895	2008 SO_{284}	—	September 24, 2008	Kitt Peak	Spacewatch	·	1.6 km	MPC · JPL
431896	2008 SY_{285}	—	September 22, 2008	Kitt Peak	Spacewatch	WIT	910 m	MPC · JPL
431897	2008 SZ_{287}	—	September 23, 2008	Kitt Peak	Spacewatch	·	1.3 km	MPC · JPL
431898	2008 SO_{302}	—	September 23, 2008	Kitt Peak	Spacewatch	H	450 m	MPC · JPL
431899	2008 SL_{305}	—	September 27, 2008	Mount Lemmon	Mount Lemmon Survey	·	2.2 km	MPC · JPL
431900	2008 SZ_{305}	—	September 28, 2008	Socorro	LINEAR	·	1.6 km	MPC · JPL

== 431901–432000 ==
back to top

Designation			Discovery			Properties		Ref
Permanent	Provisional	Named after	Date	Site	Discoverer(s)	Category	Diam.	Ref
431901	2008 TN_{2}	—	October 3, 2008	La Sagra	OAM	H	730 m	MPC · JPL
431902	2008 TO_{5}	—	October 1, 2008	La Sagra	OAM	·	2.1 km	MPC · JPL
431903	2008 TF_{8}	—	September 29, 2008	Catalina	CSS	·	2.5 km	MPC · JPL
431904	2008 TR_{8}	—	October 5, 2008	La Sagra	OAM	H	470 m	MPC · JPL
431905	2008 TQ_{9}	—	October 2, 2008	Mount Lemmon	Mount Lemmon Survey	·	1.4 km	MPC · JPL
431906	2008 TL_{23}	—	September 6, 2008	Mount Lemmon	Mount Lemmon Survey	THM	1.9 km	MPC · JPL
431907	2008 TY_{30}	—	October 1, 2008	Kitt Peak	Spacewatch	KOR	1.1 km	MPC · JPL
431908	2008 TF_{31}	—	October 1, 2008	Kitt Peak	Spacewatch	·	1.8 km	MPC · JPL
431909	2008 TH_{34}	—	October 16, 2003	Kitt Peak	Spacewatch	·	1.5 km	MPC · JPL
431910	2008 TB_{36}	—	October 1, 2008	Mount Lemmon	Mount Lemmon Survey	L4	10 km	MPC · JPL
431911	2008 TM_{39}	—	October 1, 2008	Kitt Peak	Spacewatch	HOF	2.4 km	MPC · JPL
431912	2008 TQ_{46}	—	October 1, 2008	Kitt Peak	Spacewatch	AGN	1.1 km	MPC · JPL
431913	2008 TQ_{47}	—	September 16, 2003	Kitt Peak	Spacewatch	·	1.7 km	MPC · JPL
431914	2008 TA_{54}	—	April 22, 2007	Kitt Peak	Spacewatch	·	1.1 km	MPC · JPL
431915	2008 TV_{56}	—	September 24, 2008	Kitt Peak	Spacewatch	KOR	1.0 km	MPC · JPL
431916	2008 TF_{61}	—	September 6, 2008	Mount Lemmon	Mount Lemmon Survey	·	2.1 km	MPC · JPL
431917	2008 TP_{64}	—	October 2, 2008	Kitt Peak	Spacewatch	·	1.6 km	MPC · JPL
431918	2008 TB_{66}	—	September 24, 2008	Kitt Peak	Spacewatch	·	1.9 km	MPC · JPL
431919	2008 TZ_{66}	—	October 2, 2008	Kitt Peak	Spacewatch	AST	1.6 km	MPC · JPL
431920	2008 TA_{71}	—	October 2, 2008	Kitt Peak	Spacewatch	·	1.7 km	MPC · JPL
431921	2008 TC_{73}	—	October 2, 2008	Kitt Peak	Spacewatch	·	2.5 km	MPC · JPL
431922	2008 TM_{75}	—	October 2, 2008	Kitt Peak	Spacewatch	·	1.6 km	MPC · JPL
431923	2008 TL_{91}	—	September 21, 2008	Kitt Peak	Spacewatch	·	2.1 km	MPC · JPL
431924	2008 TM_{91}	—	October 4, 2008	La Sagra	OAM	·	1.7 km	MPC · JPL
431925	2008 TR_{100}	—	September 14, 1999	Kitt Peak	Spacewatch	·	1.6 km	MPC · JPL
431926	2008 TW_{100}	—	October 6, 2008	Kitt Peak	Spacewatch	·	1.7 km	MPC · JPL
431927	2008 TZ_{125}	—	September 23, 2008	Kitt Peak	Spacewatch	·	1.7 km	MPC · JPL
431928	2008 TZ_{129}	—	February 25, 2006	Kitt Peak	Spacewatch	PAD	1.7 km	MPC · JPL
431929	2008 TZ_{130}	—	September 23, 2008	Kitt Peak	Spacewatch	·	1.8 km	MPC · JPL
431930	2008 TA_{131}	—	September 23, 2008	Kitt Peak	Spacewatch	·	1.9 km	MPC · JPL
431931	2008 TF_{140}	—	September 9, 2008	Mount Lemmon	Mount Lemmon Survey	·	2.3 km	MPC · JPL
431932	2008 TO_{144}	—	December 11, 2004	Kitt Peak	Spacewatch	AST	1.5 km	MPC · JPL
431933	2008 TE_{145}	—	September 3, 2008	Kitt Peak	Spacewatch	AST	1.5 km	MPC · JPL
431934	2008 TH_{158}	—	September 20, 2008	Mount Lemmon	Mount Lemmon Survey	·	2.0 km	MPC · JPL
431935	2008 TR_{158}	—	April 11, 2003	Kitt Peak	Spacewatch	L4	7.9 km	MPC · JPL
431936	2008 TR_{161}	—	October 6, 2008	Mount Lemmon	Mount Lemmon Survey	·	2.3 km	MPC · JPL
431937	2008 TN_{167}	—	October 9, 2008	Kitt Peak	Spacewatch	NEM	2.0 km	MPC · JPL
431938	2008 TO_{168}	—	October 2, 2008	Mount Lemmon	Mount Lemmon Survey	·	2.1 km	MPC · JPL
431939	2008 TL_{174}	—	October 3, 2008	Mount Lemmon	Mount Lemmon Survey	·	2.0 km	MPC · JPL
431940	2008 TF_{177}	—	October 7, 2008	Mount Lemmon	Mount Lemmon Survey	·	1.6 km	MPC · JPL
431941	2008 TP_{184}	—	October 6, 2008	Kitt Peak	Spacewatch	·	1.7 km	MPC · JPL
431942	2008 TR_{188}	—	October 10, 2008	Catalina	CSS	H	510 m	MPC · JPL
431943	2008 UG_{8}	—	October 17, 2008	Kitt Peak	Spacewatch	·	1.6 km	MPC · JPL
431944	2008 UN_{11}	—	October 17, 2008	Kitt Peak	Spacewatch	AGN	1.0 km	MPC · JPL
431945	2008 UR_{22}	—	October 19, 2008	Kitt Peak	Spacewatch	·	1.5 km	MPC · JPL
431946	2008 UA_{30}	—	October 20, 2008	Kitt Peak	Spacewatch	·	1.8 km	MPC · JPL
431947	2008 UC_{30}	—	October 20, 2008	Kitt Peak	Spacewatch	·	1.7 km	MPC · JPL
431948	2008 UH_{31}	—	October 20, 2008	Kitt Peak	Spacewatch	AGN	1.3 km	MPC · JPL
431949	2008 UH_{37}	—	September 6, 2008	Mount Lemmon	Mount Lemmon Survey	·	2.3 km	MPC · JPL
431950	2008 UY_{39}	—	October 2, 2008	Mount Lemmon	Mount Lemmon Survey	·	1.4 km	MPC · JPL
431951	2008 UJ_{52}	—	October 20, 2008	Kitt Peak	Spacewatch	·	1.7 km	MPC · JPL
431952	2008 UD_{61}	—	October 21, 2008	Kitt Peak	Spacewatch	AGN	1.1 km	MPC · JPL
431953	2008 UZ_{65}	—	October 21, 2008	Kitt Peak	Spacewatch	H	700 m	MPC · JPL
431954	2008 UT_{67}	—	October 21, 2008	Kitt Peak	Spacewatch	H	500 m	MPC · JPL
431955	2008 UQ_{68}	—	September 24, 2008	Mount Lemmon	Mount Lemmon Survey	·	1.9 km	MPC · JPL
431956	2008 UB_{75}	—	October 21, 2008	Kitt Peak	Spacewatch	HOF	3.2 km	MPC · JPL
431957	2008 UF_{87}	—	October 23, 2008	Mount Lemmon	Mount Lemmon Survey	H	580 m	MPC · JPL
431958	2008 UB_{89}	—	October 8, 2008	Kitt Peak	Spacewatch	HOF	2.4 km	MPC · JPL
431959	2008 UC_{96}	—	October 24, 2008	Socorro	LINEAR	H	630 m	MPC · JPL
431960	2008 UU_{102}	—	September 26, 2008	Kitt Peak	Spacewatch	·	1.5 km	MPC · JPL
431961	2008 UF_{108}	—	October 7, 2008	Mount Lemmon	Mount Lemmon Survey	·	1.9 km	MPC · JPL
431962	2008 UX_{108}	—	October 21, 2008	Kitt Peak	Spacewatch	·	2.3 km	MPC · JPL
431963	2008 UB_{109}	—	October 21, 2008	Mount Lemmon	Mount Lemmon Survey	H	680 m	MPC · JPL
431964	2008 UM_{116}	—	October 22, 2008	Kitt Peak	Spacewatch	EUN	1.1 km	MPC · JPL
431965	2008 US_{118}	—	October 22, 2008	Kitt Peak	Spacewatch	(194)	1.5 km	MPC · JPL
431966	2008 UD_{121}	—	October 22, 2008	Kitt Peak	Spacewatch	·	1.1 km	MPC · JPL
431967	2008 UT_{127}	—	October 22, 2008	Kitt Peak	Spacewatch	·	2.1 km	MPC · JPL
431968	2008 UP_{130}	—	October 2, 2008	Kitt Peak	Spacewatch	(5)	1.0 km	MPC · JPL
431969	2008 UB_{134}	—	September 6, 2008	Mount Lemmon	Mount Lemmon Survey	PAD	1.8 km	MPC · JPL
431970	2008 UV_{136}	—	October 23, 2008	Kitt Peak	Spacewatch	·	2.7 km	MPC · JPL
431971	2008 UJ_{138}	—	October 23, 2008	Kitt Peak	Spacewatch	AST	2.7 km	MPC · JPL
431972	2008 UX_{141}	—	November 15, 2003	Kitt Peak	Spacewatch	·	1.4 km	MPC · JPL
431973	2008 UO_{142}	—	October 23, 2008	Kitt Peak	Spacewatch	KOR	1.4 km	MPC · JPL
431974	2008 UO_{150}	—	October 10, 2008	Kitt Peak	Spacewatch	EUN	1.4 km	MPC · JPL
431975	2008 UL_{152}	—	February 27, 2006	Kitt Peak	Spacewatch	·	1.6 km	MPC · JPL
431976	2008 UJ_{157}	—	October 23, 2008	Mount Lemmon	Mount Lemmon Survey	KOR	1.4 km	MPC · JPL
431977	2008 UR_{165}	—	October 24, 2008	Kitt Peak	Spacewatch	·	1.7 km	MPC · JPL
431978	2008 UC_{173}	—	October 2, 2008	Mount Lemmon	Mount Lemmon Survey	EUN	1.3 km	MPC · JPL
431979	2008 UB_{174}	—	September 23, 2008	Kitt Peak	Spacewatch	WIT	1.1 km	MPC · JPL
431980	2008 UM_{180}	—	October 24, 2008	Kitt Peak	Spacewatch	·	2.2 km	MPC · JPL
431981	2008 UV_{185}	—	October 24, 2008	Kitt Peak	Spacewatch	·	2.1 km	MPC · JPL
431982	2008 UJ_{187}	—	October 24, 2008	Kitt Peak	Spacewatch	·	2.9 km	MPC · JPL
431983	2008 UC_{192}	—	October 7, 2008	Mount Lemmon	Mount Lemmon Survey	·	1.8 km	MPC · JPL
431984	2008 UK_{197}	—	October 27, 2008	Mount Lemmon	Mount Lemmon Survey	·	1.2 km	MPC · JPL
431985	2008 UG_{208}	—	October 23, 2008	Kitt Peak	Spacewatch	·	1.6 km	MPC · JPL
431986	2008 UN_{209}	—	October 23, 2008	Kitt Peak	Spacewatch	·	1.5 km	MPC · JPL
431987	2008 UR_{214}	—	October 1, 2008	Mount Lemmon	Mount Lemmon Survey	·	2.1 km	MPC · JPL
431988	2008 UX_{237}	—	October 26, 2008	Kitt Peak	Spacewatch	·	2.1 km	MPC · JPL
431989	2008 UE_{251}	—	October 27, 2008	Kitt Peak	Spacewatch	·	1.6 km	MPC · JPL
431990	2008 UM_{251}	—	October 27, 2008	Kitt Peak	Spacewatch	·	1.8 km	MPC · JPL
431991	2008 UN_{253}	—	October 27, 2008	Kitt Peak	Spacewatch	NEM	2.2 km	MPC · JPL
431992	2008 UX_{256}	—	October 27, 2008	Kitt Peak	Spacewatch	BRA	1.4 km	MPC · JPL
431993	2008 UV_{265}	—	October 9, 2008	Kitt Peak	Spacewatch	·	2.0 km	MPC · JPL
431994	2008 UF_{268}	—	October 28, 2008	Kitt Peak	Spacewatch	·	1.8 km	MPC · JPL
431995	2008 UC_{276}	—	October 28, 2008	Mount Lemmon	Mount Lemmon Survey	KOR	1.3 km	MPC · JPL
431996	2008 UQ_{278}	—	October 20, 2008	Kitt Peak	Spacewatch	·	1.7 km	MPC · JPL
431997	2008 UD_{284}	—	September 29, 2008	Kitt Peak	Spacewatch	·	1.6 km	MPC · JPL
431998	2008 UU_{284}	—	October 20, 2008	Kitt Peak	Spacewatch	EUN	1.2 km	MPC · JPL
431999	2008 UA_{294}	—	October 29, 2008	Kitt Peak	Spacewatch	·	2.0 km	MPC · JPL
432000	2008 UT_{302}	—	October 29, 2008	Kitt Peak	Spacewatch	·	1.6 km	MPC · JPL

back to top

== Meaning of names ==
As minor planet discoveries are confirmed, they are given a permanent number by the IAU's Minor Planet Center (MPC), and the discoverers can then submit names for them, following the IAU's naming conventions. The list below concerns those minor planets in the specified number-range that have received names, and explains the meanings of those names.

Official naming citations of newly named small Solar System bodies are approved and published in a bulletin by IAU's Working Group for Small Bodies Nomenclature (WGSBN). Before May 2021, citations were published in MPC's Minor Planet Circulars for many decades. Recent citations can also be found on the JPL Small-Body Database (SBDB). Until his death in 2016, German astronomer Lutz D. Schmadel compiled these citations into the Dictionary of Minor Planet Names (DMP) and regularly updated the collection.

Based on Paul Herget's The Names of the Minor Planets, Schmadel also researched the unclear origin of numerous asteroids, most of which had been named prior to World War II. This article incorporates text from this source, which is in the public domain: SBDB New namings may only be added to this list below after official publication as the preannouncement of names is condemned. The WGSBN publishes a comprehensive guideline for the naming rules of non-cometary small Solar System bodies.

Named minor planet	Provisional	This minor planet was named for...	Ref · Catalog
431397 Carolinregina	2007 GD_{6}	Carolin Regina Hormuth (born 1985, née Schnupp) studied stellar and substellar companions around exoplanet host stars at Heidelberg University, and wife of German discoverer Felix Hormuth	JPL · 431397
431436 Gahberg	2007 QJ_{3}	Gahberg, an 864-meter high mountain close to the Alps, located near Weyregg on Lake Attersee in Austria	JPL · 431436
431803 Šventoji	2008 QL_{40}	The Šventoji is the longest river that flows entirely within Lithuania and the largest tributary of the Neris. It originates from Lake Samanis in the Gražutė Regional Park and flows through Anykščiai, Kavarskas and Ukmergė into the Neris near the town of Jonava.	IAU · 431803
