= List of schools in Lithuania =

The following is a partial list of gymnasiums in Lithuania.

== Kaunas County ==
- Kėdainiai Atžalynas Gymnasium, Kėdainiai

=== Jonava ===
- Jonava Jeronimas Ralys Gymnasium
- Jonava Lietava Comprehensive School
- Jonava Senamiestis Gymnasium

=== Kaunas ===
- Gymnasium of Lithuanian University of Health Sciences
- Kaunas Jesuit Gymnasium
- Kaunas Maironis University Gymnasium
- Kaunas University of Technology Gymnasium

== Klaipėda County ==
- Klaipėda Varpas Gymnasium, Klaipėda
- Kretinga Jurgis Pabrėža University Gymnasium, Kretinga

== Marijampolė County ==
- Marijampolė Gymnasium, Marijampolė

== Panevėžys County ==
- Juozas Balčikonis Gymnasium, Panevėžys

== Šiauliai County ==
=== Šiauliai ===
- Šiauliai Julius Janonis Gymnasium
- Šiauliai Saulius Sondeckis Gymnasium of Arts

== Tauragė County ==
- Kaltinėnai Aleksandras Stulginskis Gymnasium, Kaltinėnai

== Telšiai County ==
- Židikai Marija Pečkauskaitė secondary school, Židikai

== Utena County ==
=== Ignalina ===
- Ignalina Česlovas Kudaba Gymnasium
- Ignalina Česlovas Kudaba Progymnasium

== Vilnius County ==
=== Vilnius ===
- National M. K. Čiurlionis School of Art
- Vilnius International French Lyceum
- Vilnius International School
- Vilnius Jesuit High School
- Vilniaus lietuvių namai
- Vilnius Lyceum
- Vilnius Minties Gymnasium
- Vilnius Vytautas Magnus Gymnasium
- Vilnius Žirmūnai Gymnasium
