= Krimer =

Krimer is a surname. Notable people with the surname include:

- Golde Gutman-Krimer (1906–1983), Yiddish writer
- Kseniia Krimer (born 1992), Russian water polo player
- Rostislav Krimer, Belarusian pianist and conductor
