= Ignalina Mikas Petrauskas Music School =

Coordinates: 55°20′35″N 26°9′38″E

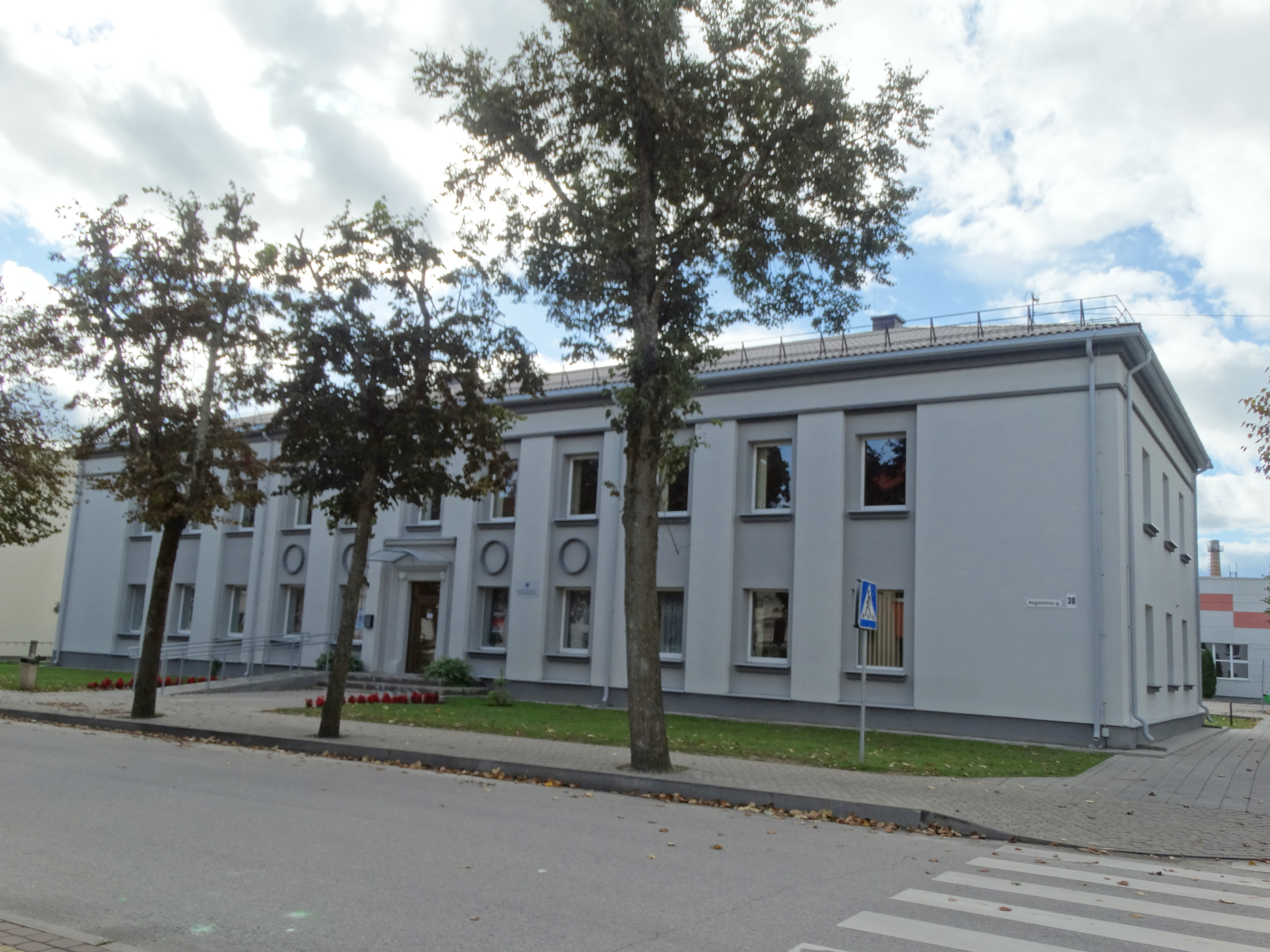
- School from city square

Location
- Atgimimo g. 30; Ignalina; Lithuania

Information
- Type: Music
- Opened: 1964
- Director: Birutė Paukštienė
- Student to teacher ratio: Students: 175. Teachers: 19.
- Hours in school day: 10
- Sports: No
- Website: http://muzika.ignalina.lm.lt

Ignalina Mikas Petrauskas Music School is a music school in Ignalina, Lithuania. The school is taught in Lithuanian. It is located on Atgimimo Street, and the institution code is 190243661. The school is named for the organist and chorister Mikas Petrauskas.

== History ==
The school was established in 1964. The piano and accordion section was intended to support 58 students.

In 1969, the school started a class in brass band. Students were taught to play the clarinet, trumpet, saxophone.

In 1978, the brass section had several hornpipe classes.

In 1979, the school established a string section (violin class) which in 1982 was supplemented by guitar, and in 1994, was supplemented by a zither class.

Since 1985, Ignalina operates a music school in the village of Didžiasalis.

A choral singing class was established in 1993.

Since 2008, the school has had a flute class.

14 February 2013 Ignalina district municipal council decided to rename the school in honor of Mikas Petrauskas.

In September 2015, the school had 175 enrolled students and 19 teaching staff.

== Directors ==
=== Dead ===
- 1964 − 1968 Leonas Vainila
- 1968 − 1988 Leonas Gylys (1928 − 1991)

=== Living ===
- 1988 − 2006 Benediktas Jasiulionis
- 2006 − present Birutė Paukštienė

== See also ==
- Ignalina
- Didžiasalis
- Ignalina Česlovas Kudaba Progymnasium
- Ignalina Česlovas Kudaba Gymnasium
