= Gavy =

Gavy may refer to:

- Gavys, a lake in eastern Lithuania
- Gavvy Cravath, an American athlete
- Gavy NJ, a South Korean musical trio
