= Didžiasalis (village) =

- Village
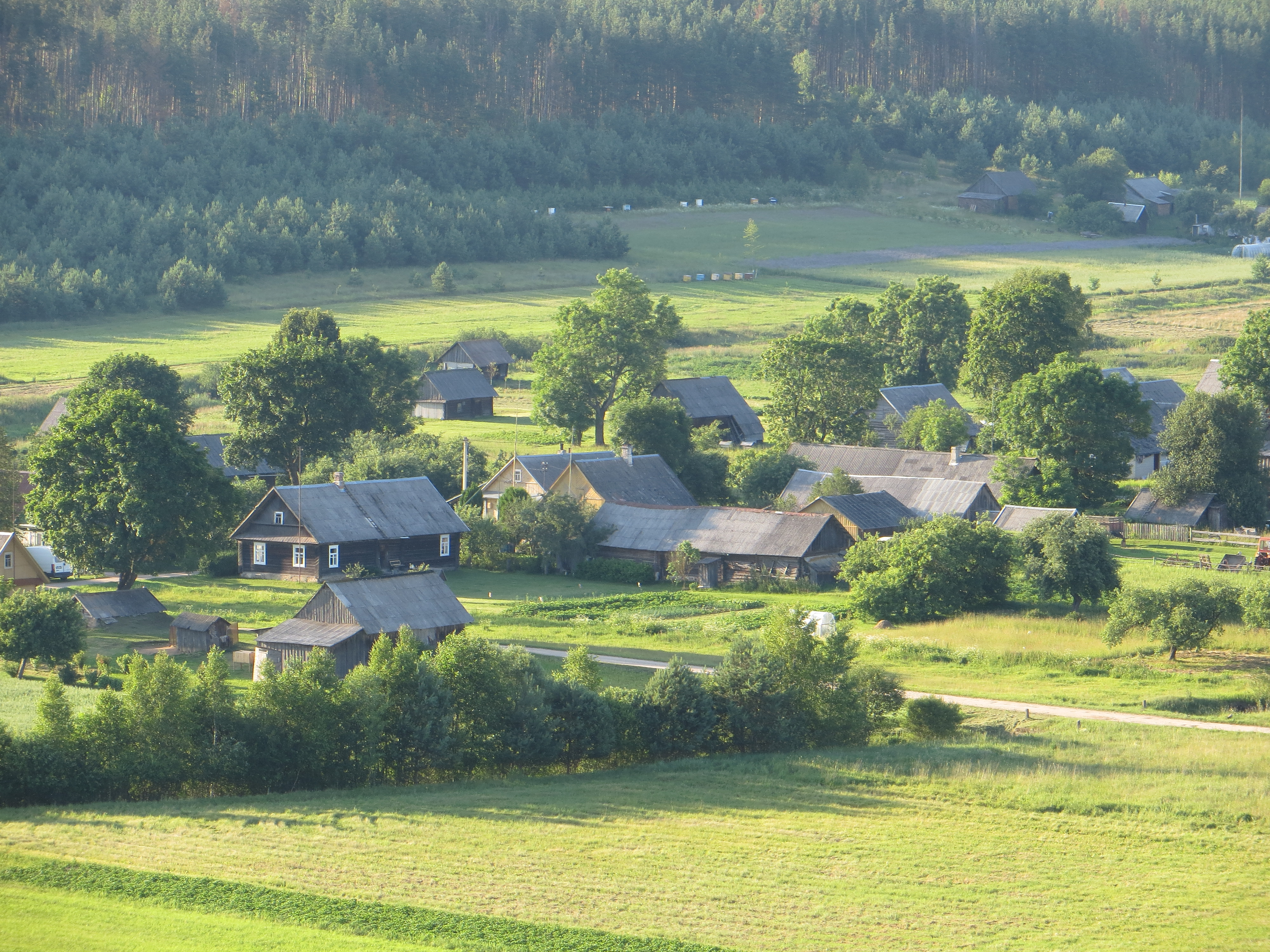
- Aerial view of old homesteads in Didžiasalis

- Location in Lithuania
- Coordinates: 55°14′10″N 26°11′06″E
- Country: Lithuania
- County: Utena County
- Municipality: Ignalina District Municipality
- Eldership: Ignalina eldership

Population (2011)
  - Total: 71
- Time zone: UTC+2 (EET)
  - Summer (DST): UTC+3 (EEST)

Didžiasalis is a linear village in the Ignalina eldership, Lithuania. It is located about 10 kilometres (6.2 mi) from Ignalina near the Ignalina–Švenčionys road. It is situated within the Sirvėta Regional Park. According to the 2011 census, it had 71 residents.

== History ==
Due to its archaic architecture, the village is an ethnocultural reserve, which includes 42 homesteads and 25 individually protected buildings. The village is situated along one street. Homesteads have irregular plans, some of which are located on both sides of the street. Houses are mostly double-ended; barns often have side barns; granaries have hip or half-hip roofs.
