= KTU =

KTU may refer to:

- APJ Abdul Kalam Technological University, India
- Korean Teachers & Education Workers' Union
- Key Telephone Unit
- KTU (band), Finnish-American
- Keilschrift Texte aus Ugarit, reference for Ugarit cuneiform texts
- KTU Gimnazija
- Kwu Tung station, Hong Kong (MTR station code KTU)

Universities known by the initials KTU include:

- Koforidua Technical University
- Karadeniz Technical University (KTÜ), Turkey
- Kaunas University of Technology (Kauno Technologijos Universitetas), Lithuania

== See also ==
- WKTU, a New York City radio station
