= Rostislav Krimer =

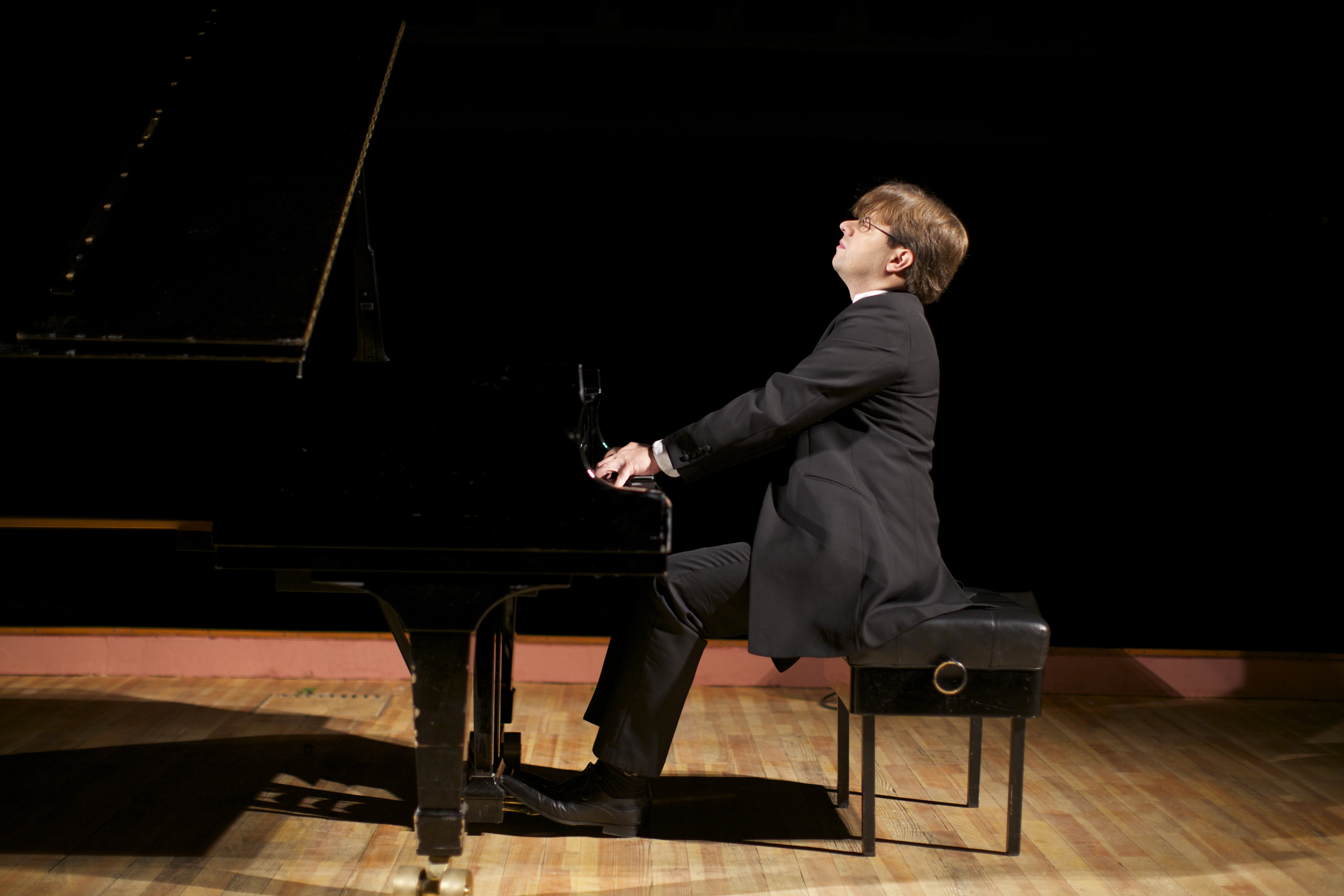
- Rostislav Krimer on stage at a concert

Background information
- Genre: Classical
- Occupations: Pianist, Conductor
- Instrument: Piano

Rostislav Krimer is a classical pianist and conductor, chief conductor and artistic director of the East-West Chamber Orchestra. Intendant and artistic director of the East-West-Festival, Friend of UNICEF and Star Ambassador of the 2nd European Games. He was also founder, general and artistic director of the Yuri Bashmet International Music Festival & Academy.

== Early life ==
After studying at the Sibelius Academy in Helsinki and at the Musikhochschule in Cologne, he earned his postgraduate diploma and was awarded the Diploma of the Royal Academy of Music at the Royal Academy of Music in London. In 2020 he became an Associate of the Royal Academy of Music.

== Concert life ==
Krimer's first London performance was a recital in Cadogan Hall in 2006. The Musical Opinion Magazine wrote of the performance: "Rostislav Krimer knocked out his audience at the Cadogan Hall...He is a pianist of note: watch out for him".

He has performed with musicians and ensembles including Yuri Bashmet and Moscow Soloists, Gidon Kremer and Kremerata Baltica, Royal Philharmonic Orchestra, Maxim Vengerov, Fazil Say, Ian Bostridge, Mahler Chamber Orchestra at venues including the Berliner Philharmonie in Berlin, the Queen Elizabeth Hall in London, P.I.Tchaikovsky Hall in Moscow. He has played at festivals including the Aix-en-Provence Festival in France, the Beethovenfest in Bonn, the Lockenhaus Chamber Music Festival, George Enescu Festival and the Ljubljana Summer Festival.

Krimer is the founder, general and artistic director of the annual Yuri Bashmet International Music Festival, which has been held in Minsk, Belarus as well as other cities internationally since 2006 more than 15 years.

He performed at the 2014 Sochi Winter Olympic Games ‘Stars of the 21st Century’ concert along with Kronberg Academy Festival artists.

He was playing concertos and recitals for more than ten years in duo regularly with the pianist Paul Badura-Skoda as well as recorded a Mozart double concerto for ERP-Classics. It was the latest CD of Paul Badura-Skoda. Rostislav Krimer plays in a duo with violinist Sergey Krylov.

Krimer closely worked together with composer Krzysztof Penderecki and performed his piano concerto. In 2018 Rostislav Krimer together with Nils Mönkemeyer performed a premiere of new founded piece of Dmitry Shostakovich at the Shostakovich music festival in Gohrisch, Germany.

The series of Meczyslaw Weinberg 4 Chamber Symphonies released by Naxos gathered great reviews and 5 stars ratings all over the world including BBC Music Magazine, Gramophone, Classics Today, nominated for most prestigious awards such as ICMA and Opus Klassik as well as became CD of the Month by MusicWeb and CD of the Week by Norman Lebrecht.

Since 2022 he is Intendant and Artistic Director of the East-West-Festival in Germany, which gathers artists from the East and West with the Moto "We Build Bridges".

== The Orchestra-For-Peace East-West Chamber Orchestra ==
The Orchestra-For-Peace East-West Chamber Orchestra brings together lauretates of the Tchaikovsky, ARD, Queen Elisabeth, Long-Thibaud as well as concertmasters and leaders of orchestras like Royal Philharmonic Orchestra or Kremerata Baltica playing rare instruments such as Stradivarius, Guarneri del Gesù, Guadagnini, and Goffriller.

The orchestra is based in the City of Beethoven - Bonn, Germany, and was founded by Rostislav Krimer in 2015. It has also been the resident orchestra of the Yuri Bashmet International Music Festival and has performed across Europe. The orchestra sees itself as an ambassador for transnational cooperation, peace, and cultural exchange throughout Europe and beyond. Since 2023, it has also become the orchestra-in-residence at the East-West-Festival in Germany.

== Premieres ==
- 2005, Rome — "Blue Girl with Red Wagon" piano quintet by Bruno Mantovani, performed jointly with Diemut Poppen, Antonello Manacorda, Gregory Ahss and Zvi Orlianski.
- 2010, Lochenhaus — "Canticle of the Sun" by Sofia Gubaidulina, performed jointly with Gidon Kremer, the chamber ensemble 'Kremerata Baltica' Nicolas Altstaedt, Andrei Pushkarev, and the choir "Kamär."[5]. In 2012, ECM released a recording of this concert performance.
- 2010, Alexander Raskatov „Seasons Digest“ für Violin, Piano and String Orchestra. Gidon Kremer, Violine, Rostislav Krimer, Klavier Kremerata Baltica. Berliner Philharmonie (Premiere in Germany)
- 2013 — "Ars Aeterna" for piano by Valery Voronov, dedicated to Rostislav Krimer, at the Emila Romagna Festival in Italy.
- 2015 Sergio Calligaris Concert for violin, piano and orchestra. Premiere by Sergej Krylov, Rostislav Krimer and Lithianian Chamber Orchestra, Vilnius
- 2015 Alla Pavlova „Concertino“ for violin, piano and orchestra . Premiere by Sergej Krylov, Rostislav Krimer and Lithianian Chamber Orchestra, Vilnius
- 2018 - Premiere of the discovered work by Dmitri Shostakovich, "Impromptu" for viola and piano, performed jointly with Nils Mönkemeyer at the International Shostakovich Days in Gorish (Germany).
- 2018 - World premiere. "Landscapes of Vanishing Memory" by Valery Voronov for viola, piano with strings, dedicated to Yuri Bashmet and Rostislav Krimer, performed jointly with Yuri Bashmet and the chamber ensemble "Moscow Soloists".
- 2021: George Enescu / Frédéric Chaslin's Sonata for Violin and Piano (arranged for string orchestra). Rostislav Krimer and the East-West Chamber Orchestra. European premiere at the Enescu Festival in Bucharest.
- 2022: Valery Voronov (student of Krzysztof Meyer, Germany) concert for violin, piano, and orchestra, dedicated to Rostislav Krimer and Sergei Krylov. Not yet premiered.
- 2023: George Enescu / Andrey Pushkarev's "Chamber Symphony" (arranged for string orchestra with vibraphone), commissioned by Rostislav Krimer and the East-West Chamber Orchestra for the George Enescu Festival.
- 2023: Erkki-Sven Tüür's "Leaving behind..." for piano and string orchestra, dedicated to Rostislav Krimer and the East-West Chamber Orchestra (Edition Peters).

== Awards ==
- Associate Royal Academy of Music
- Star Ambassador of the 2nd European Games (2019)
- Ernst & Young Award “ EY Entrepreneur of The Year” – Laureate
- International CSR Award “Philanthropy of the Year” – Laureate
- Laureate of the UNISA International Piano Competition, also Zara Jackson Prize for the best interpretation of F.Chopin
- 3 prize at the F.Chopin International Youth Piano Competition (Szafarnia, Poland, 1996)

== Philanthropic Work ==
- Rostislav Krimer is the Friend of UNICEF and Member of the Board of Friends of UNICEF
- 1994-2006 performed in hundreds of charity concerts in the Netherlands, the UK, Finland, and other countries for the Peace Fund. These concerts aimed to raise money for Chernobyl Children Rehabilitation Camps after the Chernobyl Disaster.
- In 2013, he organized and performed at a charity recital for children operations together with Maxim Vengerov. Minsk.
- In 2015, Krimer organized a charity event called '15 000 Chances for Life', and performed at the event along with the East-West Chamber Orchestra, the actor Konstantin Khabensky, and the soloists of the Bashmet Music Festival in Minsk. Over 60 thousand US dollars were raised to buy medicine for the Republican Scientific Practical Center for Pediatric Oncology and Hematology in Minsk.
- Since 2016, Krimer has worked closely with UNICEF, organizing the "Annual UNICEF Gala Dinner with Rostislav Krimer & Friends" to help children in need.
- In 2023, he also became a partner of Save the Children Germany.
