= Gymnasium Hankensbüttel =

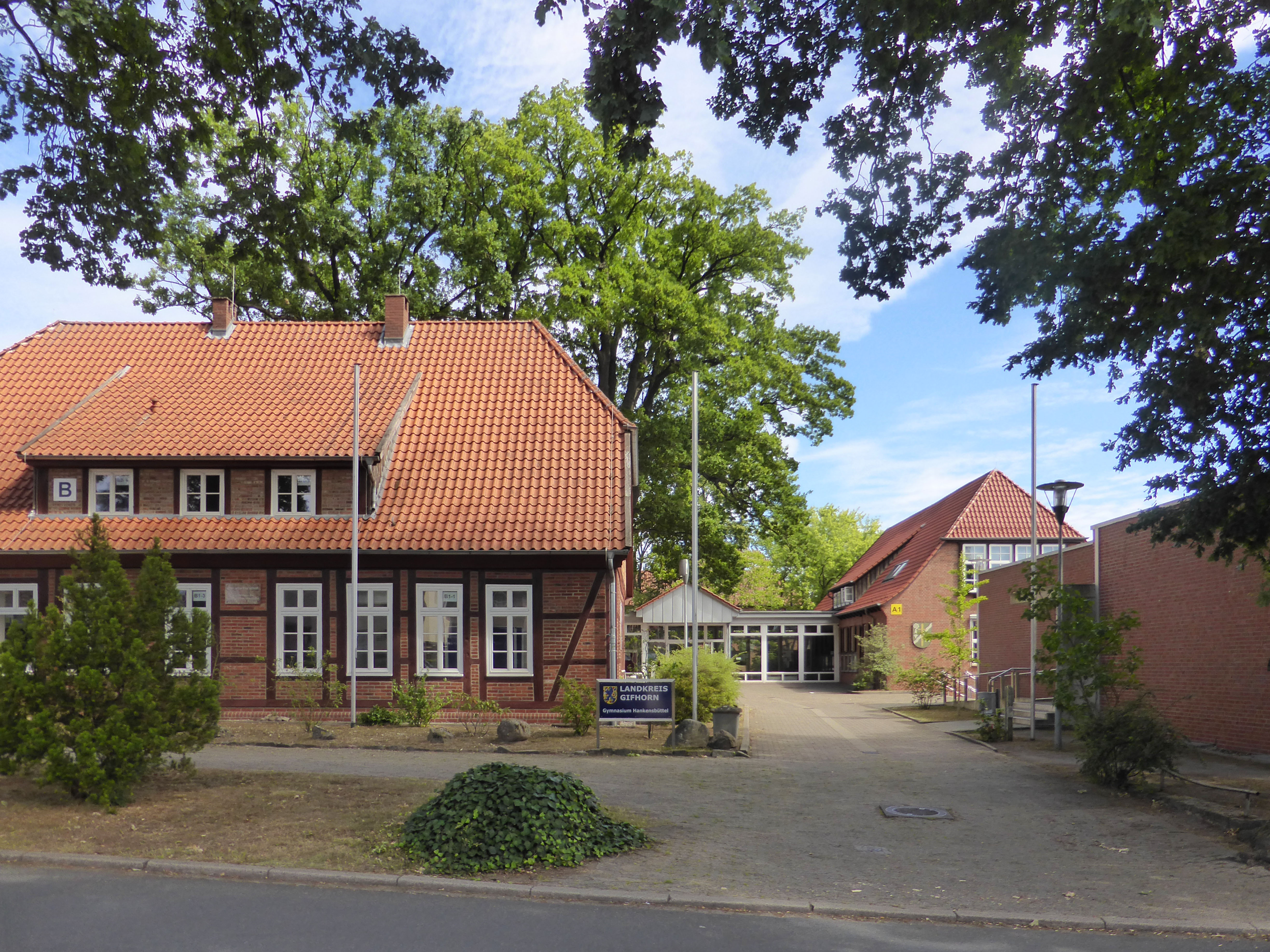
- Gymnasium Hankensbüttel

Location
- Amtsweg 11; 29386 Hankensbüttel, Lower Saxony; Germany
- Coordinates: 52°43′48″N 10°36′36″E

Information
- Type: Gymnasium
- Established: 1947
- School district: Gifhorn district
- Principal: Cornelia Röhrkasten
- Faculty: 88
- Grades: 5–13
- Enrollment: circa 1,000 (as of 2021)
- Information: 0049-58 32-98 40-10
- Website: https://gyhank.de/html/index.html

The Gymnasium Hankensbüttel is a Gymnasium in Hankensbüttel, Lower Saxony and the oldest one in the district of Gifhorn.

== History ==
The Gymnasium Hankensbüttel was first established in 1947 as a private high school. In May 1951 it was given the right to hold Mittlere Reife examinations. In the years 1953/54 the classes 12 and 13 were lectured for the first time. In 1954 the private school was acknowledged as a public school. The word Gymnasium has been used by the school since 1956. A trip was made to Wurmberg (Harz) to celebrate the school's 50th jubilee in 1997.

Gymnasium Hankensbüttel is a campus school with multiple buildings spread across its green campus. After the abolishment of the middle school grades 5 and 6 as a separate school, the campus has been expanded further allowing newer building to merge with the old. A modern cafeteria and aula was built and joins 'Fachwerk' buildings giving the school a specific charm. In 2021, approximately 1,000 students were enrolled and circa 85 teachers on staff.

== Success in sports ==
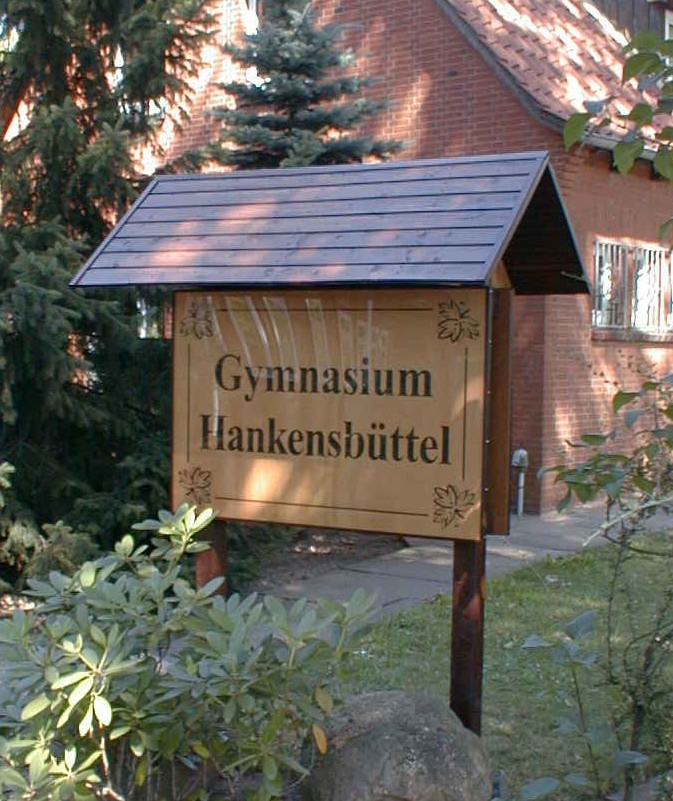
Sign at the entry of the Gymnasium

- 1987: German championship of the chess team (7th and 8th grade) in Altensteig
- 1989: German championship of the girls' handball team in the 3rd competitions class in (Berlin)
- 2003: Lower Saxony championship of the quad scull mixed rowing team in (Hannover)
- 2004: Lower Saxony championship of the quad scull rowing team in (Hannover)
- 2004: Lower Saxony championship of the girls' tennis team in (Melle)
- 2006: German championship of the quad scull rowing team in Berlin
- 2008: Lower Saxony championship of the girls' tennis team in Helmstedt

== Headmasters ==
- Willy Ernst (1947–1968)
- Dietrich Korn (1968–1997)
- Ulf Bartkowiak (1997–2010)
- Martin Hille (2010-2011)
- Cornelia Röhrkasten (since 2011)

== Well known pupils ==
- Hans Pleschinski (born 1956), author
- Astrid Frohloff (born 1962), journalist and television presenter
- Bernd Fix (born 1962), computer security expert
- Oliver Graf (born 1981), actor and cultural manager

== Twinning schools ==
- Senior High School, Clintonville, Wisconsin, United States
- Collège „Philippe de Champaigne“, Le Mesnil-Saint-Denis, France
- Kaltinėnai Aleksandras Stulginskis Gymnasium, Lithuania
