= Vilnius Jesuit High School =

- Lithuanian: Vilniaus jėzuitų gimnazija

Location
- Vilnius; Lithuania; 54°40′42″N 25°17′22″E

Information
- Type: Private gymnasium
- Religious affiliation: Catholicism
- Denomination: Jesuits
- Established: 1570; 456 years ago
- Principal: Edita Šičaitė, SSC
- Staff: 59
- Grades: 1 through 12
- Enrollment: 716
- Language: Lithuanian; German; English
- Affiliation: German Foreign Office
- Website: www.vjg.lt

Vilnius Jesuit High School (Lithuanian: Vilniaus jėzuitų gimnazija) is a private Catholic gymnasium, located in Vilnius, Lithuania. Founded in 1570 by members of the Jesuit order, the school provides an education from grades 1 through to grade 12. They also have preschool classes. The school is considered to be one of the most renowned schools in Lithuania and is aided by the German Federal Foreign Office.

== History ==
Vilnius Jesuit High School could be one of the oldest schools in Lithuania, if the current school is considered the successor to the Jesuit Collegium which was turned into Vilnius University during the confrontation between Lithuanian Protestants and Lithuanian Catholics during the Reformation period.

Collegium Vilnense Societati Jesu was established in 1570, with the first rector, Stanisław Warszewicki, S.J., teaching logic, mathematics, theology, and Hebrew. After the suppression of the Society of Jesus in 1773, the school did not reopen until 1921 with 135 boys. By 1938 there were 580 in the gymnasium. Disrupted in 1939 during the Soviet occupation, the school was reopened in its present status only in 1995 with 336 students and 54 teachers, classes 5 through 11. Lithuanian, German, and English were taught. In 1999 it received the humanities gymnasium status.

== Directors ==
- Fr. Antanas Gražulis, S.J.
- Faust Meškuotis
- Br. Virgilijus Saulius, S.J.
- Fr. Arthur Sederevičius, S.J.
- Edita Sičaitė, SSC

== See also ==
- Kaunas Jesuit Gymnasium
- List of schools in Lithuania
- List of Jesuit schools
