= Sergei Krylov (violinist) =

Italian musician

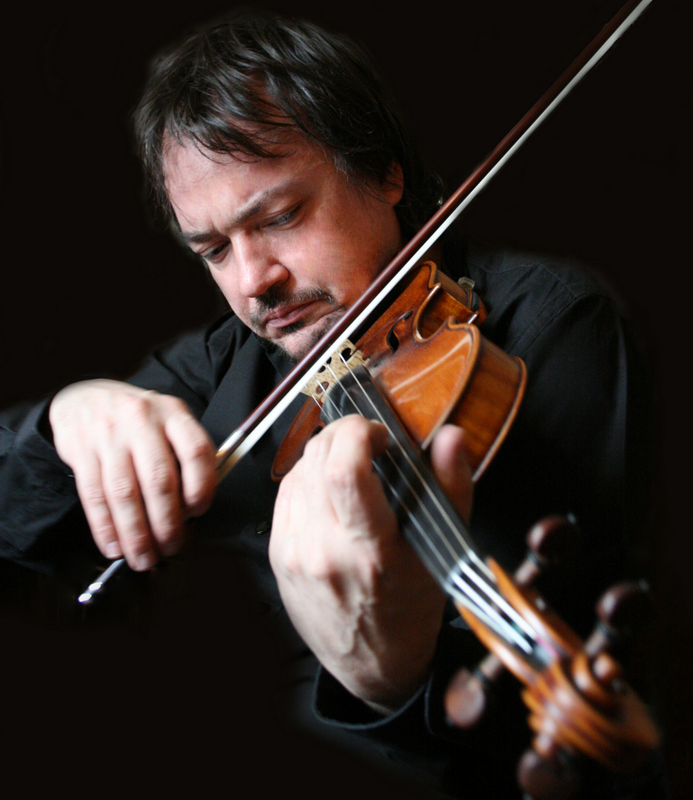
Sergei Krylov

Sergei Alexandrovich Krylov (Russian: Сергей Александрович Крылов; born 1970) is a Russian and Italian violinist and conductor.

== Biography and Art ==
Sergej Krylov was born in Moscow in a family of musicians. His father Alexander Krylov was an outstanding violin maker. His mother Liudmila Krylova is a famous piano player and a teacher.

At the age of 5 Sergej Krylov began violin lessons. In a year he performed his first concert. At the age of 10 he was already a student of Sergey Kravchenko and Abram Shtern at the Central Music School at the Tchaikovsky Moscow State Conservatory and made his orchestra debut and started to perform in Russia, China, Poland, Finland and Germany. At the age of 16 he recorded a disc together with the Lithuanian Chamber Orchestra conducted by Saulius Sondeckis with the recording company Melodiya.

At the age of 18 Krylov won first prize at the Rodolfo Lipizer International Violin Competition in Gorizia (Italy); аfter that, he enrolled in Salvatore Accardo's class in The Walter Stauffer Academy in Cremona. The young musician gained considerable publicity after winning first prize in the Antonio Stradivari Competition in Cremona and first prize at the prestigious Fritz Kreisler competition in Vienna.

Sergej Krylov has performed on the stages of the Berlin and the Munich Philharmonic Halls, in the Musikverein and the Konzerthaus in Vienna, in the Théâtre des Champs-Elysées and the Salle Pleyel in Paris, in the Megaron in Athens, in the Bozar in Brussels, in the Suntory Hall in Tokyo, in Teatro Colon in Buenos Aires, in the China National Concert Hall in Beijing, in Teatrola Fenice in Venezia, in La Scala Theatre in Milan, in the Great Hall of Moscow Conservatory, in the Concert Hall named after Tchaikovsky (the Moscow Philharmonic Society) and in the Grand Hall of the Saint Petersburg Philharmonic Society named after Shostakovich.

He performs with world-famous orchestras such as the Vienna Symphony Orchestra, the English Chamber Orchestra, the Symphony Orchestra of Saint Petersburg Philharmonic, the Mariinsky Theatre Symphony Orchestra, the Russian National Orchestra, Camerata Salzburg, the Chamber Orchestra “Moscow Soloists”, the Dresden Staatskapelle Symphony Orchestra, the State symphony orchestra “Novaya Rossiya”, the Atlanta Symphony Orchestra, the Tokyo Symphony Orchestra, the Beijing Symphony Orchestra, Hessischer Rundfunk, the Deutsche Radio Philharmonic, the Giuseppe Verdi Orchestra in Milan, Filarmonica Toscanini, the Hamburg State Philharmonic Orchestra, the Copenhagen Philharmonic Orchestra etc.

Among the most significant personalities Krylov has collaborated with, Mstislav Rostropovich is specially worth mentioning. He wrote: “Sergej Krylov is one of the top five contemporary violinists”.

Sergej Krylov has also collaborated with such conductors as Yuri Temirkanov, Valery Gergiev, Vladislav Czarnecki, Vladimir Ashkenazy, Dmitry Kitaenko, Mikhail Pletnev, Omer Welber, Andrey Boreiko, Yutaka Sado, Zoltán Kocsis, Dmitry Liss, Vladimir Yurovsky and Yury Bashmet.

Yefim Bronfman, Elina Garanca, Yury Bashmet, Denis Matsuev, Itamar Golan, Alexander Knyazev, Bruno Canino, Mischa Maisky, Nobuko Imai, Alexander Buzlov, Nikolai Lugansky, and many other outstanding musicians have been his chamber music partners. As the result of collaboration with Sting he recorded DVD “Twin Spirits”, dedicated to Robert Schumann.

Since 2008 Sergej Krylov has combined his solo career with the work of conductor. He is the Chief Conductor of the Lithuanian Chamber Orchestra. As a conductor he has collaborated with ensembles such as the English Chamber Orchestra, the Regionale Toscana symphony orchestra, the Accademia Orchestra Mozart chamber orchestra, the “Magna Grecia” symphony orchestra, the Orchestra del Teatro Lirico di Cagliari, the Novosibirsk Academic symphony orchestra and others.

Since 2012 he has been a Professor of the University of Music and Arts in Lugano, Switzerland.

== Awards and prizes ==
- 1989 - first prize in the Rodolfo Lipizer International Violin Competition in Gorizia (Italy).
- 1993 and 1997 – Chile Critics’ prize "The Best Foreign Performer of the Year" (Chile).
- 1998 - first prize in the Antonio Stradivari International Violinist Competition in Cremona (Italy).
- 2000 - first prize in the Fritz Kreisler Violinist competition in Vienna (Austria).
- 2000 – the Gold Medal "Viotti d'Oro" (Vercelli, Italy).
- 2003 – the "Torrone d'oro" award for musical arts achievements(Cremona, Italy).
- 2004 – the "Angelo dell'Anno" award for his contribution into the development of musical arts (Milan, Italy).
- 2005 – Silver Violin "Violino d'argento" (Cremona, Italy).
- 2005 – the order "Paul Harris Fellow" (Cremona, Italy).
- 2009 – the "Le Muse" award for outstanding achievements in the sphere of music culture(Musa Polimnia) (Florence, Italy).
