= Kaltinėnai Aleksandras Stulginskis Gymnasium =

Coordinates: 55°34′0″N 22°27′24″E

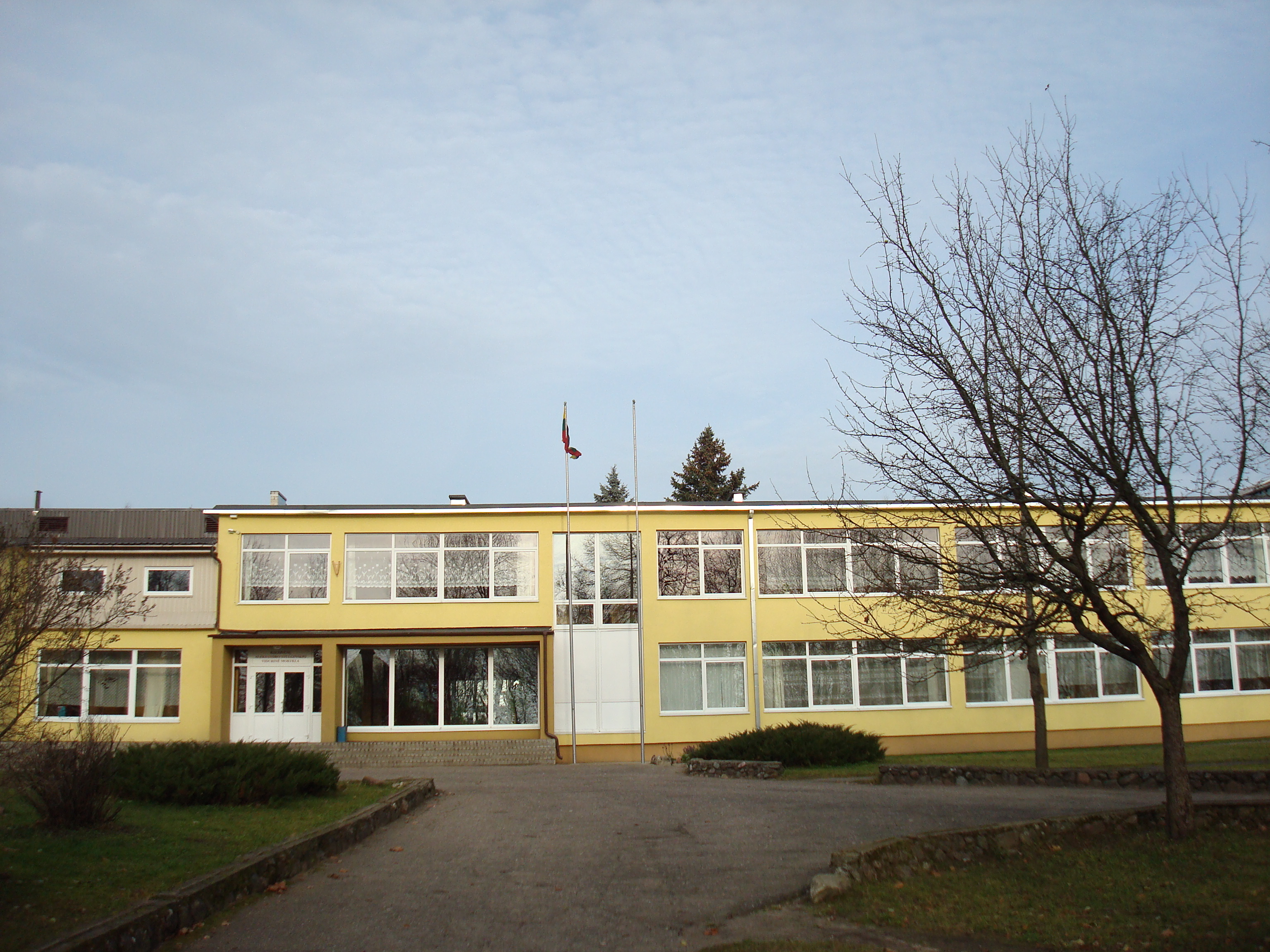
- 22 Varnių Str., Kaltinėnai, Šilalė district, Lithuania

Information
- Type: Public, Grades 5–12
- Established: 1777
- Headmaster: Virginijus Andrejauskas
- Employees: 51
- Enrollment: 511

Šilalė district Kaltinėnai Aleksandras Stulginskis Gymnasium is a day, public, co-educational school. It is located at 22 Varnių Str., Kaltinėnai, Šilalė district. It offers primary, basic, secondary and optional education programmes. Institution code 190329256.

Subsidiary:

- Iždonai Primary Education Department of Šilalė district Kaltinėnai Aleksandras Stulginskis Gymnasium.

== History ==
A parish school began to work in Kaltinėnai in 1777. Later there were four departments of primary school. In 1944 a pro-gymnasium was founded, which was reorganised into a 7 forms school 5 years later. In the autumn of 1951, when 8th and 9th forms were opened, it became secondary school. A new school building was built in 1967. Since 1992 the school exchanges students’ delegations with the German Gymnasium Hankensbüttel . In 1999, on December 20 the title of Aleksandras Stulginskis Secondary School was given to the school. In 2009, on January 29 the school became gymnasium. 440 students learned and 39 teachers worked in the school in 1999. There were 614 students in the Secondary school and 10 students in Iždonai Primary Education Department on September 1, 2005. 501 students and 10 students in Iždonai Department are learning during the school year 2008–2009.

== Traditions ==
The school has a lot of traditions which developed during its long history: First and Last Bells, Teacher day, European Day of Languages, Hundred-day, School day, February 16 and March 11 celebrations, Earth’s day, EU day and others. Various occasions take place on these days.

== Headmasters ==
- Antanas Sungaila (1984–1997)
- Virginijus Andrejauskas (from 1997 till now)

== Notable students ==
- Aleksandras Stulginskis, learnt at Kaltinėnai grammar school
- Jurgis Kairys, pilot
