= Kepaluškalnis =

Mount Kepaluškalnis
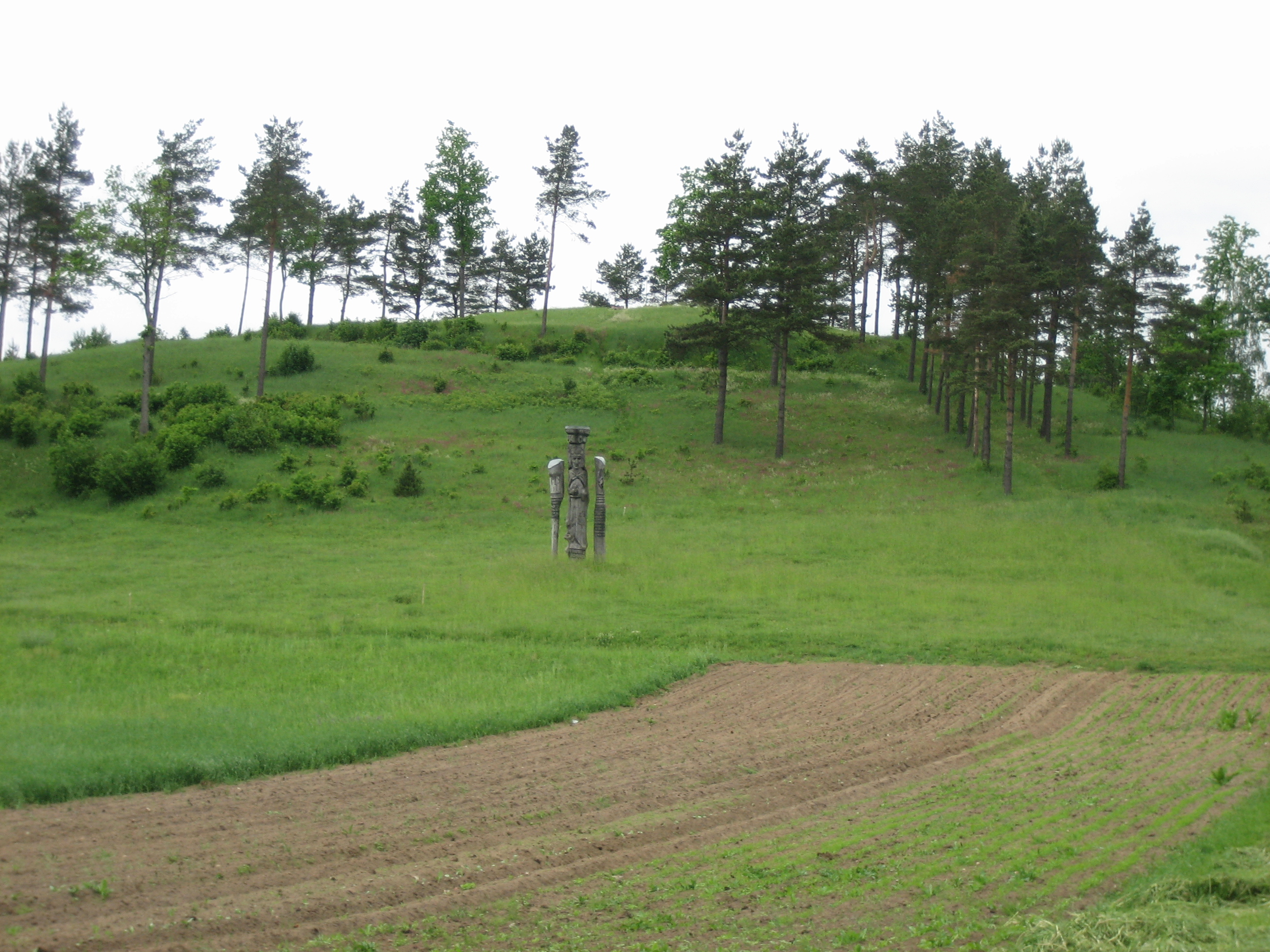

Highest point
- Elevation: 20 m (66 ft)
- Coordinates: 55°34′00.9″N 22°20′01.1″E

Geography
- Location: Kaltinėnai town, Šilalė district, Lithuania

Kepaluškalins (also known as Pilės or Kaltinėnai Mound) is a mound located in Šilalė district, Lithuania, close to Kaltinėnai town, in Pilės village. It is thought to be founded in the beginning of 2nd millennium AD. The size of the mound and the dimensions of its defence fortifications show that during the wars with Crusaders there was one of the strongest castles in Žemaitija and the centre of Kaltinėnai land defence as well as administration on Kepaluškalnis.

== Remains of fortifications ==
The mound was founded on the edge of a highland, on a point formed by two hollows. Its hillsides are precipitous, to 20m in height. A 45 x 50m size upper ground was surrounded by bulwarks which are flattened now. Spurs, stone projectiles and other finds have been found in this ground. The north side of the mound was fortified with even 5 bulwarks and moats, first 3 of which also encircled the eastern and western hillsides. There was also a moat in the southern hillside, and the bulwark behind it had a 2-metre-high outer side. Nowadays, these fortifications can be seen only in the south-western part of the mound, others are destroyed.

The mound was badly damaged by ploughing: most of the bulwarks and moats were flattened gradually. A homestead (now pulled down), located on the west side of the mound, also damaged the bulwarks. Cleaning works which took place in 2002-04 were especially harmful for the mound historically: a path of stones leading to the upper ground was paved through the northern fortifications, and a parking lot was built where the 5th moat had once been.

In 1990, J. Genys researched an area of 8,5m^{2} on the upper ground, but didn’t find any cultural layer.

== Monument ==
In 1990, a wooden monument for Vytautas the Great and the remembrance of Žalgiris battle was built at the foot of the mound. The place for this monument was chosen not accidentally. While fighting for power and after becoming the Grand Duke of Lithuania, Vytautas visited Žemaitija a lot of times. It is also very likeable that he has been to Kaltinėnai, which was one of the most important centres of Žemaitija in those times.

== Use of the mound nowadays ==
On the top of Kepaluškalnis, an altar of stones was built for the remembrance of castle protectors. Flags of Lithuania, Šilalė, and Tauragė often wave beside this altar. St John’s Day and other festivals are celebrated on this mound. Crowds of people gather there on these days, performances are given and bonfires are burnt.
