= Gavys =

Lake in Lithuania

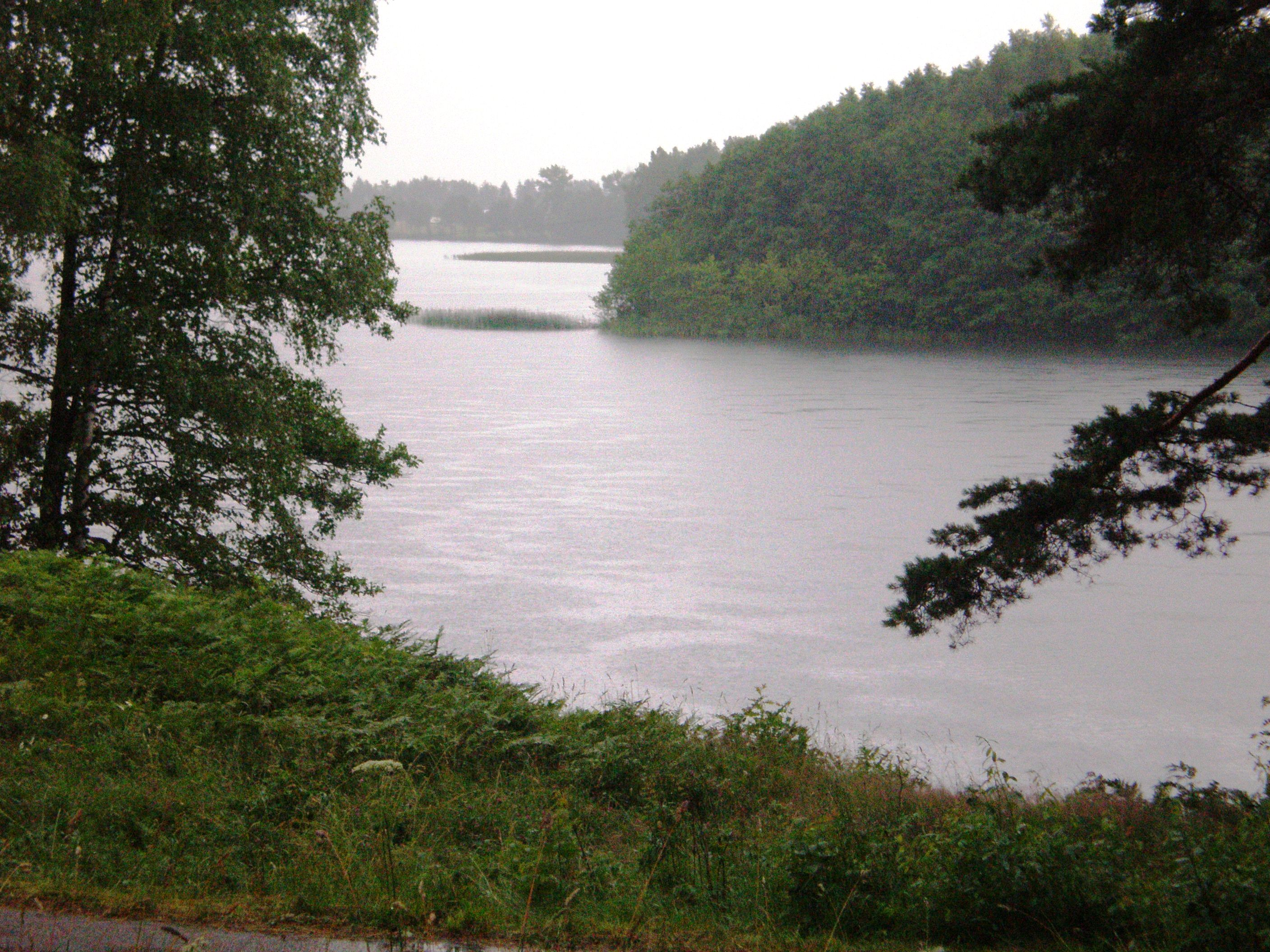
- Gavys from south Strigailiškis

- Location within Lithuania
- Location: Ignalina, Pagavė, Antagavė, Strigailiškis
- Coordinates: 55°19′49″N 26°8′51″E
- River sources: Nasrupė, Gavys creek
- Basin countries: Lithuania
- Max. length: 1.9 kilometres (1.2 mi)
- Average depth: 10.1 m (33 ft)
- Max. depth: 56 m (184 ft)
- Water volume: 1,243 km^{2} (480 sq mi)
- Islands: 3

Gavys - lake in eastern Lithuania, Ignalina district, about 2 km southwest of Ignalina. The western part of the lake edge Aukštaitija National Park. Gavys lake length 1.9 km, width 1.2 km. Depth up to 56 m.

Shores tall on the west forested. In the northern part of the bays and peninsulas. There are 3 small islands (total area of 2.3 ha). The lake bottom is covered mainly sapropel elsewhere - sludge. The sandbar is narrow, covered with gravel or sand.

To the streets in the north-east of the creek empties (duct) from Gavaitis lake and southwest of the creek flows Gavys creek (Nasrupė tributary) Water transparency of 4.6 to 11 m.

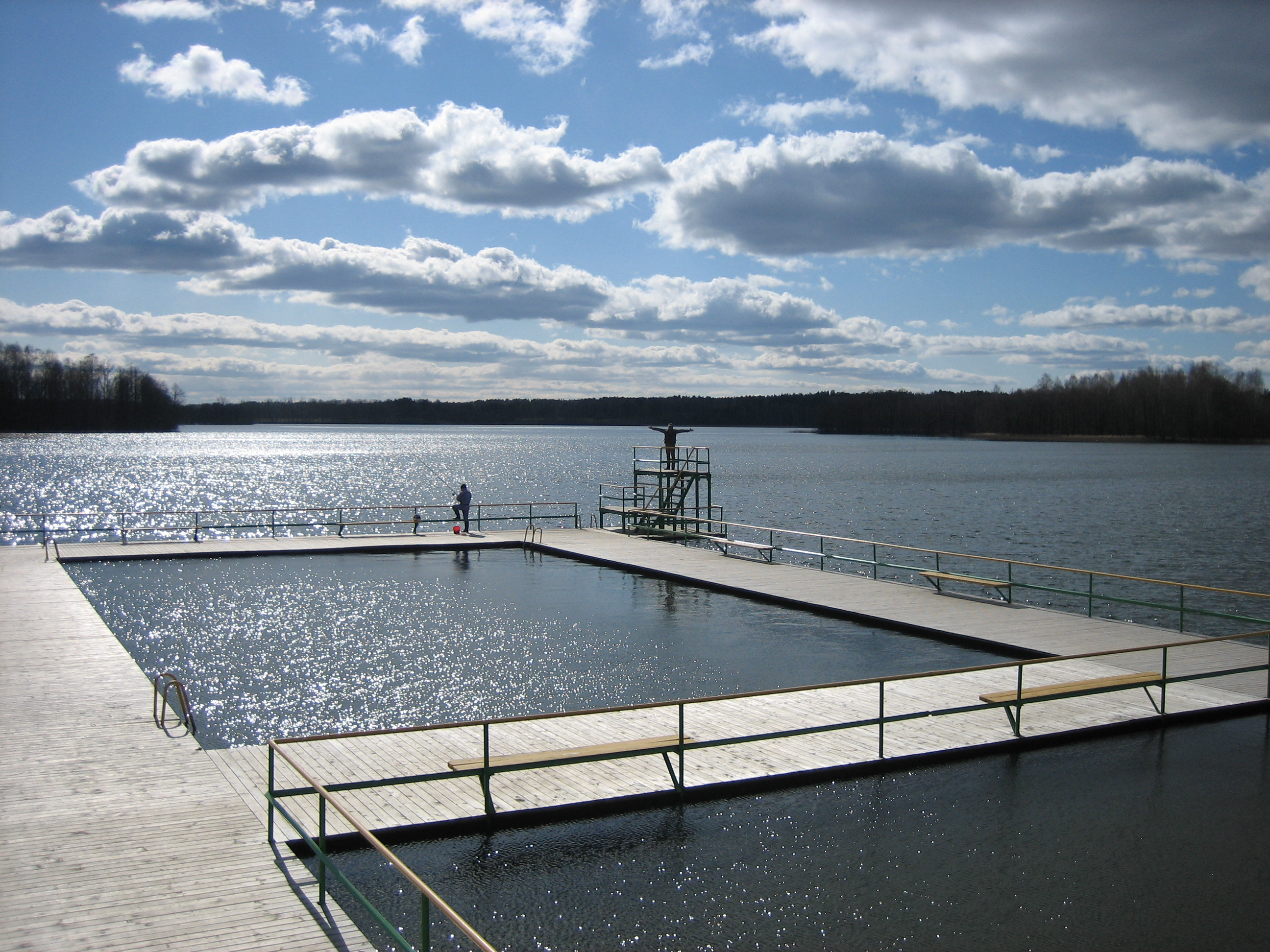
Gavys from Ignalina beach

Gavys the fish caught in the lake: pike fish, rope fishes, roaches, breams, crucian carps, perches, alburnus, ruffs, smelts, burbots, whitefishes (whitefishes breed)

Near Gavys villages: Pagavaitis, Pagavė, Antagavė, and Ignalina south purlieus.
