= Kretinga Jurgis Pabrėža University Gymnasium =

Kretinga Jurgis Pabreza University Gymnasium
- Kretingos Jurgio Pabrėžos Universitetinė Gimnazija

Location
- Savanorių st. 56; Kretinga, Lithuania, LT-97114
- Coordinates: 55°53′23″N 21°15′44″E

Information
- School type: University gymnasium
- Established: 1 September 1980
- Founder: Kretinga District Municipality
- School code: 190284291
- Principal: Asta Burbienė
- Teaching staff: 50
- Classes: 18
- Average class size: 26
- Student to teacher ratio: 9,5
- Classrooms: 70

The Kretinga Jurgis Pabrėža University Gymnasium (Lithuanian: Kretingos Jurgio Pabrėžos universitetinė gimnazija) is a gymnasium in Kretinga, Lithuania that provides primary, secondary, and supplementary education programs. The gymnasium cooperates with many Lithuanian universities.

== History ==
It was founded on 1 September 1980 as Third High School. Science and humanities classes were introduced between 1991 and 1992, and the humanities gained accreditation in 1993. The school adopted the Jurgis Pabrėža name on 30 May 1994. The Kretinga district municipality decided on 30 May 1997 that from September 1997 onwards, Jurgis Pabrėža High School would be reorganized as a gymnasium: Kretinga Jurgis Pabrėža Gymnasium.
