= Golde Gutman-Krimer =

- Born: January 26, 1906 Edineț, Bessarabia, Russian Empire
- Died: July 19, 1983 (aged 77) Buenos Aires, Argentina
- Language: Yiddish

Golde Gutman Krimer (January 26, 1906–July 19, 1983) was a Yiddish writer. She was born in Edineț in the Bessarabia region of the Russian Empire, in what is Moldova today. In the early 1920s, she migrated to Argentina. There she emerged as a Yiddish-language writer with her contributions to the Jewish papers Di Prese and Unzer Fraynt in Buenos Aires. She wrote over a dozen books, primarily novels and short stories. Although she lived for the last 60 years of her life in Argentina, her native Bessarabia continued to be a predominant theme in her works.

Some of her books have been translated into Spanish. She died in Buenos Aires in 1983.

== Publications ==
=== Novels ===
- Gutman, Golde (1948). Der muter Rokhl.
- Gutman, Golde (1966). A ḥolem fun a pasṭekhl. Buenos Aires.
