= Šiauliai Saulius Sondeckis Gymnasium of Arts =

Art school in Šiauliai, Lithuania

Coordinates: 55.9295°N 23.3156°E

- Šiaulių Sauliaus Sondeckio menų gimnazija
- Type: State gymnasium
- Established: 1 September 1939; 86 years ago
- Academic staff: 78
- Location: Šiauliai, Lithuania
- Website: sondeckis.lt

Šiauliai Saulius Sondeckis Gymnasium of Arts (Lithuanian: Šiaulių Sauliaus Sondeckio menų gimnazija) is a state art gymnasium located in Šiauliai, Lithuania.

== History ==
In 1939, after Nazi Germany had occupied the Klaipėda region, the Klaipėda music school was closed afterwards. This resulted in the establishment of Šiauliai music school in the same year. It was founded by a conductor, teacher and professor Juozas Karosas.

After the end of the Second World War, the school was known as Šiauliai music tekhnikum, and later known as Šiauliai music high school. In 1990, a new additional teaching department was created where various music education took place. In 2010, Šiauliai Conservatory was named after the famous Lithuanian conductor and professor Saulius Sondeckis. Later it was known as Šiauliai Saulius Sondeckis School of Arts (since 2011) and Šiauliai Saulius Sondeckis Gymnasium of Arts (since 2013).

Every year gymnasium accepts students to 9–12 grades. Since 2012 primary classes exist as well.

== Departments ==
There are 13 minor departments in the gymnasium with two of them providing general education:

- Accordion Department
- General Piano Department
- General Education Department
- General Music Theory Department
- Choir Conducting and Singing Department
- Fine Arts Department
- Piano Department
- Guitar Department
- Folk Instruments Department
- Primary Education Department
- Wind Instruments and Percussions Department
- String Instruments Department
- Additional General Piano Department
