= Lithuanian Chamber Orchestra =

The Lithuanian Chamber Orchestra (LCO) (Lithuanian: Lietuvos kamerinis orkestras (LKO)) is a chamber orchestra based in Vilnius, Lithuania. It was established by Saulius Sondeckis in 1960, giving its first performance on April 30, 1960. Along with the Lithuanian National Symphony Orchestra, the Čiurlionis Quartet, early music ensemble Musica Humana and the Vilnius String Quartet, the LCO is a resident group of the National Philharmonic Hall.

== About ==
The orchestra generally performs works of Lithuanian composers, and premiered works by Alfred Schnittke, Arvo Pärt and Pēteris Vasks. It is also said to have a "special affinity for the works of Bach and Mozart." Until 2004, the LCO was part of the Lithuanian National Philharmonic Society, but in that year, it gained independent status. Saulius Sondeckis served as Artistic Director and Chief Conductor from its inception in 1960 until 2004 and violinist Sergei Krylov was appointed in 2008. Yehudi Menuhin has conducted its choral-orchestral works.

The LCO was the first Lithuanian orchestra to make its debut in the West at the Echternach Festival in Luxembourg in 1976. The orchestra has toured most European countries, the USA, Japan, Argentina, Cuba, Canada, Egypt, and South Africa. It has performed at prestigious venues such as the Musikverein in Vienna, Royal Festival in London, Santa Cecilia in Rome, Auditorium di Milano in Milan, Concertgebouw in Amsterdam and many other famous concert halls and festivals in Europe. Joachim W. Hartnack in his book, Grosser Geiger unserer Zeit, has ranked the Lithuanian Chamber Orchestra as among "the three most masterly orchestras of the world". In 1976 the orchestra won the gold medal at the Herbert von Karajan Contest of Youth Orchestras in Berlin.
