= Vilnius Lyceum =

Coordinates: 54°42′44″N 25°16′44″E

Vilnius Lyceum Lithuanian: Vilniaus licėjus
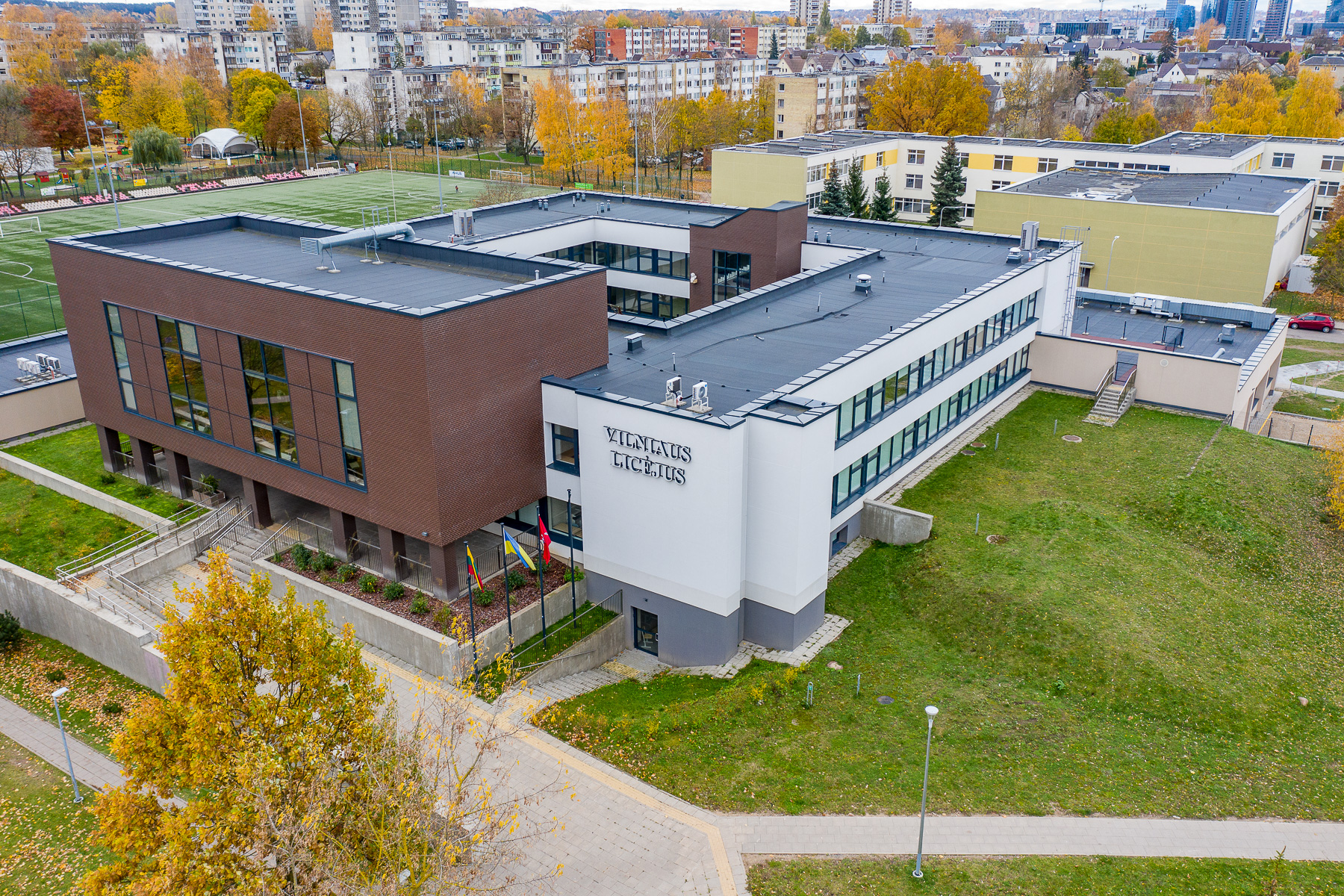

Location
- Širvintų str. 82; Vilnius; Lithuania

Information
- Type: Secondary day school, gymnasium
- Established: 1990
- Vice Principal: Jolita Milaknienė
- Principal: Saulius Jurkevičius
- Gender: Mixed
- Enrollment: 609 (2017)
- Campus: Urban
- Website: licejus.lt

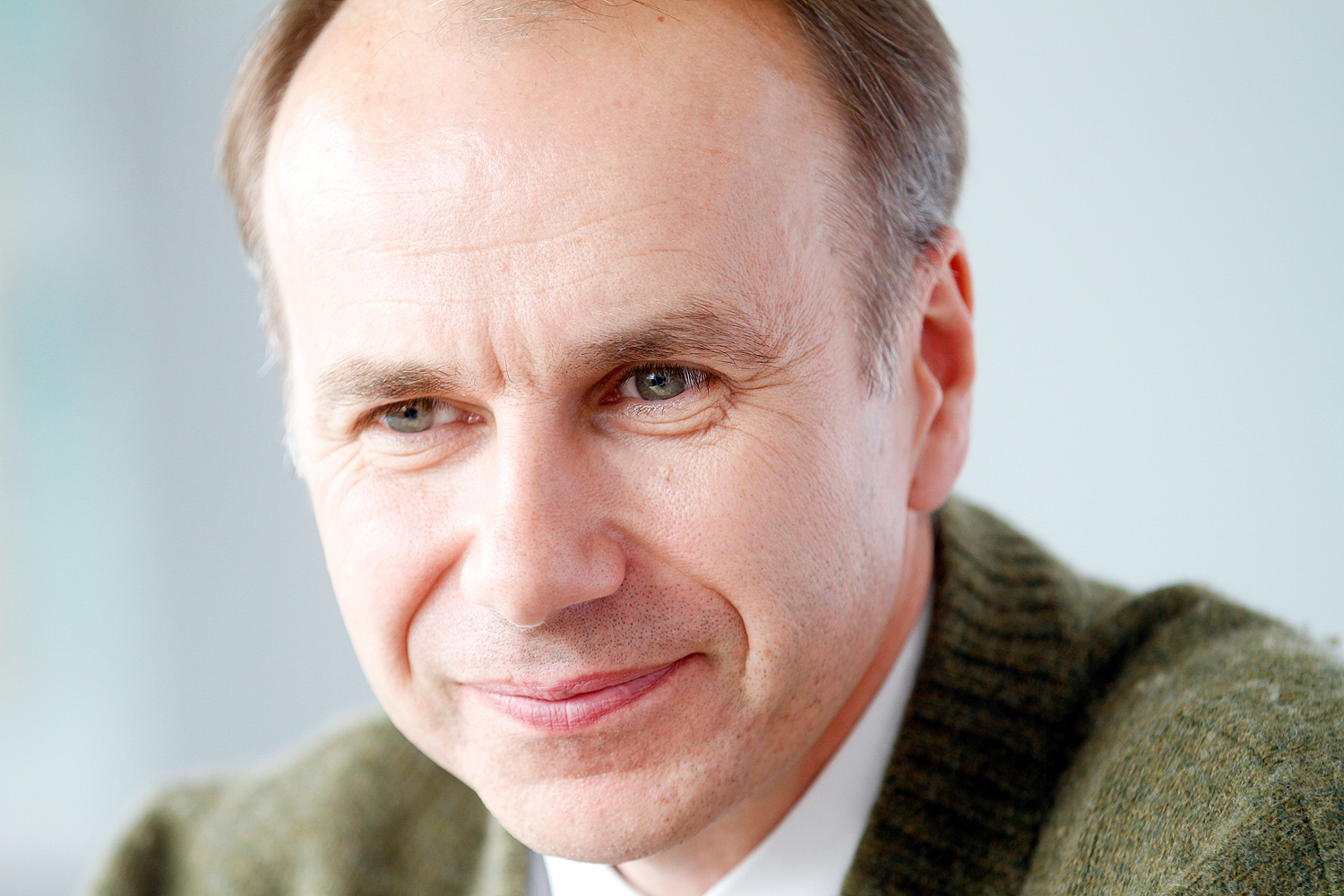
Principal Saulius Jurkevičius

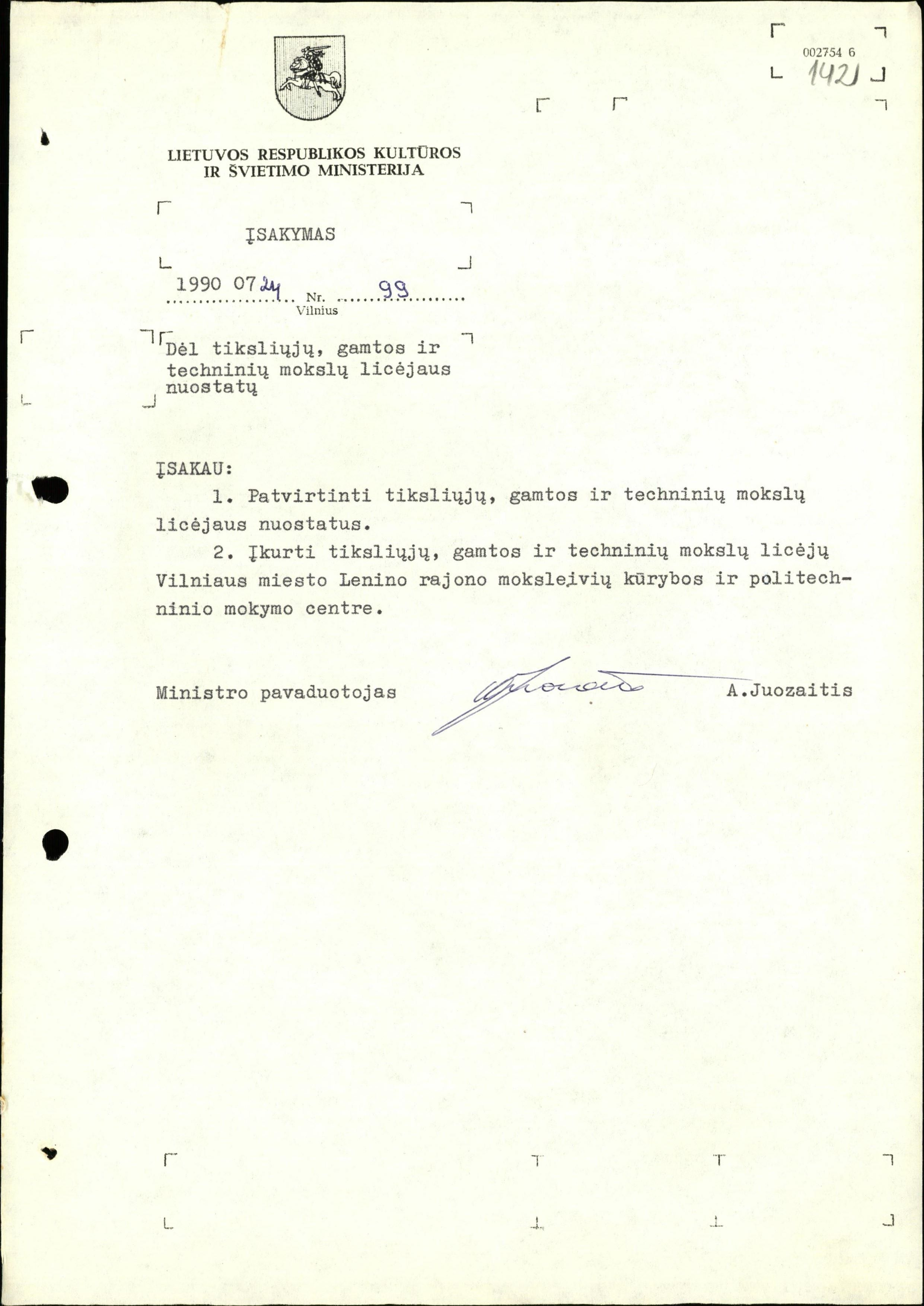
Order to establish a lyceum of exact, natural and technical sciences. Date: July 24, 1990. The custodian of the document: New State Archive of Lithuania.

Vilnius Lyceum (Lithuanian: Vilniaus licėjus) is a state gymnasium in Vilnius, Lithuania.

Founded in 1990, Vilnius Lyceum is a state coeducational day school enrolling students in Grades 9 to 12. The total number of students is 609, including 75 students in the International Baccalaureate section. Tuition is provided in both Lithuanian (national curriculum) and English (International Baccalaureate).

== History ==
An idea of a new type of school for the academically gifted children was conceived in 1990 and implemented in the Center of Students' Creativity and Polytechnical Education. Principal Jevgenijus Abramovas and vice-principal Birutė Bartaškaitė invited students who were interested in natural sciences and mathematics to Year 10 (Junior year). At that time, the students were selected based on their academic achievements from the previous year and a personal interview. Three small classes were formed after this process. The entrance exams were introduced in 1991. Lyceum became an independent school in 1992 and continued cherishing the free academic environment. Later, Vilnius Lyceum sought to become a gymnasium. In June 1995, Vilnius City Council made a decision to provide Lyceum with the permanent premises (Širvintų str. 82). In 2004, following the school's request and the approval of the Ministry of Education and Science, Vilnius City Council renamed Vilnius Lyceum of Exact, Natural and Technical Sciences to its current name of Vilnius Lyceum.

Vilnius Lyceum Alumni association was founded in 2007. Vilnius Lyceum Alumni Association UK charity was established in 2019 to bring together benevolent activities of the alumni of Vilnius Lyceum based in the United Kingdom. Vilnius Lyceum became an International Baccalaureate World School in May 1997.

== Admission ==
Competition for places at the Lyceum is high and admission is based entirely on student's academic merit, as measured by the admission examinations.

The admission exams to Grade 9 are as follows:

- Lithuanian language and literature (25 points)
- Mathematics (25 points)
- History (15 points)
- Physics (15 points)

The admission exams to the IB class are as follows:

- English language and literature (40 points)
- Mathematics (40 points)
- Students are given up to 10 extra points, which are calculated according to their academic results.

== Rankings and reputation ==
Vilnius Lyceum is regularly ranked within the top 2 high schools in Lithuania and is currently ranked first in Lithuania in the journal Reitingai.

== Principals ==
- from July 24, 1990 according to the regulations of the lyceum, the de jure head of the lyceum was the principal of the Center of Students’ Creativity and Polytechnical Education Jevgenijus Abramovas, however de facto the internal affairs of the lyceum were managed by vice-principal Birutė Bartaškaitė, and external affairs were managed by Giedrius Zlatkus;
- from August 24, 1992 Viktoras Filipavičius (on this day the lyceum separated from the Center of Students’ Creativity and Polytechnical Education and became an independent educational institution);
- from August 30, 1994 Saulius Jurkevičius (current).

== Notable alumni ==
- Eglė Bilevičiūtė, a lawyer
- Laimonas Markauskas, a lawyer
- Vytis Jurkonis, a political analyst and a lecturer at Vilnius University
- Unė Kaunaitė, a writer, public figure and the Adviser to the Prime Minister on education, science and culture
- Ignas Krupavičius, a journalist and a television presenter
- Linas Kukuraitis, a politician, former Minister of Social Security and Labour and the current Minister of Health
- Vaidotas Žala, rally and rally-raid champion
- Miglė Anušauskaitė, a writer and an artist
- Simas Čelutka, a political analyst, a writer and a lecturer at Vilnius University.

== See also ==
- Kaunas University of Technology Gymnasium
