= Klaipėda Varpas Gymnasium =

Coordinates: 55°40′02″N 21°12′19″E

Klaipėda "Varpas" Gymnasium
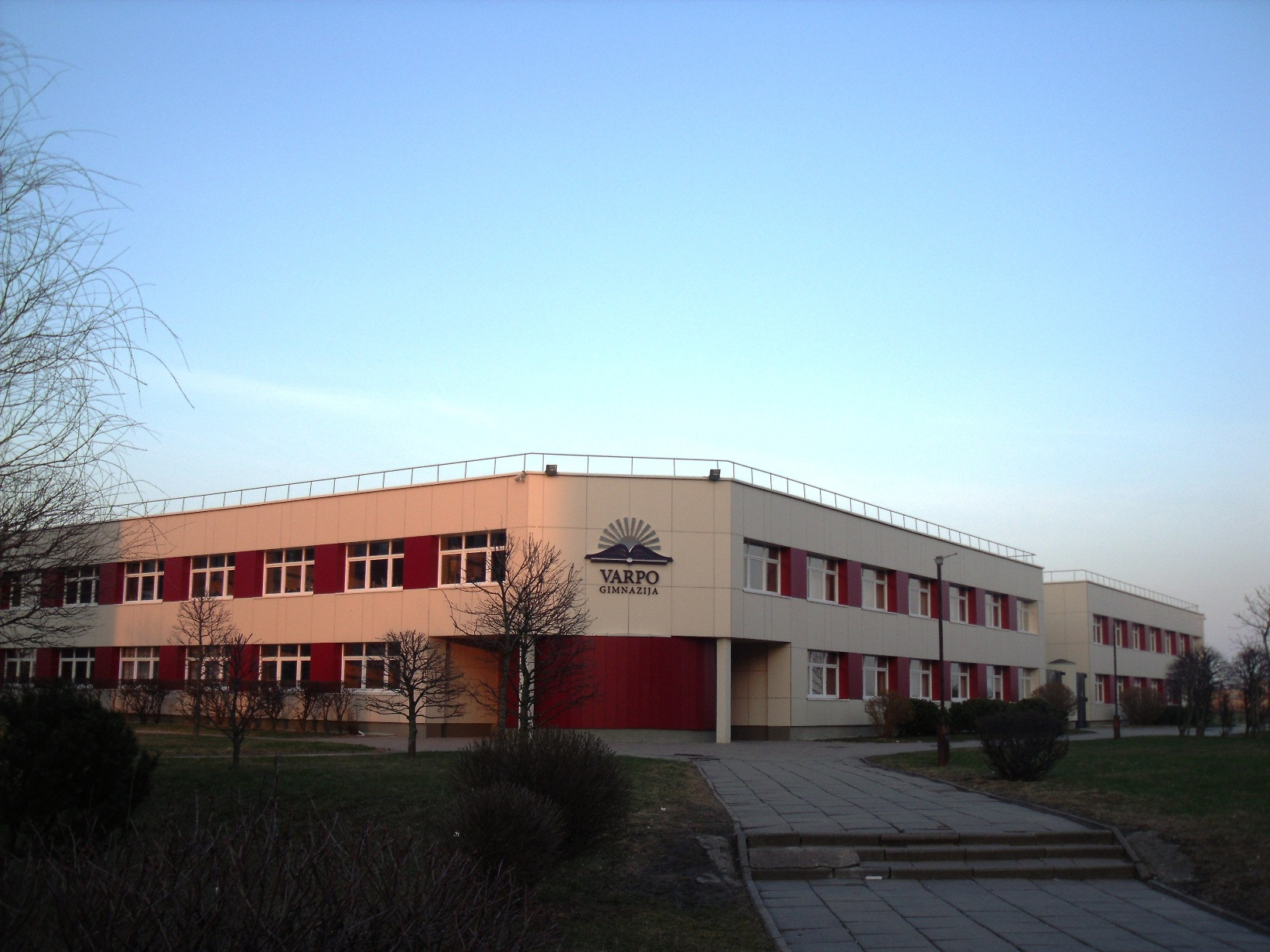

Location
- Budelkiemio g. 7 Klaipėda; Lithuania

Information
- Type: Gymnasium
- Established: 1989
- Principal: Vilma Bridikienė
- Grades: 9–12
- Website: varpogimnazija.lt

Klaipėda "Varpas" Gymnasium (Lithuanian: Klaipėdos "Varpo" gimnazija) is a Lithuanian language gymnasium school located in Bandužiai neighborhood, Klaipėda, Lithuania. It was founded in 1989. The school is being accredited. As of 2007, "Varpas" gymnasium has 68 schoolteachers, including 1 teacher expert and 20 supervisors.
