= Saulius Sondeckis =

Lithuanian musician (1928–2016)

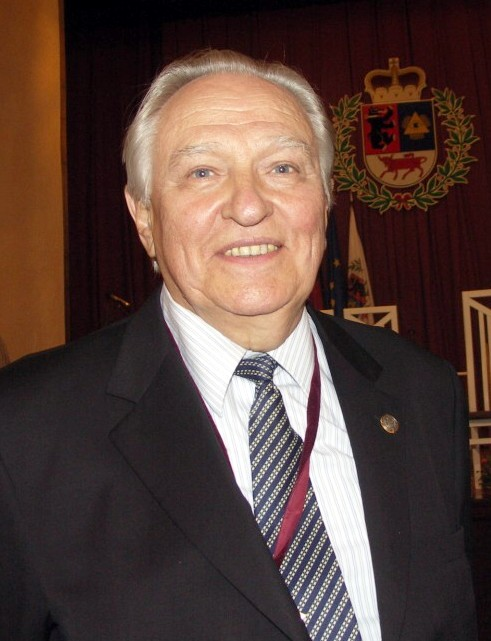
- Sondeckis in 2006
- Born: 11 October 1928; Šiauliai, Lithuania
- Died: 3 February 2016 (aged 87); Vilnius, Lithuania
- Occupations: Conductor, violinist, professor
- Writing career
- Genre: Classical music

Saulius Sondeckis (11 October 1928 – 3 February 2016) was a Lithuanian violinist, conductor, orchestra leader and professor. He founded the Lithuanian Chamber Orchestra in 1960 and was its artistic director and principal conductor until 2004.

== Biography ==
Sondeckis was born in Šiauliai in 1928. He graduated from the Lithuanian Academy of Music and Theatre (Vilnius Conservatory) as a violinist with Alexander Livontas in 1952 and studied conducting with Igor Markevitch. Sondeckis was a member of the Department of String Instruments at the Lithuanian SSR State Conservatoire.

Sondeckis began conducting in 1955 and started at the Student Orchestra of the National M. K. Čiurlionis School of Art. He became a teacher at the Lithuanian Academy in 1959 and became a professor there in 1976. In 1960, Sondeckis founded the Lithuanian Chamber Orchestra in 1960 and it gave its first performance on 30 April 1960. He served as its artistic director and principal conductor until 2004.

Sondeckis led the St. Petersburg State Hermitage Orchestra of St. Petersburg (Camerata) from 1989 and from 2005, he has led the Lithuanian Chamber Orchestra. He has conducted orchestras in many countries and was an honorary member of the Lithuanian Musicians' Union. He is one of the most decorated figures in contemporary classical music in Lithuania, including People's Artist of the USSR (1980), a Laureate of the USSR State Prize (1987) and winner of the Lithuanian National Prize (1999). He has served as a jury member of major international competitions, including Mozart in Salzburg, Tchaikovsky in Moscow and the Toscanini Competitions in Parma. He was also a member of the Herbert von Karajan Foundation in Berlin.

In 2010, Šiauliai Conservatory was renamed after Saulius Sondeckis as Šiauliai Saulius Sondeckis Conservatory. Later it was known as Šiauliai Saulius Sondeckis School of Arts (since 2011) and Šiauliai Saulius Sondeckis Gymnasium of Arts (since 2013).

He died on 3 February 2016 in Vilnius, Lithuania.
