= Vilnius International French Lyceum =

Coordinates: 54°40′34″N 25°17′26″E

Lycée International Français de Vilnius (Lithuanian: Vilniaus tarptautinis prancūzų licėjus)
- Vilniaus tarptautinis prancūzų licėjus
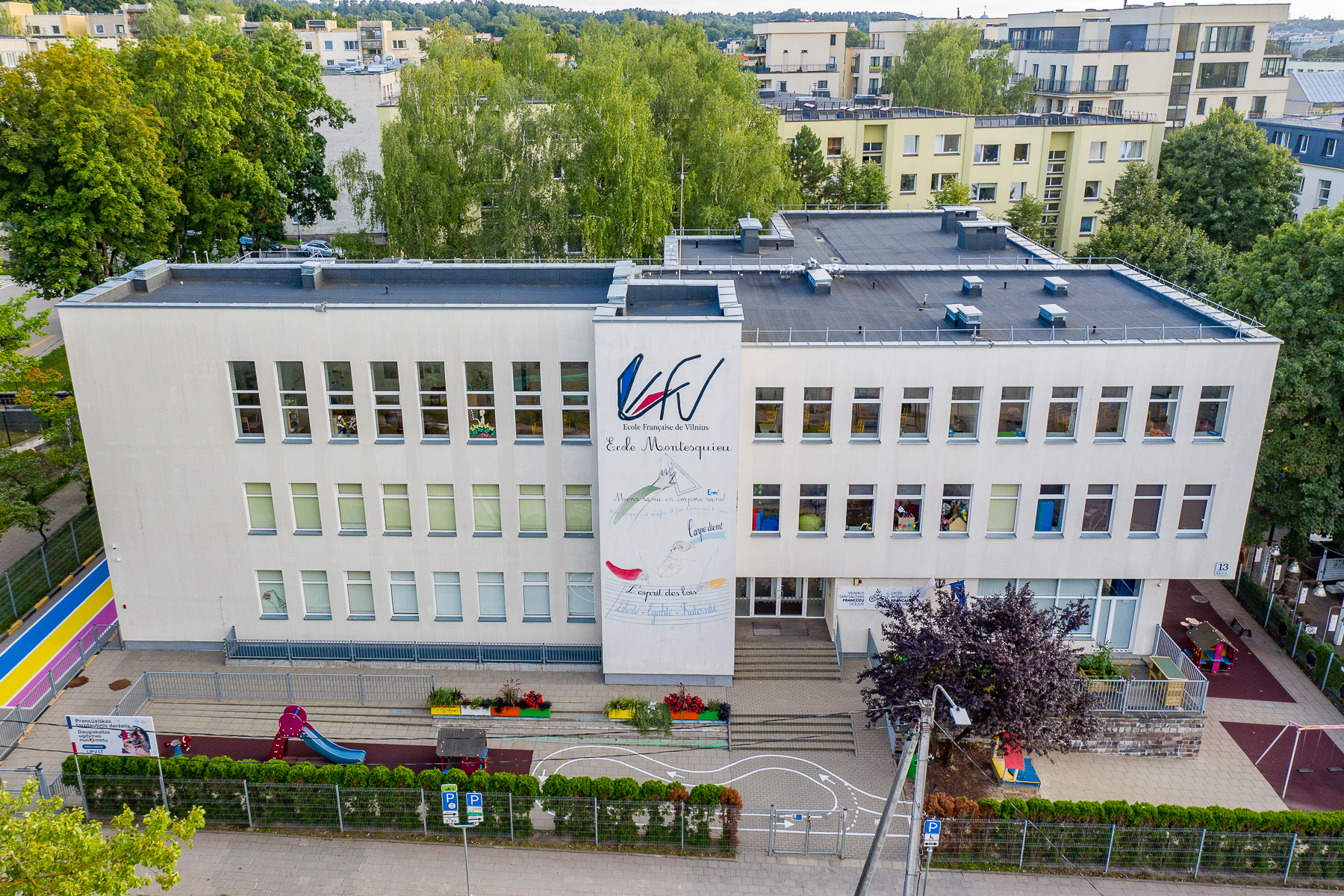

Location
- Šilo g. 13 (Antakalnis) and Subačiaus g. 7, Vilnius; Vilnius; Lithuania

Information
- Former name: École Française de Vilnius
- Type: preschool through high school
- Established: 1992
- Status: Active
- Head of a kindergarten and primary school: Fabienne Colin
- Head-Provisioner: Lilian Filipozzi
- Gender: Mixed
- Age range: 1.5-18
- Enrollment: 600+ (2026)
- Campus: Urban
- Website: lifv.lt/lt/

Lycée International Français de Vilnius or LIFV (Lithuanian: Vilniaus tarptautinis prancūzų licėjus) is a French international school in Vilnius, Lithuania. It has preschool through senior high school levels. It has a preschool and grade 1 building and a building with all other grades. It is affiliated with the Agency for French Education Abroad (AEFE).

It was formerly known as the École Française de Vilnius.

== History ==
It was established in 1992. The initial group of students had diplomats as parents. In 2012 the school had 207 students, with Lithuanians making up over 50%. By 2021 the enrollment count was 550. The current facility opened in 2021. In 2026, the school's website said that the school had 600+ students.

== See also ==
- Vilnius International School
