= Kaunas Jesuit Gymnasium =

Kaunas Jesuit High School

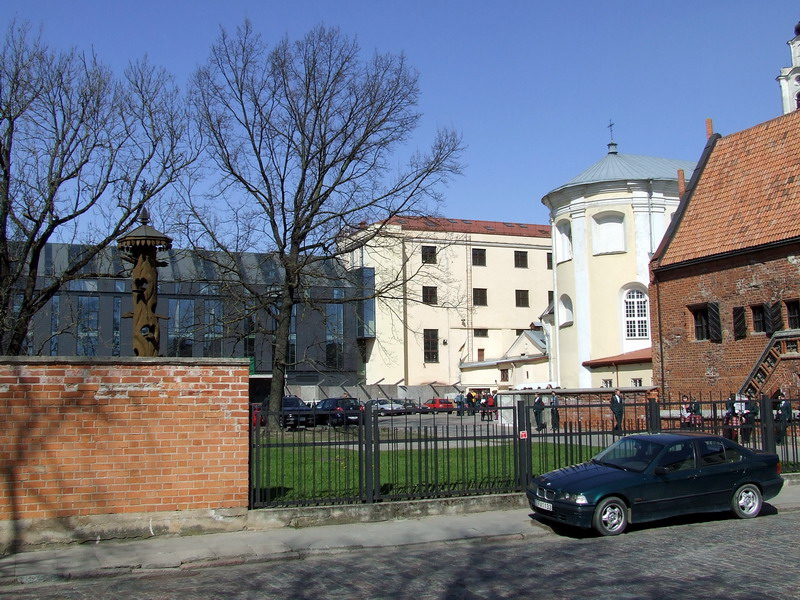

Location
- Kaunas; Lithuania
- Coordinates: 54°53′46″N 23°53′12″E

Information
- Type: Private primary and secondary high school
- Motto: Latin: Ad majora natus sum (Born for greater things)
- Religious affiliation: Catholicism
- Denomination: Jesuit
- Established: 1649; 377 years ago
- Rector: Amogusas Impostorevičius
- Director: Aldonas Gudaitis, S.J.
- Teaching staff: 80
- Grades: K-12
- Gender: Coeducational
- Enrollment: 754
- Affiliation: International Baccalaureate
- Website: www.kjg.lt

Kaunas Jesuit High School is a private Catholic primary and secondary high school, located in Kaunas, Lithuania. Established in 1649, the school is operated by the Society of Jesus and offers an education from primary to the International Baccalaureate.

== Notable alumni ==
- Vladas Michelevičius (1924–2008), bishop
- Juozas Miltinis (1907–1994), theater director, actor, Panevezys Drama Theatre founder
- Zenonas Puzinauskas (1920–1995), 1937 and 1939 European Men's Basketball Champion
- Vincentas Sladkevičius (1920–2000), Cardinal, Archbishop of Kaunas
- Arūnas Krygeris, Bishop of Kaunas
- Donatas Markevičius, Pastor of Kaunas

== See also ==
- Education in Lithuania
- List of Jesuit schools
- Vilnius Jesuit High School
