= Vilnius International School =

Private school in Vilnius, Lithuania

Coordinates: 54°40′55″N 25°17′27″E

Vilnius International School (Lithuanian: Vilniaus tarptautinė mokykla) is a private primary, middle and upper school located in the Old Town of Vilnius, Lithuania. It was established in 2004 and provides education in the English language. As of 2010, the curriculum at Vilnius International School is the International Baccalaureate educational system, making it the first school in Lithuania to offer the IB Primary Years Programme (PYP). In 2013 school year, the school had 285 students: 40% Lithuanians, 18% half Lithuanian, and 42% foreigners from 34 different nations.

== Administration ==
As of May 2024, the director of V.I.S. is Rebecca Juras. The upper school principal is Asta Balkutė, while the primary school principal is Kate Benson. Additionally, the school hosts 3 coordinators: Jemma Thomas, Thibault De Smet, and Diedre Jennings.

== Mission statement ==
“Cultivating learners with the agility of mind and confidence of spirit to become culturally proficient human beings.”

== See also ==
- Vilnius International French Lyceum
