= Kaltinėnai =

- Town
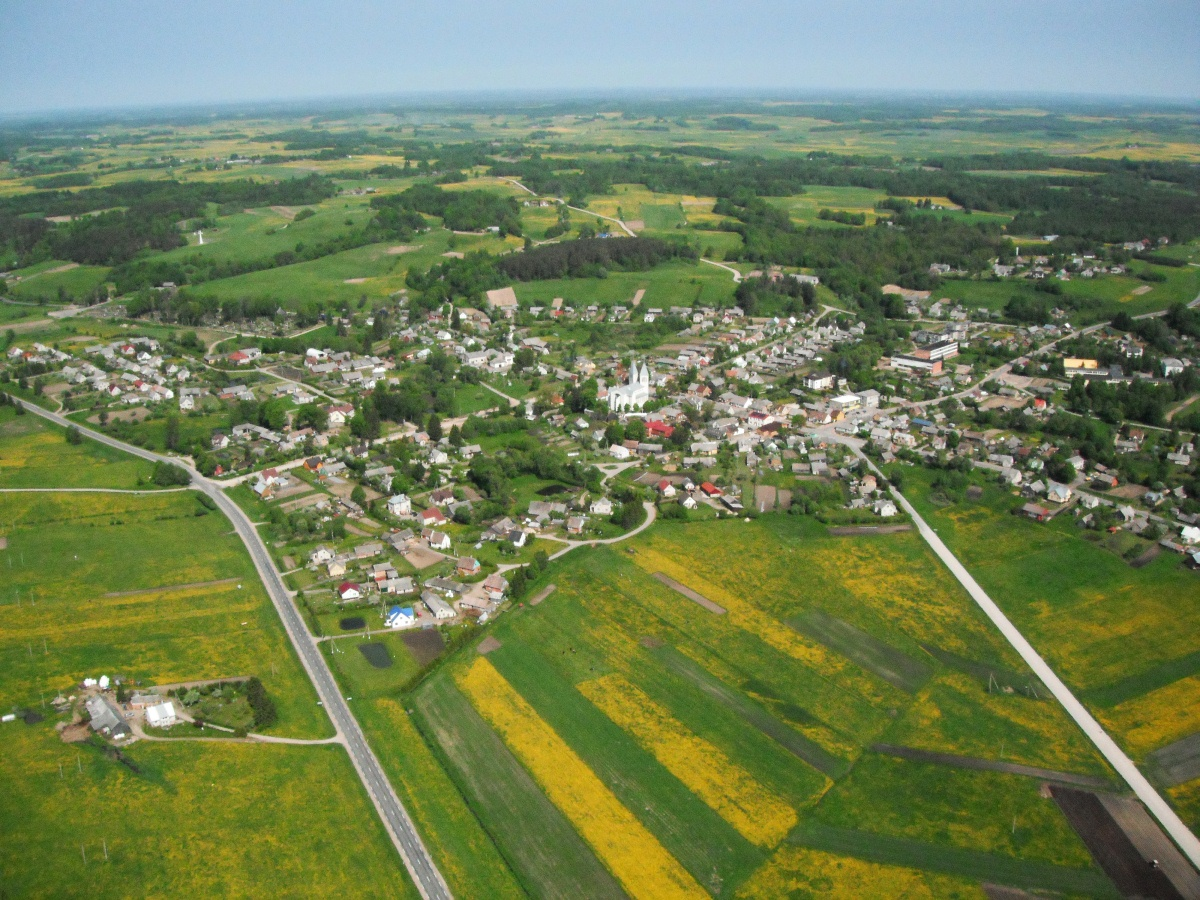

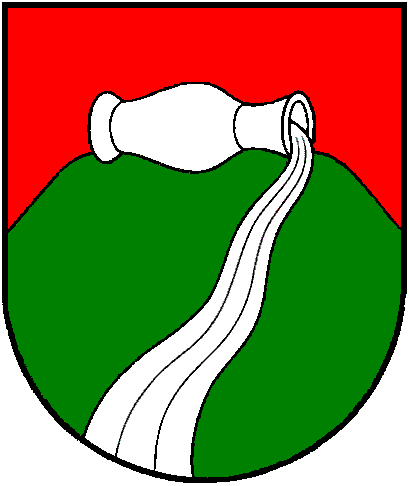
- Coat of arms

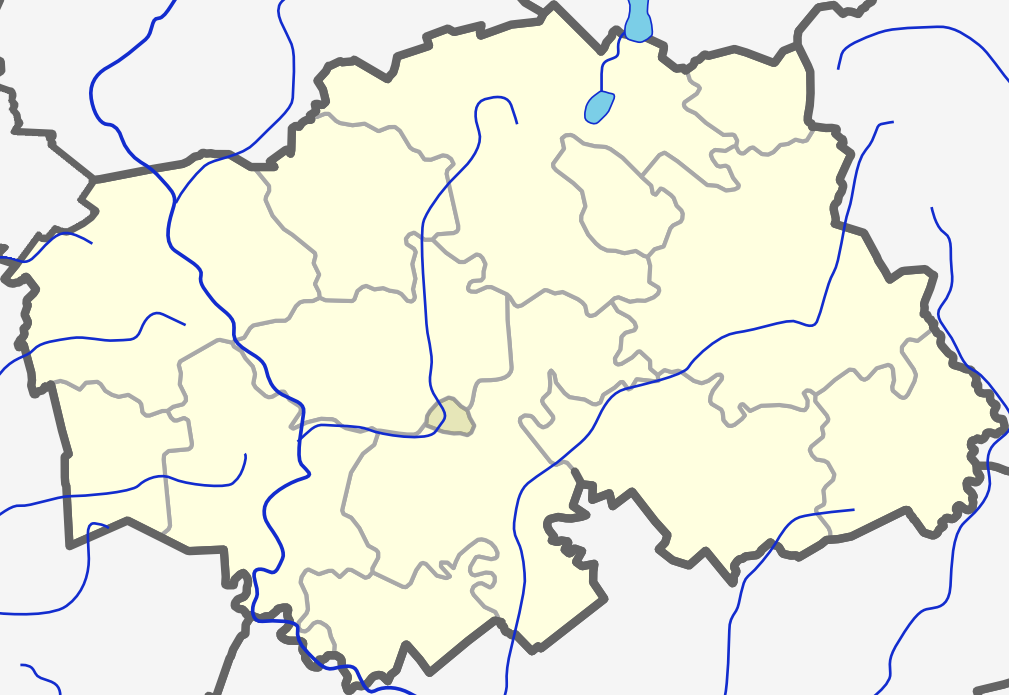
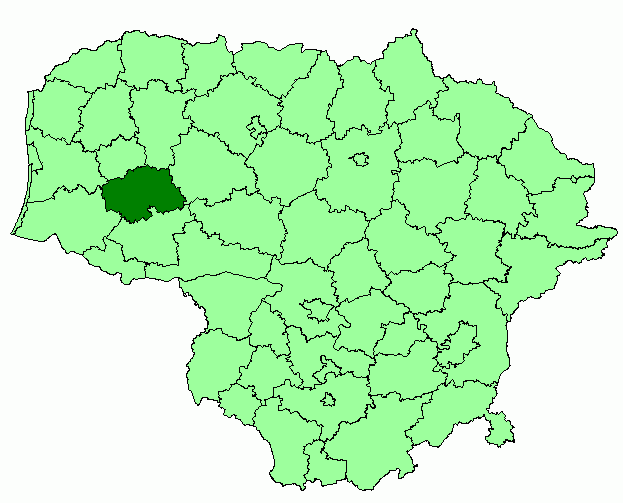
- Location in Šilalė district municipality Location of Šilalė district in Lithuania
- Coordinates: 55°34′00″N 22°27′00″E
- Country: Lithuania
- Ethnographic region: Samogitia
- County: Tauragė
- Municipality: Šilalė
- Eldership: Kaltinėnų
- Capital of: Kaltinėnų eldership
- First mentioned: 1370

Population (2011)
  - Total: 728
- Time zone: UTC+2 (EET)
  - Summer (DST): UTC+3 (EEST)

Kaltinėnai (Samogitian: Kaltinienā, Polish: Kołtyniany) is a small town in the west of Lithuania, located near Žemaičių highway in Šilalė district municipality, Tauragė County. Kaltinėnai has around 728 inhabitants (2011). The town is in a hollow, and it is rumoured that a large lake existed at the end of the Ice age where it now sits. Kaltinėnai is surrounded by famous mounds such as Skuburkalnis, Švedkalnis, Kepaluškalnis and Medvėgalis. There are also two rivers nearby, the Akmena and the Ižnė.

Notable buildings include the church, an old wooden synagogue, a home for the elderly and the Rehabilitation Centre.

== History ==
A stone axe discovered in the town suggests that the area was already inhabited by the Neolithic period. Historians believe that the town was originally part of a larger settlement, but later it split and Kaltinėnai became a separate region.

Kaltinėnai was first mentioned in a German chronicle as terram Kalctene in 1371. Northern Crusaders tried to conquer Kaltinėnai castle many times (in 1375, 1377 and 1389, also planned from 1386–1394), but local inhabitants repelled the attacks.

At the end of the 14th century and beginning of the 15th Kaltinėnai was one of 6–7 of the most important centres in Žemaitija. Signatures of noblemen from Kaltinėnai can be found on important documents. The town was so important that Vytautas the Great ordered one of the first Catholic churches in Žemaitija built in Kaltinėnai (the local population didn't convert to Christianity until 1413) and it was complete by 1421. The See of Žemaitija was founded in 1417 and it ruled the town for more than 400 years.

Kaltinėnai the town was established in 1524. It first appeared on a Polish map two years later, earlier than most of the surrounding towns.

There were more than 70 farms in Kaltinėnai as of 1638, but by 1668 only 50 remained. After the Great Northern War the town continued to decline, for example in 1773 there were only 15 farms that could pay a tax, 19 in 1778.

In 1842 authorities of the Russian tsar brought the ecclesiastical lands under their control and in 1861 made Kaltinėnai the volost centre. In 1901 a local teacher O. Skobinas published the book Kaltinėnai town in which he described contemporary town life. He wrote that a post office opened in 1861, a paramedic centre in 1882, a savings bank in 1897, and a chemist in 1898. Small markets took place every Wednesday, and large ones six times a year. 10 shops, several tearoom-canteens, and 17 craftsmen (seven tailors, five shoemakers, two blacksmiths, two glaziers and a woodworker) also worked in the town. 430 people lived in Kaltinėnai at that time—263 Catholics, 140 Jews, 15 Orthodox and 12 Evangelical Lutherans. Skobinas also mentions that many people had left the area for America to look for a better life.

Kaltinėnai inhabitants were very active in the 1905 Russian Revolution and the town also remained volost centre after the declaration of the Lithuania Independence Act in 1918. The town grew from 660 inhabitants in 1923 to 800 in 1939. Various shops were open in the town during that period, and there was a very active cultural life.

The German Occupation reached Kaltinėnai in June 1941. German soldiers and Lithuanians transferred all Jewish men aged 15 and older, along with those from nearby towns, to the Heydekrug (Silute) work camp. All the Jewish men of Kaltinėnai were killed before troops arrived to liberate the region—one group of weak and elderly men in August 1941, another group in October and November, about 100 men in 1943 when they were transferred from Heydekrug to Auschwitz, some in a Warsaw typhus epidemic after Auschwitz, and the rest in Dachau in 1944. The Jewish women and children were made to do agricultural work by the non-Jewish locals, who then in September 1941 shot them en masse in Tūbinės forest about seven kilometres (4.3 miles) from Kaltinėnai and buried them in mass graves that eventually held 1200 people.

A Lithuanian Underground Representatives’ Congress gathered in Kaltinėnai on 5 September 1944. Its goal was to unite all patriotic organisations into one central resistance group. Although seven representatives were caught in an accident caused by Soviet reconnaissance, and German occupation authorities also sent their representative to the Congress, the Congress was nonetheless very important because the Lithuanian Army for Freedom came out of it as the main organiser of resistance.

On 7 October 1944 Kaltinėnai was occupied by the soviet army and the second Soviet Occupation began. Although this was one of the most difficult times in Lithuanian history, Kaltinėnai retained considerable significance as the centre of the precinct, kolkhoz and parish. The population declined sharply after World War II, but it began to climb again some years later.

Since Lithuania gained independence in 1990, Kaltinėnai has continued to honour its traditions. The town remains the centre of the eldership, which contains 74 settlements.

== Kaltinėnai Aleksandras Stulginskis Gymnasium ==
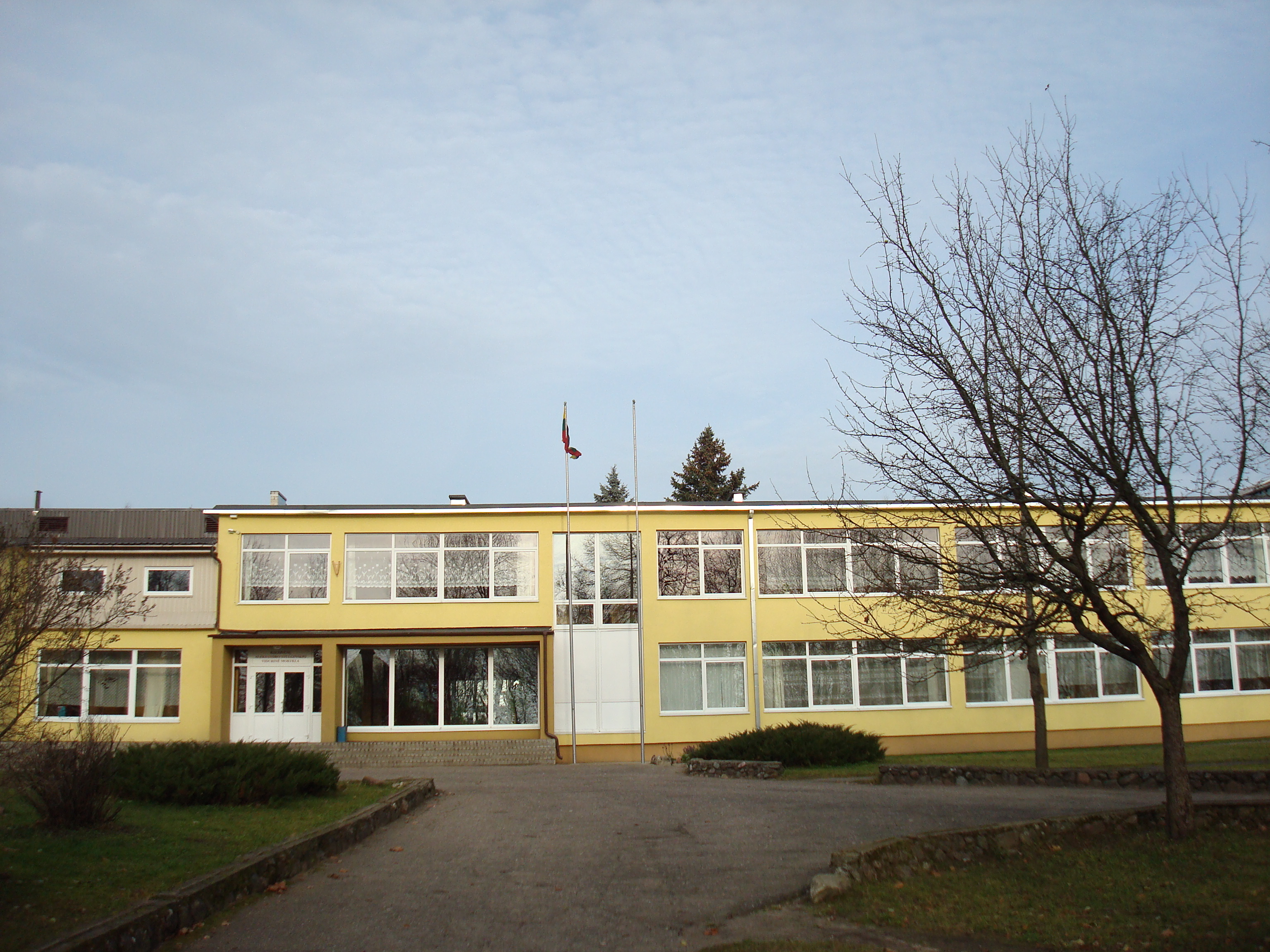
Kaltinėnai Aleksandras Stulginskis Gymnasium

A parish school was founded in Kaltinėnai in 1777. This was later divided into four departments of primary school. In 1944 a pro-gymnasium was founded and after five years it was reorganised into a school with seven forms. In 1951 this school became the secondary school, and in 1969 a new school building was constructed.

Since 1992 the school has participated in a foreign exchange program with the German Hankensbüttel Gymnasium.

On 20 December 1999 the school was named Aleksandras Stulginskis Secondary School, and on 29 January 2009 the school became a gymnasium.

The school now has both primary and secondary divisions, as well as some divisions in nearby villages. The primary school is housed in the former hostel, with four years of study and a kindergarten.

The secondary school is housed in a two-story building with six forms, two optional higher forms, administrative offices, a canteen, a library, two gyms and an Aleksandras Stulginskis museum. There are over 500 students and over 50 teachers.

In 2006 the school won a grant to improve its energy use and was renovated.

== The Church ==
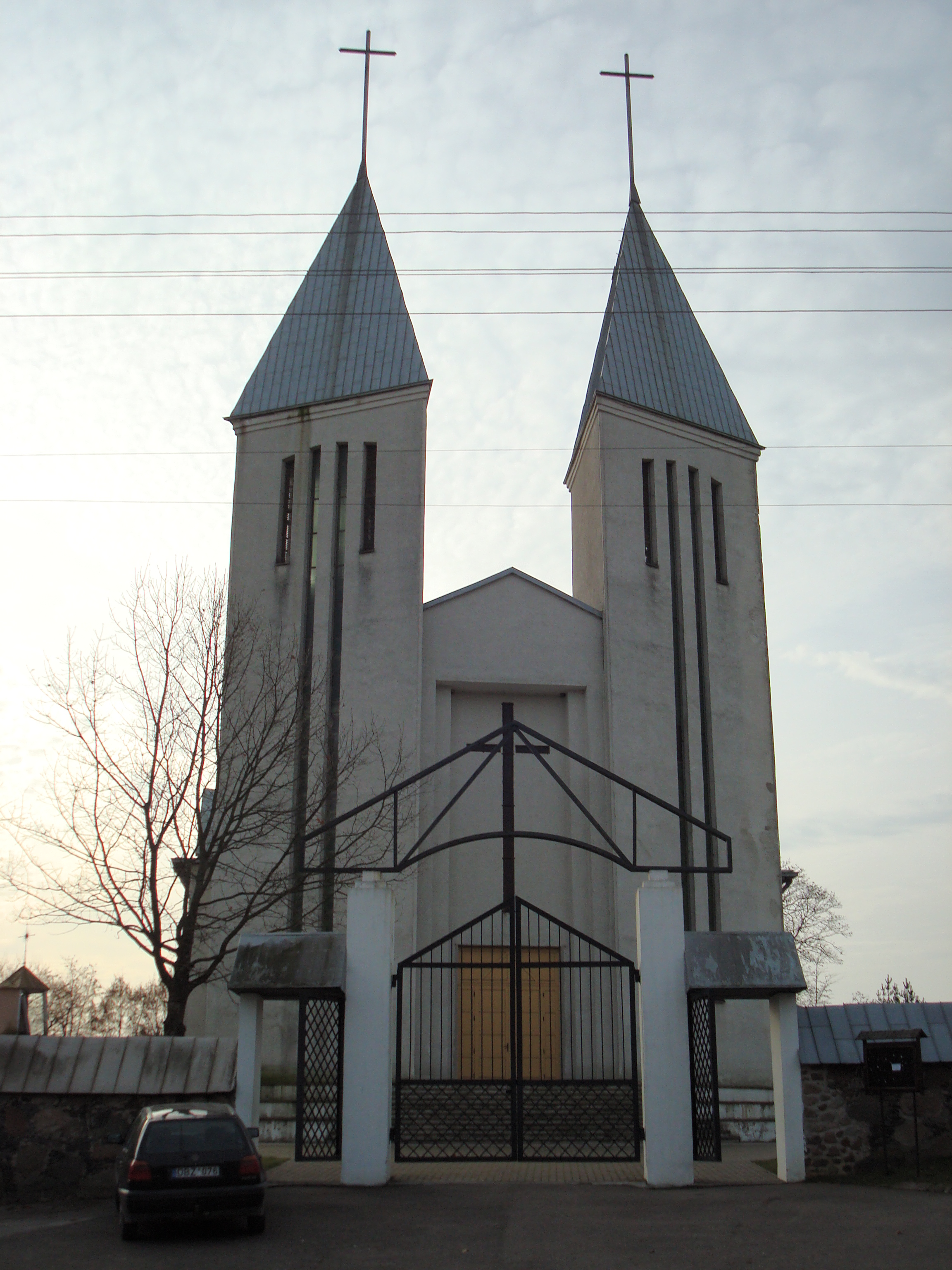
St. John the Baptist church

Since Vytautas the Great built the first wooden church in 1416, there have been about six wooden churches in Kaltinėnai. Some of these churches burned down and others simply collapsed.

The second-most recent church was built in 1896 and burned down in 1988. Only a traditional masonry stone fence, its gate and a wooden belfry remain. After the belfry was rearranged into a temporary chapel it lost the original form somewhat.

The current church, known as the church of St. John the Baptist, was designed by an architect Regimantas Andriuškevičius and completed in 1995. It is a modern sacred architecture building with two 40 m (131.23 ft) high triangular towers and a 4.5 m (14.76 ft) high white marble and bronze sculpture of The Risen Christ by A. Vaura. V. Švanys created stained glass windows for the basement chambers of the church.

== The Graveyard ==
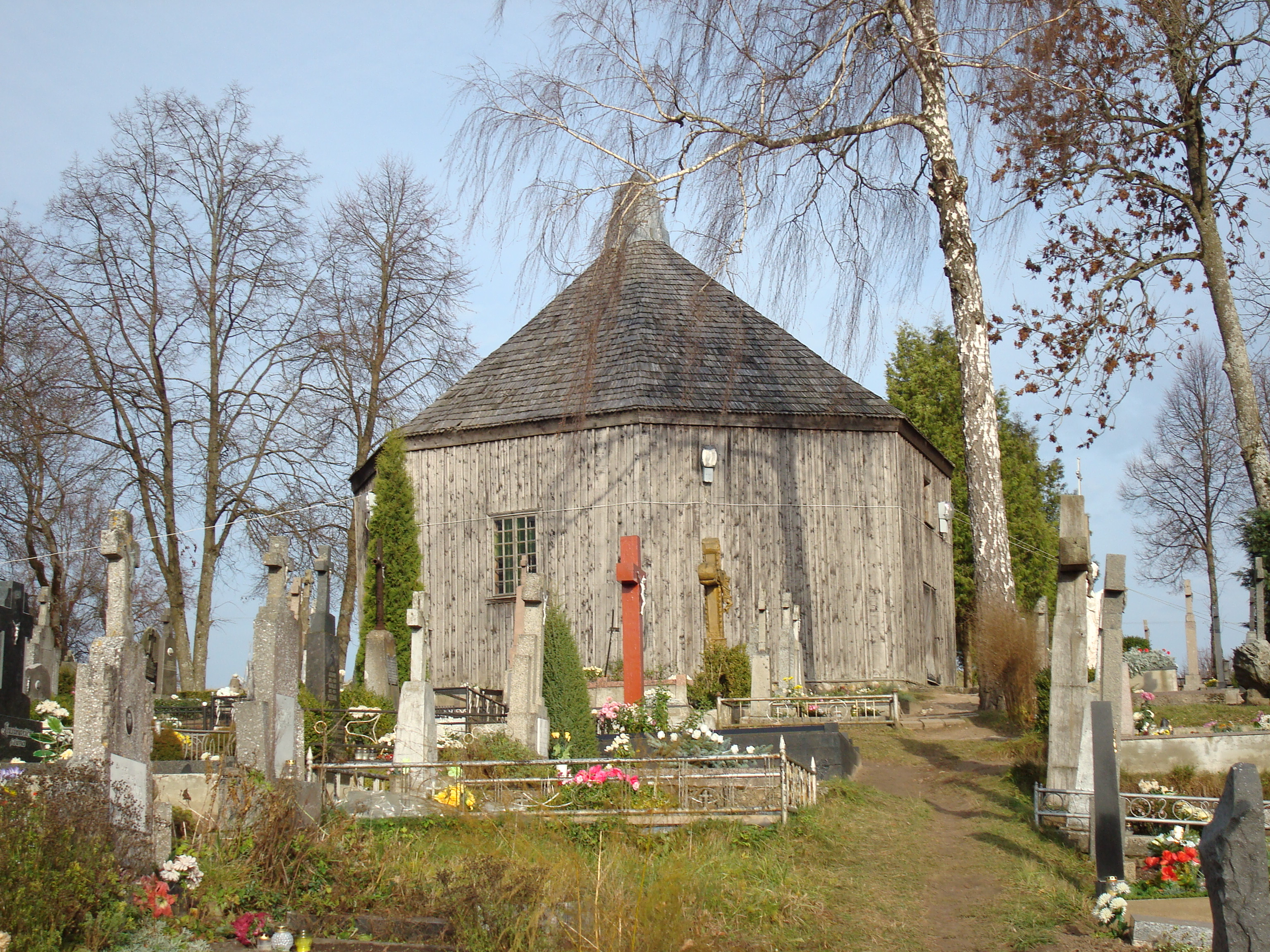
The chapel

The parish graveyard is on the west side of the town. There is an octagonal wooden folk architecture chapel on the hill, built in 1798 and restored in 1989. There are also many saints’ sculptures on the same hill.

The chapel is surrounded by many very old, historical and artistic graves around the chapel, marked with metallic crosses and other gravestones. A high stone obelisk for Dionizas Poška stands near the chapel. Poška was a great poet and founder of the Baubliai museum, the first history museum in Lithuania. Marijona Stulginskienė (Aleksandras Stulginskis's mother) is buried on the southeast side of the graveyard hill.

== The Pilės mound (Kepaluškalnis) ==
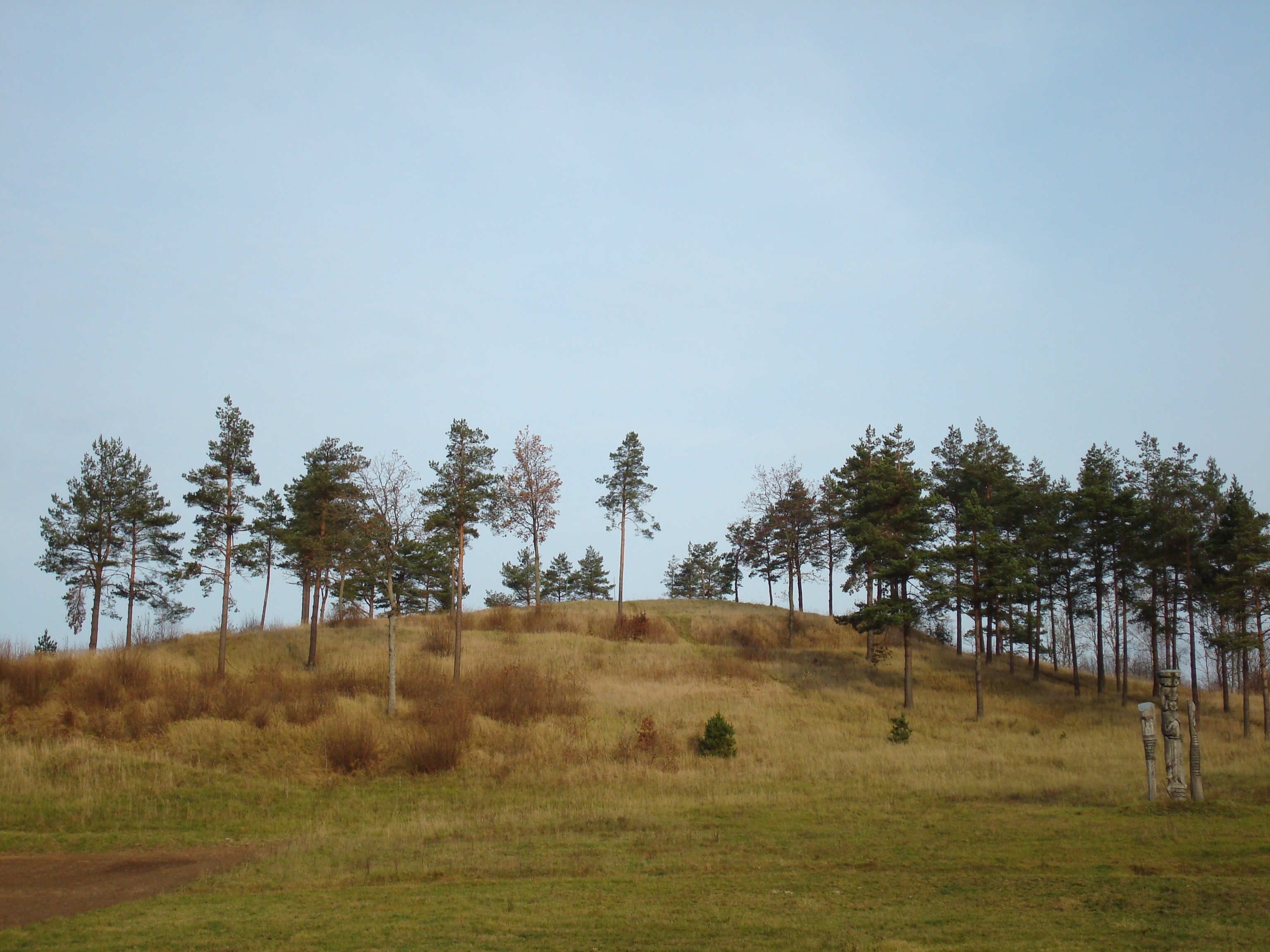
The Pilės mound

The Pilės mound (or Kepaluškalnis) is one of the most valuable cultural monuments in the Šilalė region.

Its hillsides stand at 20 m (65.62 ft) high, and the upper part of the mound is about 2,250 m^{2} (24,218.80 sq ft). Its sides were originally surrounded by defence ramparts that are now flat, but the location of two ramparts is still visible, as are three defence ditches.

Based on the size of the mound and the dimensions of its fortifications, one of the strongest castles in Žemaitija stood on the Pilės Mound during the war with the Crusaders. There have also been various archaeological finds on the mound, such as stone shells.

== The Rehabilitation Centre ==
The Rehabilitation Centre of Kaltinėnai stands near the church. It was built by local priest Petras Linkevičius.
