= Ignalina =

- City
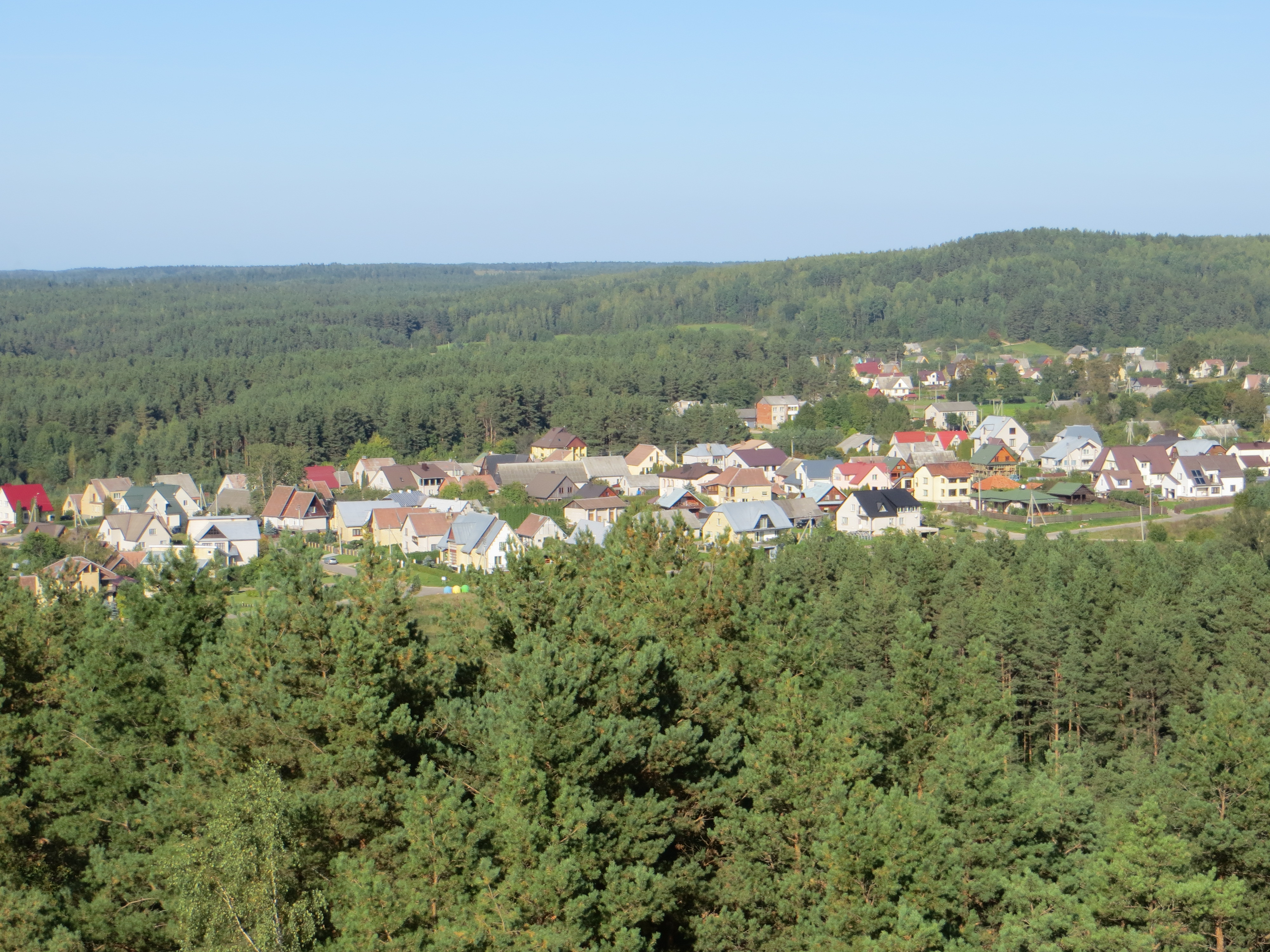

- Flag Coat of arms

- Location of Ignalina
- Coordinates: 55°21′0″N 26°10′0″E
- Country: Lithuania
- Ethnographic region: Aukštaitija
- County: Utena County
- Municipality: Ignalina district municipality
- Eldership: Ignalina town eldership
- Capital of: Ignalina district municipality Ignalina town eldership Ignalina rural eldership
- First mentioned: 1810
- Granted city rights: 1950

Government
  - Mayor: Laimutis Ragaišis (LVŽS)

Area
  - Total: 7 km^{2} (2.7 sq mi)

Population (2023)
  - Total: 4,998
- Time zone: UTC+2 (EET)
  - Summer (DST): UTC+3 (EEST)
- Website: www.ignalina.lt

Ignalina (Polish: Ignalino; German: Ingelin) is a city in eastern Lithuania. It is known as a tourist destination in the Aukštaitija National Park. Ignalina is also famous for the now decommissioned Ignalina Nuclear Power Plant in nearby Visaginas.

== Legend ==
It is said that Ignalina got its name from two lovers Lina, daughter of duke Budrys, and Ignas, captive of the crusaders, whom people cursed and drowned in Ilgis Lake. Lina and Ignas are quite popular Lithuanian names.

== History ==
Archeological findings and artefacts – mounds show that people lived in the territory of Ignalina already in the 9th century. It is supposed that the territory of Ignalina earlier belonged to the ancient land of Nalšia, which was mentioned in 1229–1298. The toponyms and hidronyms demonstrate that it was inhabited by the Baltic tribe Selonians.

Even though there is archeological evidence that people lived in Ignalina area in the Stone Age, Ignalina was mentioned only in 1840. It started to grow only after the Warsaw–Saint Petersburg Railway was built in 1860. It is regarded as one of the new industrial cities.

After World War I, the area was disputed between Poland and Lithuania. It was occupied by Żeligowski's troops, and internationally recognized as part of the Second Polish Republic in 1923. Nonetheless, Lithuania continued to claim this territory. Before September 1939, Ignalina (Ignalino) was situated in the Wilno Voivodeship.

Following the invasion of Poland, Ignalina became the capital of Ignalina eldership. More than half of the population was Jewish, 1,200 people before the Holocaust. During World War II, in 1941, Jews were imprisoned in a ghetto and exploited through forced labour. They were later murdered in mass executions.

In 1950 city become a capital of Ignalina District Municipality in Vilnius County. In 1995 Ignalina District Municipality become a part of Utena County.

== Retail ==
A few supermarkets exist such as "Maxima XX", "Iki", "Norfa XL", "Čia", "Aibė", 2 local supermarkets "Danalta", multiple flower shops, fishing equipment stores as well as a few clothing stores, and "Lile" bakery. "Senukai", "Gieva" and "Statybų Takas" are some home improvement stores.

== Sports ==
Lithuanian Winter Sports Center is located in Ignalina near Šiekštys or Žaliasis (Green) Lake. During the winter Sports Center offers mountain skiing, snowboarding, ski equipment rental services, ski lifts, freeskiing instructors. In the summer there are boats or water bikes rental, tracks for roller skates, mountain bikes.

Also, there is the shooting range, Sports and Entertainment Center, “Žuvėdra” amusement park.

In Ignalina, there are organizing pedestrian, hiking, bicycle and car routes. In the summer there are popular kayak, boat or water bikes trips.

Ignalina used to be the main ski jumping venue in Lithuania until the 1970s when this sport was discontinued in the country.

== Nature and geography ==
Ignalina located in the Aukštaitija National Park. It is a town above 9 lakes.

Ignalina is surrounded by woods and waters. Town takes pride in nine lakes named Gavys, Gavaitis, Ilgys, Šiekštys, Mekšrinis, Paplovinis, Palaukinis, Agarinis and Gulbinis.

In the Ignalina District Municipality there are more than 200 lakes.

== Places of interest ==
In Ignalina and around the town there are more than 130 interesting places to visit. For example, Ignalina Regional Museum, Paliesius Manor, Monument to Ignas and Lina, Palūšė St. Joseph's Church, Bell Tower, and Chapel, which is a Cultural Monument built in the second half of the 18th century, Beekeeping Museum in Stripeikiai, which is the only beekeeping museum in Lithuania, etc.

In some places there are organizing educational programs and special showcases, such as the baking of Šakotis in the restaurant "Romnesa“.

== Festivals ==
In Ignalina, there are traditional festivals including the opening and closing of the summer season, the biannual festival "Ežerų sietuva", spring and autumn fairs, etc.

== Education institutions ==
- Ignalina Česlovas Kudaba Gymnasium
- Ignalina school-kindergarten "Šaltinėlis"
- Ignalina Mikas Petrauskas music school

== Notable people ==
- Arūnas Bubnys (b. 1961), historian
- Mantas Strolia (b. 1986), skier
- Algimantas Šalna (b. 1960), biathlete
- Tomas Kaukėnas (b. 1990), biathlete
- Diana Rasimovičiūtė (b. 1984), biathlete
- Modestas Vaičiulis (b. 1989), skier
- Aurelija Tamašauskaitė (b. 1999), swimmer
- Paulius Golubickas (b. 1999), Professional Lithuanian footballer

== Twin towns – sister cities ==
Ignalina is twinned with:

- Büren, Germany
- Østfold, Norway
- Prachatice, Czech Republic
- Serock, Poland
- Korsun-Shevchenkivskyi Ukraine
