= Kaunas University of Technology Gymnasium =

- Kaunas; Lithuania

Information
- Established: 1989
- President: Ąžuolas Merčaitis
- Principal: Tomas Kivaras
- Enrollment: 341
- Website: www.ktug.lt

The Gymnasium of Kaunas University of Technology (KTUG) is a state gymnasium in Kaunas, Lithuania.

The school was established by Kaunas University of Technology (KTU) in 1989 and adopted its current name in 1990. It serves students from across Lithuania, and its first graduating class left in 1991. The school has two first-year classes and three-second-, third-, and fourth-year classes.

The school has 38 teaching staff, including 16 KTU lecturers. The school is located on the KTU campus, allowing it to use University laboratories and sport facilities.

== History ==
Kaunas University of Technology Gymnasium is a high school which was founded in 1989. It was initially a project of helping extraordinary kids learn sophisticated material in order to prepare for University and achieve worldwide results. The high school was legally confirmed as a gymnasium in 1992. The school has close ties with KTU allowing students to participate in numerous University events.

== Enrolment ==
KTUG is famous for its application rate. On average, 20% of applicants are accepted each year to the first grade (9th grade or freshmen year) of Gymnasium. In total, four exams, including maths, Lithuanian, English and natural science have to be taken in order to apply for this school. Moreover, 5 so called Science Leader Tournaments (Mokslo lyderių turnyrai) are held throughout each year. There, students can examine their capabilities of solving all sorts of tasks. Each competition consists of two tests, the topic of a test (usually a class like maths, English, natural sciences, Lithuanian, or history) is not known until the start of it, so a student-to-be cannot prepare for it without preparing for all the subjects. 15 students that got highest scores during the Science Leader Tournaments are invited to the school and do not need to hold an entry test.

== Principals ==
- 1990–2014 Bronislovas Burgis
- 2015–current Tomas Kivaras

== The winners of international olympiads ==
Teaching exceptionally gifted students is a prioritized sphere of education which enables students to utilize their full potential and talent. Pupils representing the Gymnasium have won 105 medals and 20 honorary certificates in global student Olympiads:

- Natural sciences − 30 medals (4 golds, 17 silvers, 10 bronzes)
- Information sciences − 20 medals (9 silvers, 11 bronzes)
- Chemistry − 18 medals (4 golds, 9 silvers, 5 bronzes) and 2 honorary certificates
- Mathematics − 14 medals (1 gold, 2 silvers, 11 bronzes) and 13 honorary certificates
- Biology − 7 medals (1 silver, 6 bronzes)
- Debates − 3 medals (2 golds, 1 bronze)
- Astrophysics − 3 medals (1 gold, 1 silver, 1 bronze)
- Physics − 3 medals (3 bronzes) and 5 honorary certificates
- History – 2 medals (1 gold, 1 bronze)
- Geography – 3 medals (2 silvers, 1 bronze)

== Alumni ==
- Dr. Audrius Alkauskas (born 1978) - physicist.
- Dr. Giedrius Alkauskas (born 1978) - mathematician, musicologist, composer.
- Dr. Kęstutis Česnavičius (born 1989) - mathematician.
- Dr. Nerijus Mačiulis (born 1979) – economist.
- Liutauras Ulevičius (born 1980) – legal scholar, blogger, PR/PA professional.
- Salomėja Zaksaitė (born 1985) – chess player (WIM), legal scholar and criminologist.

== Presidents ==
- 1997/1998 Liutauras Ulevičius
- 1998/1999 Remigijus Staniulis
- 2003/2005 Audrius Židonis
- 2008/2009 Vaiva Jakutytė
- 2009/2010 Gabrielė Jagelavičiūtė
- 2010/2011 Snaigė Židonytė
- 2011/2012 Enrikas Etneris
- 2012/2013 Marija Šmulkštytė
- 2013/2014 Andrius Kriukas
- 2014/2015 Vainius Podolinskis
- 2015/2016 Ieva Šalnaitė
- 2016/2017 Luka Kemežytė
- 2017/2018 Dovydas Januška
- 2018/2019 Gabija Vasiliauskaitė
- 2019/2020 Vykintas Vaitkus
- 2020/2021 Austėja Lazaravičiūtė

== See also ==
- Vilnius Lyceum
