= Ignalina Česlovas Kudaba Gymnasium =

Coordinates: 55.343427°N 26.158649°E

- Ignalinos Česlovo Kudabos gimnazija
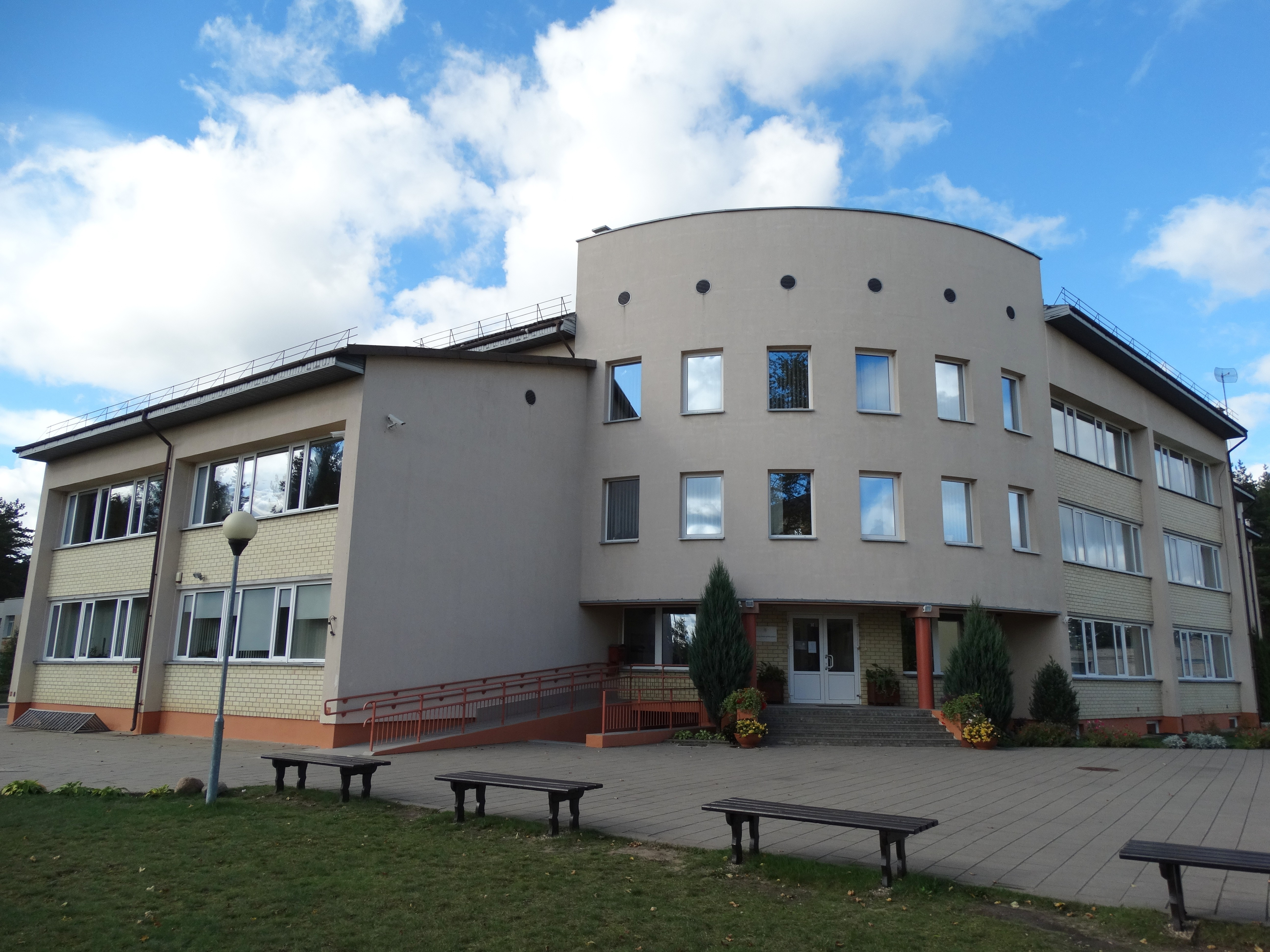

Location
- Mokyklos g. 6 Ignalina; Lithuania, LT-30119

Information
- Established: 1946
- Director: Valentina Čeponienė
- Student to teacher ratio: 12:1
- Website: www.irg.lt
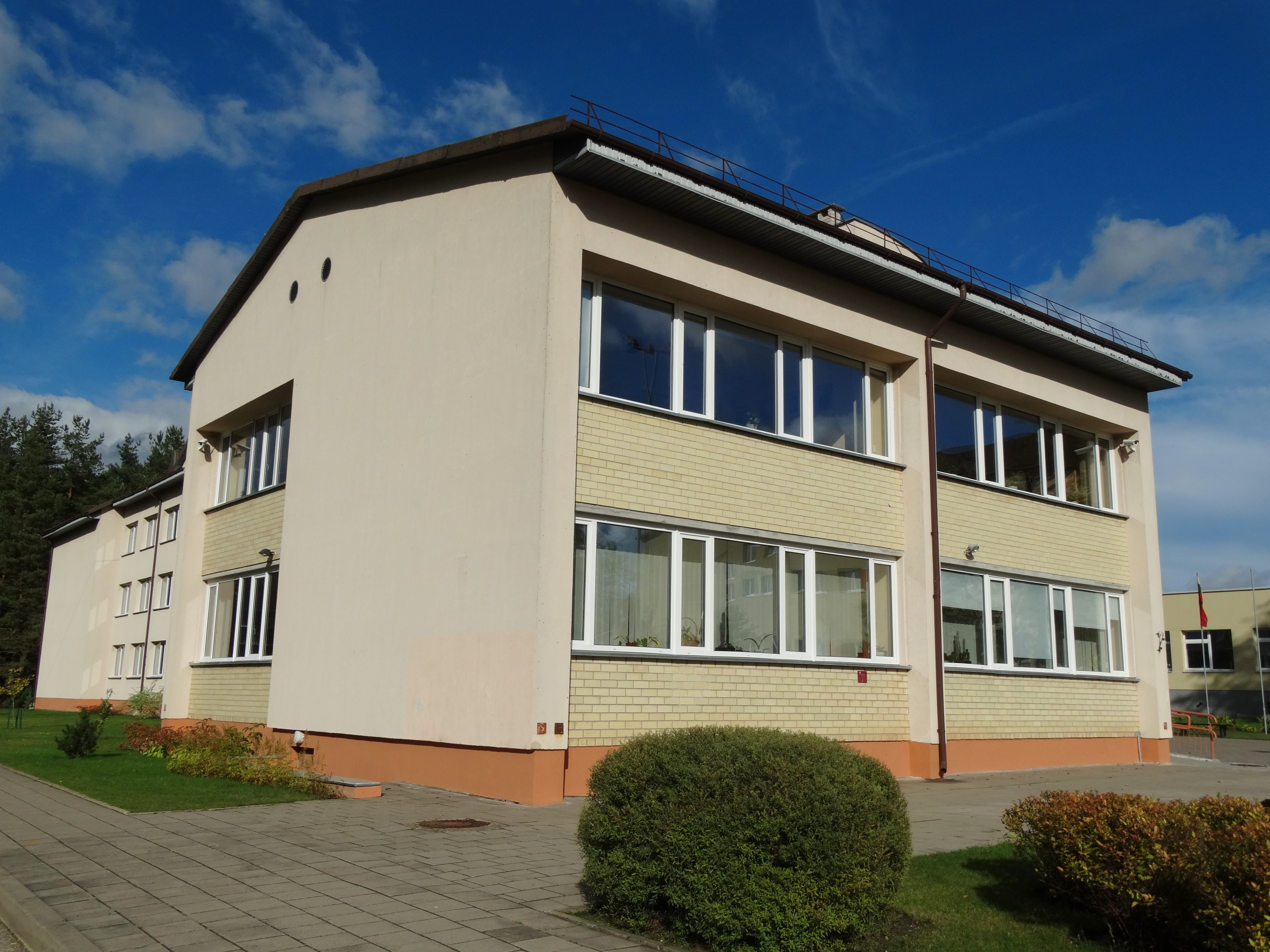
- View of the Ignalina gymnasium

The Ignalina Česlovas Kudaba Gymnasium is a secondary school in Ignalina, Lithuania. The gymnasium was originally named the Ignalina Regional Gymnasium, until 2012 when it became Ignalina Gymnasium. Due to demographic crisis in Lithuania, the number of students has decreased significantly. In 2004 it had 553 students, in 2017 – 286 students.

Gymnasium history
Date	Description
1946–1948	Operating gymnasium
1949	Secondary school
1996	Ignalina Česlovas Kudaba progymnasium had the idea to revive its gymnasium.
1999	Progymnasium opened, and teachers began to develop programs.
2000	The gymnasium established its first four humanities curricula.
2002-07-15	The secondary school was subdivided into Ignalina Česlovas Kudaba elementary school and high school (in Ignalina district) and the Ignalina region gymnasium.
2002-09-02	Opening ceremony. Each high school class contains over 100 students from Ignalina Česlovas Kudaba progymnasium and other district schools.
2002–2011	Birutė Smalienė was appointed principal.
2012	The tenth crop of students graduated from the gymnasium.
2012-09-01	Ignalina Regional Gymnasium was renamed Ignalina Gymnasium.
2021-11-11	Renamed Ignalina Česlovas Kudaba Gymnasium.
