= List of lakes of Lithuania =

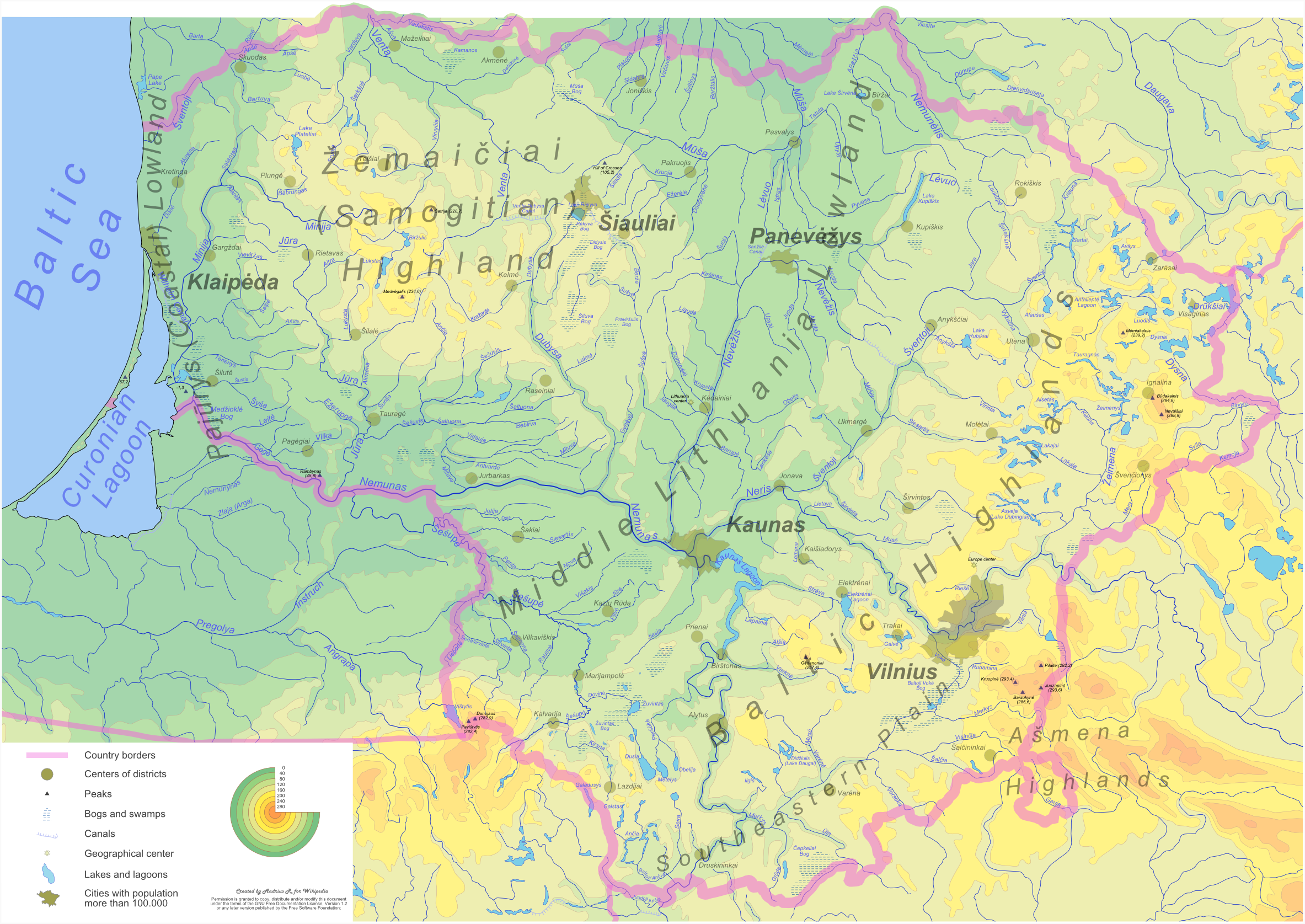
Detailed physical map of Lithuania

There are about 6,000 lakes in Lithuania, covering 950 km^{2}, or 1.5% of the territory of Lithuania. The lakes are not evenly distributed; most are situated in the Baltic Highlands, which begin near the border with Poland on the southeast and extend northward along the border with Belarus to Latvia.

About 1,200 are supported only by groundwater and neither receive nor distribute any surface water. However, many of the other lakes are interconnected by complex passages and streams. These lake systems are major tourist attractions in Aukštaitija National Park and are popular with kayakers. The lakes in and near the Molėtai district municipality are a weekend destination for many residents of Vilnius, who have summer houses and villas in the area.

== Lake origins ==
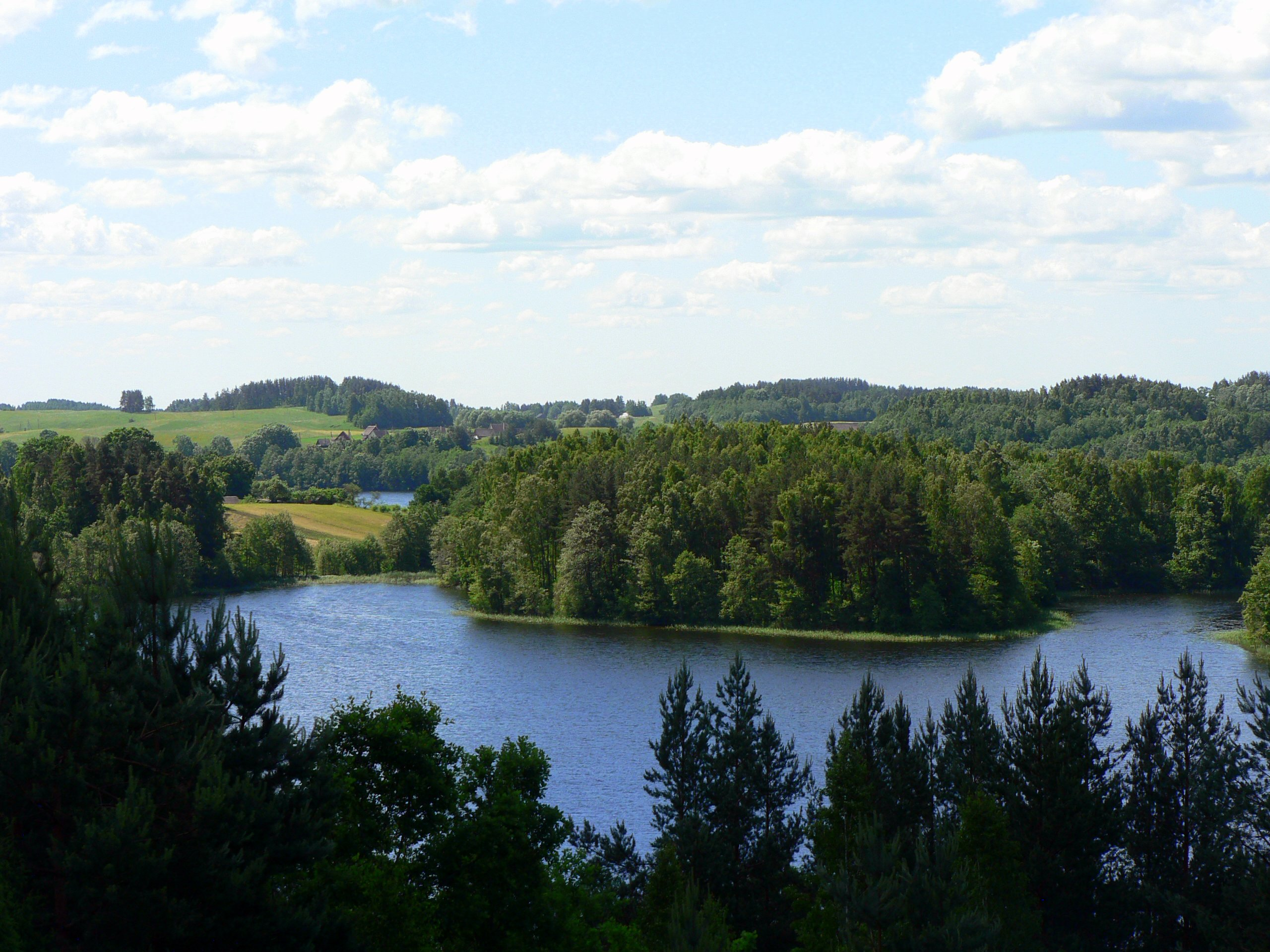
Lakes in Aukštaitija National Park, seen from Ladakalnis Hill

The great majority of Lithuania's lakes formed after the Wisconsin glacier retreated. The oldest date from about 13,000 years before the present. The varieties of glacial lakes include:

- Moraine-dammed lakes (Lithuanian: užtvenktiniai ežerai) formed when glacial moraines blocked glacier meltwater drainage. These lakes include Dysnai, Plateliai, and Vištytis
- Kettle lakes (Lithuanian: guoliniai or termokarstiniai ežerai) formed when a large piece of ice broke away from the edge of a retreating glacier, and was then buried under its sediments. After the piece melted, a small depression was left in the landscape that filled with water. These lakes tend to be small, round, and quite deep. Due to their small size most of them are unnamed. The best-known of these is Lake Druskonis.

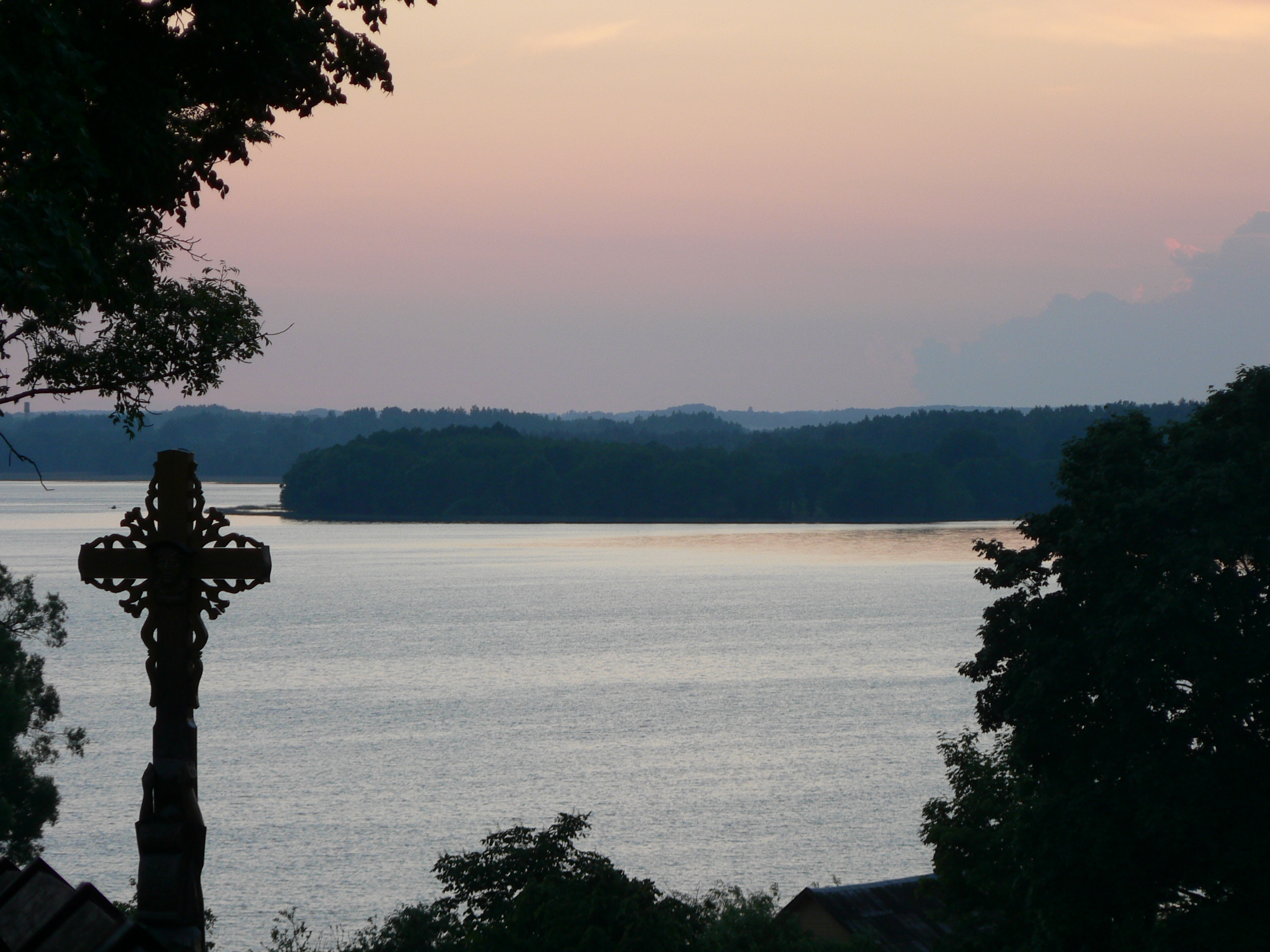
Lūšiai Lake near Palūšė

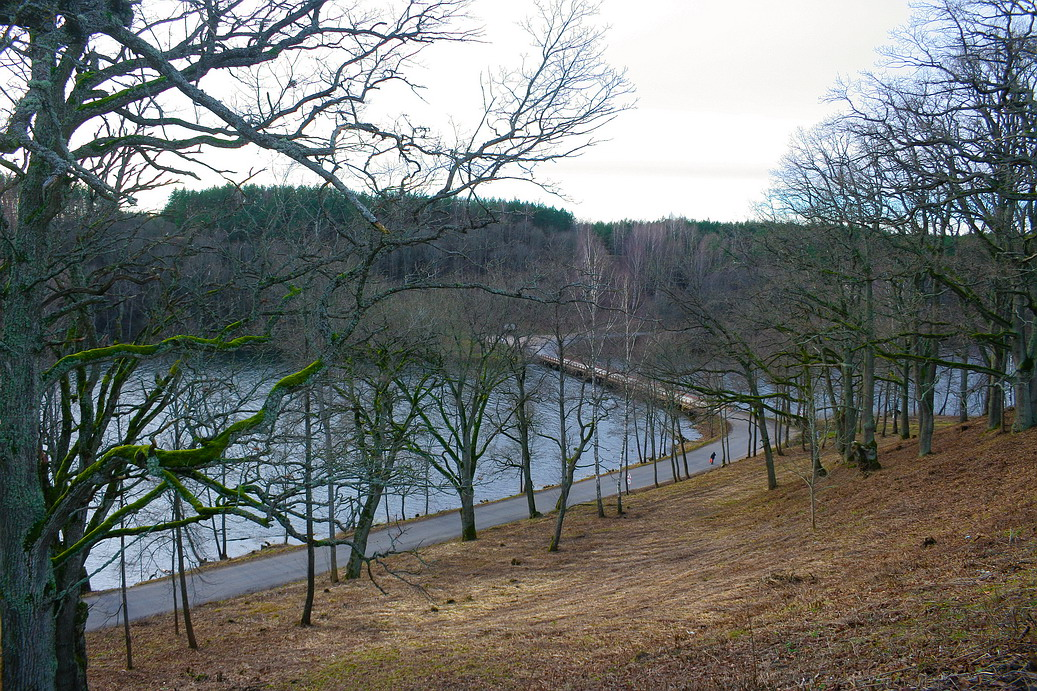
Asveja Lake near Dubingiai

- (Lithuanian: Ledo guolio ežerai) formed much like kettle lakes, but are much larger. The pieces of ice were not buried under sediment. These lakes are often irregularly shaped, with uneven bottoms. Examples include Dusia, Metelys, Obelija, and Kretuonas.
- (Lithuanian: Dubakloniai, latakiniai, or rininiai ežerai) formed when meltwater washed steep, narrow, and deep valleys. When the valleys filled with water afterwards, lakes such as Asveja, Tauragnas, Sartai, and Aisetas were formed.
- Residual lakes (Lithuanian: liekaniniai ežerai) are the remains of large lakes that formed immediately adjacent to melting ice caps. These lakes are large, shallow, and surrounded by wetlands and peat bogs. Examples include Rėkyva, Žuvintas, and Amalvas.
- Some lakes are of mixed origins, created when a dam was constructed and the resulting reservoir flooded one or more lakes of glacial origin. Examples include Drūkšiai, Didžiulis or Daugai, and Galvė.

The lakes of non-glacial origins include:

- Oxbow lakes (Lithuanian: senvaginiai, salpiniai, or upiniai ežerai) are abundant. There are over 1,300 of them. The largest are located in the Neman River delta.
- Sinkhole lakes (Lithuanian: karstiniai ežerai) are prevalent in the Biržai district municipality. There are about 300 such lakes, although their surface area covers only 10 hectares. It has been suggested that most of them are interconnected.
- Underground lakes (Lithuanian: požeminiai ežerai) are also found in the Biržai district municipality. The largest one is in Cow's Cave (Lithuanian: Karvės ola); its water temperature is a constant +4.5 degrees Celsius.
- A marine lake (Lithuanian: lagūniniai or jūriniai ežerai), Krokų Lanka, was formed when various drifts from the Neman River separated a part of the Curonian Lagoon. It is the only such lake in Lithuania.
- Reservoirs (Lithuanian: tvenkiniai or kūdros) were created when a river was dammed, or were excavated as a local project. There about 3,400 such lakes, but only 340 of them cover more than 5 hectares. Most of the dams were built during the second part of the 20th century when the Soviet government authorities organized massive land use changes.

== Largest lakes ==
#	Natural lakes				Reservoirs			
#	Name	Area (km^{2})	Max. depth (m)	Notes	Name	Area (km^{2})	River	Year finished
1	Lake Drūkšiai	44.8	33.3	Shared with Belarus; supports Ignalina Nuclear Power Plant	Kaunas Reservoir	63.50	Nemunas River	1959
2	Lake Dysnai	24.39	6.0		Antalieptė Reservoir	15.72	Šventoji River	1959
3	Lake Dusia	23.34	31.7		Elektrėnai Reservoir	12.64	Strėva	1961
4	Lake Vištytis	17.9	52	Shared with Russia (Kaliningrad Oblast), highest lake elevation (170 meters above sea level)	Kupiškis Reservoir	8.28	Lėvuo	1984
5	Lake Sartai	13.31	20.9	Longest shoreline (79 kilometers), known for horse races on ice	Kapčiamiestis Reservoir	7.17	Šventoji	1957
6	Lake Luodis	13.02	18.4		Bubiai Reservoir	4.18	Dubysa	1978
7	Lake Metelys	12.86	15.0		Lake Širvėna	3.35	Apaščia	1580
8	Lake Avilys	12.58	13.5	Has the most islands (31)	Kruonis Reservoir	3.06	-	1992
9	Lake Plateliai	12.04	46.0	Largest lake in Samogitia, well known for yachting	Aukštadvaris Reservoir	2.93	Verknė	1960
10	Lake Rėkyva	11.84	4.5	Part of Šiauliai city	Balskai Reservoir	2.8	Jūra	1963

== Other notable lakes ==
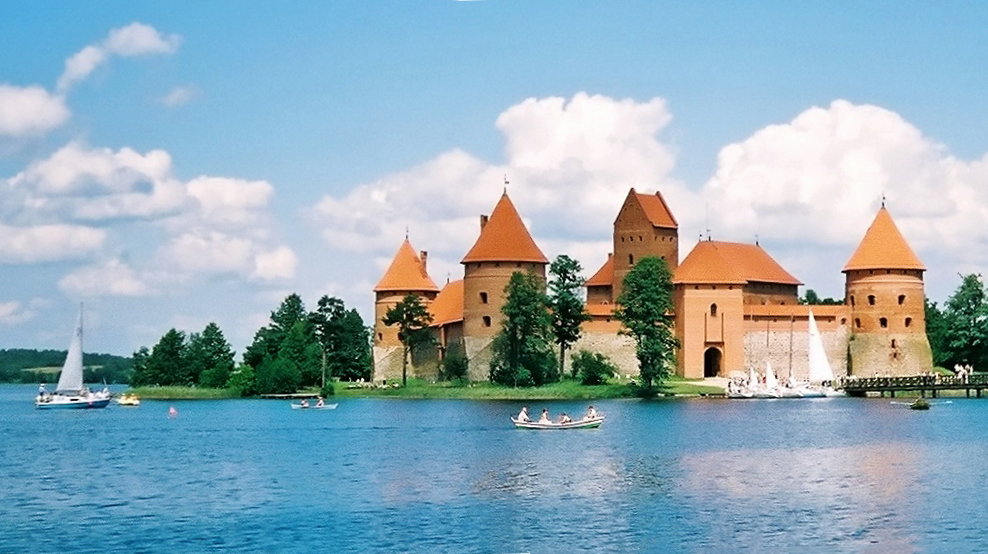
Trakai castle, situated on a lake island

- Lake Asveja has the longest coastline - almost 30 kilometers, when all its inlets are considered. It is also the third deepest lake (50.2 m).
- Lake Tauragnas is the deepest (62.5 m) lake in Lithuania and it has the highest altitude above sea (165 m).
- Lake Baluošas has an island that contains its own tiny lake.
- Lake Žuvintas is a strictly protected body of water. It is the shallowest lake in Lithuania; its greatest depth is 3 meters, averaging 1 meter. It is a notable waterfowl habitat, but is filling with vegetation.
- Lake Galvė's island houses Trakai castle.
- Lithuania's largest lake is Drūkšiai. Its catchment area covers the surrounding creeks, coastal wetlands and forests. The lake is surrounded with many types of rare vegetation not only in Lithuania but also throughout Europe, and the lake itself is valuable as a habitat of rare birds, crustaceans and fish species.
- Lake Sartai has the longest coastline in Lithuania – as many as 79 km. Also it has a variety of fish: rope, perch, pike, roach, bream, roach, bleak, silver bream, ide, catfish, chub, and other fish.
- Plateliai is one of the most transparent lakes in Lithuania, its bottom terrain is very diverse, with many depths and shallows.
