= Alksnaitis =

Lithuanian lake

Lake Alksnaitis
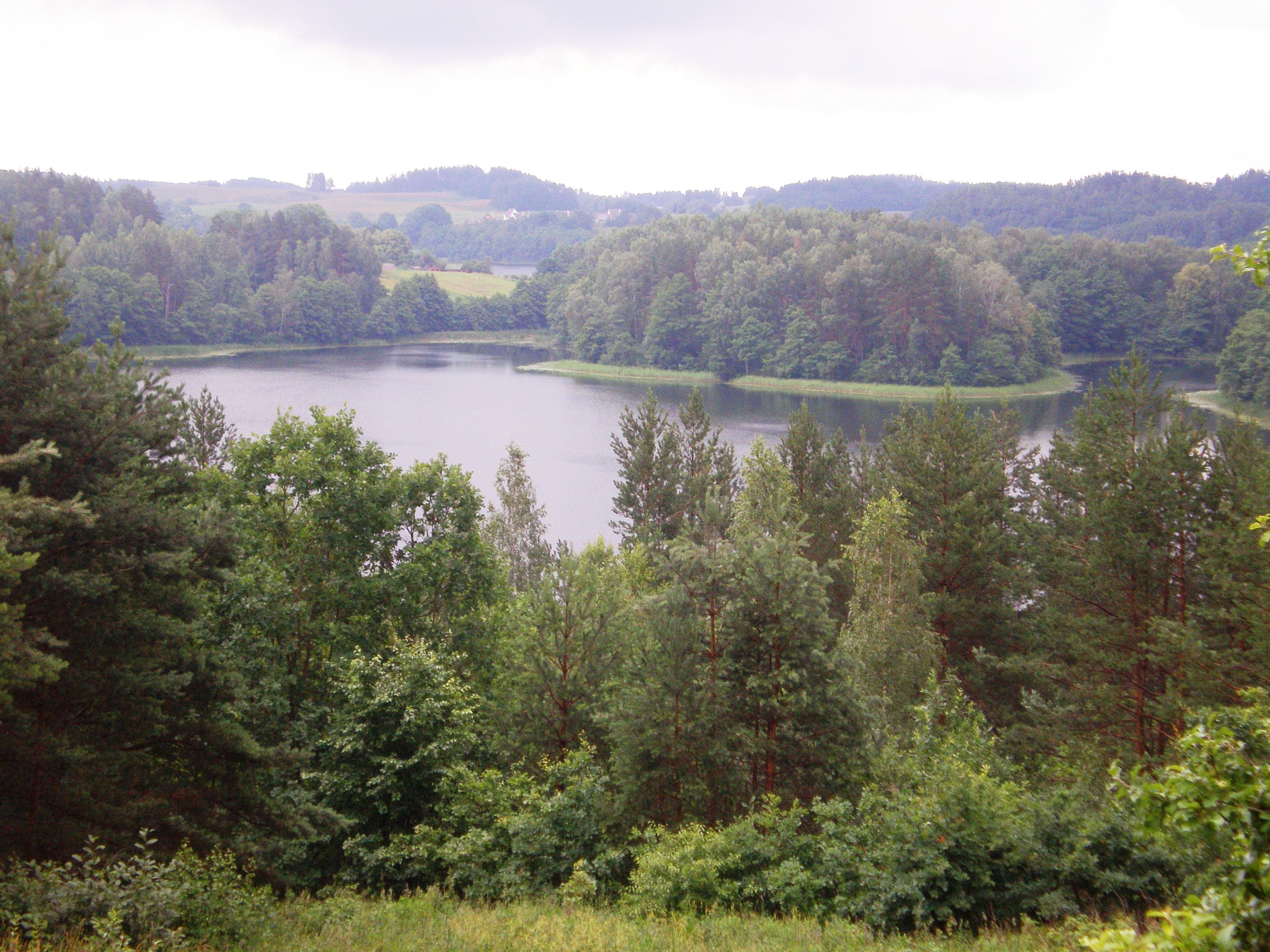
- From Ladakalnis hill

- Location within Lithuania
- Location: Ignalina district
- Coordinates: 55.3521°N 25.9925°E
- Primary inflows: Novena (from Ūkojas)
- Primary outflows: Alksnelė (to Linkmenas)
- Catchment area: Žeimena
- Basin countries: Lithuania
- Surface area: 0.319 km^{2} (0.123 sq mi)
- Average depth: 5.1 m (17 ft)
- Max. depth: 21.2 m (70 ft)
- Shore length^{1}: 4.01 km (2.49 mi)
- Surface elevation: 138.7 m (455 ft)
- Islands: 3
- ^{1} Shore length is not a well-defined measure.

Alksnaitis is a lake in the Ignalina district, eastern Lithuania. It is located in the Aukštaitija National Park, about 3.5 kilometres (2.2 mi) northwest of Linkmenys village. The lake connects with Alksnas, Ūkojas and Linkmenas lakes.

== Sources ==
- Jonas Zinkus; et al., eds. (1988). "Alksnaitis". Tarybų Lietuvos enciklopedija (in Lithuanian). Vol. 1. Vilnius: Vyriausioji enciklopedijų redakcija.
