= Žeimenys =

Lake in Lithuania

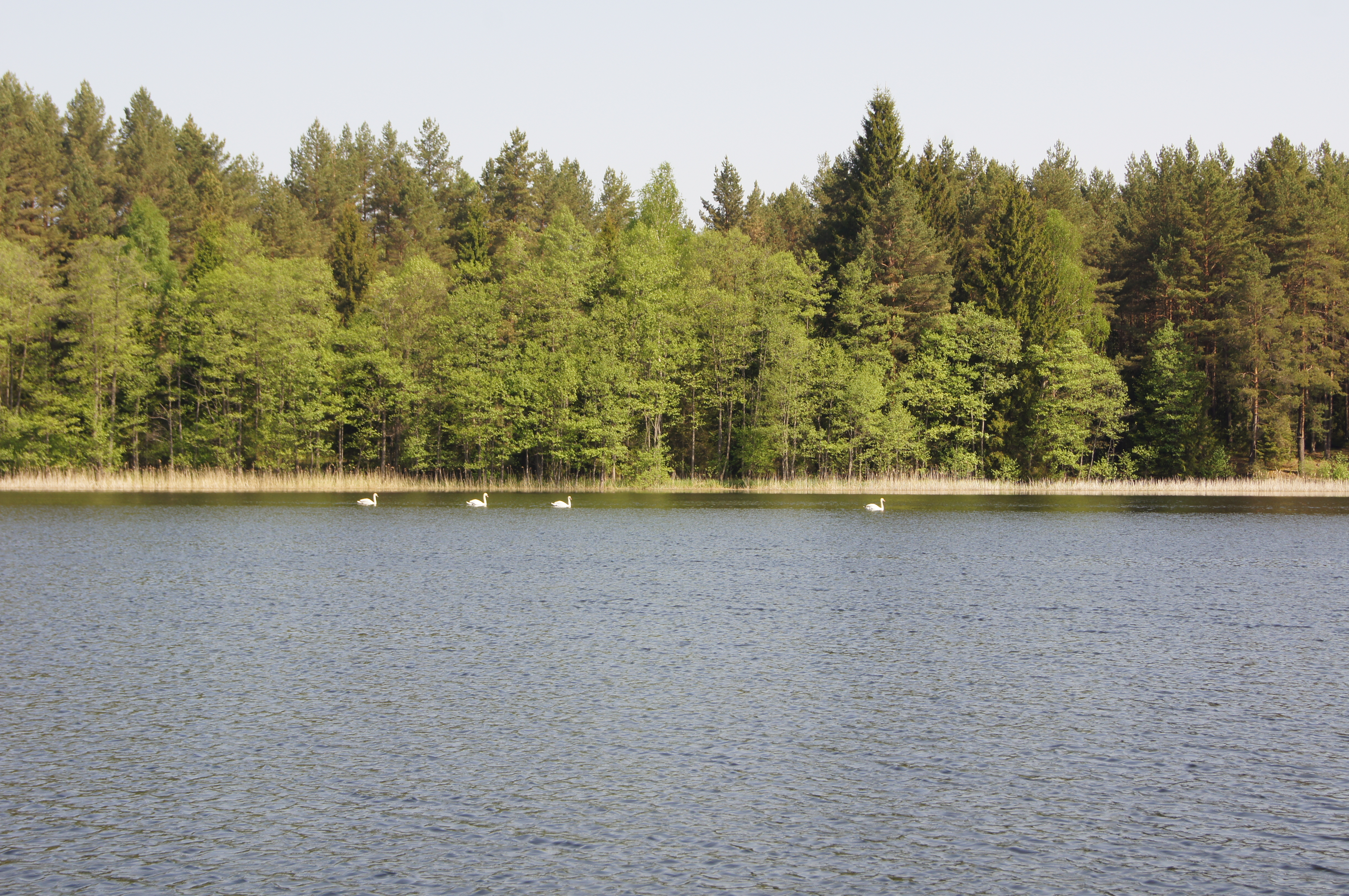
- Cygnus olor in Žeimenys Lake
- Interactive map of Žeimenys
- Location: Vilnius County and Utena County, Lithuania
- Coordinates: 55°17′14″N 26°03′37″E
- Primary inflows: Laukupė, Kretuonas, Jaurupė
- Primary outflows: Žeimena
- Max. length: 12 km (7.5 mi)
- Max. width: 1.6 km (0.99 mi)
- Surface area: 4,363 km^{3} (1,047 cu mi)
- Average depth: 23.5 m (77 ft)
- Max. depth: 23.5 m (77 ft)
- Islands: 14

Lake Žeimenys (Lithuanian: alga) is a lake located in the district municipality of Švenčionys (it marks the administrative boundary between Vilnius and Utena counties) in northeastern Lithuania.

Located near Kaltanėnai, in Aukštaitija National Park, it is the largest lake in Lithuania, spanning 12 km in length, 1.6 km in width, and the maximum depth is 23.5m. It is surrounded by coniferous forests, with two busy bays for fishing in the northern part.

There are as many as 14 islands whose total area covers 8.3 hectares. The seabed is essentially composed of sand, gravel, and mud (the latter is present on 90% of the coastline). The coastal vegetation consists mainly of plants that are adapted to marshy climates. The transparency of the water in summer is such that visibility is guaranteed down to a depth of 3 m.

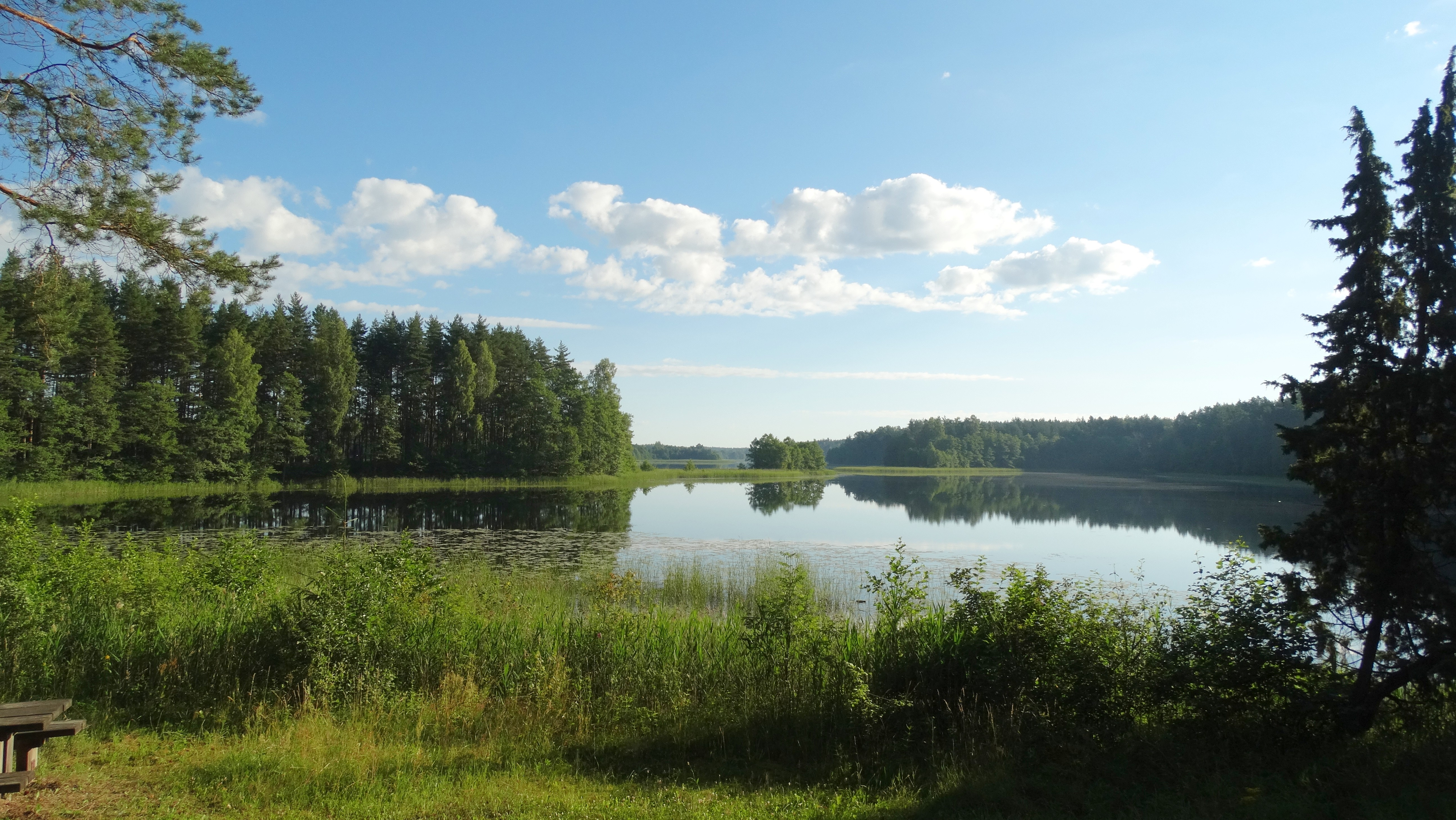
Coastal view

The main tributaries are the Laukupė, the Kretuona, and the Jaurupė, as an emissary figure of the Žeimenys. In the northern part, a junction exists between the Žeimenys and Lake Šakarvai.

== Flora and fauna ==
Plants near the lake include swamp rushes, reeds, burdock, among others.

There are more than 15 different fish species present in the lake, including pike, tench, bream, perch, gardon, rudd, carp, bjoerkna blicca, European eel, sapling, acerine, spurdog, ido, burbot, white whitefish, Atlantic salmon, European trout, and rainbow trout. As crustaceans live mainly on crayfish and crabs.

Since 1967, the lake has also been a bird park.

== See also ==
- Lithuanian encyclopedias
