= Asveja =

Lake in Lithuania

Lake Asveja
- Dubingiai Lake
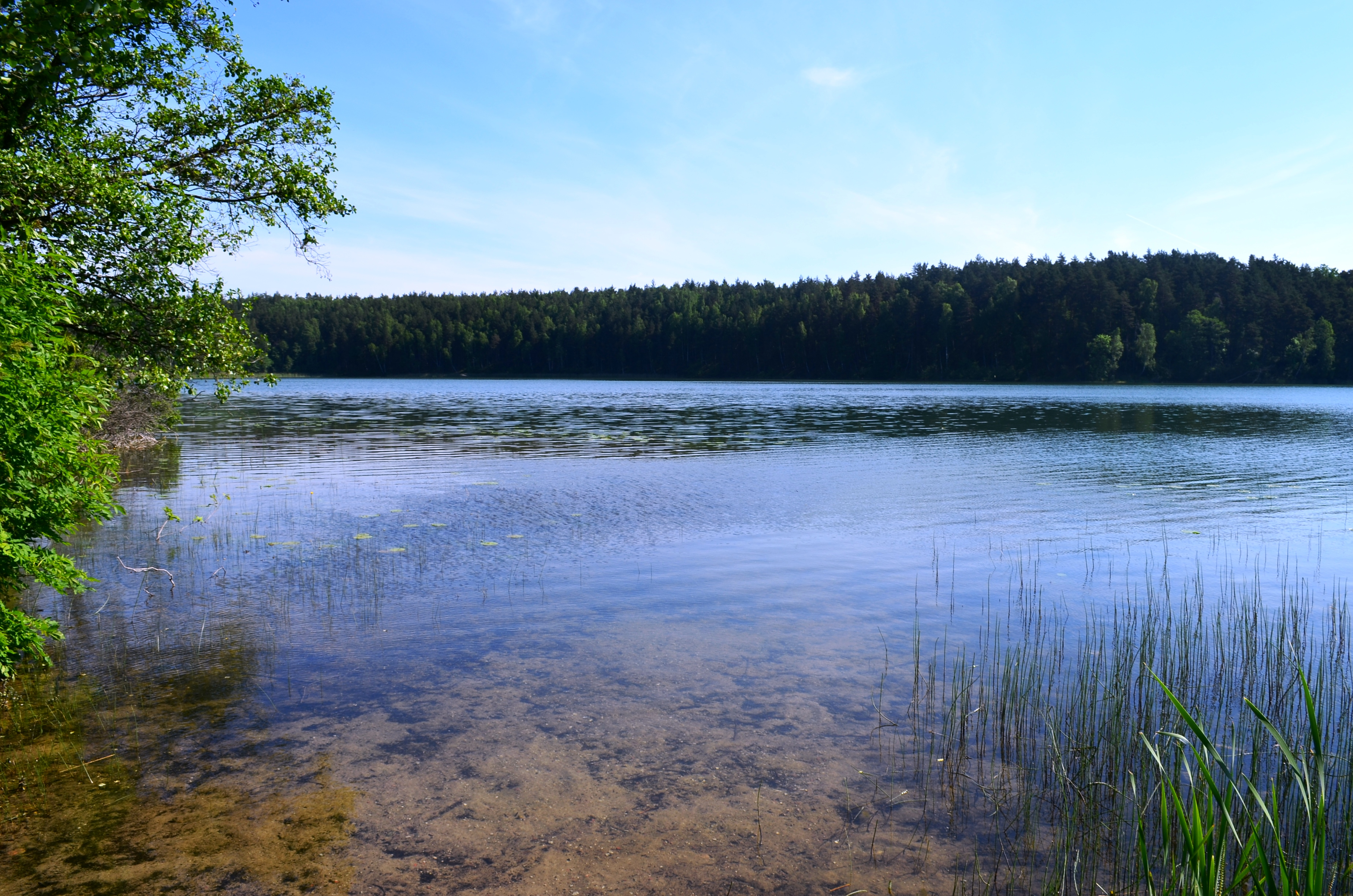
- Lake Asveja nearby Jonėnai village

- Location within Lithuania
- Location: Lithuania
- Coordinates: 55°02′35″N 25°30′17″E
- Primary outflows: Dubinga River
- Basin countries: Lithuania
- Max. length: 21.9 km (13.6 mi)
- Max. width: 880 m (2,890 ft)
- Surface area: 10.23 km^{2} (3.95 mi^{2})
- Average depth: 14.9 m (49 ft)
- Max. depth: 50.2 m (165 ft)
- Settlements: Dubingiai

Lake Asveja or Dubingiai Lake (Lithuanian: Asveja or Dubingių ežeras) is the longest lake in Lithuania (length: 21.9 km or 29.7 km counting the Žalktynė, Vyriogala and Dubingiai bights). It covers 9.78 km^{2} area and reaches a depth of 50.2m which makes it the third deepest lake in Lithuania. It lies partly in Molėtai district, Švenčionys district and Vilnius district. The alternative name comes from the historical Dubingiai Castle, constructed on the former island, and the small town of Dubingiai situated on the lake. The town is a popular tourist destination. Žeimena River flows south of the lake and people rent boats or kayaks to go down the river to the Neris River.

The lake formed when water flowed under the melting icecaps during the last glacial period. Such lakes are similar to rivers: they are long, narrow (the greatest width of Asveja is only 880 m.), and deep. Other such lakes in Lithuania include Tauragnas, Sartai and Aisetas. In 1992 Asveja Regional Park was established to protect the ecosystem and landscape.

One of the curiosities is a wooden bridge across the lake. The bridge is 84 m in length; the lake is up to 15 m in depth at that point. Opened in 1934, in a ceremony with President Antanas Smetona, it is considered the first wooden bridge across a lake in Lithuania, although a 1998 survey suggested that another bridge stood on the site in the 16th or 17th century. In 2019, a major repair project was announced; the underwater poles were to be replaced with metal, and new wooden posts, guardrails, and handrails installed above the water. During the repairs, the skeleton of a 16th-century soldier, whose boots and weapons were remarkably well-preserved, was found in 9 m of water. According to archeologist Elena Pranckėnaitė, "For now, we assume that those discovered human remains could be linked with the former bridge leading to Dubingiai Castle, which was situated on the hilltop on the shore of Asveja Lake."
