= Ūkojas =

Lake in Ignalina District Municipality, Lithuania

Lake Ūkojas
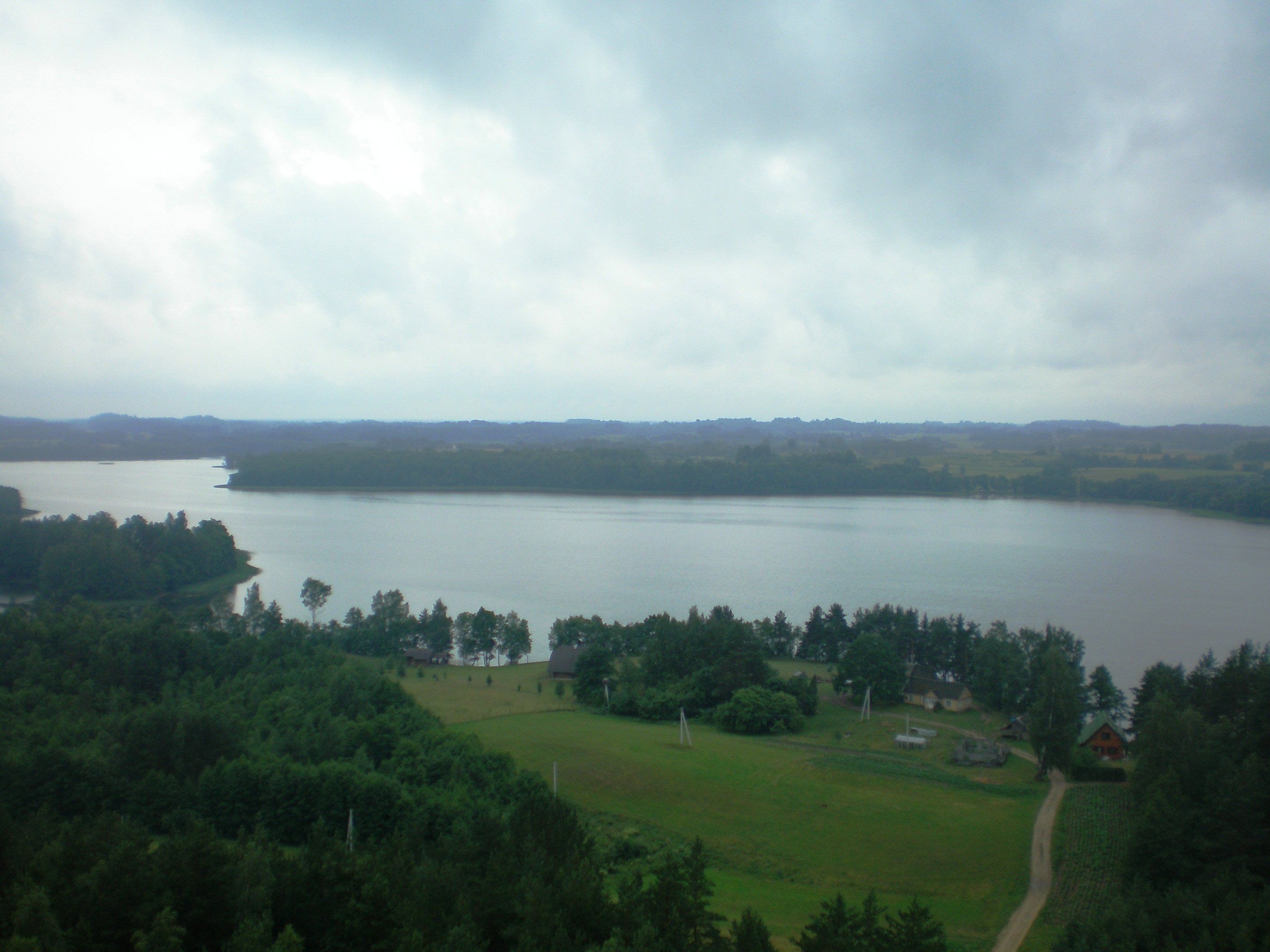
- Ūkojas lake

- Location within Lithuania
- Location: Ignalina district, Lithuania
- Coordinates: 55°22′10″N 25°58′25″E
- Primary outflows: Novena (to Alksnaitis)
- Catchment area: Žeimena
- Basin countries: Lithuania
- Max. length: 3.1 km (1.9 mi)
- Max. width: 1.1 km (0.68 mi)
- Surface area: 1.902 km^{2} (0.734 sq mi)
- Average depth: 11.3 m (37 ft)
- Max. depth: 30.5 m (100 ft)
- Islands: 2

Lake Ūkojas is a lake in the Ignalina district, eastern Lithuania. It is located in the Aukštaitija National Park, about 12 kilometres (7.5 mi) west of Ignalina. The lake connects with Lake Alksnaitis and Lake Pakasas.
