= Ginučiai =

- Village
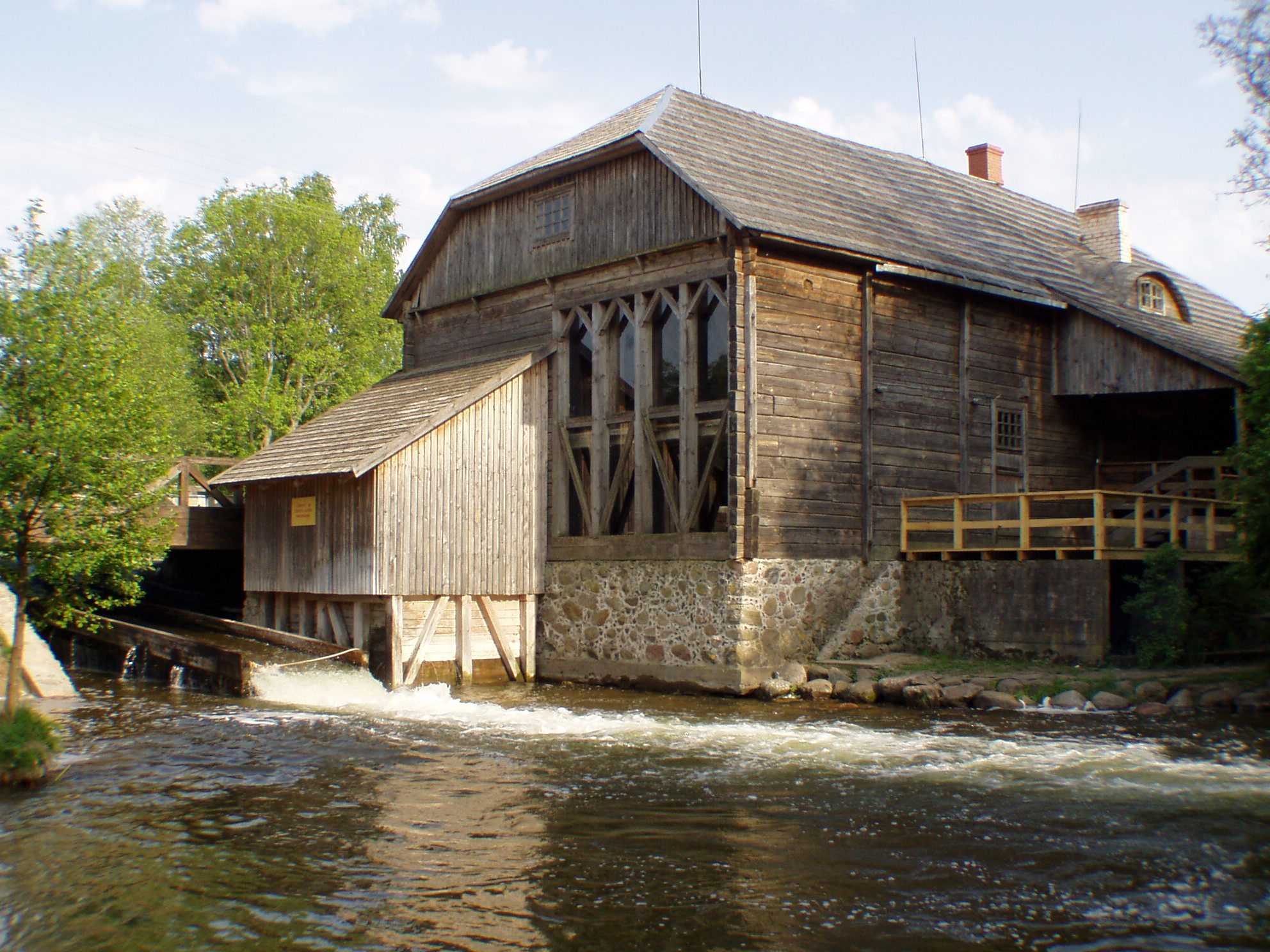
- Watermill in Ginučiai

- Location of Ginučiai
- Coordinates: 55°23′07″N 25°59′41″E
- Country: Lithuania
- Ethnographic region: Aukštaitija
- County: Utena County
- Municipality: Ignalina district municipality
- Eldership: Linkmenai eldership

Population (2011)
  - Total: 44
- Time zone: UTC+2 (EET)
  - Summer (DST): UTC+3 (EEST)

Ginučiai is a village on the shore of the Lake Linkmenas in the Aukštaitija National Park, Ignalina district of Lithuania. According to the 2011 census, its population was 44. It is best known for its 19th-century watermill. It is one of the few mills in Lithuania that survive with the original mechanism. Ginučiai watermill is declared a monument of engineering.

Ginučiai village is quite popular touring place in the Eastern Lithuania.

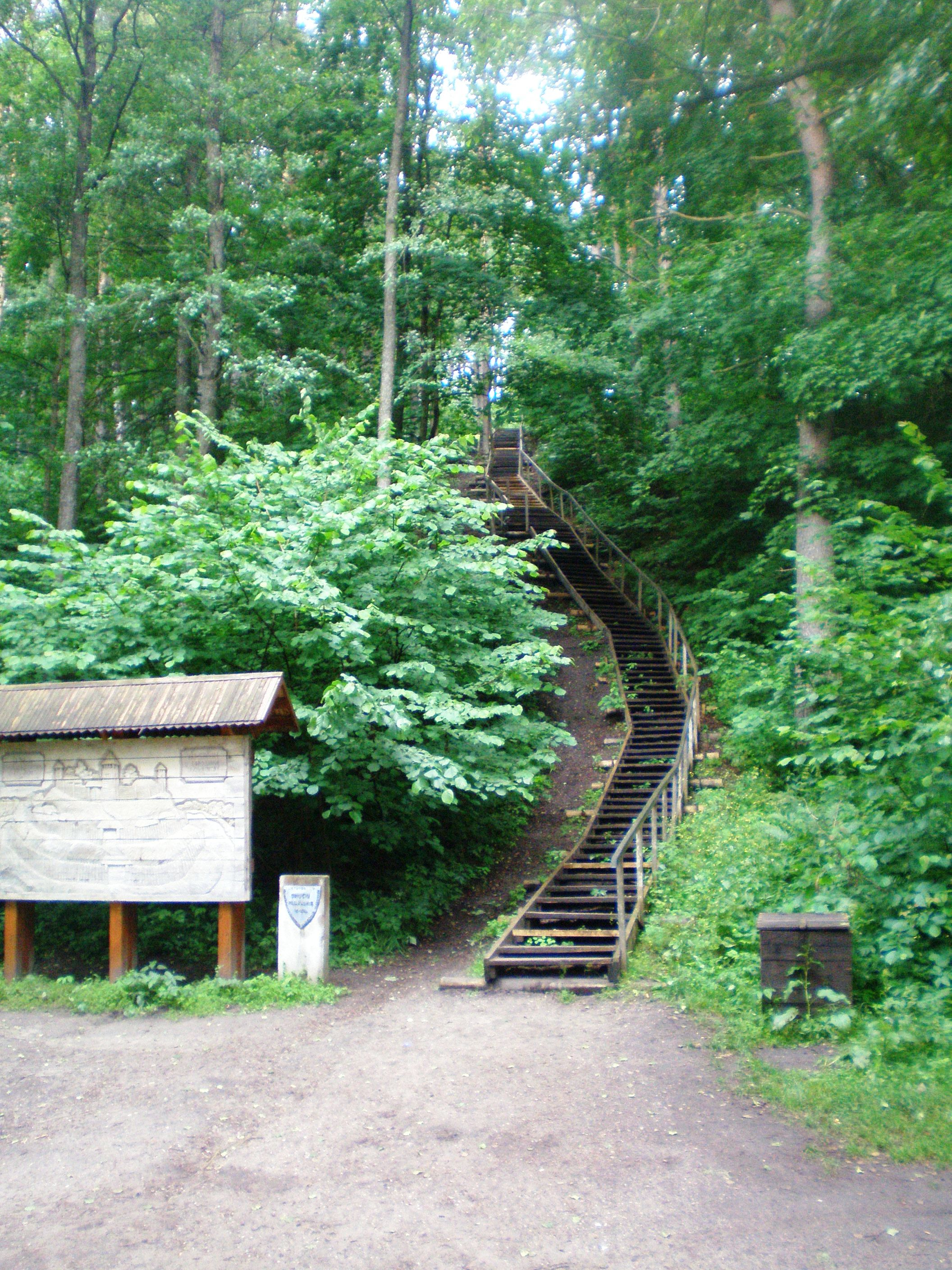
Ginučiai castle hill
