= Šakarvai =

Lake in Lithuania

Lake Šakarvai
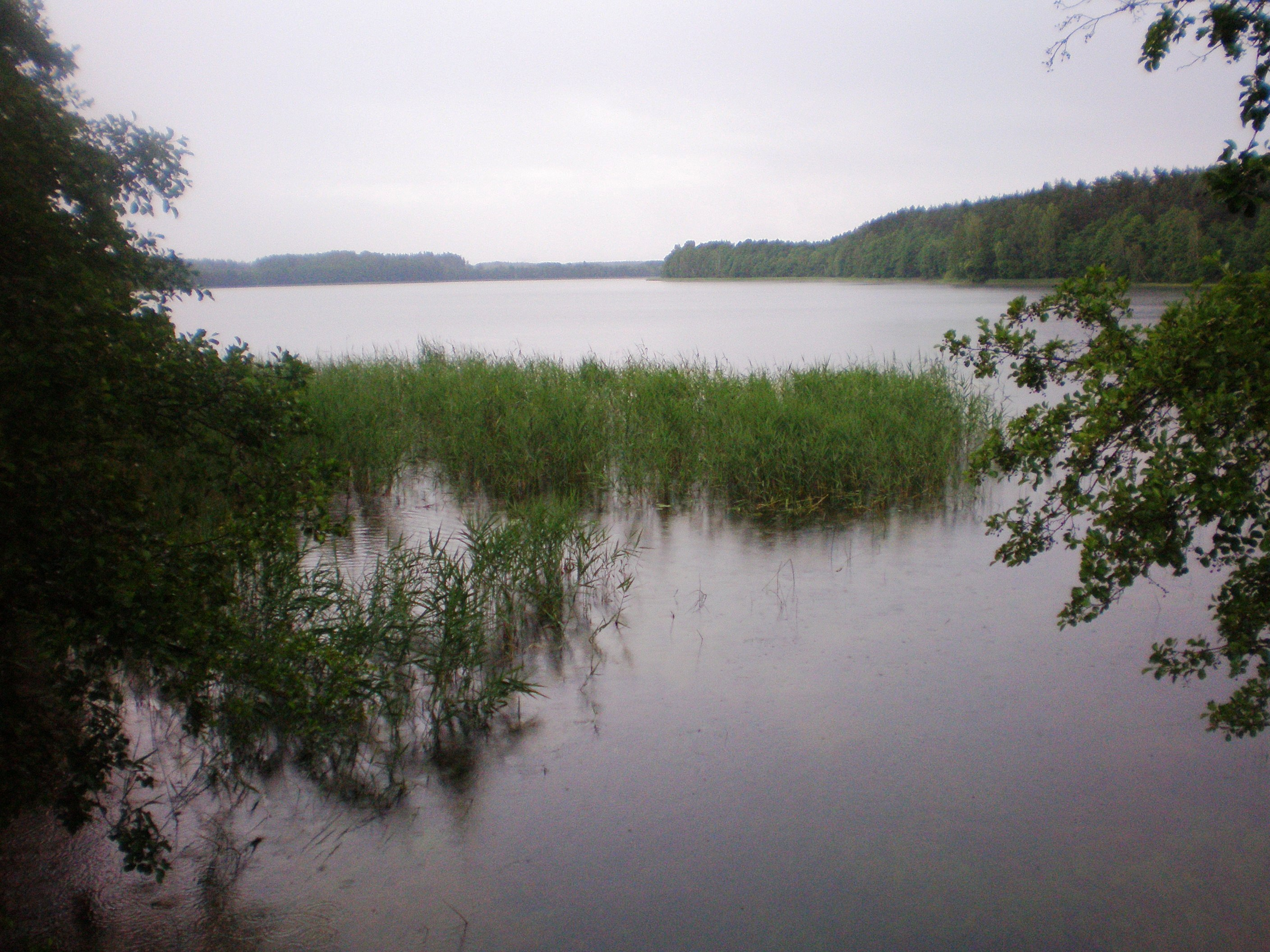
- Šakarvai lake near Šakarva village

- Location within Lithuania
- Interactive map of Lake Šakarvai
- Location: Ignalina district, Lithuania
- Coordinates: 55°19′11″N 26°3′30″E
- Catchment area: Žeimena
- Basin countries: Lithuania
- Max. length: 2.2 km (1.4 mi)
- Max. width: 0.5 km (0.31 mi)
- Surface area: 0.79 km^{2} (0.31 sq mi)
- Average depth: 18.5 m (61 ft)
- Max. depth: 40 m (130 ft)
- Settlements: Šakarva, Drutūnai

Šakarvai Lake is in the Ignalina district of eastern Lithuania, Aukštaitija National Park, about 2.5 kilometres (1.6 mi) southwest of Palūšė village. The lake connects with Lake Lūšiai and Lake Žeimenys.

== Sources ==
- Jonas Zinkus; et al., eds. (1988). "Simno-Žvorūnė". Tarybų Lietuvos enciklopedija (in Lithuanian). Vol. 4. Vilnius, Lithuania: Vyriausioji enciklopedijų redakcija.
