= Asveja Regional Park =

Lithuanian regional park

Coordinates: 55.05°N 25.53°E

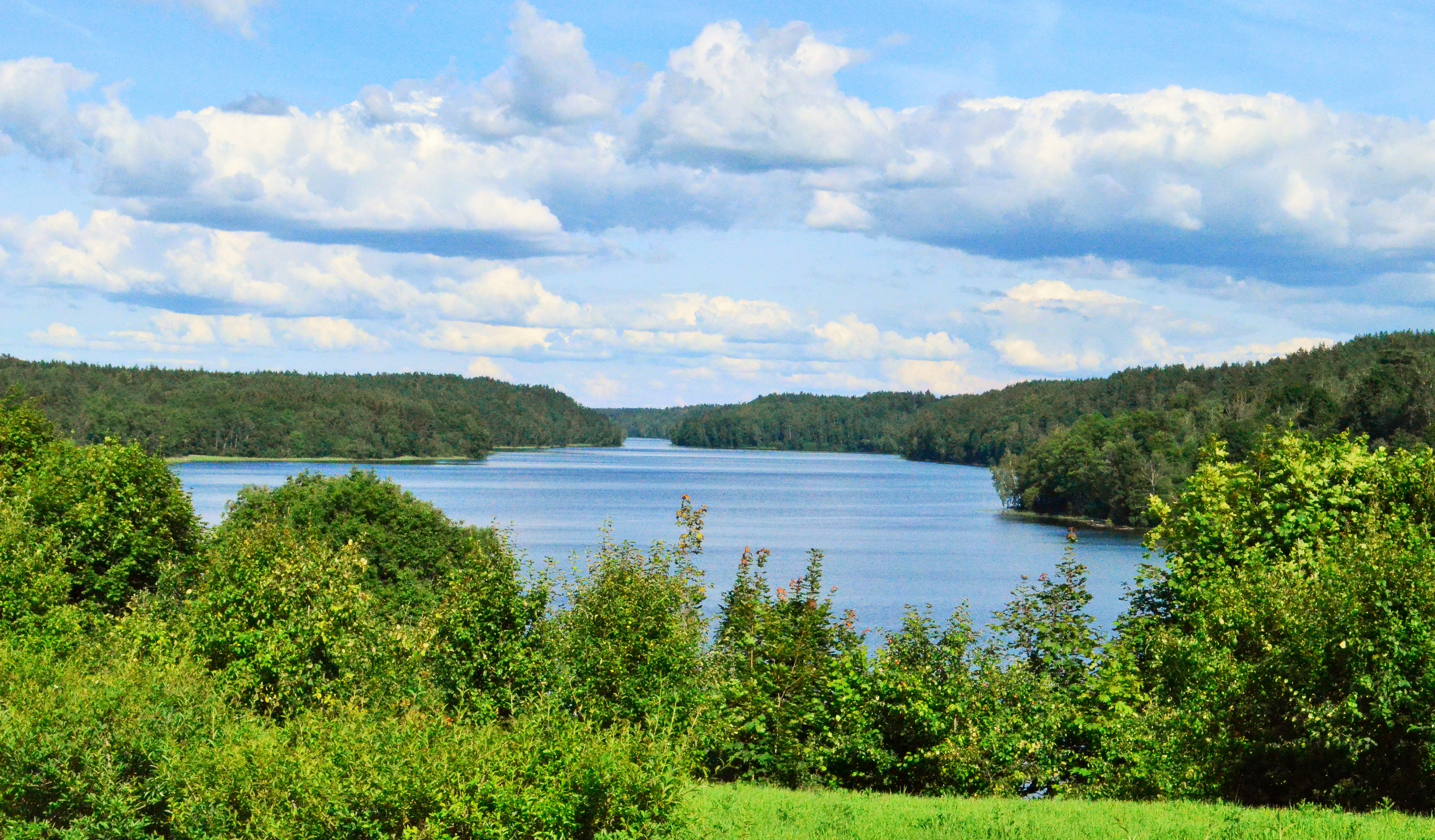
Landscape view of Lake Asveja

Asveja Regional Park, established in 1992, covers 12,208 hectares in east-central Lithuania near the town of Dubingiai. It protects a glacial landscape that includes over 30 lakes. Wetlands comprise about 8% of its territory, forests 60%, lakes 17%.

The park also contains the Dubingiai Mound and castle site, burial grounds, several villages, and a historic schoolhouse.
