= Prorva (disambiguation) =

Prorva may refer to:

- Prorva, a village until 1998 in the Neftchala Rayon of Azerbaijan
- Prorva, Atyrau, Kazakhstan
- Prorva Channel, a channel in the Danube delta, in Ukraine
- Prorva (film), a.k.a. Moscow Parade, a 1992 Russian film
- Prorva (river), a river in Belarus
