= Linkmenas =

Lake in Lithuania

Lake Linkmenas
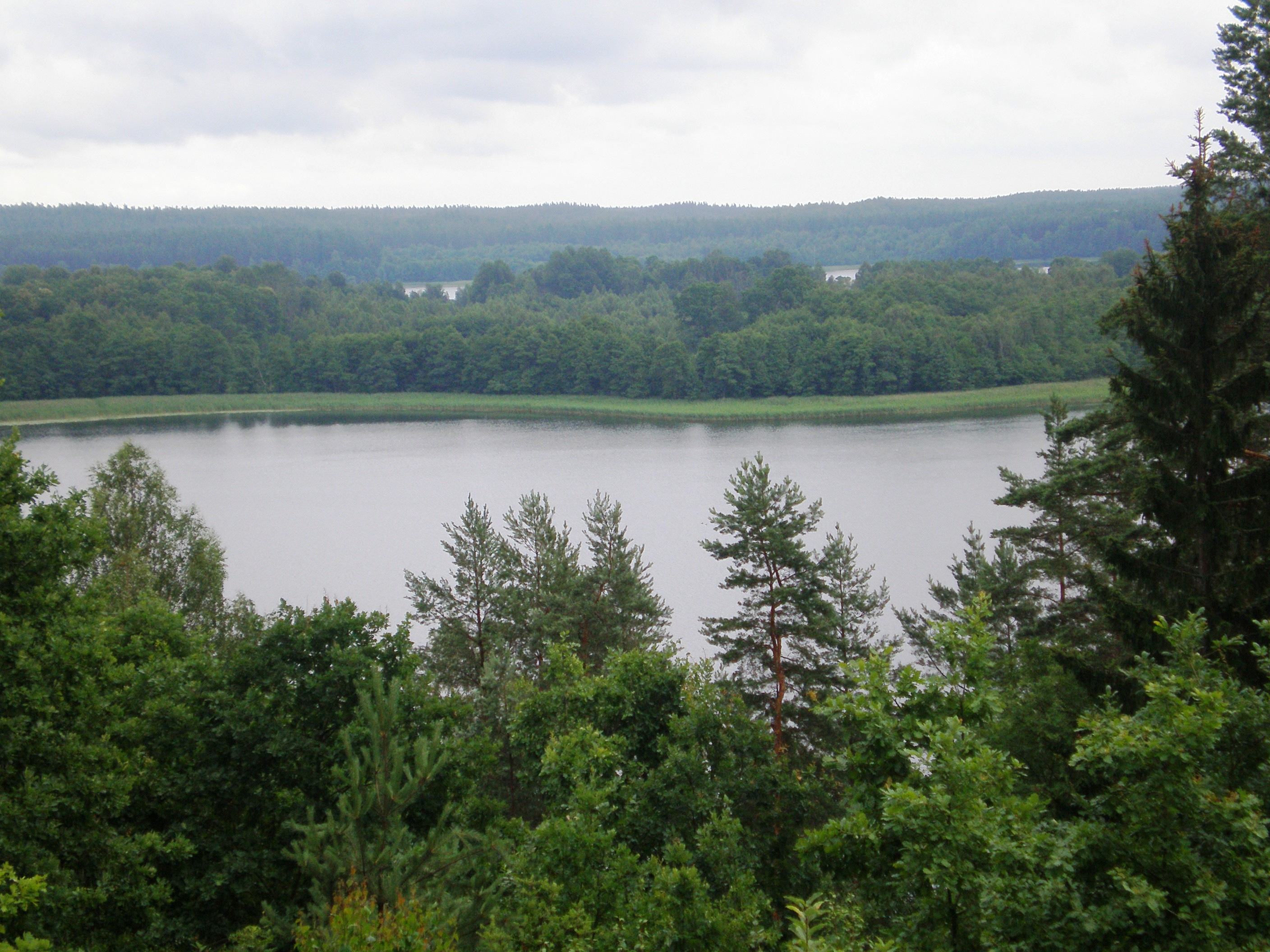

- Location within Lithuania
- Location: Aukštaitija National Park, Ignalina District
- Coordinates: 55°22′0″N 25°59′43″E
- Basin countries: Lithuania
- Max. length: 2,300 m (7,500 ft)
- Max. width: 600 m (2,000 ft)
- Surface area: 75 ha (190 acres)
- Settlements: Ginučiai

Lake Linkmenas is a lake in Aukštaitija National Park, Ignalina District, Lithuania. It is 2,300 metres long and 600 metres wide. Linkmenas is part of a chain of seven interconnected lakes. The only major settlement on the shore is Ginučiai, which has an old watermill.
