= Drūkšiai =

Lake in Belarus and Lithuania

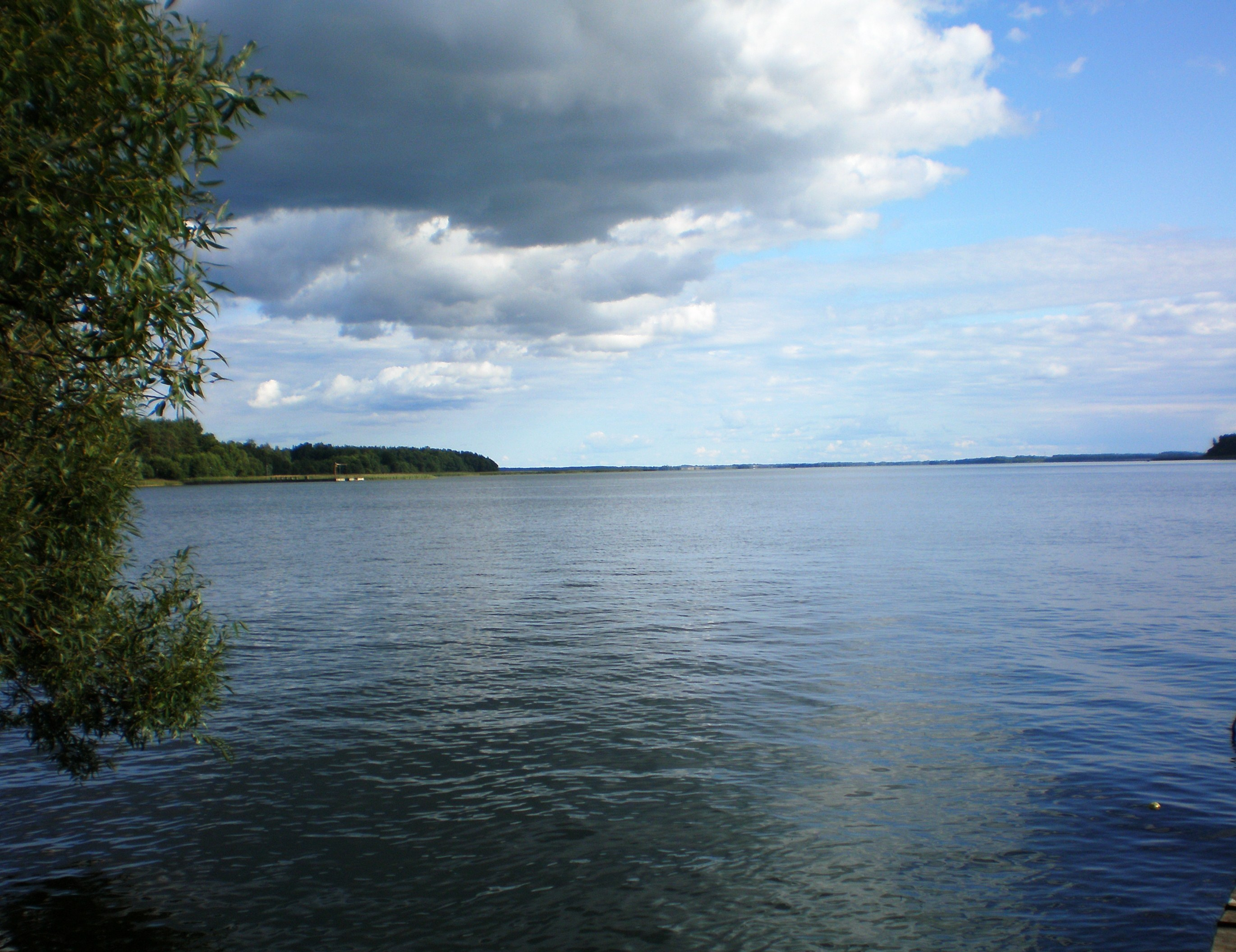
- Lake Drūkšiai in Lithuania, at Tilžė village

- Location within Lithuania Location within Belarus
- Coordinates: 55°37′17″N 26°36′21″E
- Primary outflows: Prorva
- Catchment area: 613 km^{2} (237 mi^{2})
- Basin countries: Lithuania, Belarus
- Surface area: 44.79 km^{2} (17.29 mi^{2})
- Average depth: 7.6 m (25 ft)
- Max. depth: 33.3 m (109 ft)
- Surface elevation: 141.6 m (465 ft)

Drūkšiai (Lithuanian pronunciation: [[ˈdɾuːkʃʲɛɪ̯]]), also called Drysviaty or Drysvyaty, or Drisvyaty (Belarusian: Дрысвяты, pronounced [drɨˈsʲvʲatɨ]; Russian: Дрисвяты) is the largest of the Braslau lakes located partly in the northeastern part of Lithuania and partly in the Vitebsk Voblast, in Belarus. The lake water was used to cool the reactors of Lithuania's now decommissioned Ignalina Nuclear Power Plant.

The greatest depth of the lake is 33.3 m, and the average depth is 7.6 m. The basin of the lake was formed during the movement of the glaciers by two perpendicular channels, which expanded north to south and west to east. The maximum depth of the first channel is 29 m, and of the second is 33.3 m. The greatest depths are located near the middle of the lake. The shallowest part is on the south ridge of the lake, its depth is approximately between 3 and 7 meters.

Six small rivers flow into the lake, and one dammed river flows out.

== See also ==
- Lakes of Lithuania
- Prorva River
