= Dubingiai Castle =

Former castle in Dubingiai, Lithuania

Coordinates: 55.060°N 25.442°E

- Dubingių pilis
- Dubingiai, Lithuania
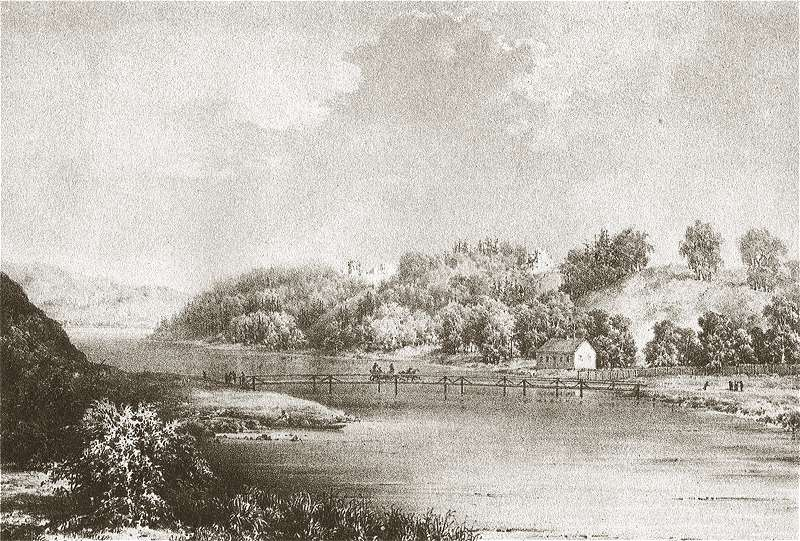
- The remains of Dubingiai Castle on the island, an 1870 drawing by Napoleon Orda

Site information
- Type: Renaissance
- Condition: the foundations have survived

Site history
- Built: 1413 early 16th century
- Demolished: late 17th century - early 20th century

Dubingiai Castle (Lithuanian: Dubingių pilis) was a residential castle in Dubingiai, Molėtai district, Lithuania.

== History ==
The first masonry castle was constructed by Vytautas, Grand Duke of Lithuania, in 1412-1413 on an island, now a peninsula, in Lake Asveja in order to secure the capital Vilnius from attacks from Livonia. No accounts concerning the architecture of Vytautas' castle have survived. It was acquired by Jerzy Radziwiłł (Jurgis Radvila) prior to 1508. He constructed a new palace in the Renaissance style in the first half of the 16th century. After the death of Jerzy, his son Mikolaj "the Red" inherited the property, causing the town nearby to become an important hub for the Reformation in Lithuania. Barbara Radziwiłł (Barbora Radvilaitė) spent five months in the castle after her marriage to Sigismund Augustus in 1547. The palace used to be one of the most luxurious residences in the Grand Duchy, lagging not much behind the Royal Palace. Dubingiai Castle was the main seat of the Biržai-Dubingiai line of the Radziwiłł (Radvilos) family until the second half of the 17th century, when it was transferred to Biržai Castle.

During the Polish–Lithuanian-Swedish wars, the castle was pillaged by armies loyal to the King of Poland and Grand Duke of Lithuania. It was confiscated from Bogusław Radziwiłł (Boguslavas Radvila). It returned to the family in the second half of the 17th century. The neglected castle and church gradually fell into ruins. It was sold to Michał Tyszkiewicz (Mykolas Tiškevičius) in 1808. Today only the foundations and several cellars of the castle and church remain and are being researched.

The masonry Calvinist Church of the Holy Spirit was built in the Renaissance style near the castle by Janusz Radziwiłł (Jonušas Radvila) prior to 1620 and was intended to be the mausoleum of the Radziwiłł family. The most prominent members of the family were interred there, including Mikołaj "the Black" Radziwiłł (Mikalojus Radvila Juodasis) in 1565 and his wife Elżbieta Szydłowiecka in 1562, Mikołaj "the Red" Radziwiłł (Mikalojus Radvila Rudasis) in 1584 and Janusz Radziwiłł in 1620. Their remains were discovered during archaeological excavations in 2004 and reburied there on 5 September 2009.

== Rebuilding ==
In 2024 a fund "Dubingių pilies fondas" was established with a goal to rebuild the castle in the near future, possibly until 2034 when the city of Dubingiai will celebrate a 700th jubilee of first mentioning. The idea of the restoration is actively supported by the representative of the Radvila family, Duke Motiejus Radvila (Maciej Radziwill), who is among the founders of the fund, along with Prof. Albinas Kuncevičius, Dr. Vydas Dolinskas, who was in charge of the restoration of the Palace of the Grand Dukes, and Molėtai District Municipality.

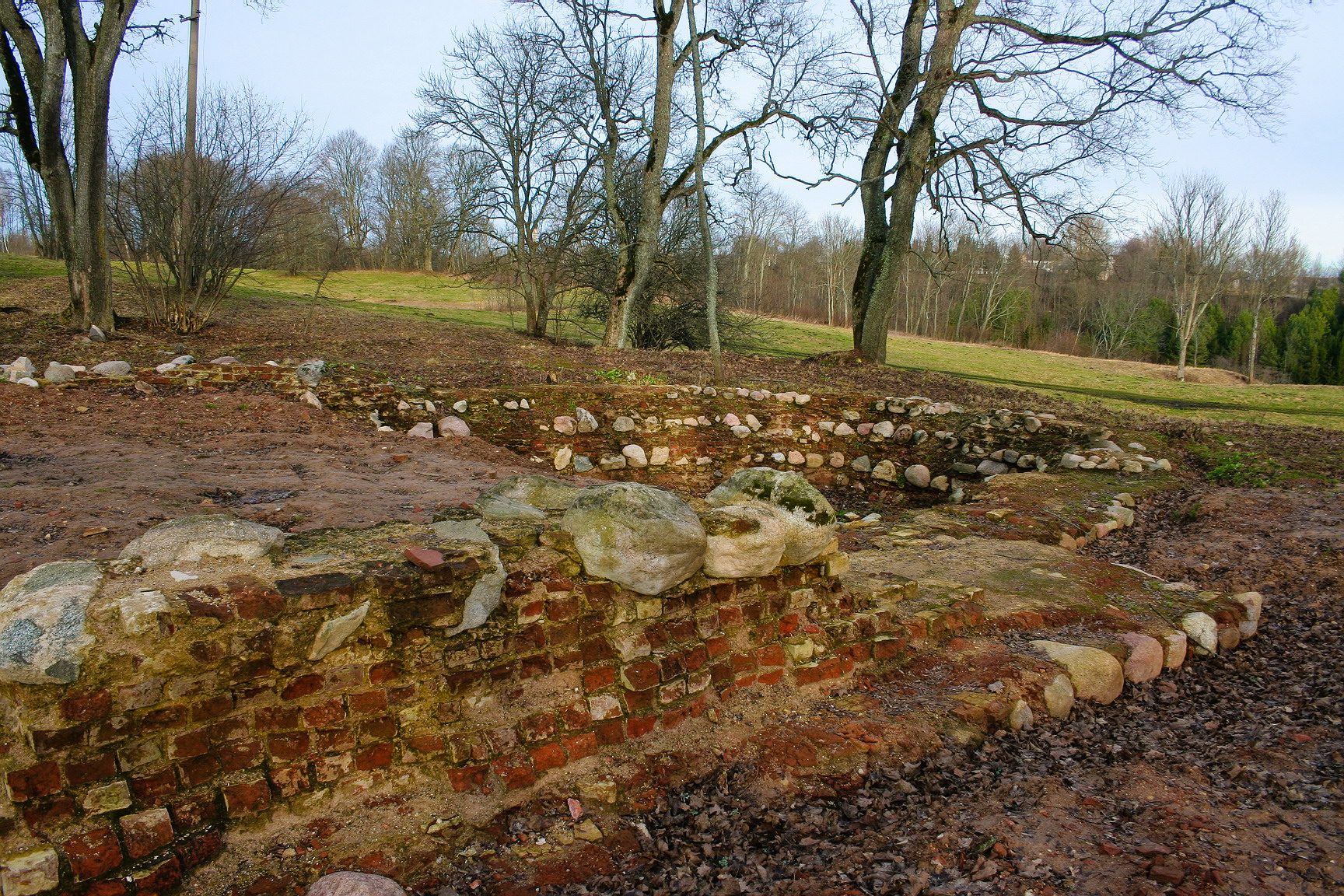
The remains of the church after the excavations

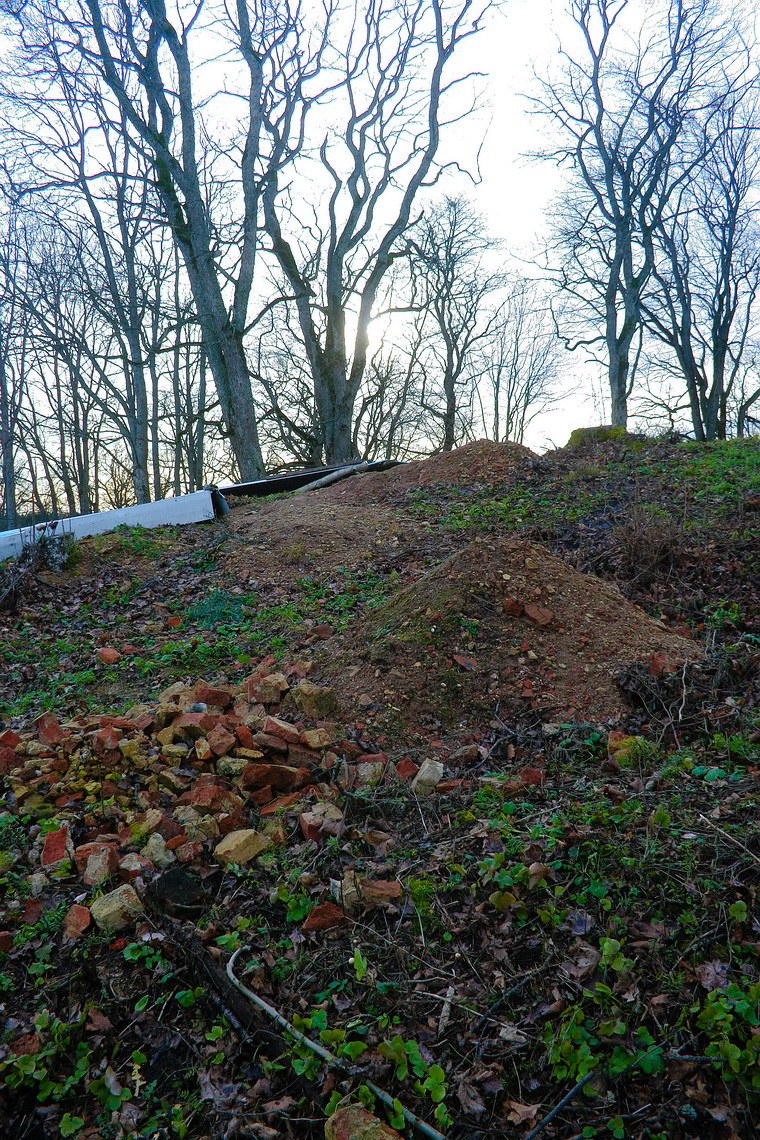
The excavations at the castle site in 2007

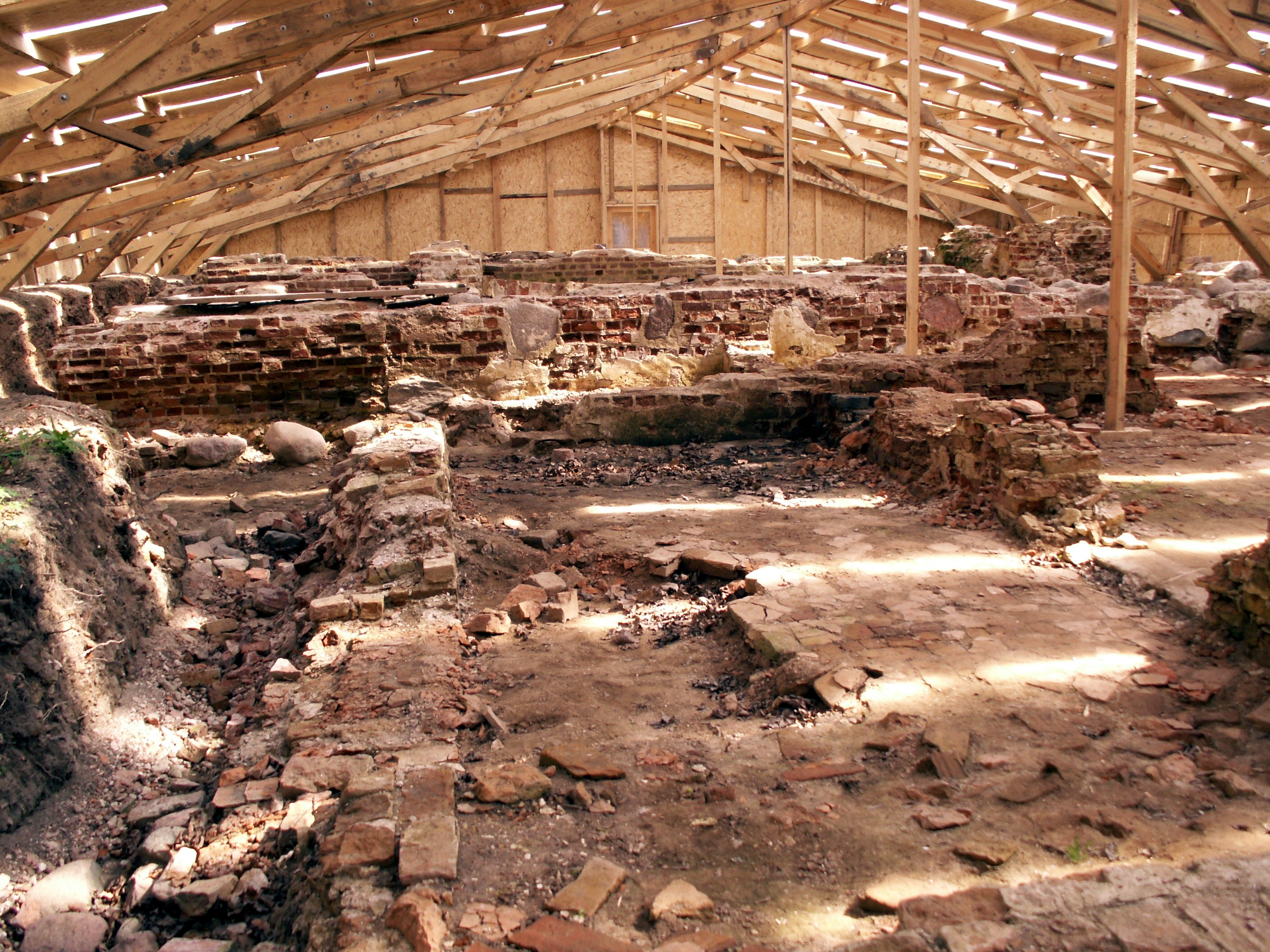
Excavated castle foundations in 2009

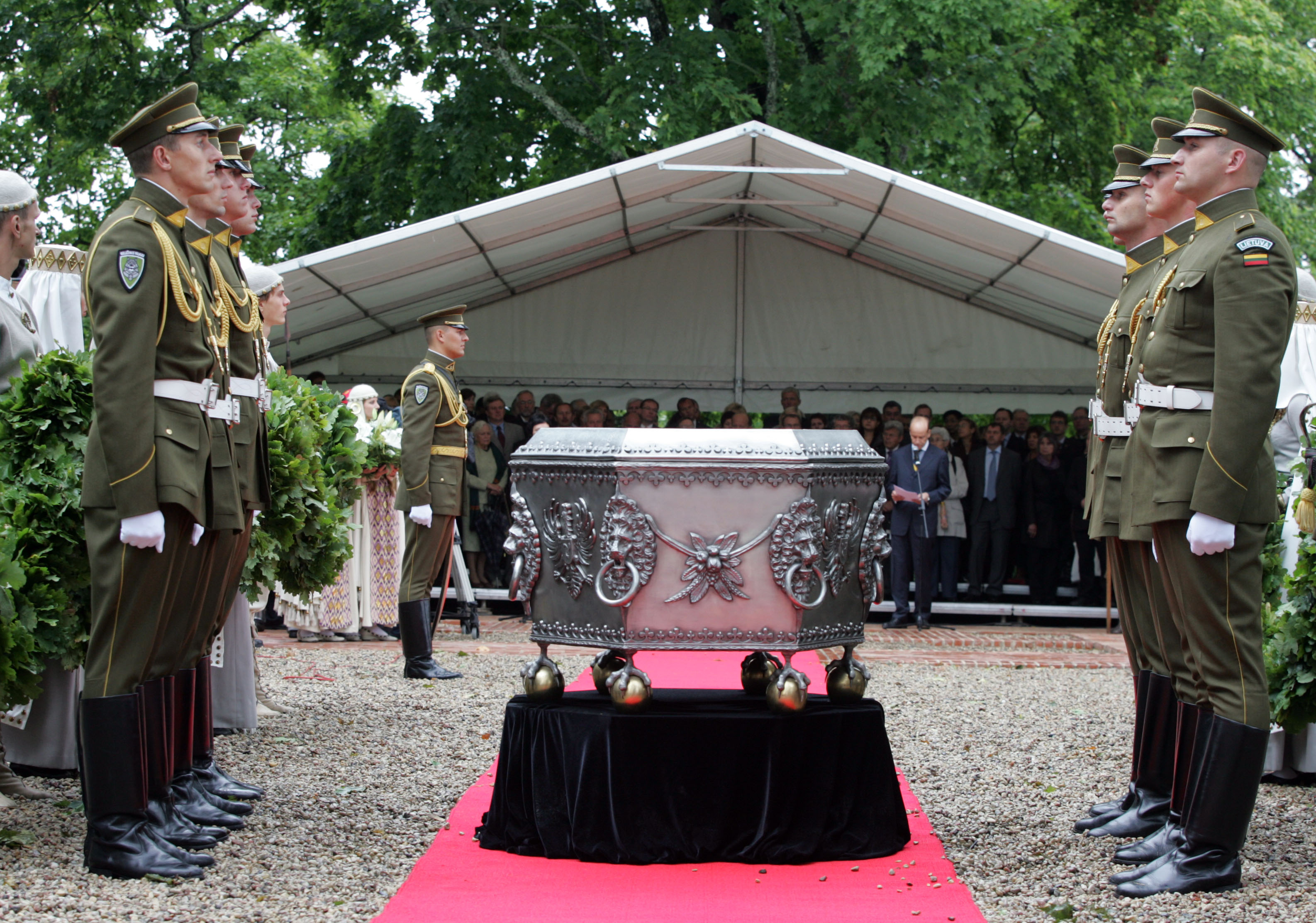
Reburial ceremony of Radvilas, 2009

== See also ==
- List of castles in Lithuania
