= Sartai =

Lake in Lithuania

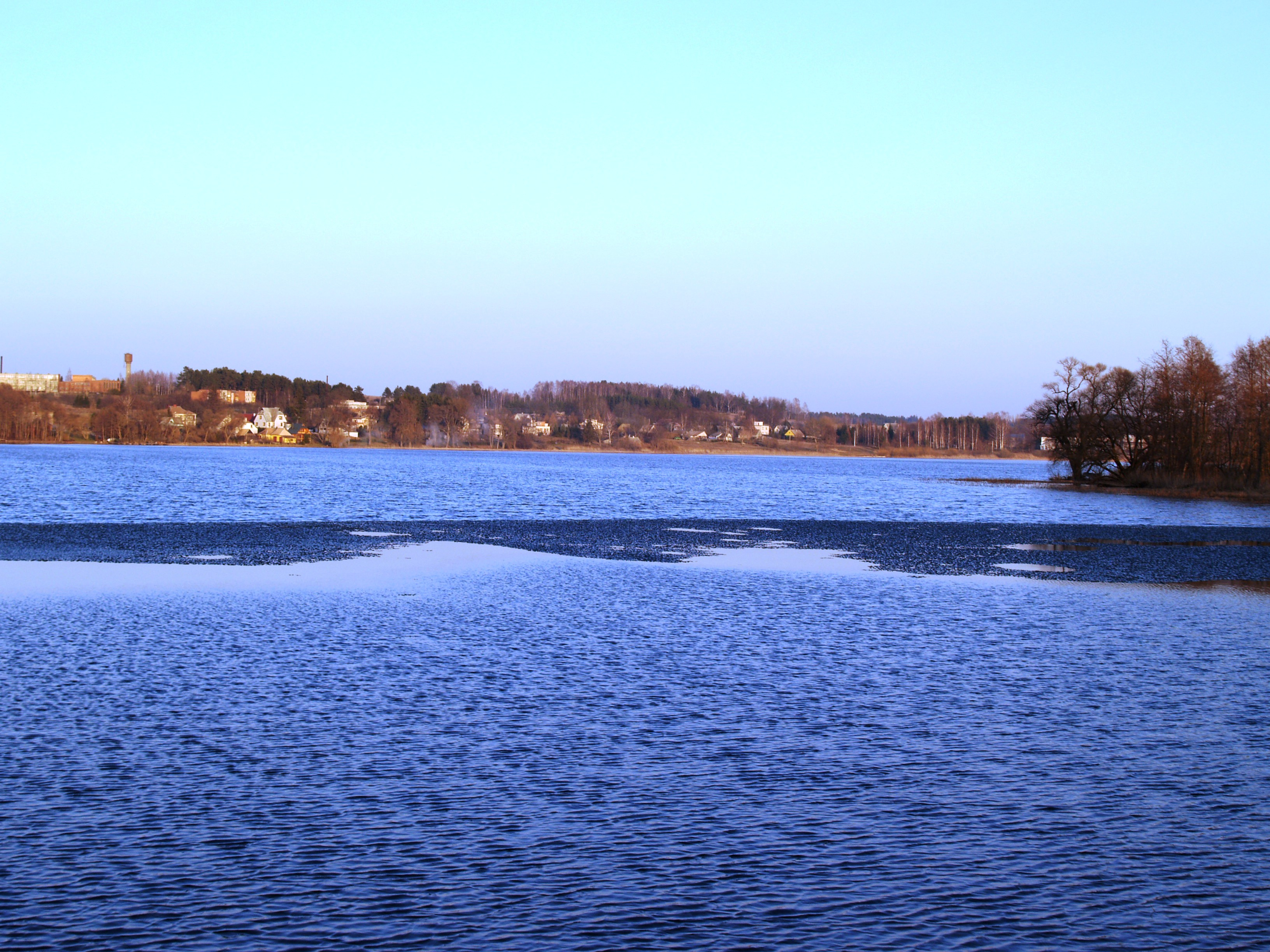

- Location within Lithuania
- Location: Rokiškis and Zarasai
- Coordinates: 55°48′51″N 25°49′10″E
- Primary inflows: Šventoji
- Primary outflows: Šventoji
- Basin countries: Lithuania
- Surface area: 13.32 km^{2} (5.14 sq mi)
- Average depth: 5.7 m (19 ft)
- Max. depth: 20.9 m (69 ft)
- Shore length^{1}: 79 km (49 mi)
- Islands: 6
- ^{1} Shore length is not a well-defined measure.

Sartai is a lake located in Rokiškis and Zarasai municipalities, northeastern Lithuania. There are six islands in the lake. River Šventoji flows through it.

Sartai is a glacial ribbon lake formed by six intersecting troughs, giving it a highly branched, tree-like shape. Its main western arms are Kalbutiškės, Audrakumpis (Ragava), and Kriaunakumpis (Lašė), while Bradesa (Zalva) extends east and Pasartis northeast. The total length of the branches is about 30 km. The basin area is 1,362.6 km², and the 79 km shoreline is the longest in Lithuania. Northern shores are high and steep; elsewhere they are mostly low. Forests surround the lake on both sides.

The lake was famous for the annual horse races that had been organized on the frozen lake near Dusetos. Nowadays this tradition is abandoned because of safety requirements. The race is organised at a hippodrome on the shore of the Sartai Lake.

== See Also ==
- List of lakes of Lithuania
- List of rivers of Lithuania
