= Tauragnas =

Lake in Lithuania

Lake Tauragnas
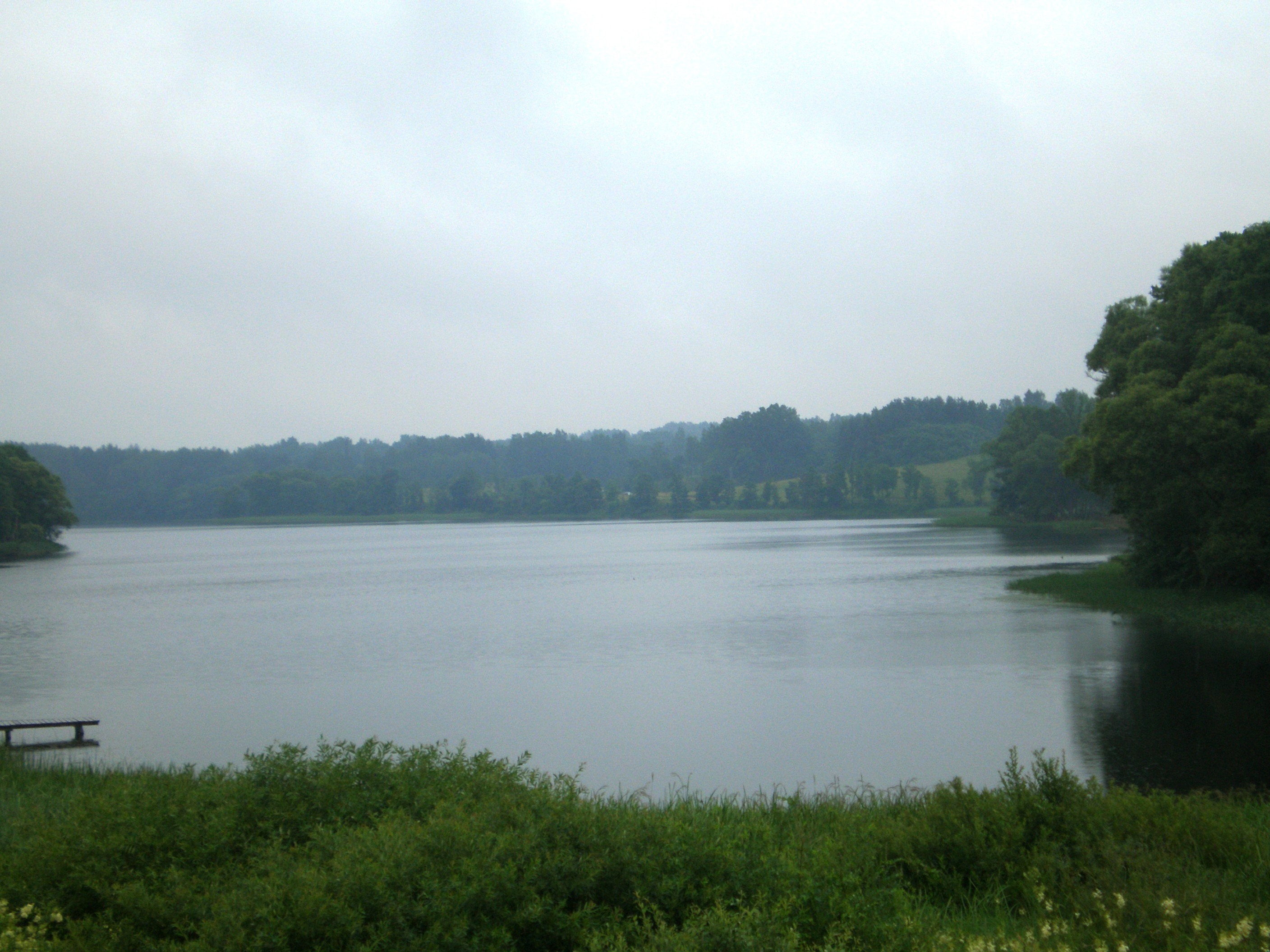
- Tauragnas lake near Tauragnai

- Location within Lithuania
- Coordinates: 55°26′17″N 25°52′47″E
- Basin countries: Lithuania
- Max. length: 9 km (5.6 mi)
- Max. width: 1 km (0.62 mi)
- Surface area: 5.13 km^{2} (1.98 mi^{2})
- Average depth: 18.7 m (61 ft)
- Max. depth: 62.1 m (204 ft)
- Settlements: Tauragnai

Tauragnas is the deepest lake in Lithuania reaching 62.5 metres of depth. The surface area is 5.13 km^{2} and average depth 18.7 m. It is situated in Aukštaitija National Park near Tauragnai in Utena County. This is also a lake with the highest altitude (above sea level) in Lithuania.

== See also ==
- Lakes of Lithuania
