= Prorva (river) =

River in Belarus

The Prorva is a small river in Braslaw District, Vitebsk Region, Belarus. It is a left tributary of the Drysvyata, which in turn is a tributary of the Dysna (Daugava basin). It flows for 12 km from Lake Drysvyaty by the village Drysvyaty, close to the former outlet of the river Drysvyata.

In 1953 a local hydroelectric plant "Friendship of Peoples" was constructed by the river. To feed it better, the outlet of the Drysvyata from Lake Drysvyaty was dammed for the whole northern discharge of the lake to go into the Prorva.
