= Lake Kretuonas =

Lake in eastern Lithuania

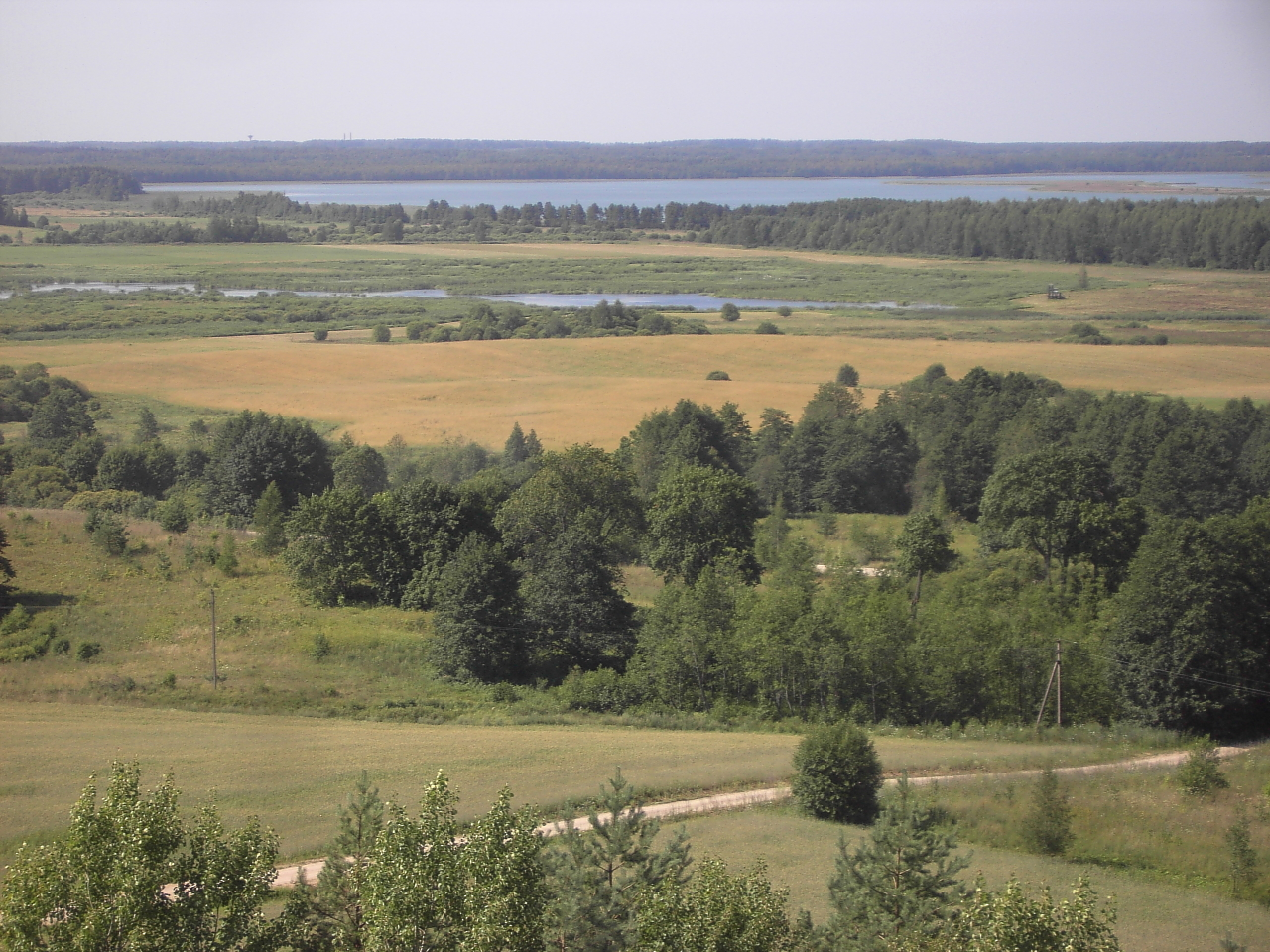
- Lake Kretuonas and the flooded meadows of Žemaitiškė as seen from the Lygumai viewing tower
- Interactive map of Lake Kretuonas
- Location: Vilnius County, Lithuania
- Coordinates: 55°15′18″N 26°4′48″E
- Type: Lake
- Primary inflows: Žaugėda, Pašaminė, Gylis, Kampupė, Vajuonėlė
- Primary outflows: Kretuona
- Catchment area: 154.7 km^{2} (59.7 sq mi)
- Max. length: 5 km (3.1 mi)
- Surface area: 8.61 km (5.35 mi)
- Average depth: 5.2 m (17 ft)
- Max. depth: 10.9 m (36 ft)
- Surface elevation: 145.2 m (476 ft)
- Islands: 6

Lake Kretuonas (sometimes Kretuonis) is a lake located in the District Municipality of Švenčionys (Vilnius County) in eastern Lithuania. It is the largest by area in both the district and the Aukštaitija National Park (8.61 square kilometers). The lake is a bird reserve. The Vilnius-Daugavpils railway line passes by the shores of the lake.

== Name ==
The word Kretuonas comes from the Selonian-era term kretėti ("to fidget, to struggle").

== Geology ==
The length of the lake from north to south is 5 km. The height above sea level is 145.2 m. The maximum depth is 10.9 m, and the average depth is 5.2 m. The catchment area measures 154.7 km², while the coasts surround the Kretuonas for 16.6 km. The shorelines are shallow and flat: in the south and southwest, the coast is mostly marshy, unlike the northwest, where forests extend. There are six islands in the lake, two larger than the other four, covering 25.5 hectares.

== Geography ==
The most important population centers near the body of water are Reškutėnai in the east and Kretuonys in the southwest.

== History ==
The surroundings of the lake have long been inhabited. Archaeologists Algirdas Girininkas and Egidijus Šatavičius in recent decades have identified eight Iron Age megaliths in this area, as well as some Stone and Bronze Age remains.

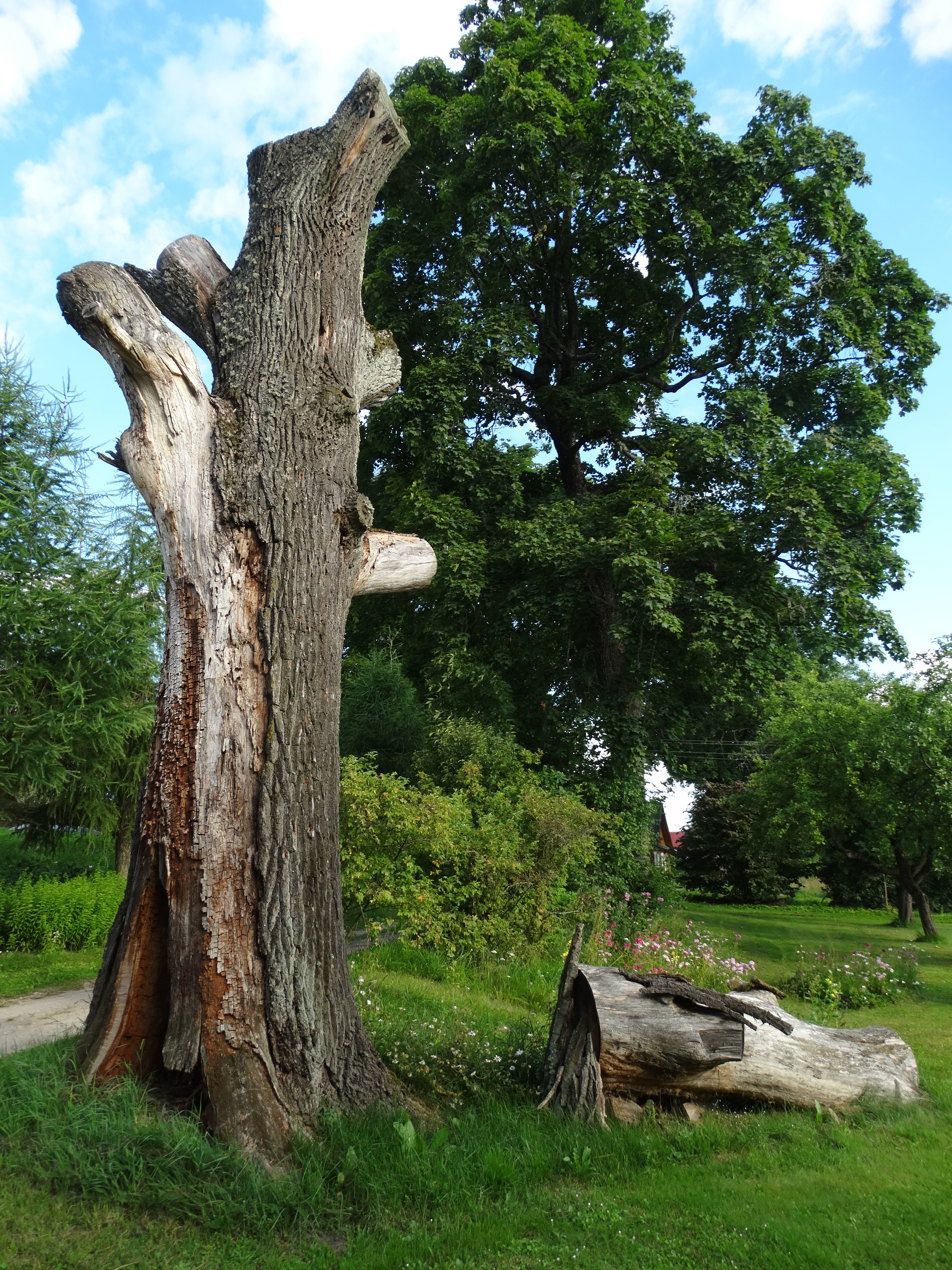
These oak remains have been recognized as Lithuanian national heritage because of their age.

== Nature 2000 ==
In addition to being part of one of Lithuania's most important national parks, Aukštaitija, Kretuonas has become part of the areas protected by the European Natura 2000 project, which aims to protect and conserve habitats and animal and plant species. The area has earned this recognition because of the very numerous presence of protected bird species, such as the little grebe (Podiceps nigricollis), the glossy warbler (Chlidonias niger), the gadwall (Mareca strepera), the common quail (Coturnix coturnix), the meadowlark (Porzana porzana), the corncrake (Crex crex), the common croaker (Gallinago media), the black-tailed godwit (Limosa limosa) and others.

The project, initiated at the community and national level, has attracted tourists to visit this botanically, ornithologically, and fish-rich area.
