= Dubingiai =

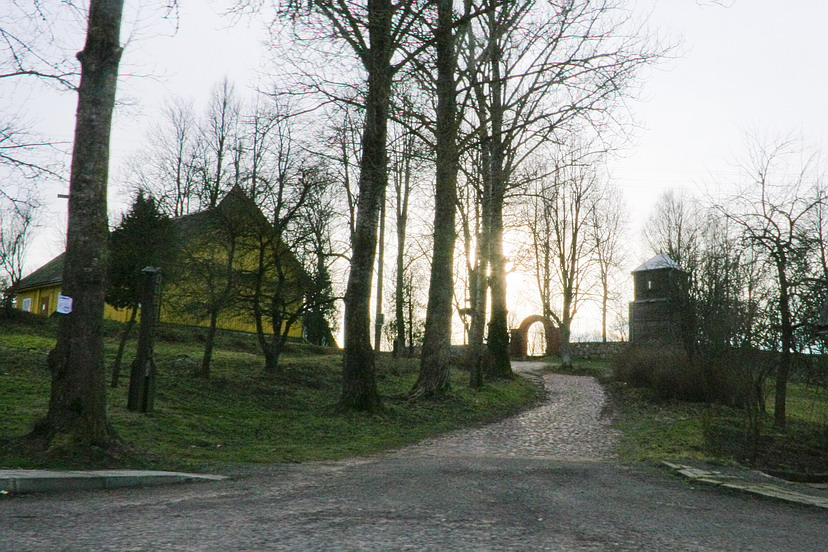
- The church in Dubingiai

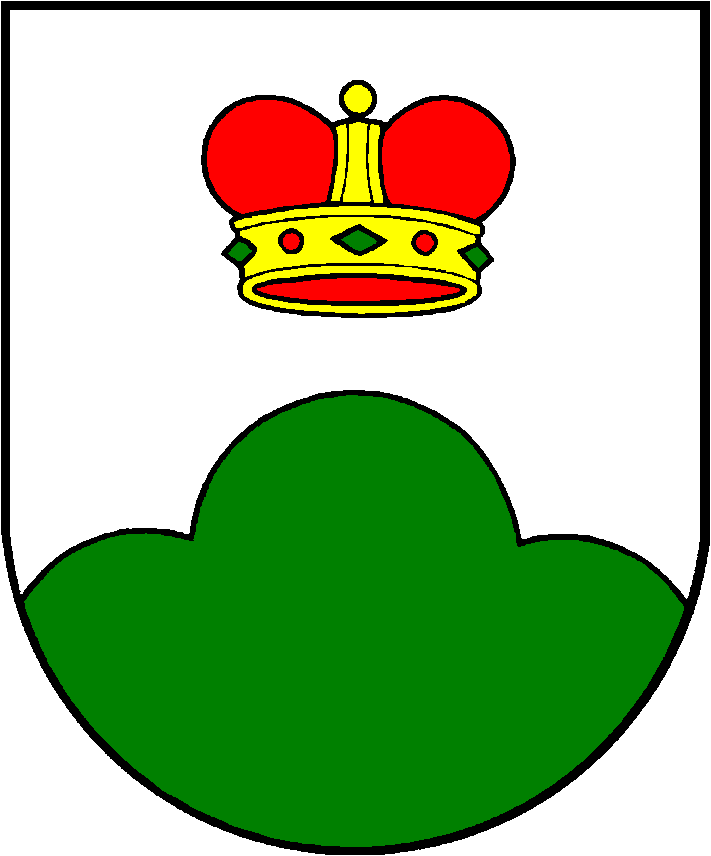
- Coat of arms

- Location of Dubingiai
- Coordinates: 55°03′40″N 25°27′00″E
- Country: Lithuania
- Ethnographic region: Aukštaitija
- County: Utena County
- Municipality: Molėtai district municipality
- Eldership: Dubingiai eldership
- Capital of: Dubingiai eldership
- First mentioned: 1334

Population (2017)
  - Total: 208
- Time zone: UTC+2 (EET)
  - Summer (DST): UTC+3 (EEST)

Dubingiai (Polish: Dubinki) is a town in Molėtai district in Lithuania. It is situated near Lake Asveja, the longest lake in the country. The town has 208 inhabitants as of 2017.

== History ==
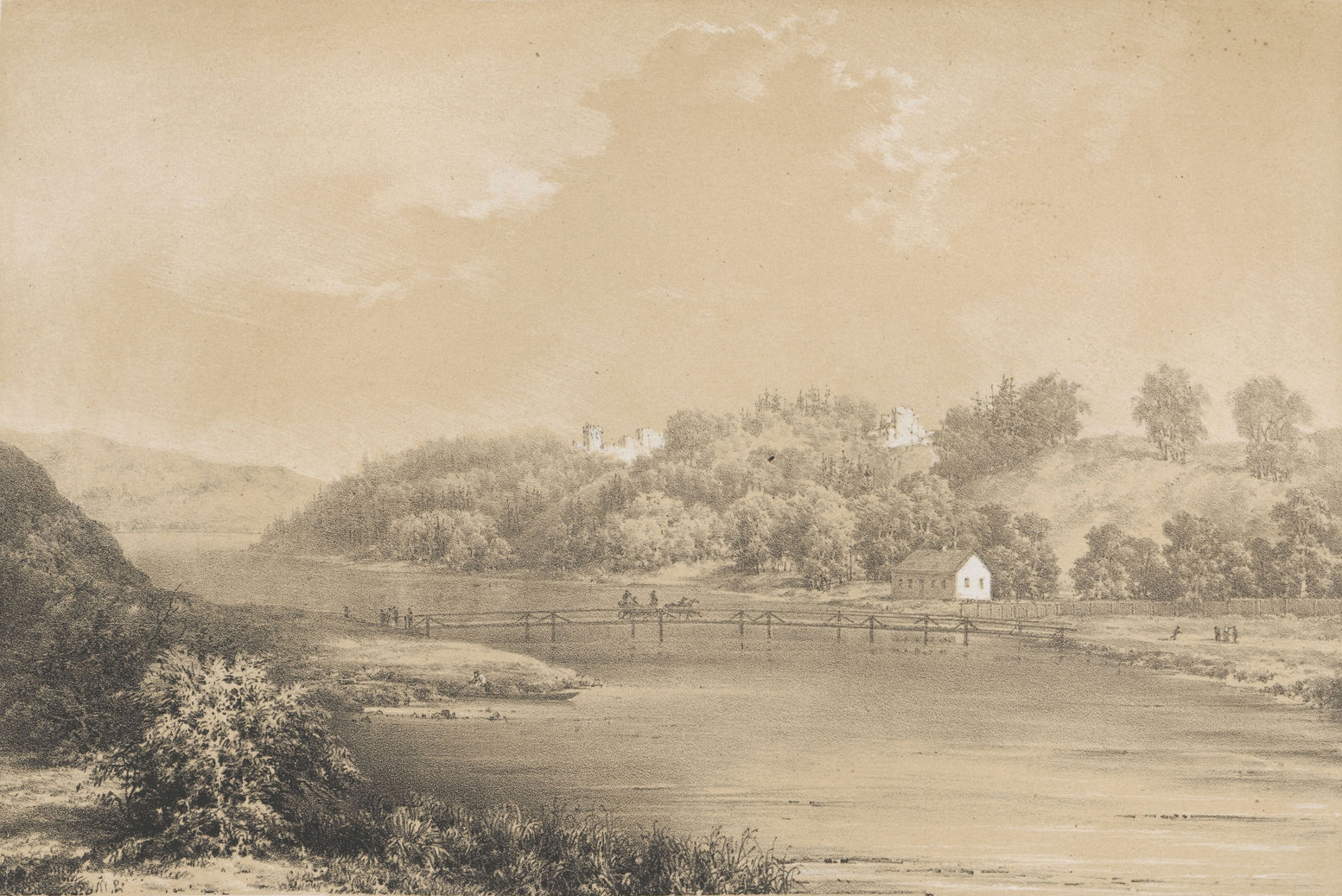
Ruins of Dubingiai Castle

The settlement was first mentioned in 1334, when the knights of the Teutonic Order razed terra Dubingam during one of their raids. Other raids took place in 1373 and 1375. During the reign of the Grand Duke of Lithuania Vytautas the Great the town became an important place in that part of Lithuania. In 1415 Vytautas ordered the building of a new masonry castle.

Later it was governed by the Radziwiłłs who built Dubingiai Castle from rock and town became one of the centres of the Reformation in Lithuania. Many famous members of Radziwiłł family were burned and are buried in the churchyard of Dubingiai castle. In the 17th century weave and paper manufactures were established in the town. In the 17th century - 18th century the town was slowly re-converted to Catholicism.

Within the Grand Duchy of Lithuania, Dubingiai belonged to Vilnius Voivodeship. It was annexed by the Russian Empire after the Third Partition of Poland in 1795 and became a part of Vilna Governorate.

The Polish Home Army's 5th Wilno Brigade massacred 27 Lithuanians in Dubingiai itself and 70–100 in neighbouring villages on 23 June 1944, during World War II. Previously, on June 20, the 258th Lithuanian Police Battalion's 3rd Company massacred 39 Polish civilians in Glitiškės.

== Gallery ==
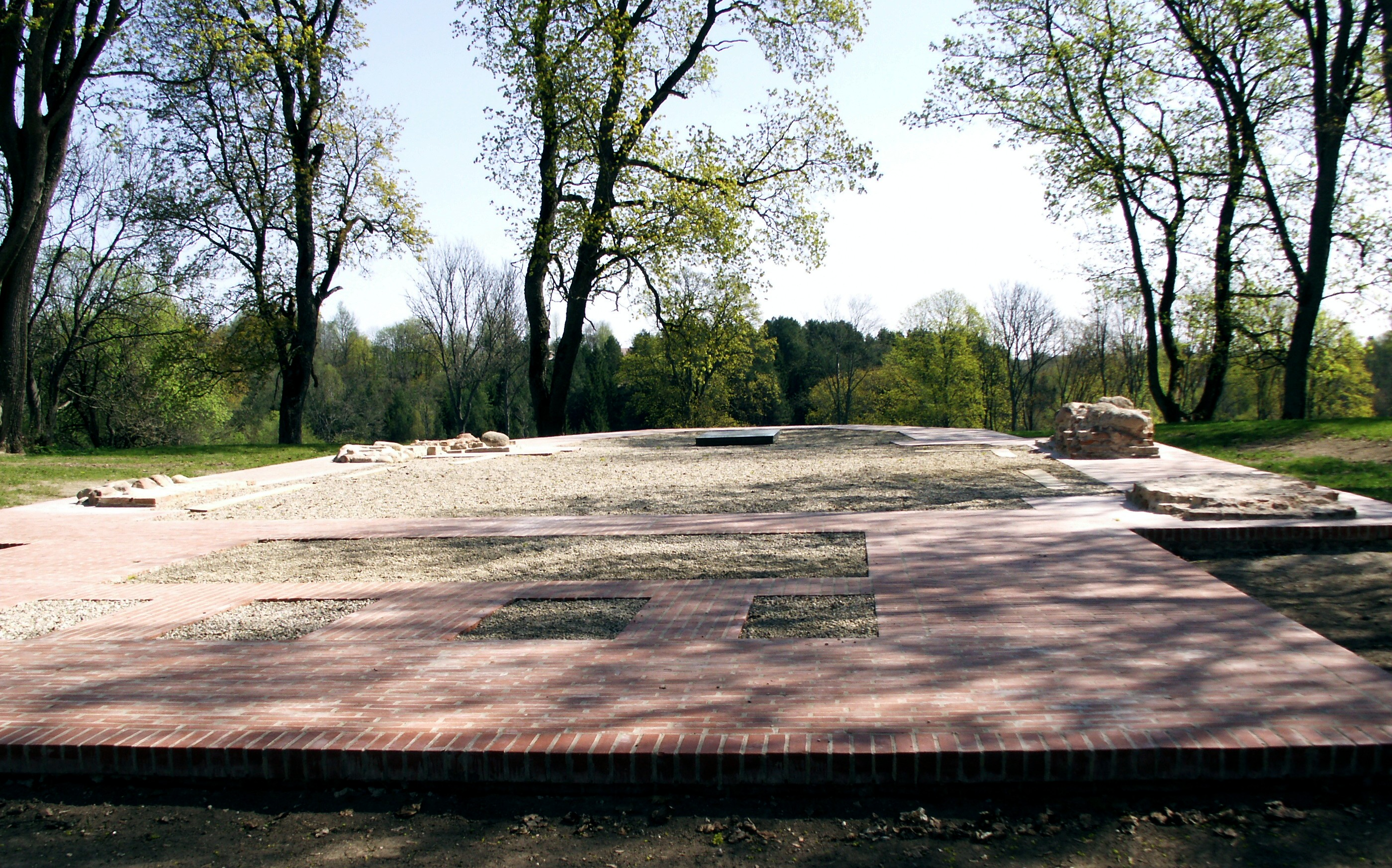
The remains of Evangelicals reformators church

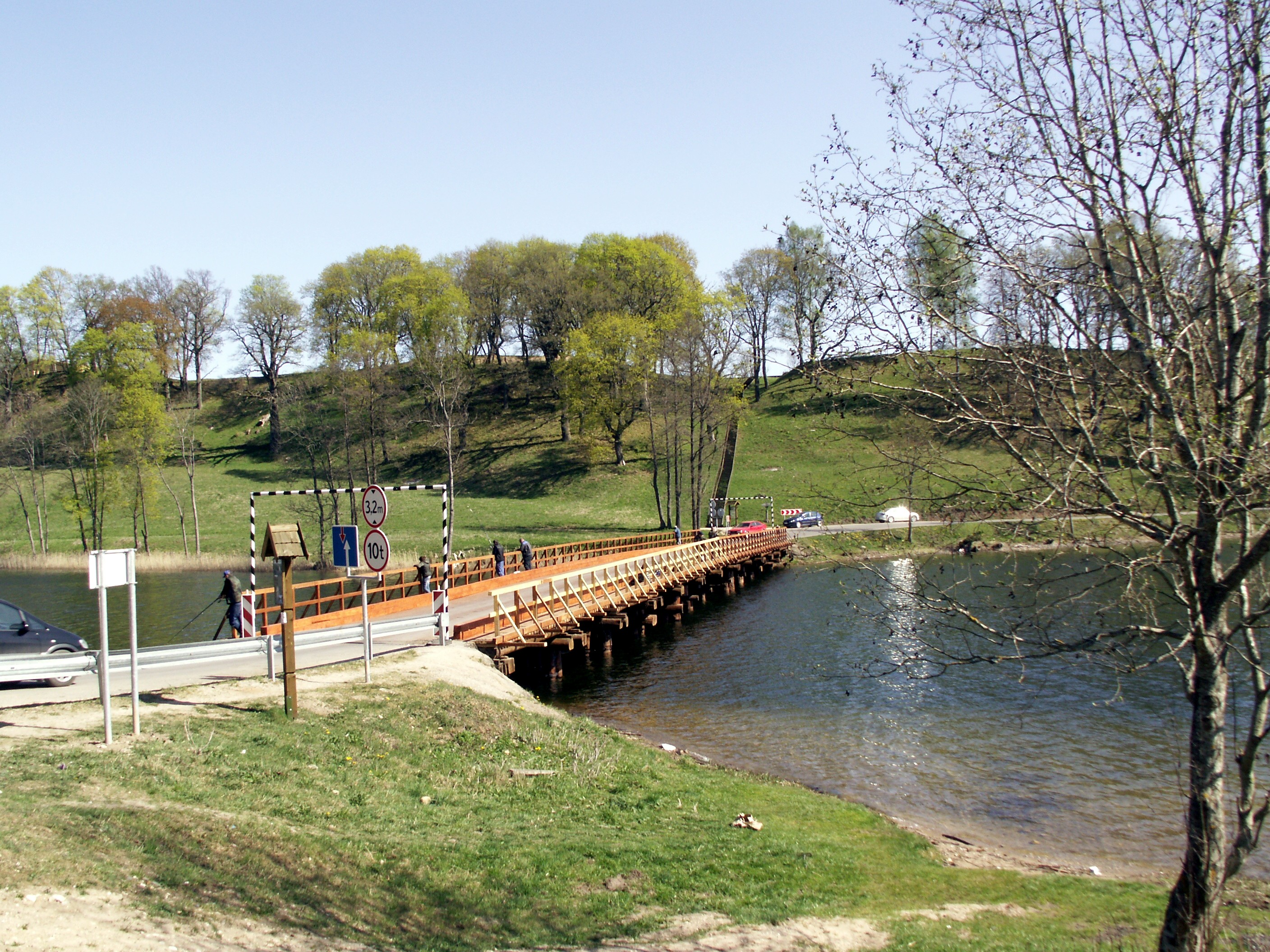
The bridge of Dubingiai

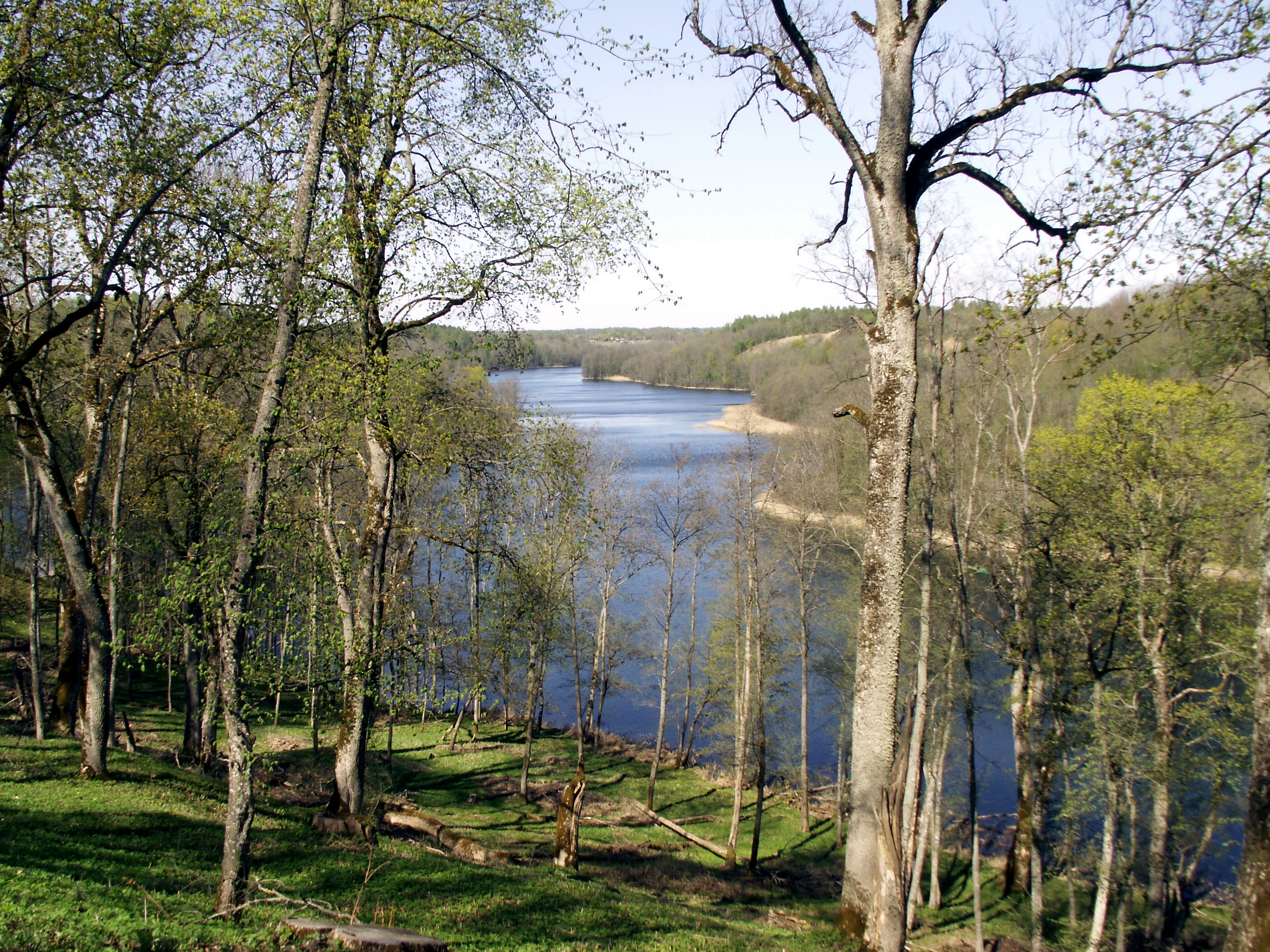
Asveja near Dubingiai

== Source and external links ==
- Rokicki, Paweł (2015). Glinciszki i Dubinki. Zbrodnie wojenne na Wileńszczyźnie w połowie 1944 roku i ich konsekwencje we współczesnych relacjach polsko-litewskich [Glinciszki and Dubinki. War crimes in the Vilnius Region in mid-1944 and their consequences in contemporary Polish-Lithuanian relations] (PDF). Monografie (in Polish). Warsaw: Institute of National Remembrance. ISBN 978-83-8229-224-4. Archived (PDF) from the original on 2022-10-15.
- (in Lithuanian) Website of Dubingiai
