= Žeimena =

Coordinates: 54°54′N 25°38′E

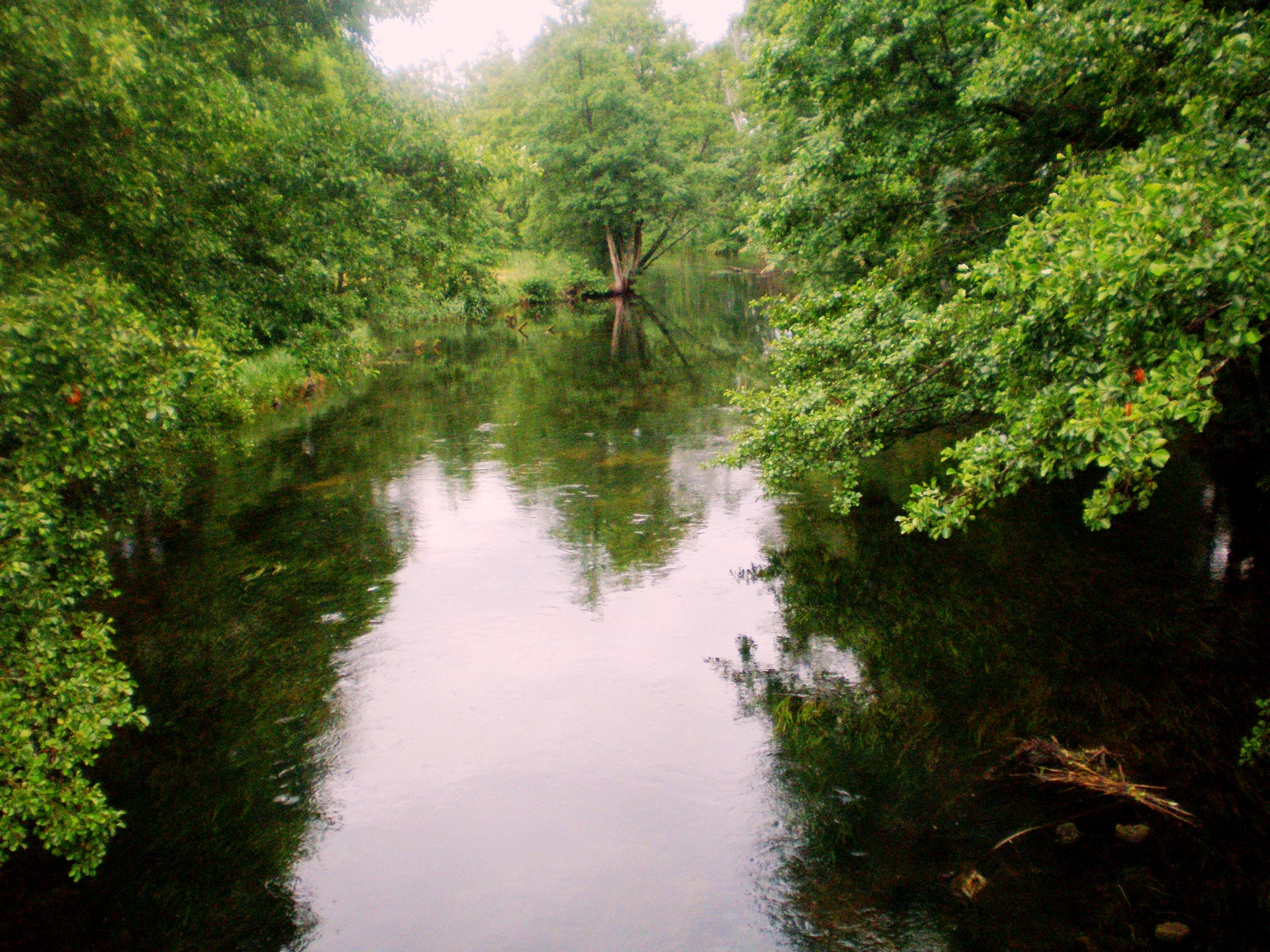
- Žeimena near Kaltanėnai

Location
- Country: Lithuania

Physical characteristics
- Source
  - location: Žeimenys lake
- Mouth
  - location: Neris River
- Length: 80 or 144 km (50 or 89 mi)
- Basin size: 2,793 km^{2} (1,078 sq mi)
- Discharge
  - average: 27.0 m^{3}/s (950 cu ft/s)

The Žeimena River is a river in Aukštaitija, eastern Lithuania, and right tributary of Neris River. Žeimena begins in Labanoras Forest and at Lake Žeimenys. Žeimena flows to the south passing Kaltanėnai town, Švenčionėliai city, and Pabradė city. Its confluence with Neris is located near the border of Švenčionys and Vilnius districts. The main tributaries of Žeimena are Lakaja, Saria, Mera, Kiauna, Luknelė and Jusinė.

Žeimena is one of the cleanest rivers in Lithuania. Also, it is one of the main places of salmon's spawning. The length of Žeimena is an object of discussion because it originates in a large lakeland of Aukštaitija National Park. The lakeland has many lakes that are interconnected by various rivers and streams, so it is difficult to say which lake is the source of which river. Traditionally, Lake Žeimenys is considered to be the source of Žeimena.

== See also ==
- Žeimenys
