= Aukštaitija National Park =

National park in Lithuania

- IUCN category II (national park)
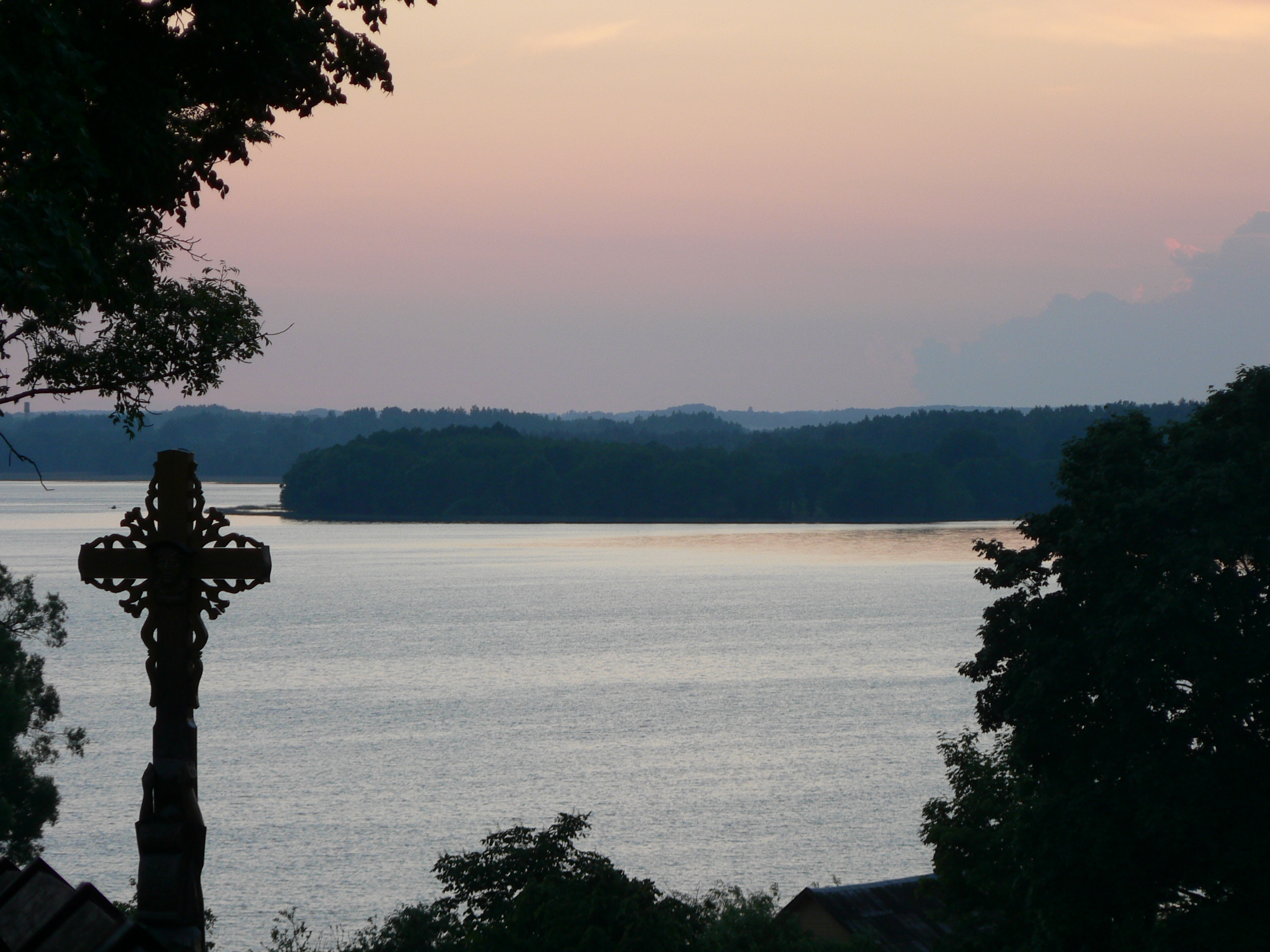
- Lūšiai lake in Palūšė

- Location within Lithuania
- Interactive map of Aukštaitija National Park
- Location: Lithuania
- Nearest city: Ignalina
- Coordinates: 55°20′38″N 26°03′25″E
- Area: 410.56 km^{2} (158.52 sq mi)
- Established: 1974

Aukštaitija National Park is a national park in north-eastern Lithuania, about 100 km north of Vilnius. Established in 1974, it is the oldest of the five national parks in Lithuania. It was initially named Lithuanian SSR National Park to emphasize that it was the first such park in the republic. In 1991 four other parks were established and were named after ethnographic regions of Lithuania. The park was renamed after Aukštaitija.

The park covers 410.56 km². Ignalina district municipality controls about 50% of the area. Utena and Švenčionys district municipalities control 25%. Strictly protected areas occupy 2.1% of the park's territory. One can enter this territory only accompanied by a park employee. More than 70 percent of its area is covered by woods. 80 percent of woods are pine stands, some reaching 200 years old.

Sixty-four species of plant, eight species of fungus and 48 species of bird found in the park are included in Lithuania's Red book. 59% of all plant species in Lithuania can be found in the park, which covers less than 1% of Lithuania.

== Waters ==
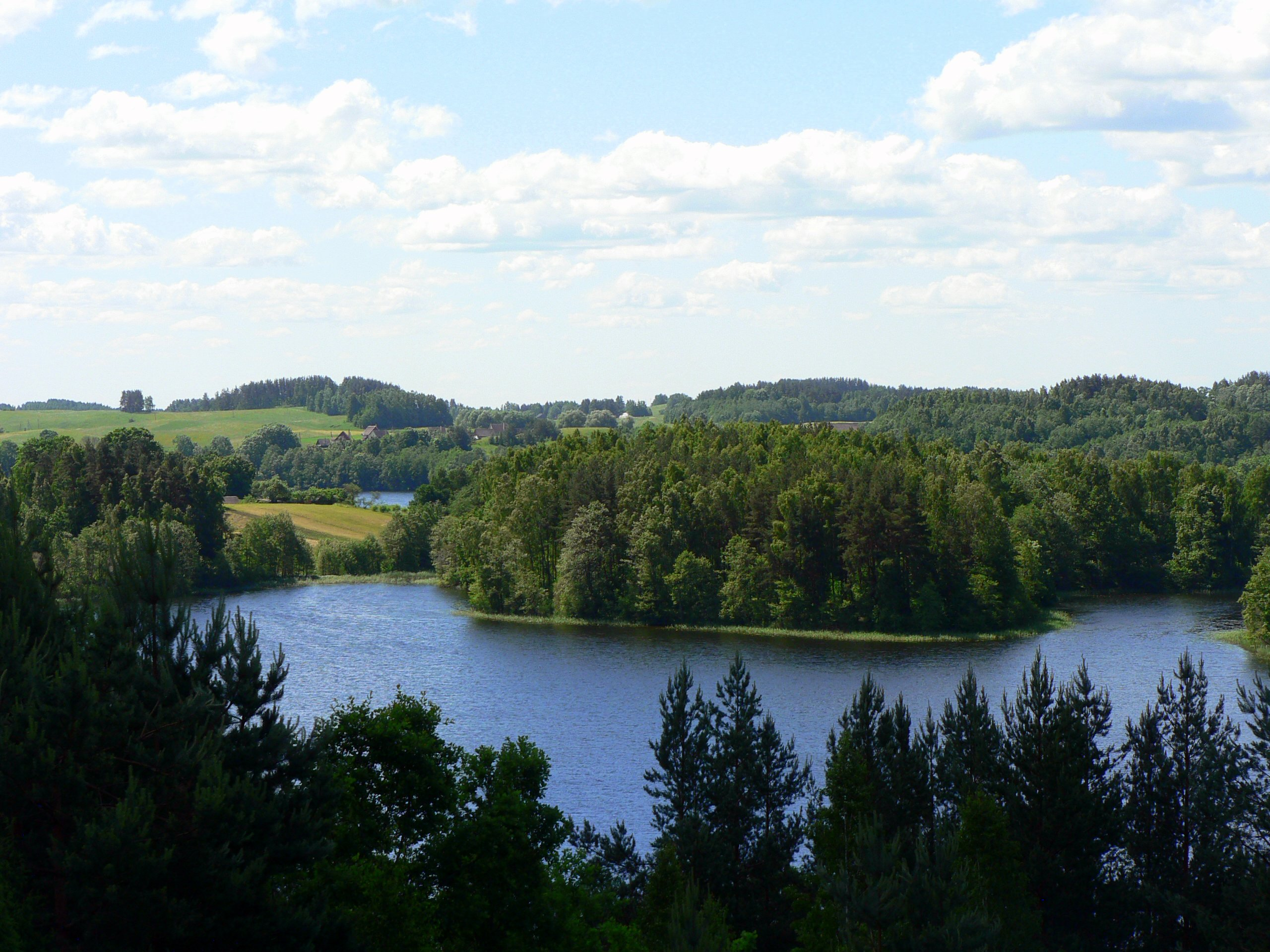
View from Ladakalnis hill

One hundred and twenty-six lakes are scattered among the woods and hills. Many are interconnected by rivulets and streams and are popular for kayaking. Since the park was established more than 40 years ago, the infrastructure for water tourism had been well developed. The lakes cover 59.30 km² (or 15.5%) of the park. The largest of the lakes is Lake Kretuonas (8.29 km²). Lake Tauragnas, the deepest in Lithuania (60.5 m), is also here. There are 14 lakes bigger than 1 km². Six lakes are between 0.5 and 1 km² and 35 lakes between 5 and 50 ha. The rest are smaller than 5 ha and some are gradually turning into swamps.

== See also ==
- Lake Gavys
- Lake Šakarvai
- Lake Kretuonas
- List of national parks in the Baltics
