= Tourism in Lithuania =

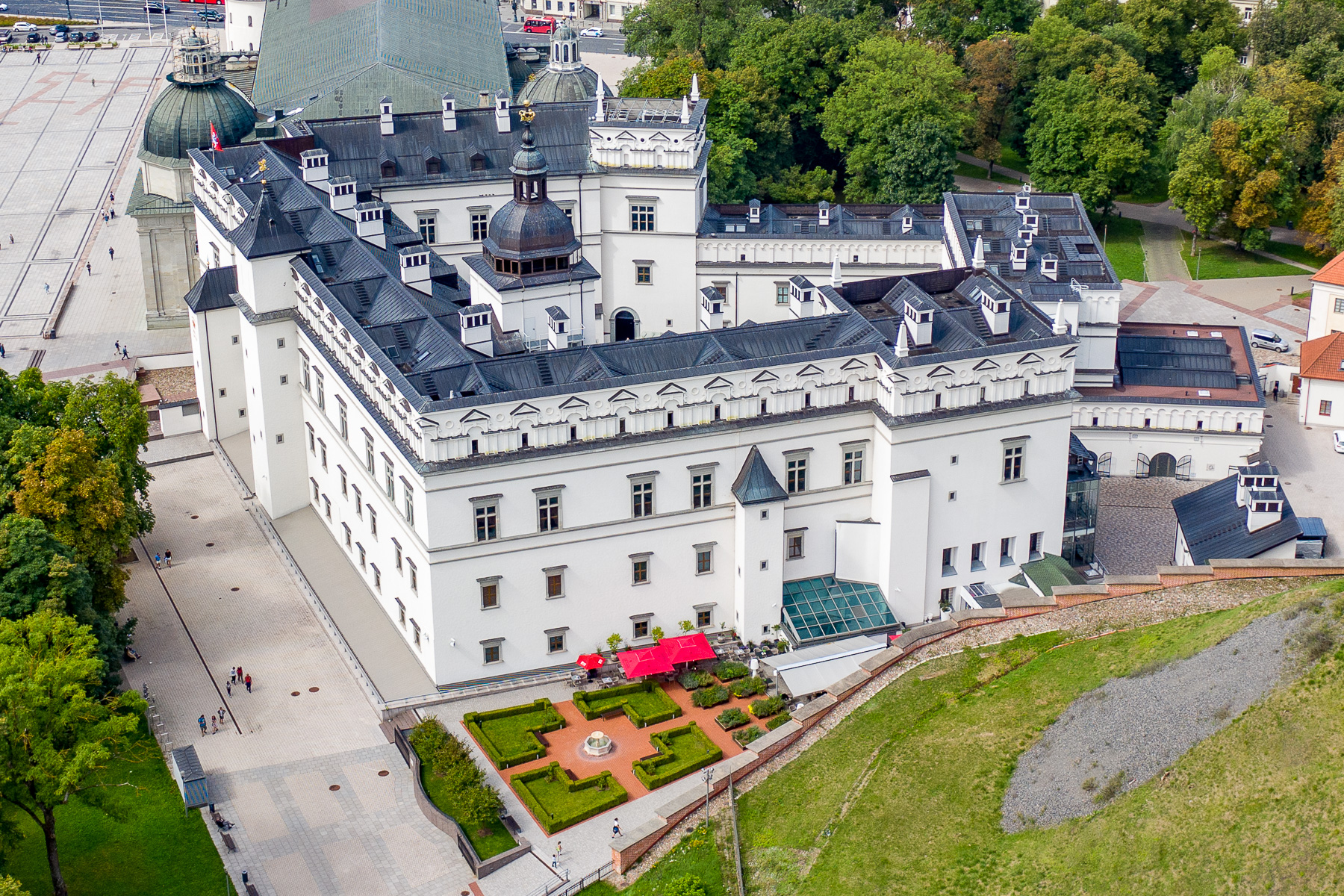
Restored Palace of the Grand Dukes of Lithuania in Vilnius

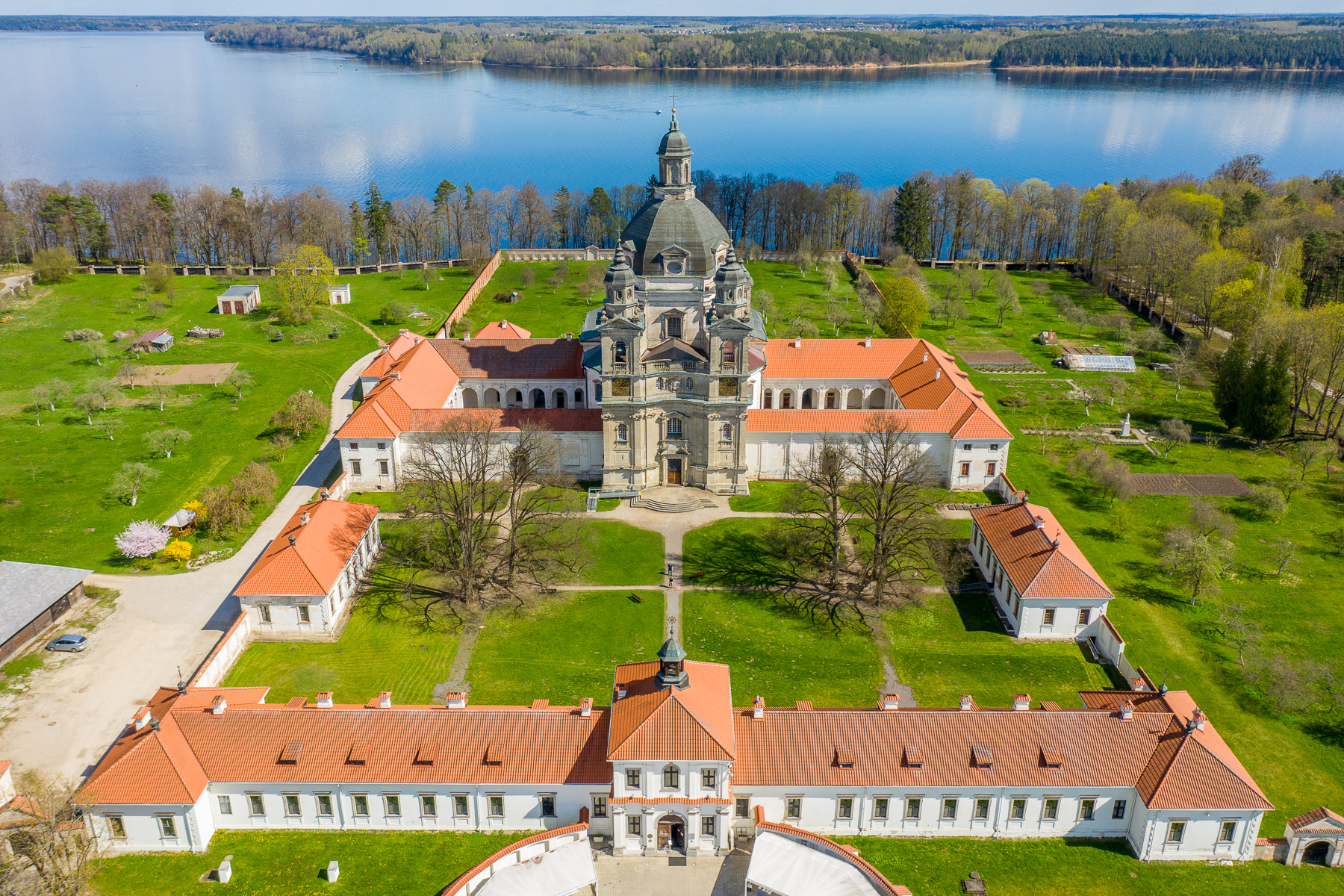
Pažaislis Monastery

Lithuania attracts many visitors from neighbouring countries and from all over the world. In 2018, there were 1.7 million foreign visitors to Lithuania for business, family and leisure. The historical legacy of the Grand Duchy of Lithuania, its rich architecture, pristine nature, wellness services, seaside and spa resorts, gastronomy and cultural content are the main attraction points of Lithuania. Domestic tourism is also highly popular: in 2018 it grew by 12%. Lithuanians also prefer to spend their vacations in Lithuania – 70 percent.

== Overview ==
Lithuania receives a constant increase in foreign visitors. In 2017, the accommodation establishments of Lithuania received 3.25 million tourists, which was 6.2 per cent more than in 2016. Lithuania attracts foreign visitors mostly from Germany, Poland, Russia, Latvia, Belarus, the United Kingdom, Estonia and Finland.

In 2017 hotels received 2.2 million tourists, or 7 per cent more than in 2016. The number of Lithuanian tourists grew by 12.8 per cent, and foreigners by 3.3 per cent. The hotel room occupancy rate stood at 54.3 per cent (in 2016, 51.7 per cent), and the hotel bed occupancy rate at 41.4 per cent (in 2016, 39.7 per cent).

Agrotourism has also gained extreme popularity in the country among the locals as well as foreigners. Ecotourism is actively promoted by the government and national parks. Lithuania has built a successful ecotourism industry, and has also been acknowledged as one of the world's most ethical destinations. Hot air ballooning is very popular in Lithuania, especially in Vilnius and Trakai. Theme routes through historical and nature sites are popular among domestic and international tourists. Nemunas Delta Regional Park, Žuvintas biosphere reserve and Ventė Cape are known for birdwatching. There are tourism information centres in all major cities and smaller towns, national parks and other places, attractive for domestic or international tourism.

Tourist arrivals of 2024 in %

If a tour has a guide who is "interpreting the cultural and natural heritage of an area", Lithuania requires the guide have a guiding license. This definition follows the European standard for tour guiding (CEN). Licensed Tourist Guides are the only professionals permitted to conduct tours in all sites and museums within a city. Licensed guides are required in those areas where the local authorities state that one of them is mandatory. There is a Guides Database to find a guide in your language as well.

== Statistics ==
=== Arrivals by country ===
The top 10 foreign countries by annual short-term visitors to Lithuania:

Record year

Country	2025	2024	2023	2022	2021	2020	2019	2018	2017	2016	2015	2014	2013	2012
Poland	200,416 ▲	174,266 ▲	173,497 ▲	117,555 ▲	54,674 ▲	50,670 ▼	199,651 ▲	179,245 ▲	161,421 ▲	154,124 ▲	132,368 ▲	122,630 ▼	132,346 ▲	127,033
Latvia	180,909 ▲	145,526 ▲	144,323 ▲	131,781 ▲	54,531 ▼	71,971 ▼	168,925 ▲	161,660 ▲	152,269 ▲	137,962 ▲	119,673 ▲	107,744 ▲	86,101 ▲	76,431
Germany	178,966 ▲	154,540 ▲	127,401 ▲	98,992 ▲	51,324 ▲	47,884 ▼	233,407 ▲	214,444 ▲	176,154 ▼	179,723 ▲	174,494 ▲	166,436 ▲	152,087 ▲	144,975
Belarus	110,084 ▲	109,396 ▼	141,894 ▲	98,328 ▲	35,439 ▼	42,946 ▼	181,074 ▲	165,569 ▼	177,099 ▲	174,070 ▲	165,410 ▼	189,888 ▲	163,707 ▲	117,037
United Kingdom	87,002 ▲	83,004 ▲	74,148 ▲	67,392 ▲	29,076 ▲	21,439 ▼	83,154 ▲	77,420 ▲	66,365 ▲	58,178 ▲	54,067 ▲	46,136 ▲	44,167 ▲	37,752
Estonia	68,125 ▲	55,974 ▼	61,317 ▲	52,585 ▲	22,944 ▼	42,305 ▼	68,302 ▲	65,131 ▲	63,193 ▲	59,579 ▲	53,732 ▲	48,681 ▲	43,183 ▲	39,712
United States	59,279 ▼	91,906 ▲	69,685 ▲	54,442 ▲	20,883 ▲	11,746 ▼	54,068 ▲	48,566 ▲	43,524 ▲	▲	▼	35,230 ▲	▲	
Ukraine	49,502 ▼	50,985 ▼	67,032 ▼	101,775 ▲	44,678 ▼	59,352 ▼	134,887 ▲	93,701 ▲	83,193 ▼	84,017 ▲	59,453 ▲	46,789 ▲	▲	
Finland	48,111 ▲	▼	35,503 ▲	27,363 ▲	▼	16,685 ▼	49,937 ▲	▲	▲	▲	▲	▼	34,166 ▼	34,745
Italy	42,447 ▲	37,902 ▲	▲	▲	14,105 ▲	▼	▲	43,285 ▲	39,890 ▼	39,944 ▼	40,627 ▲	33,790 ▲	28,912 ▼	30,137
France	▼	▲	▲	▲	14,491 ▲	▼	▲	▲	▲	▲	▲	▲	▼	
Netherlands	▼	66,081 ▲	32,606 ▲	▲	▲	▼	▲	▲	▲	▲	▲	▲	▲	
Norway	▼	▲	▲	▲	▲	▼	▲	▲	▼	39,793 ▼	42,397 ▲	▲	29,169 ▲	26,461
Russia	▲	▼	▼	38,081 ▲	▼	40,260 ▼	196,540 ▲	183,750 ▲	168,099 ▲	155,538 ▲	154,117 ▼	226,575 ▼	248,536 ▲	214,337
Total foreign	1,620,493	1,449,052	1,369,549	1,149,537	505,361	511,566	1,937,972	1,744,733	1,583,801	1,517,890	1,388,487	1,356,835	1,260,336	1,147,938
Y-to-Y change %	+11.83%	+5.81%	+19.14%	+127.47%	−1.21%	−73.60%	+11.08%	+10.16%	+4.34%	+9.32%	+2.33%	+7.66%	+9.79%	

== Notable places ==
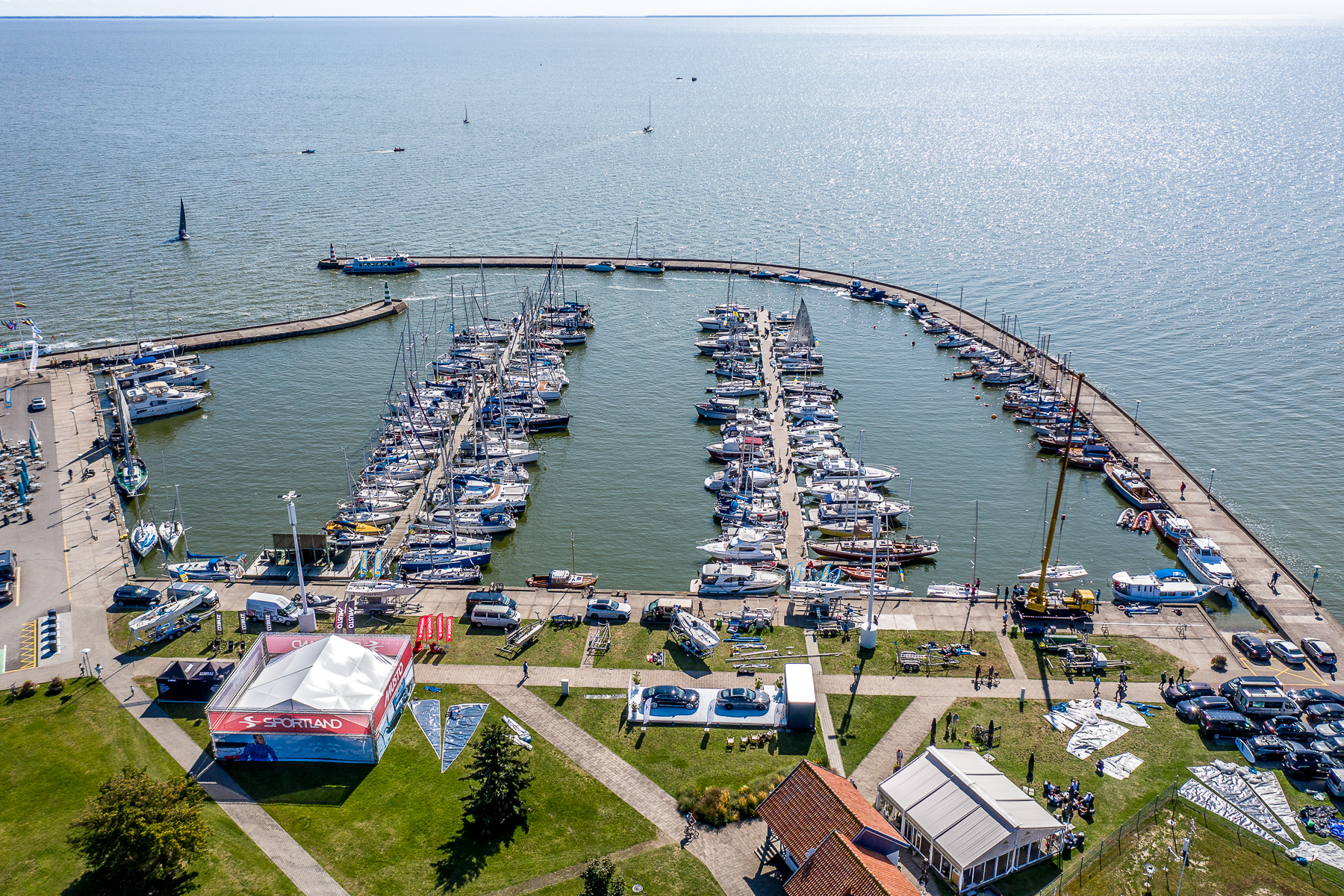
Nida is a resort settlement in Lithuania, on the Curonian Spit, and the westernmost point of Lithuania and the Baltic States.

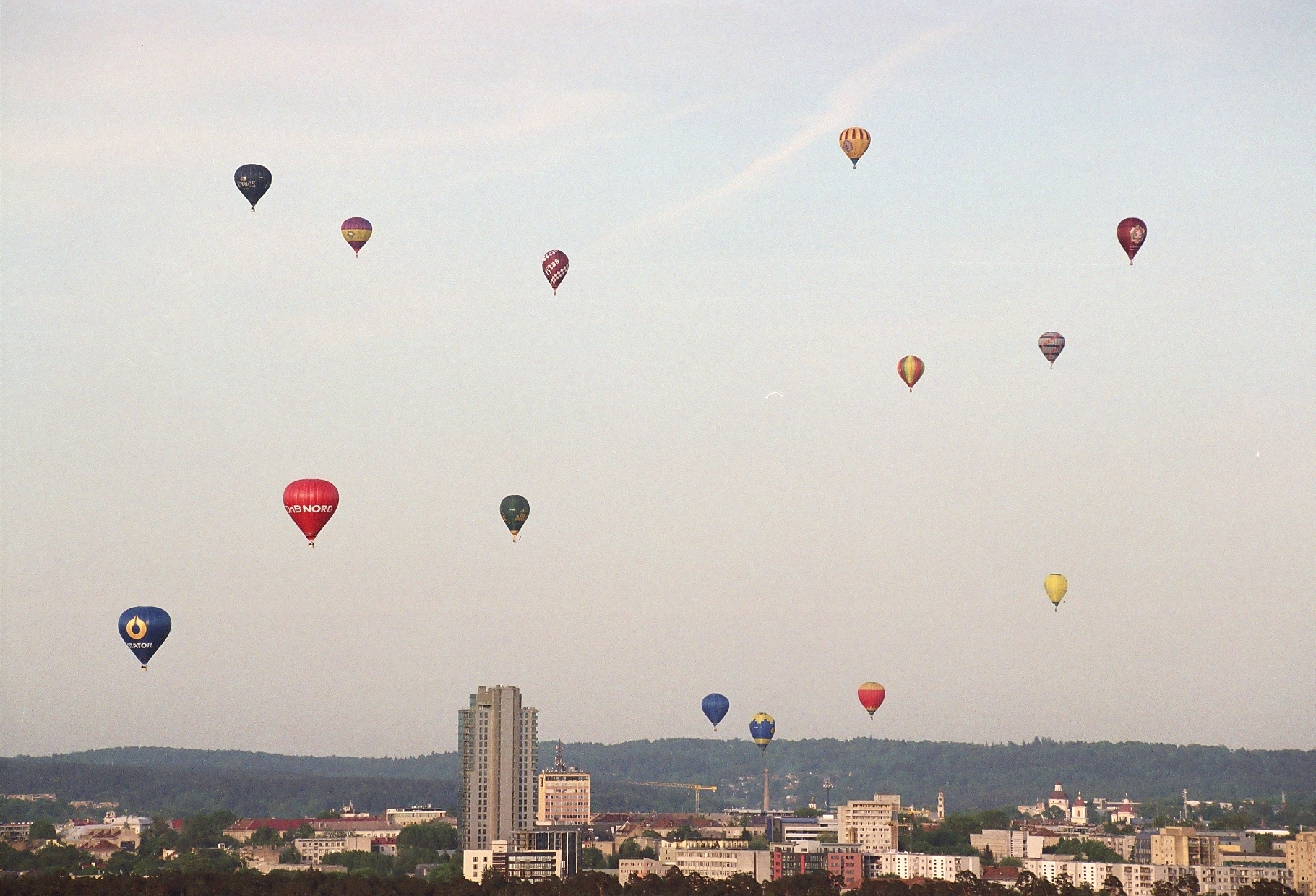
Hot air balloons over Vilnius

=== Cities ===
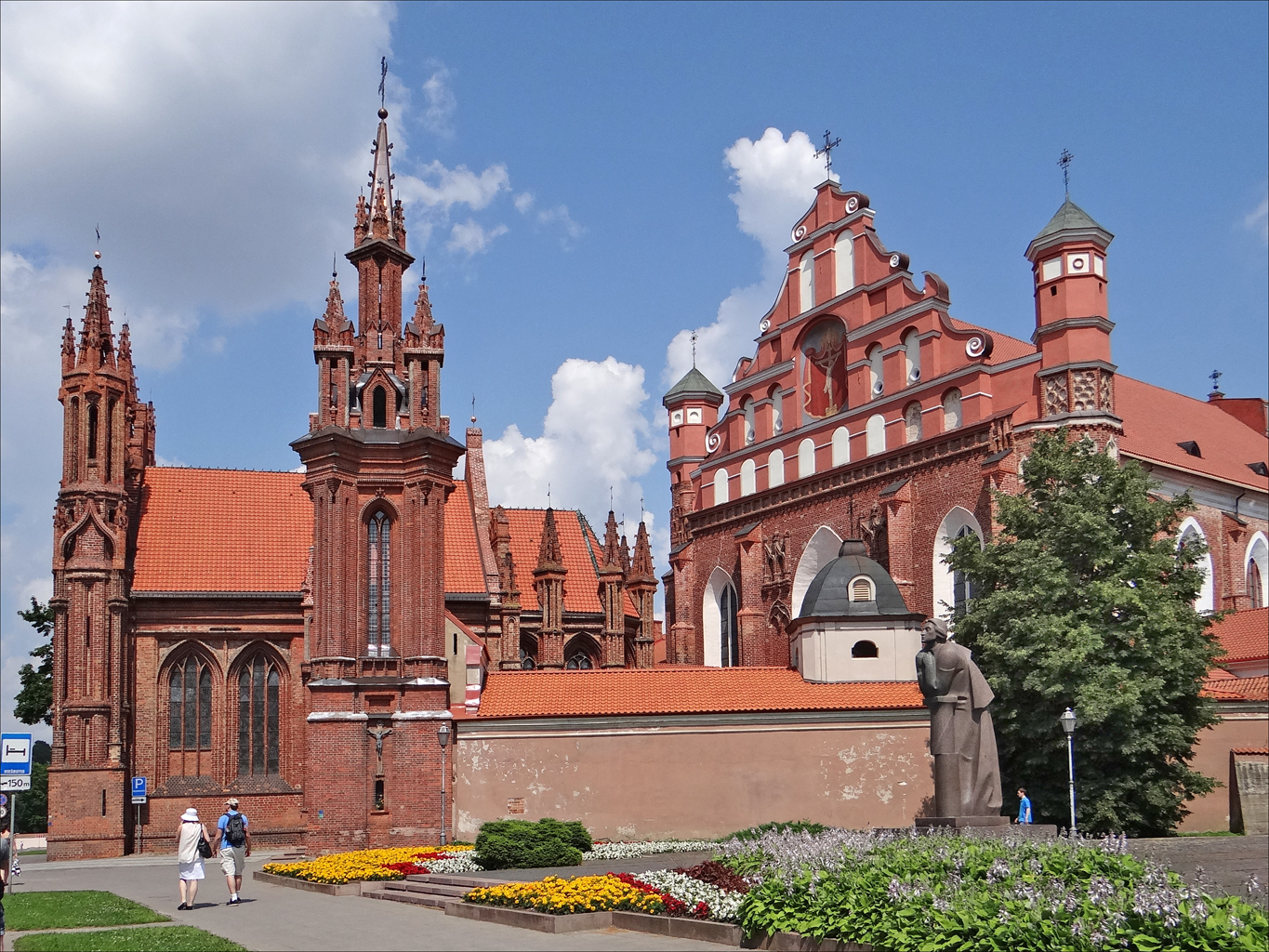
Church of St. Anne, Vilnius

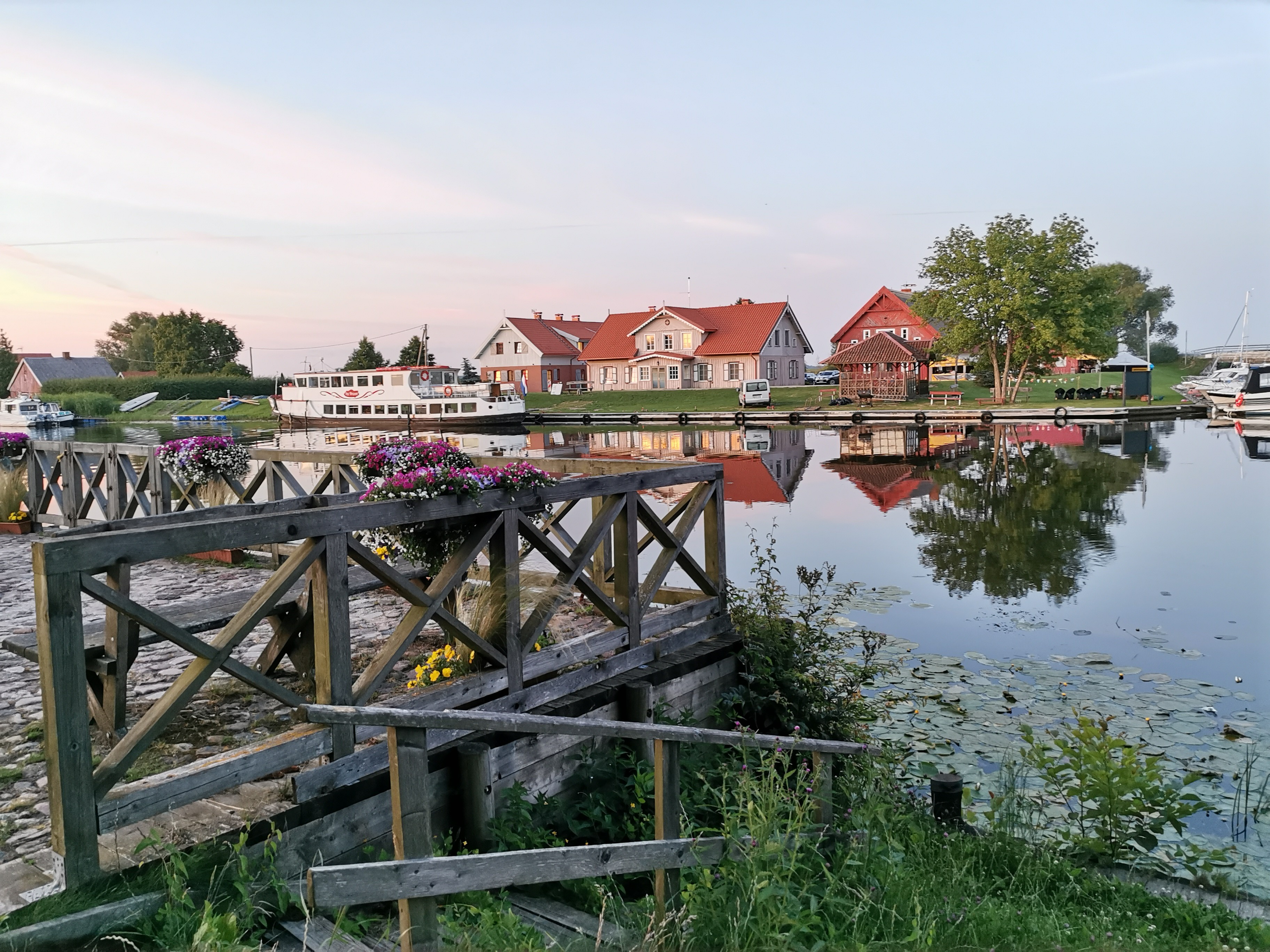
Minija is known for water tourism

- Vilnius – capital of Lithuania, in the past – capital of the Grand Duchy of Lithuania, first mentioned in Letters of Gediminas in 1323. Vilnius is full of cultural events – new operas, classical music, theatre and music festivals.
- Kaunas – temporary capital of Lithuania with prominent functionalism architecture, art and history museums, largest city Oak Park in Europe and the largest closed concert space in the Baltic states.
- Klaipėda – sea port with an attractive old town, Lithuanian Sea Museum. and Dolphinarium.
- Šiauliai – famous for nearby Hill of Crosses.
- Panevėžys – capital of Aukštaitija.
- Alytus – capital of Dzūkija in South Lithuania.
- Marijampolė – capital of Suvalkija.
- Telšiai – capital of Žemaitija.
- Šilutė – capital of Lithuania Minor.
- Mažeikiai – a modernist industrial city in Northern Lithuania.
- Jonava – an chemistry industrial city known for it Saint Jonas's Festival.
- Utena – an industrial city known for its breweries and surrounding lakes.
- Elektrėnai – an industrial resort city.
- Ukmergė – city in northwestern Lithuania known for its classicist, artistic old town.
- Pakruojis – city near Šiauliai known for its manor complex and seasonal festivals.
- Rokiškis – city known for its historical architecture and milk product industry.
- Kėdainiai – city in central Lithuania with prominent Renaissance architecture monuments
- Biržai – city in northern Lithuania with a Renaissance bastion castle, regional park and old traditional beer breweries.
- Kretinga – city near the Baltic Coast known for its iconic museum and historic architecture.
- Plungė – city known for its manor, artistic monuments and crab stick factory.
- Jurbarkas – city with a nearby regional park and castles.
- Tauragė – city known for its parks, museum expositions and signature castle.
- Trakai – historic city near capital Vilnius, known for its medieval architecture and surrounding nature.
- Varėna – city known for being called the "Mushroom Capital" of Lithuania due to its surrounding dense forests, which are rich in wild mushrooms. The annual Mushroom Festival (Grybų šventė) attracts visitors with mushroom-picking contests.

=== Towns and villages ===
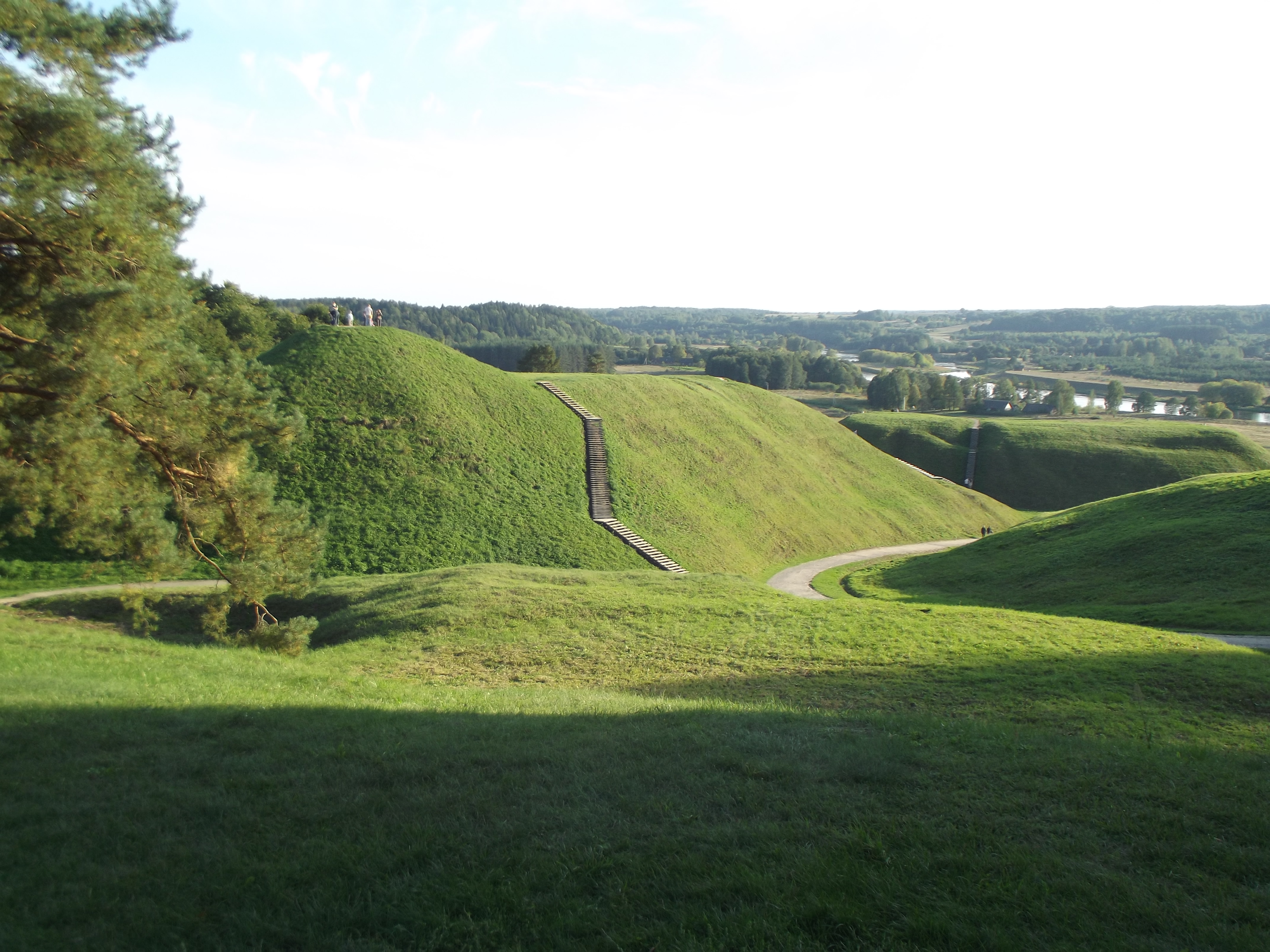
Kernavė

- Aukštadvaris – a hilly town known for its titular regional park.
- Balbieriškis – a town known for being situated near a large outcrop in the Nemunas Loops Regional Park.
- Dieveniškės – a town near the Belarus-Lithuania border known for the Dieveniškės Regional Park.
- Dubingiai – a historic town in Asveja Regional Park.
- Kavarskas – a town known for its dumplings and "magical" water supply.
- Kernavė – a medieval capital of Lithuania and an archaeological site, included into UNESCO World Heritage list.
- Prienai – a town located near the Nemunas Loops Regional Park.
- Salos – a tiny town located on an island in Dviragis lake, known for its centuries old manor.
- Stelmužė – a village near the Lithuanian-Latvian border known for one of the oldest oak trees in Europe and oldest wooden church building in Lithuania.
- Stakliškės – a village known for its production of midus and lemonade.
- Krekenava – a town known for its meat industry and regional park which houses European bisons.
- Lyduvėnai – a town known for the longest and tallest bridge in Lithuania.
- Rumšiškės – a town known for its open-air ethnographic museum. The buildings of this museum are exposed as farmsteads and all of them together represent the 5 main ethnographic regions of Lithuania.
- Medininkai – a historic town known for its signature castle.
- Molėtai – a resort town surrounded by lakes, known for hosting an astronomical observatory and a Museum of Ethnocosmology
- Minija – a small village known for water tourism.
- Perloja – a small village in southern Lithuania known for being a former independent micro republic.
- Vievis – a small city notable for its resort lake and museums.
- Vištytis – a small town located near Lake Vištytis known for its summer music festivals.
- Visaginas – a town in Northeastern Lithuania near Lake Drūkšiai known for being the youngest town of Lithuania and Ignalina Nuclear Power Plant.
- Zarasai – a town surrounded by lakes, mainly known for water tourism and music festivals.
- Žiežmariai – a town located next to A1 highway, known for its minor historic architecture and meat industry.

== Specific destinations ==
=== Protected areas and cultural heritage objects ===
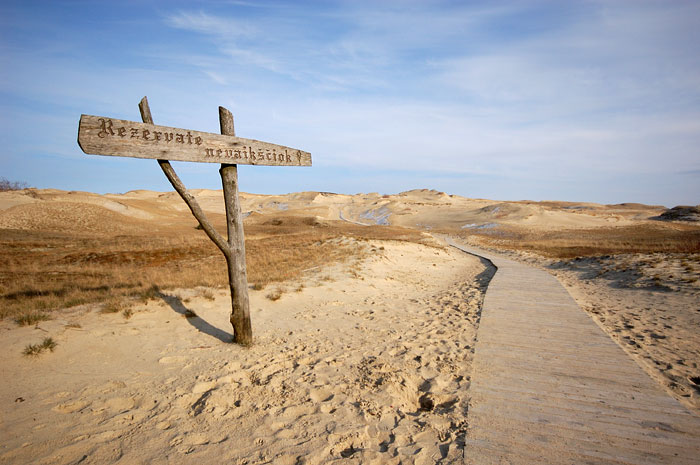
Sand dunes in Kuršių Nerija National Park

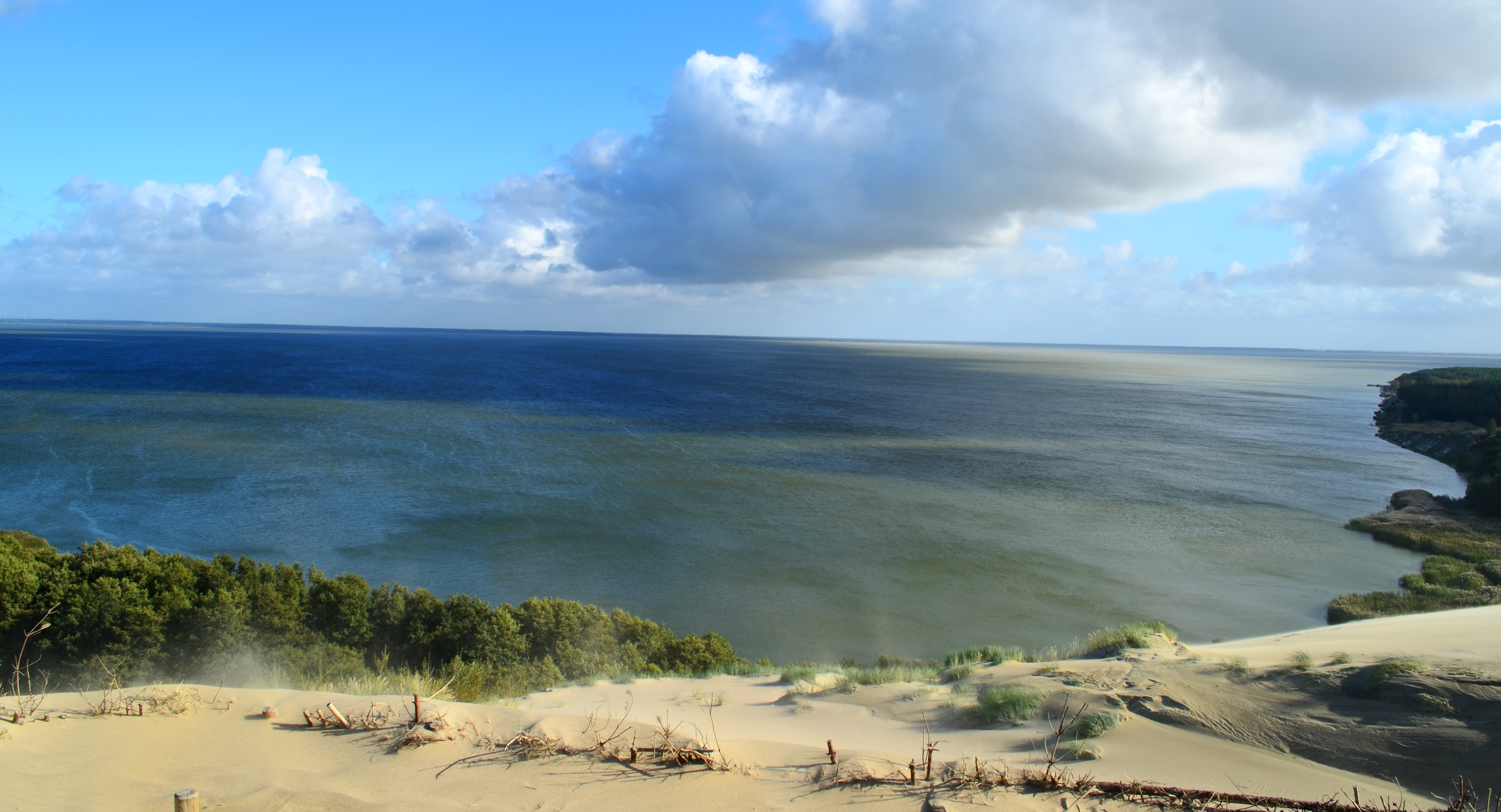
Curonian Lagoon, view from the Agila dune in Neringa

Lithuania has 1160 protected cultural and natural areas. Among them are 30 regional parks and 5 national parks and 6 strict reserves.

- Aukštaitija National Park
- Žemaitija National Park
- Kuršių Nerija National Park
- Dzūkija National Park
- Trakai Historical National Park

There are also 35 814 cultural heritage objects throughout the country protected by the Department of Cultural Heritage.

=== UNESCO World Heritage Sites ===
- Kernavė – ancient capital of Lithuania, a complex of historical hillforts and an archaeological site, called "Troy of Lithuania"
- Curonian Spit – the resort and nature reserve.
- Vilnius Old Town – the old capital of the Grand Duchy of Lithuania, largest baroque city in Northern Europe, is among the largest historical centres in Europe.
- Modernist architecture of Kaunas – described by UNESCO as Architecture of Optimism 1919–1939
- Struve Geodetic Arc – chain of survey triangulation points located in Panemunėlis, Nemenčinė and Nemėžis

=== Cultural routes ===
In 2019 Cultural Route of Lithuanian composer Mikalojus Konstantinas Čiurlionis was opened which leads through the places in Varėna, Druskininkai, Kaunas, Vilnius, Plungė, Rietavas, Palanga where composer has lived.

Cognitive or sightseeing routes (Pažintinis takas) are highly popular among domestic tourists. Usually they lead through unique places in nature, where the visitor can enjoy the nature and local history while walking some predefined path.

== Pilgrimage sites ==
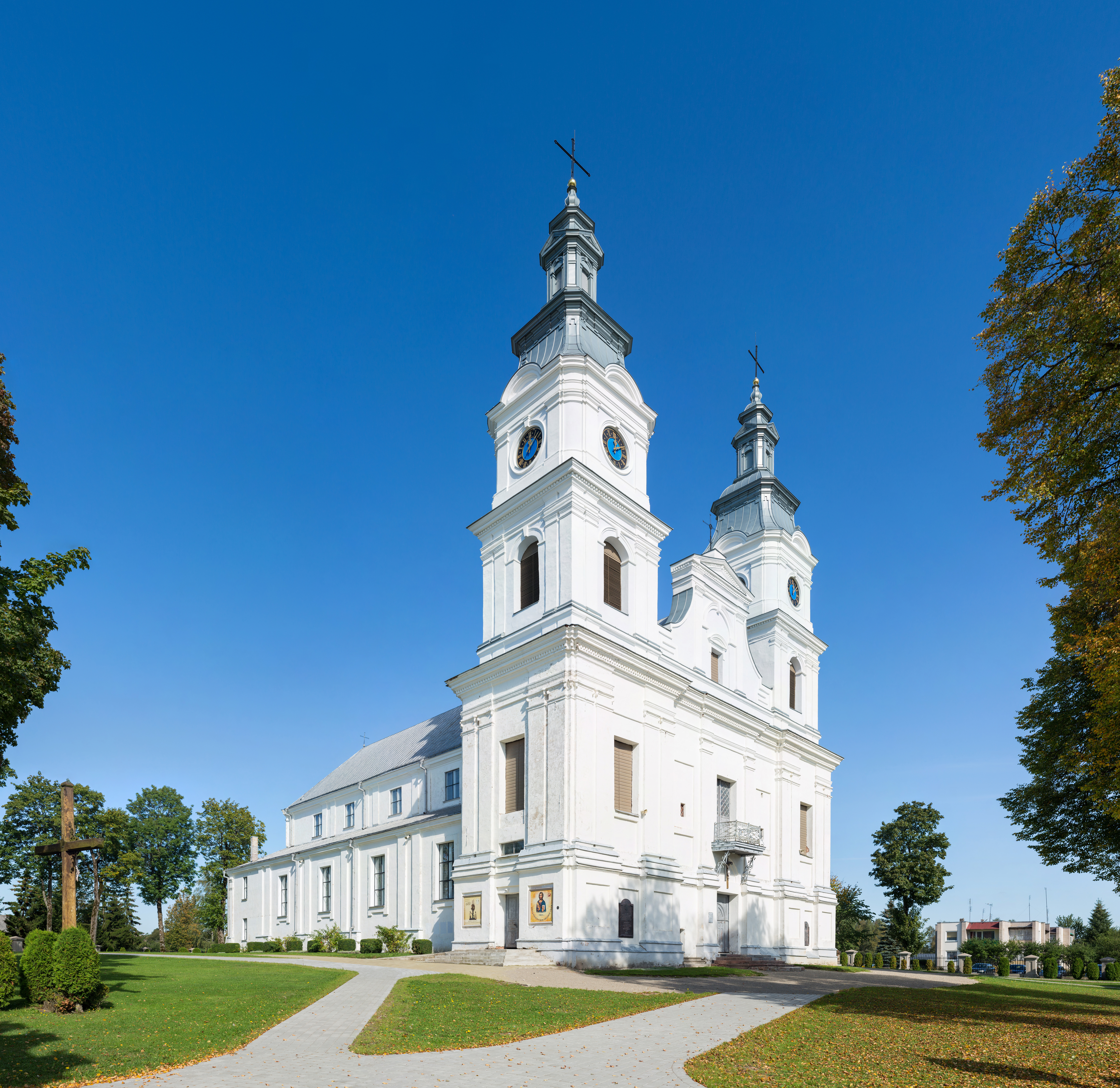
Žemaičių Kalvarija Church.

Lithuania has many holy sites, especially in Samogitia.

Major pilgrimage sites:

- Gate of Dawn (Vilnius)
- Hill of Crosses (Samogitia)
- Žemaičių Kalvarija (Samogitia)
- Šiluva (Samogitia).

== Resorts ==
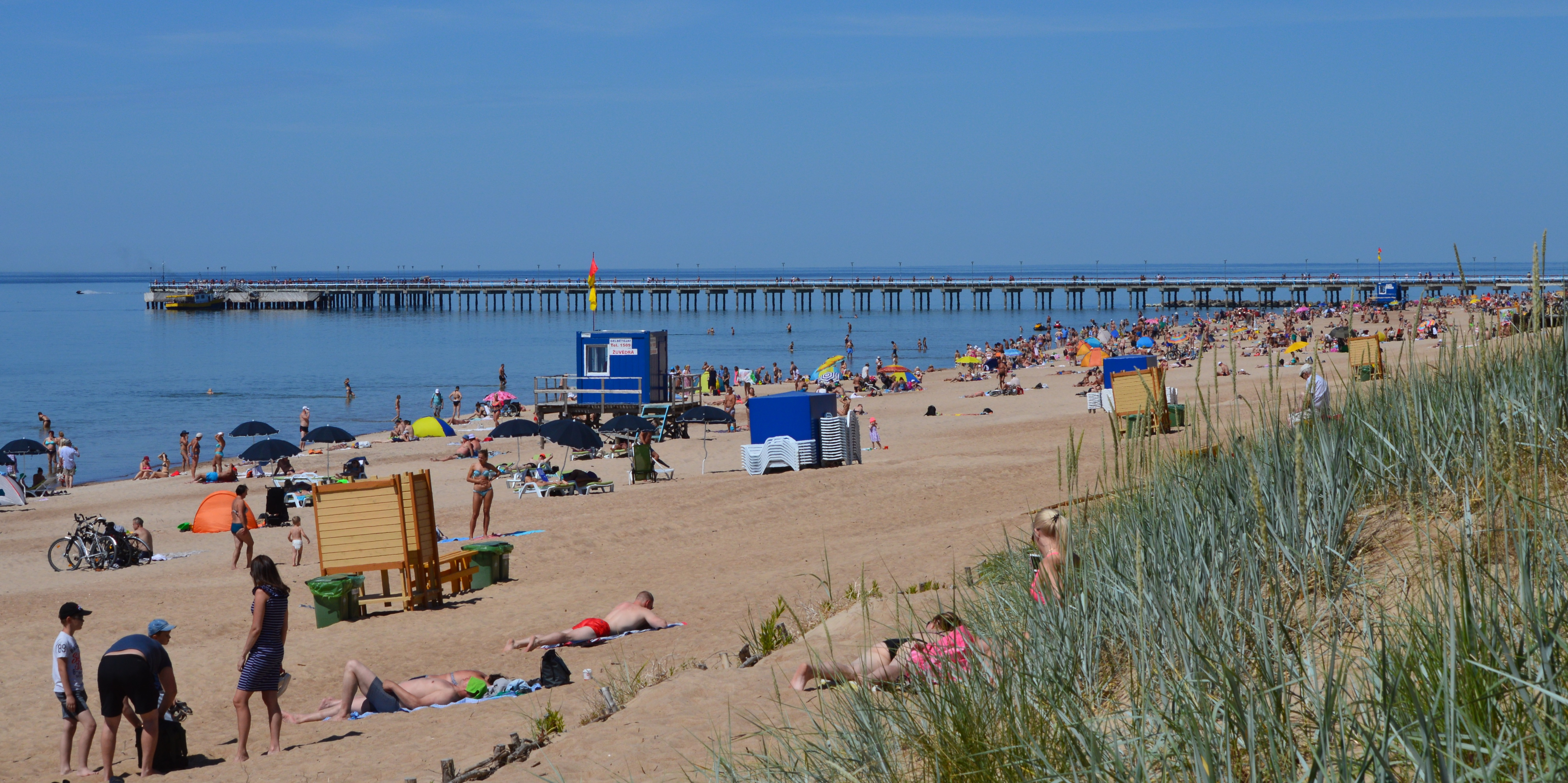
Golden sand beach in Palanga

Lithuania has 4 official resorts and 5 resort territories.

=== Resorts ===
- Birštonas – a balneological resort and a spa town, surrounded by pine forests.
- Druskininkai – a developed spa town with the largest water park in the Eastern Europe, the Snow Arena – one of the biggest indoor skiing slopes in Europe. The Water Park and the Snow Arena connected with the cable car.
- Neringa - a world heritage site with unique nature, including resort settlements of Nida and Juodkrantė
- Palanga – the summer capital of Lithuania with sandy beaches
  - Šventoji - a resort town on the coast of the Baltic sea

=== Resort territories ===
- Anykščiai – ski resort and spa Town in middle Lithuania
- Ignalina and the villages of Palūšė and Strigailiškis
- Kulautuva-Kačerginė-Zapyškis – traditional spa treatment area for forest recreation on bank of Nemunas River in Kaunas district
- Trakai – natural, anthropogenic lake-rich city with a historical world heritage site, near to Vilnius
- Zarasai – a city in nordeastern Lithuania, surrounded by many lakes and rivers

=== Former places ===
- Likėnai – a resort with mineral springs.

== Military heritage ==
There are military sites left throughout the country, reflecting Lithuania's history of the warfare and the Cold War.

Major militarism heritage sites in Lithuania :

- Kaunas Fortress, a massive system of forts built around Kaunas during the Russian Empire rule in the 19th century;
- Plokštinė missile base, a former Soviet nuclear launch site in Samogitia.

== Bicycle tourism ==
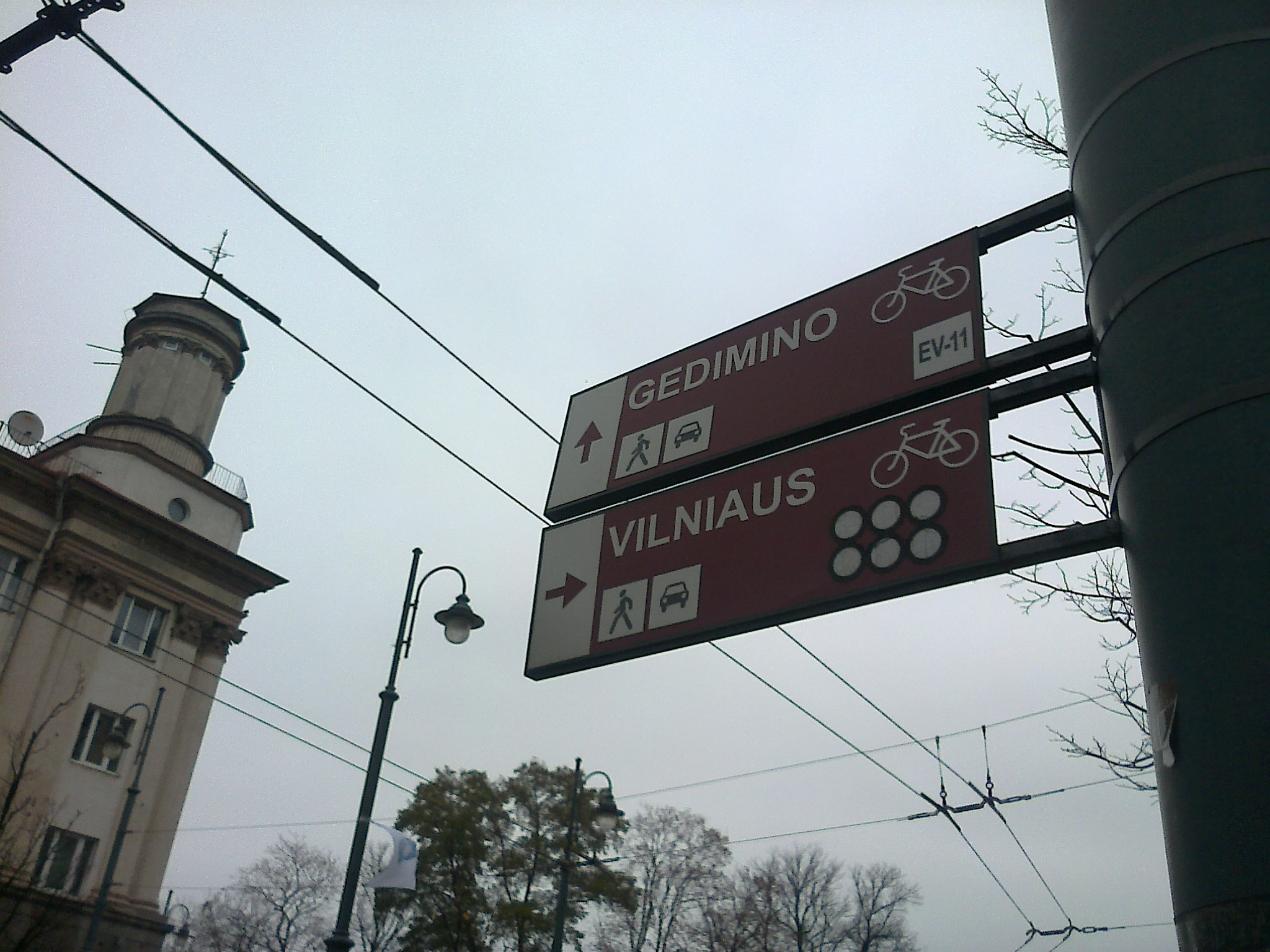
Signage for EuroVelo 11, Vilnius, Lithuania.

Bicycle tourism is growing, especially in Lithuanian Seaside Cycle Route. EuroVelo routes EV10, EV11, EV13 go through Lithuania. Total length of bicycle tracks amounts to 3769 km (of which 1988 km is asphalt pavement). Most known bicycle routes are: Nemunas River Cycle Route, Suvalkija Cycle Circuit, Lithuanian Seaside Cycle Route. Most of the Tourism information centres and national parks have their local thematic bicycle route plans.

== Festivals ==
- Kaziuko mugė
- Lithuanian Song and Dance Festival
- Užgavėnės
- Vilnius Jazz Festival
- Kaunas Jazz Festival
- Vilnius International Film Festival
- Kaunas International Film Festival
- Klaipėda Sea Festival

== Museums ==
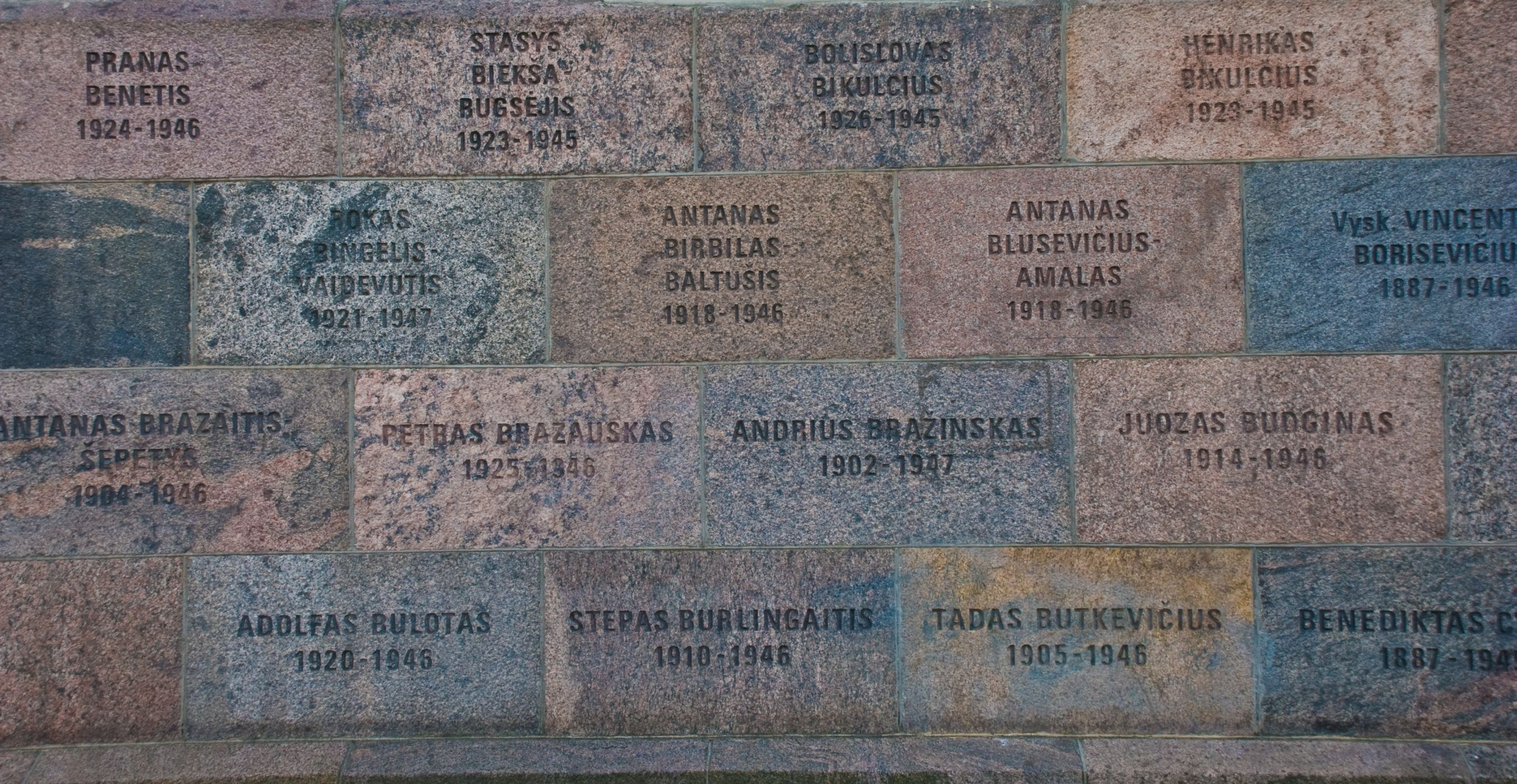
The names of the executed Lithuanian partisans are carved on the basement wall of the Museum of Occupations and Freedom Fights

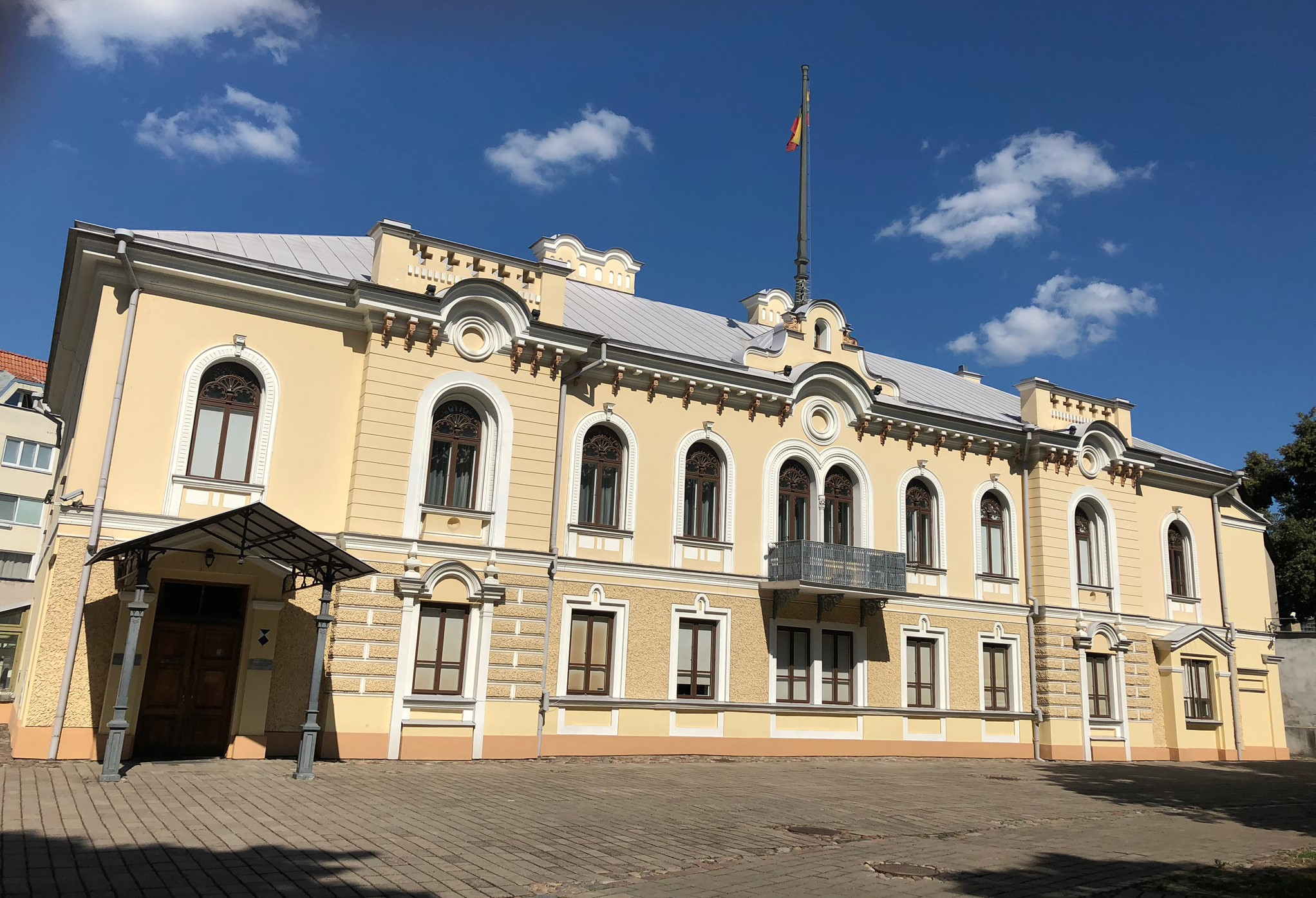
The Historical Presidential Palace in Kaunas

Museums include:

- Automuseum Vilnius, Vilnius –
- Lithuanian Museum of Ethnocosmology
- Palanga Amber Museum
- Vilnius Amber Museum-Gallery
- Palace of the Grand Dukes of Lithuania
- Church Heritage Museum
- Lithuanian Museum of Ancient Beekeeping
- National Gallery of Art
- M. K. Čiurlionis National Art Museum
- Vytautas the Great War Museum
- National Museum of Lithuania
- Vilnius Castle Complex
- Vilnius Picture Gallery
- Vilnius Toys' Museum
- Museum of Occupations and Freedom Fights
- Lithuanian Aviation Museum
- MO Museum – Museum of modern and contemporary Lithuanian art
- Tartle – Museum of Lithuanian art heritage and artefacts.
- Klaipėda Clock and Watch Museum
- Šiauliai Photography Museum
- Akmenė Akemenė fossil museum
- Ornithological station and a museum in Ventė Cape

== Gallery ==
Tourism in Lithuania gallery
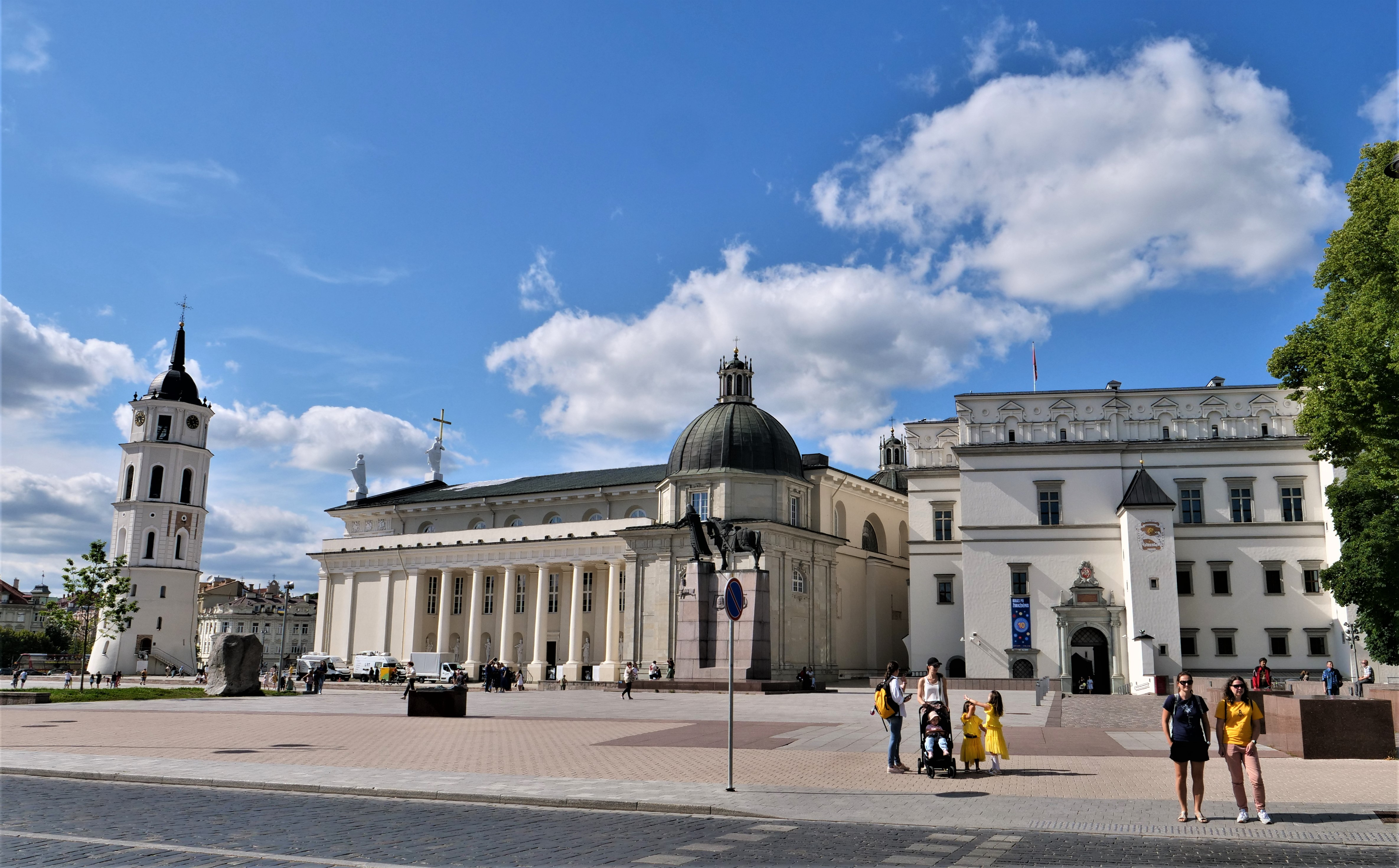
Vilnius Cathedral

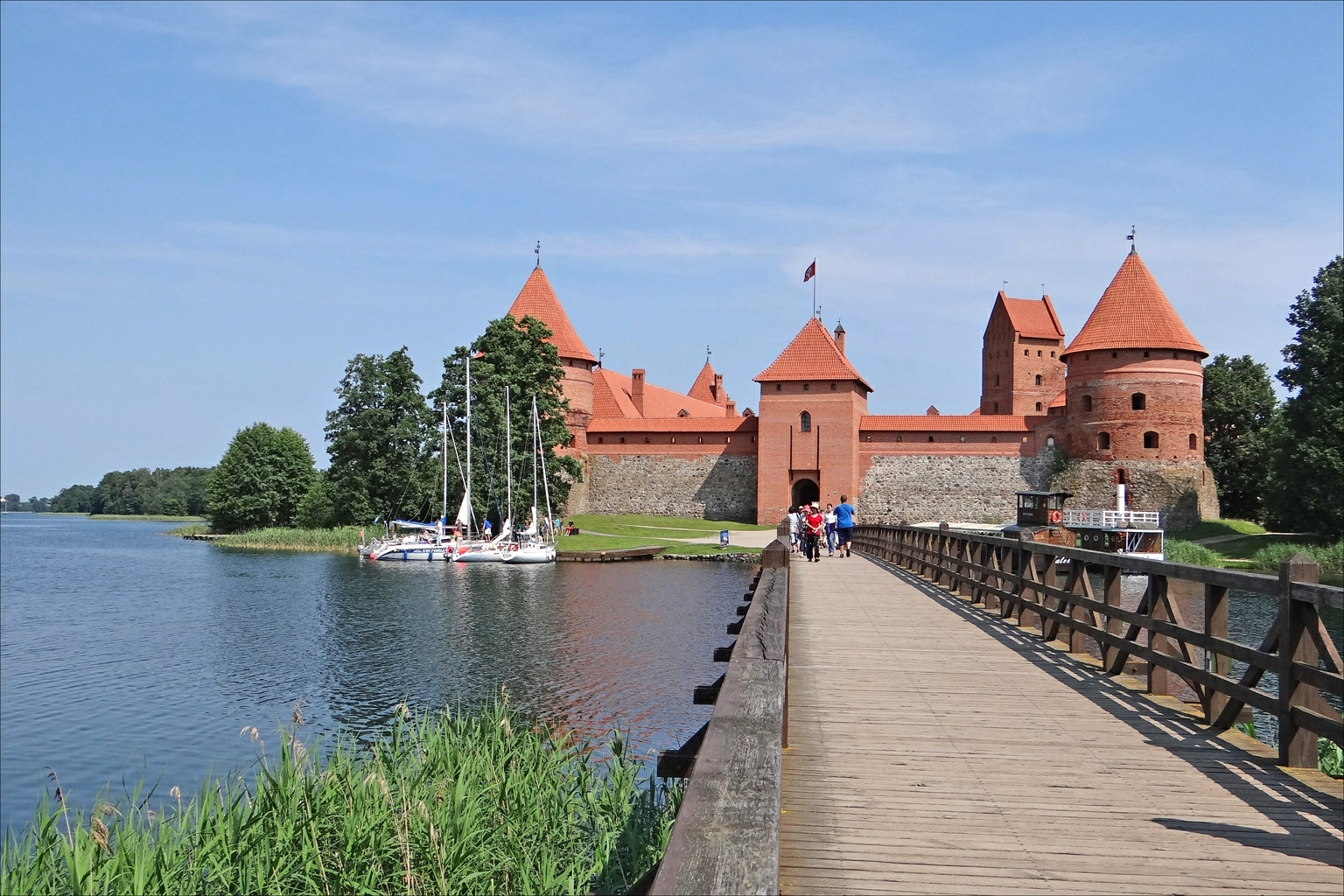
Trakai Island Castle

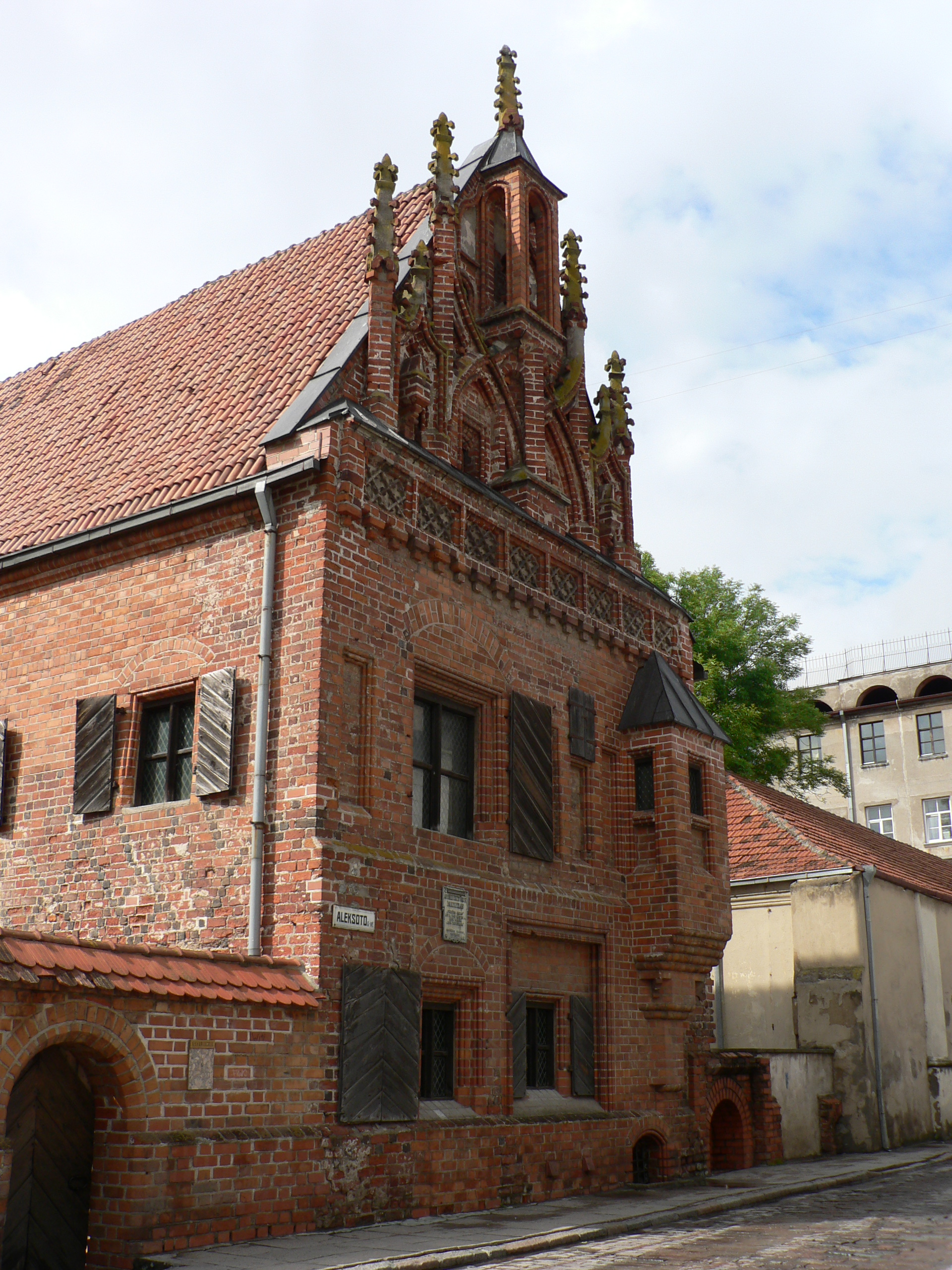
House of Perkūnas, Kaunas

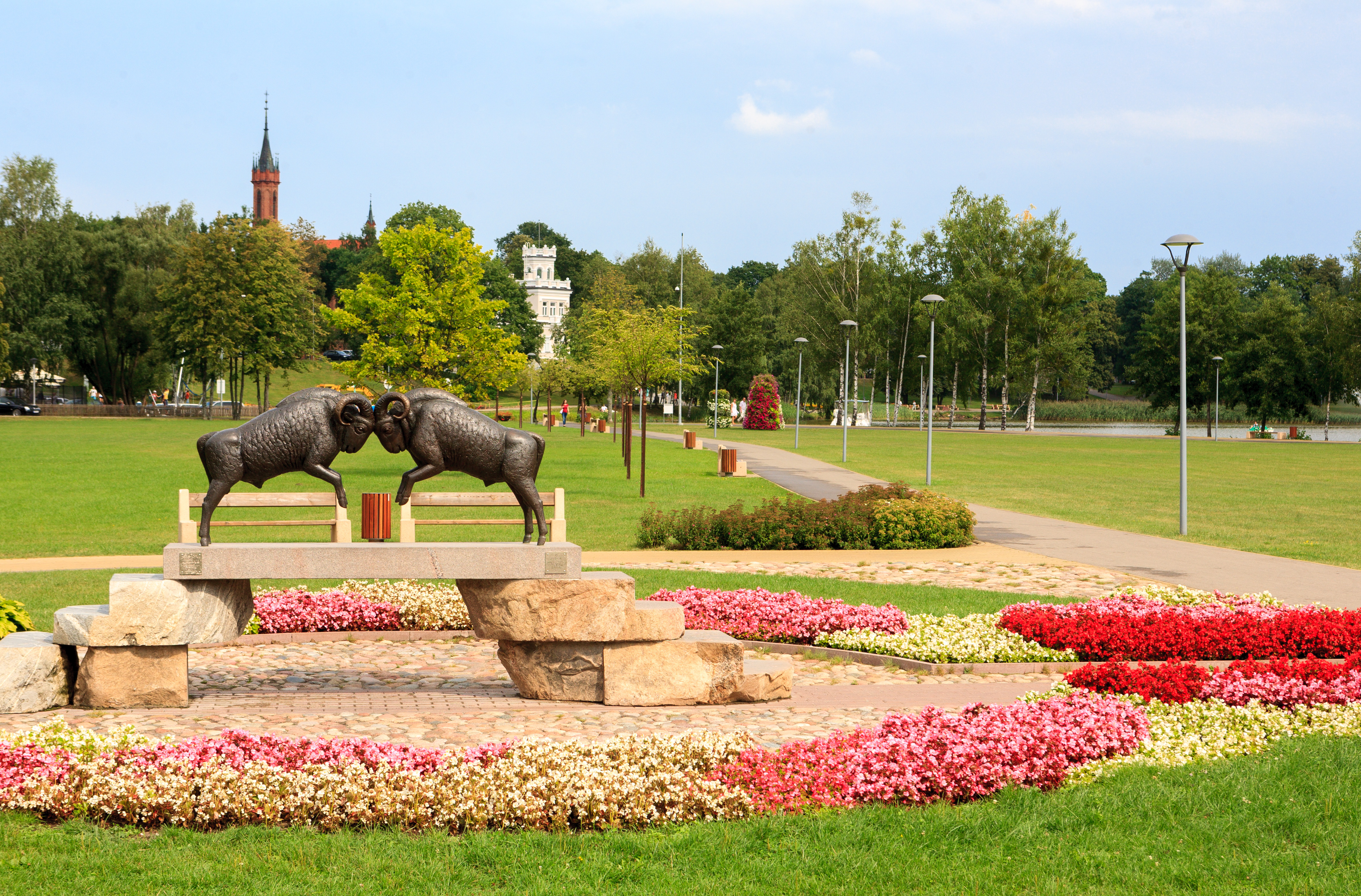
Spa town of Druskininkai

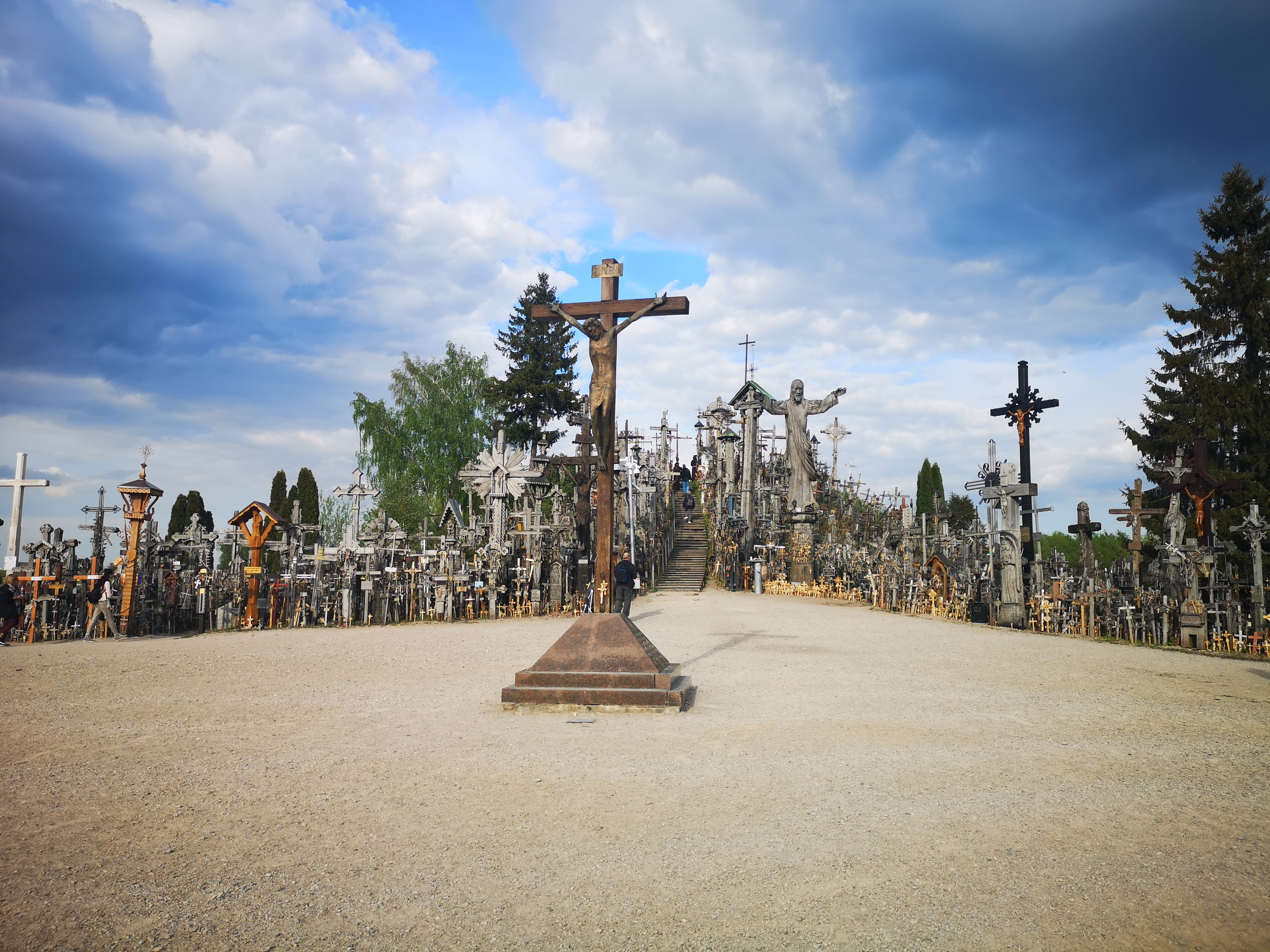
Hill of Crosses

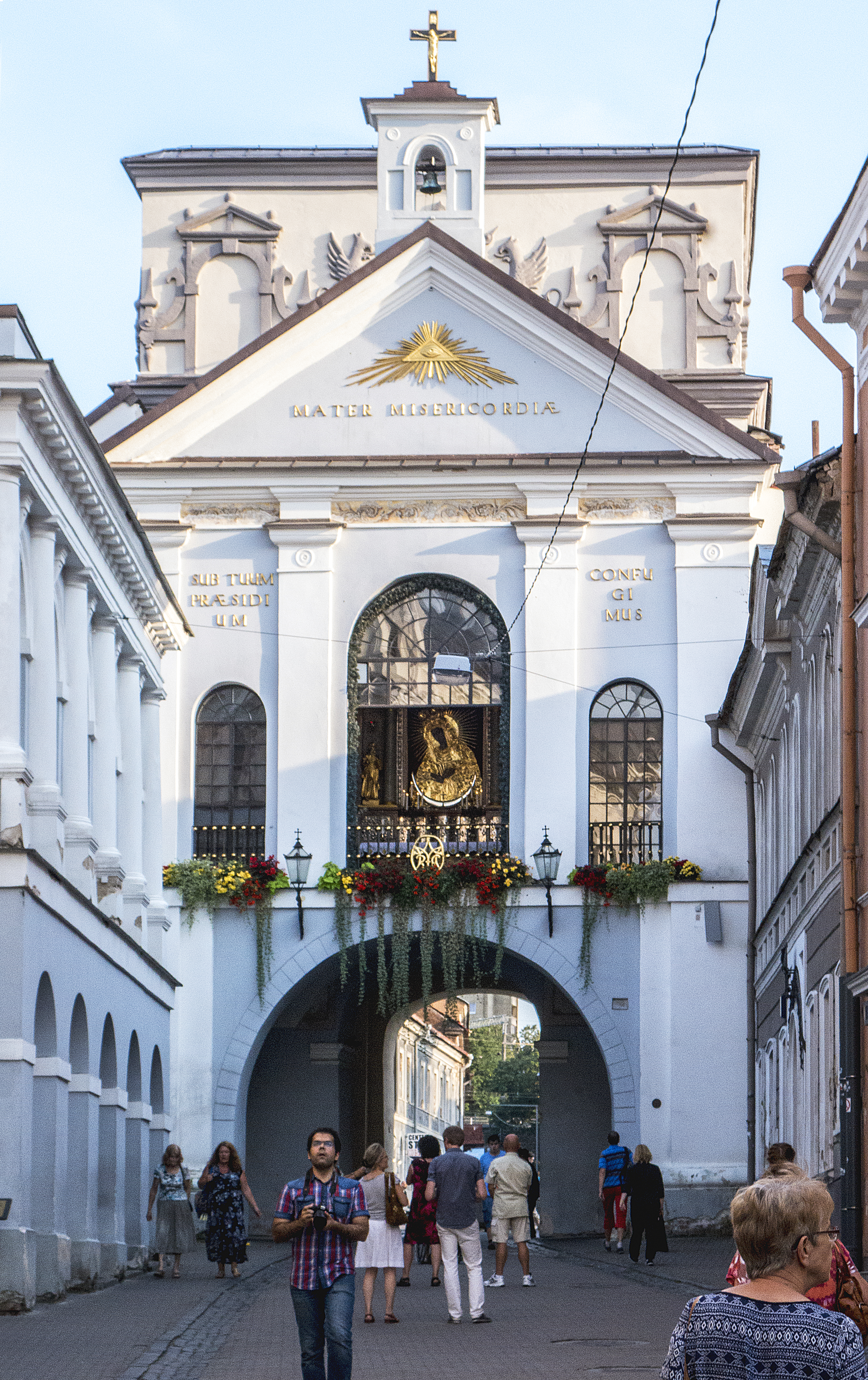
Gate of Dawn, Vilnius

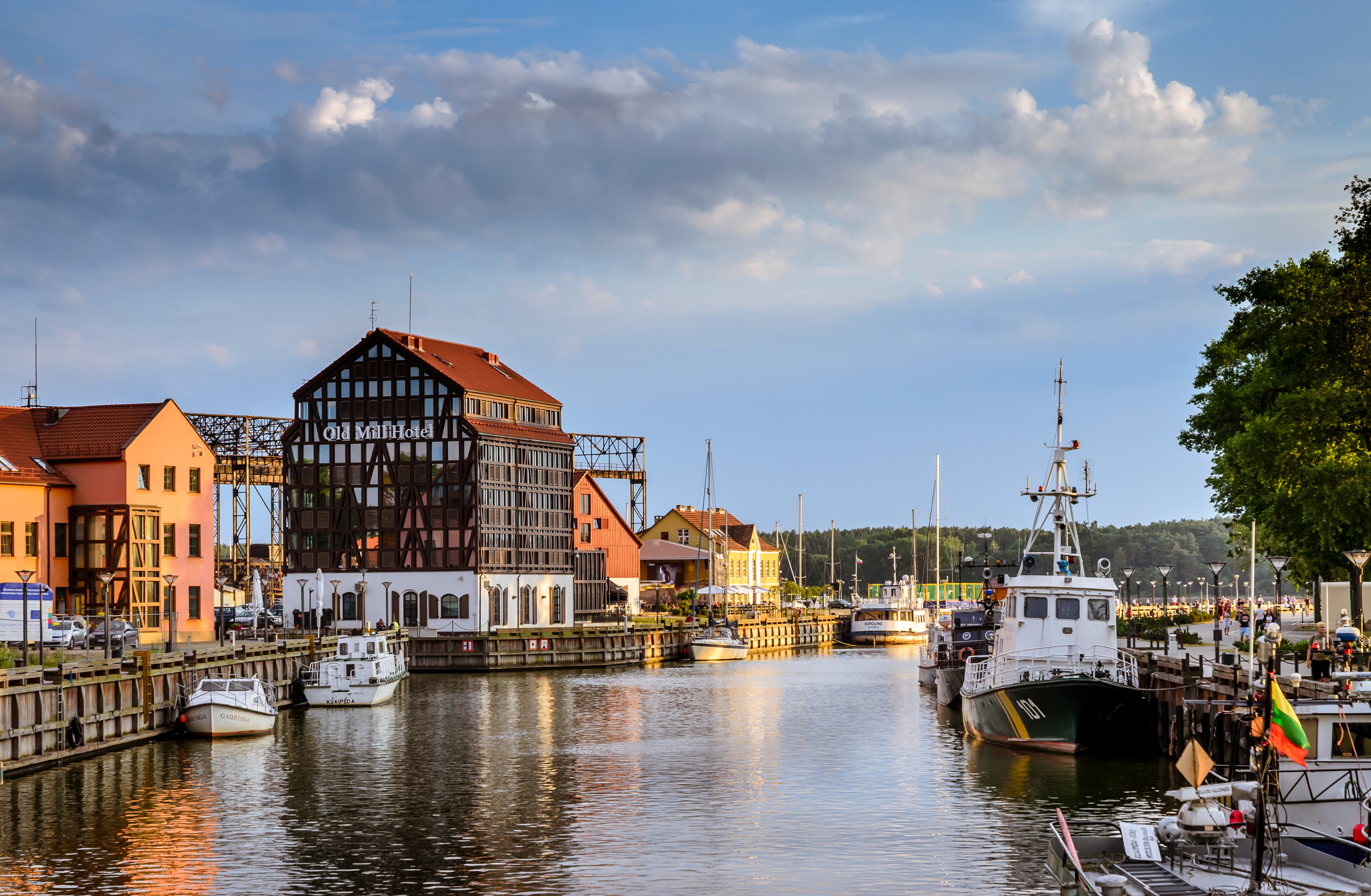
Historic houses in Klaipėda

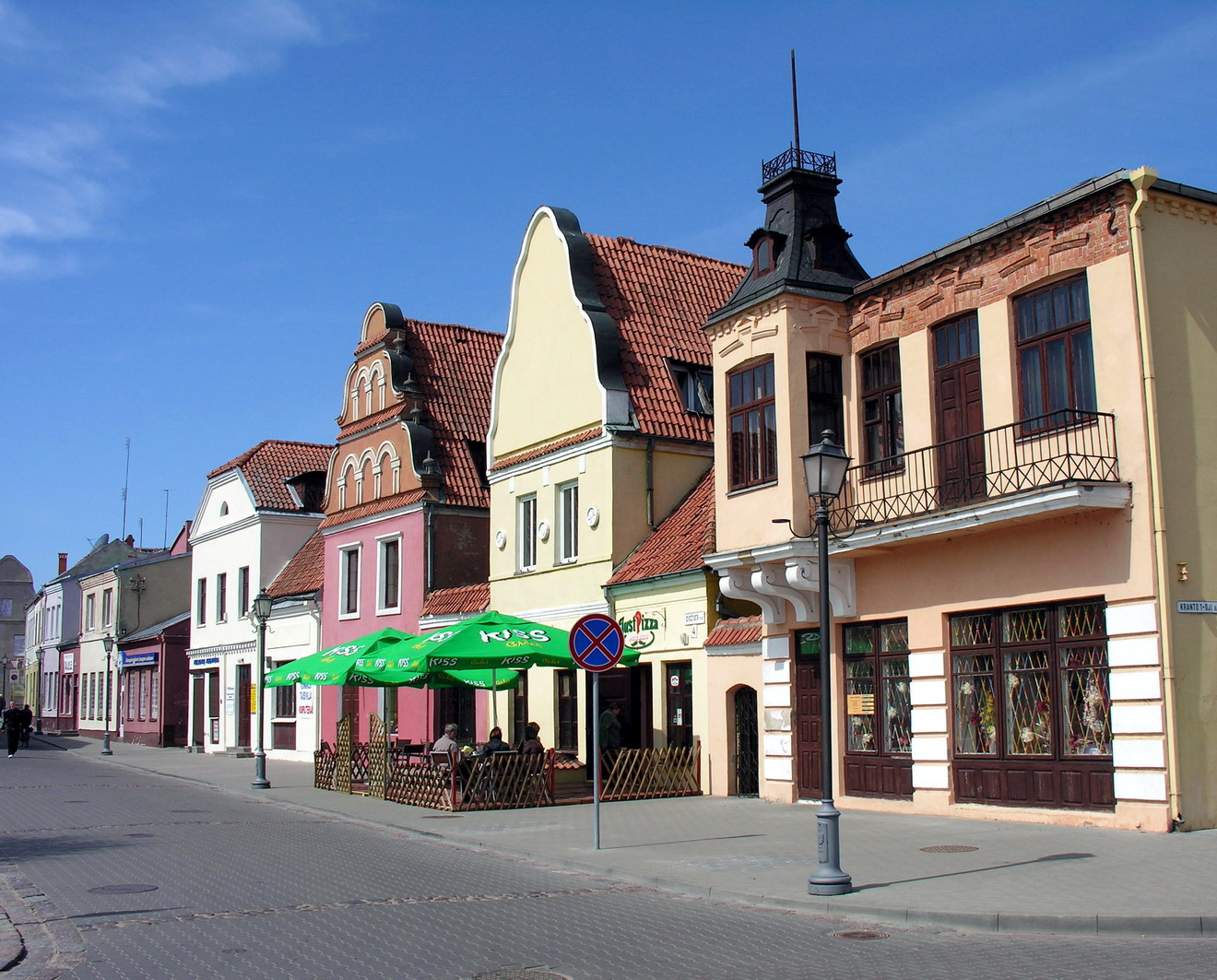
A street in Kėdainiai

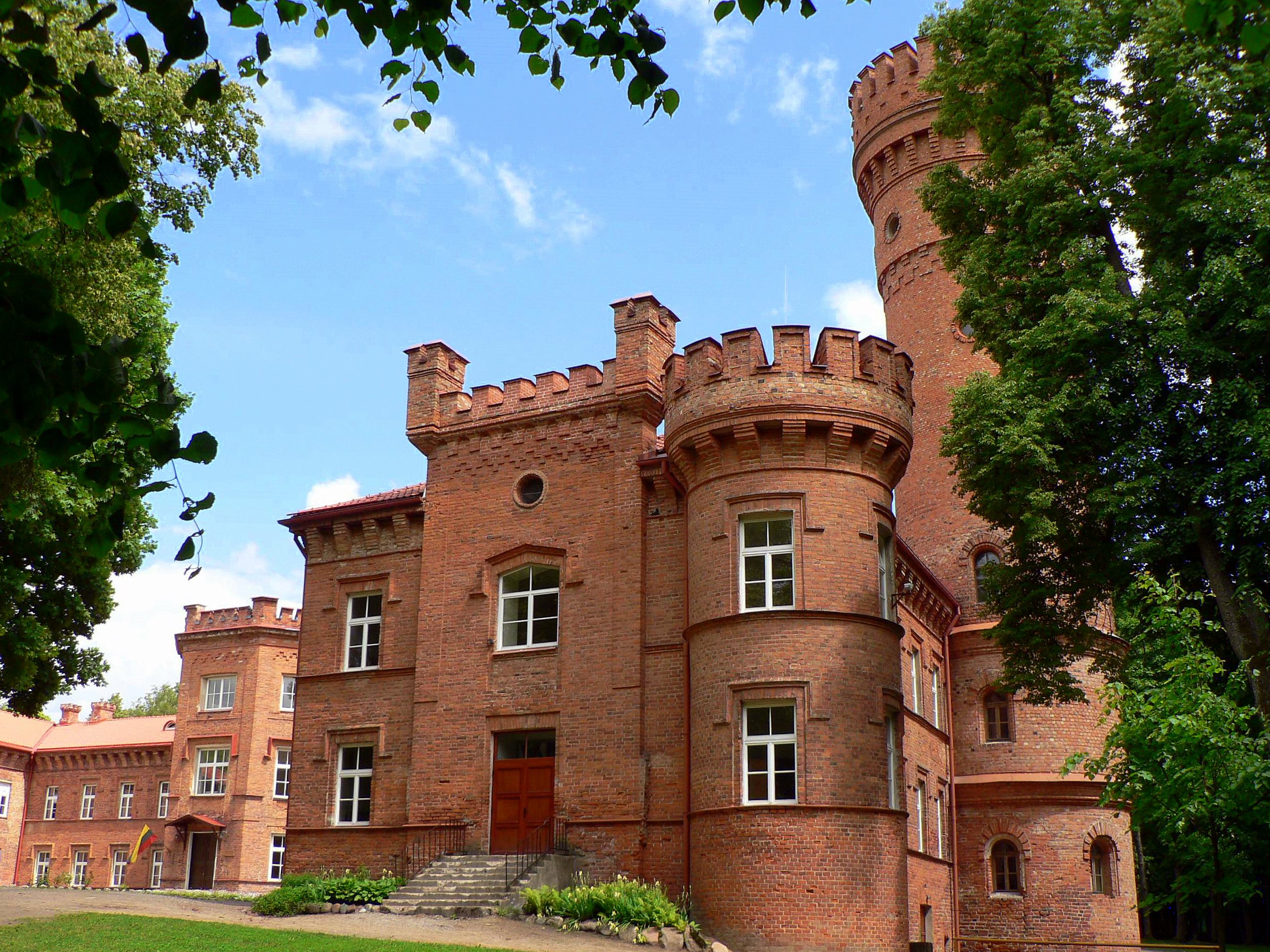
Raudonė Castle

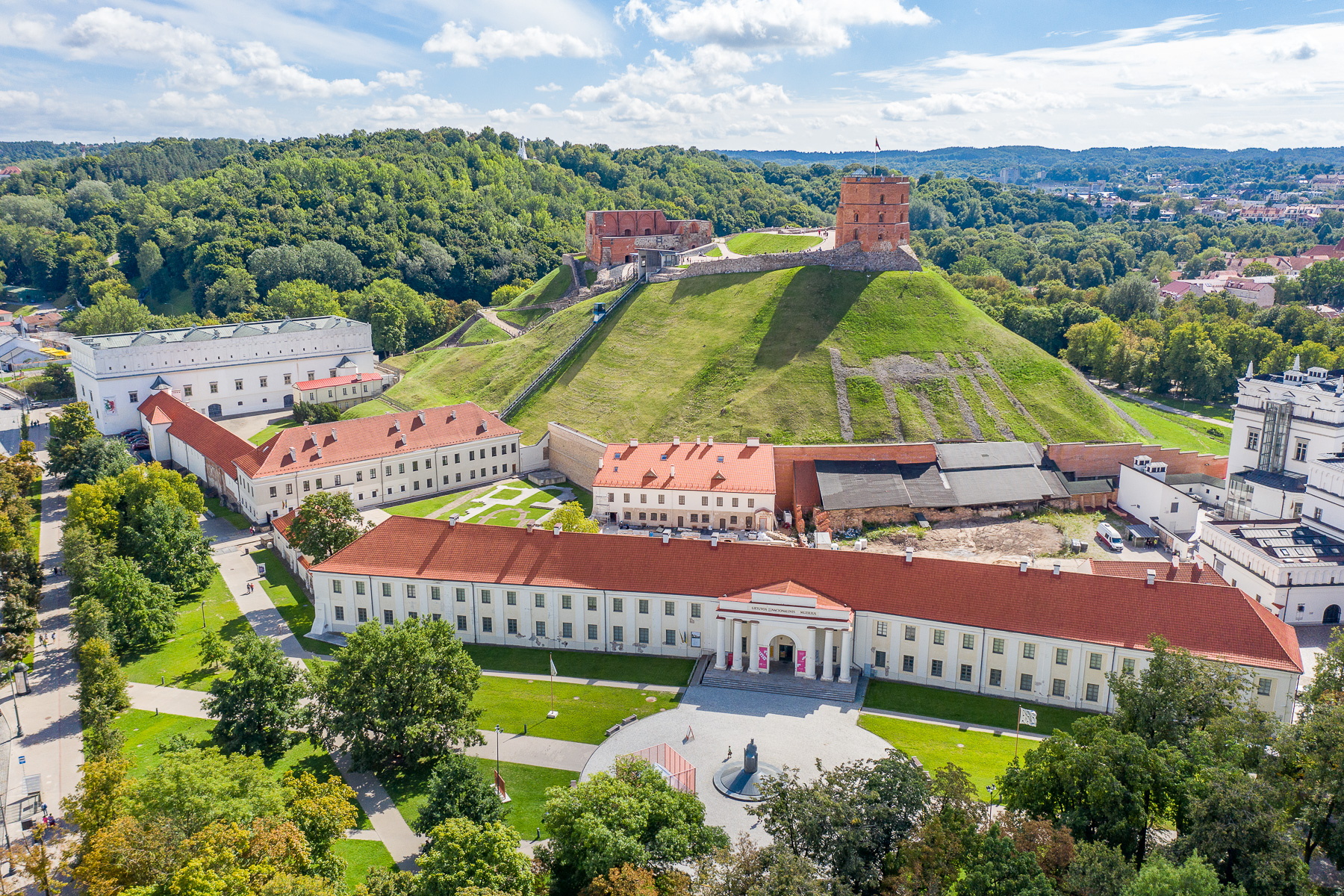
National Museum of Lithuania

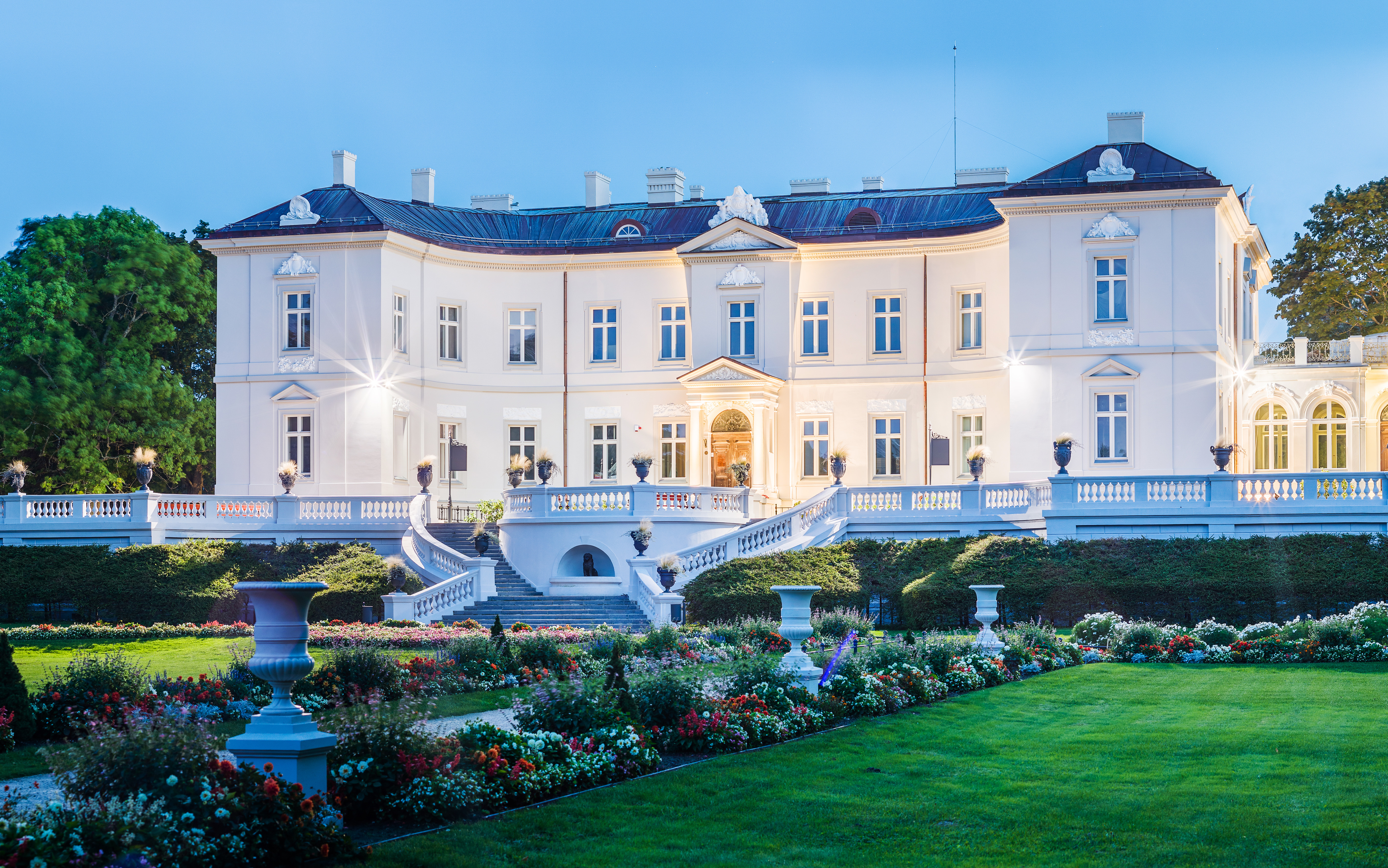
Palanga Amber Museum

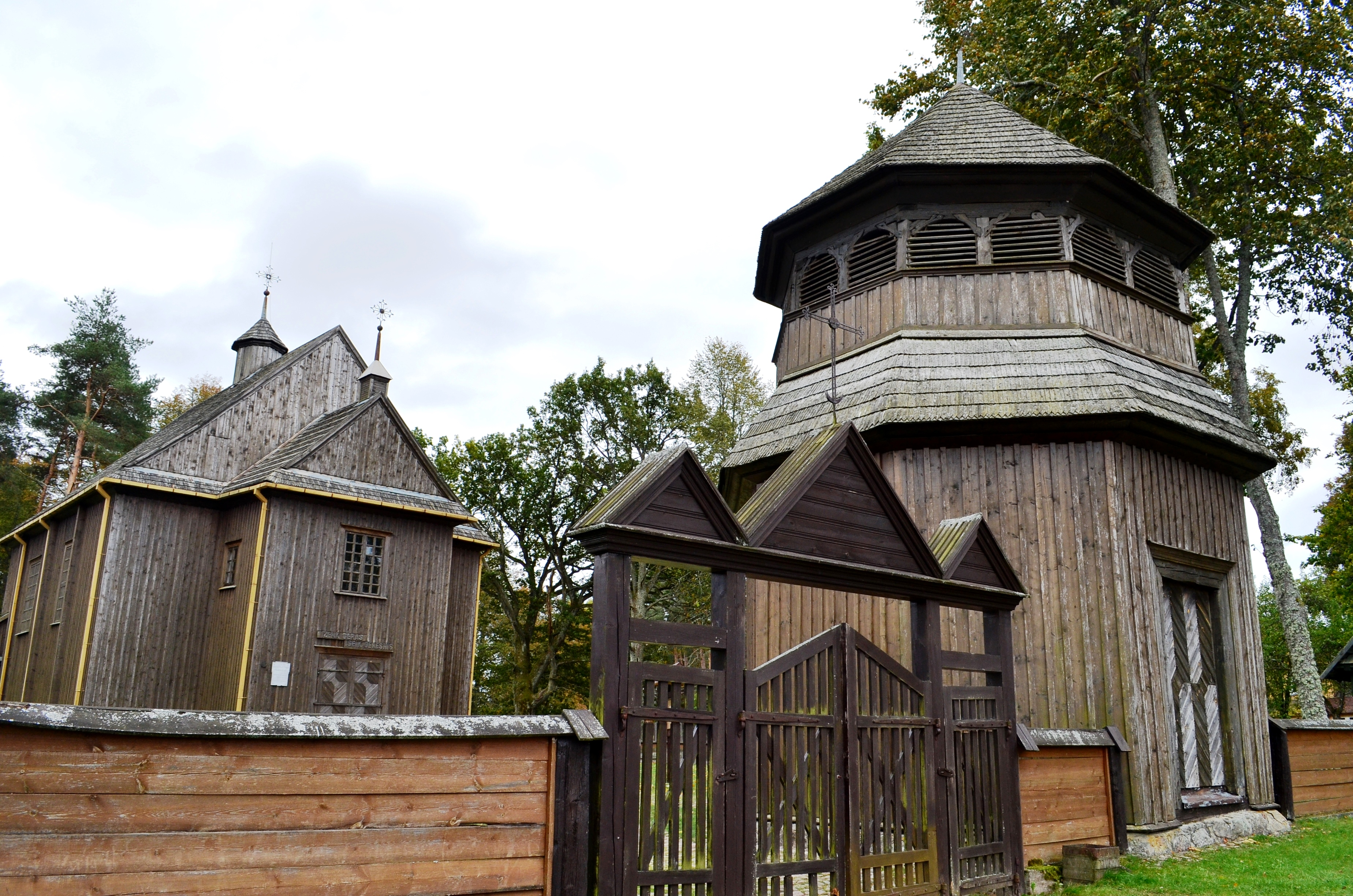
Wooden church in Palūšė

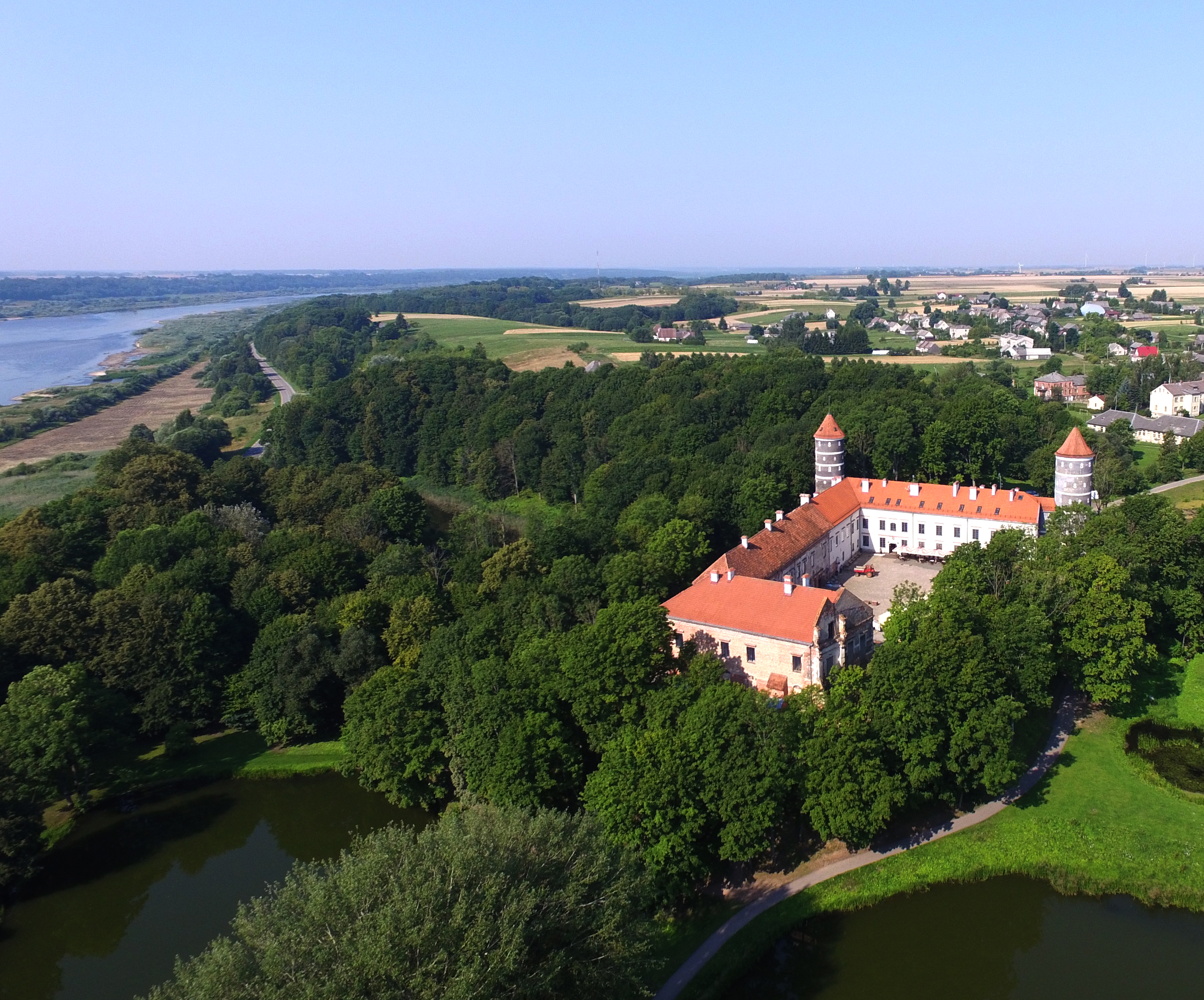
Panemunė Castle

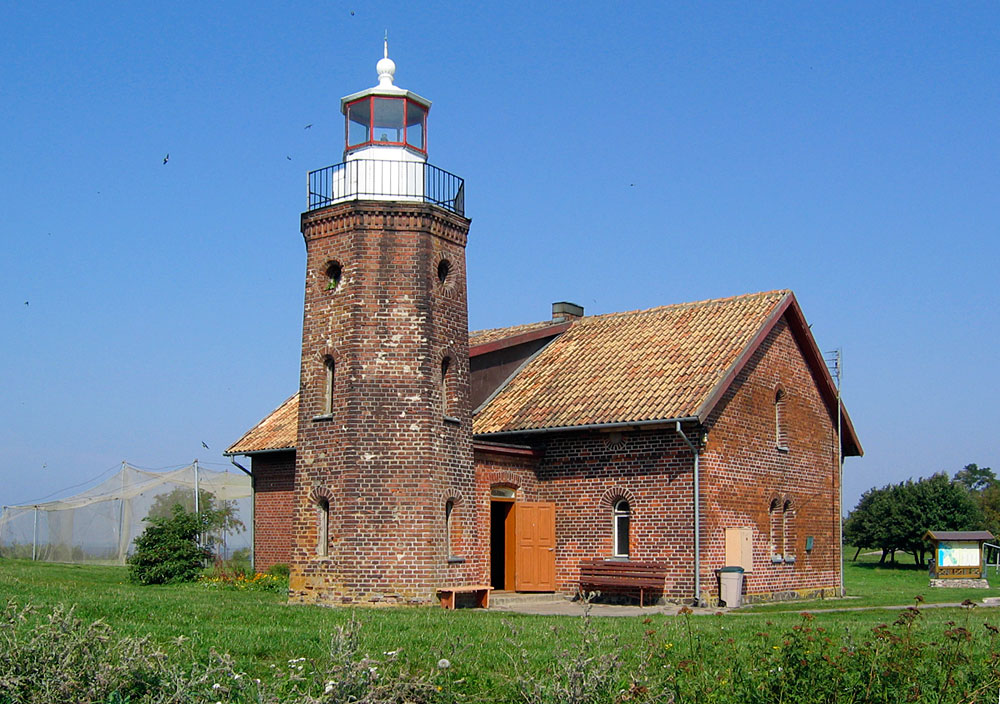
Lighthouse in Cape Ventė

== See also ==
- Culture of Lithuania
- Transport in Lithuania
- List of castles in Lithuania
- List of palaces and manor houses in Lithuania
- List of landmarks in Lithuania
- List of museums in Lithuania
- List of national parks of Lithuania
- List of regional parks of Lithuania
- Outline of Lithuania
