= List of museums in Lithuania =

This is a list of museums in Lithuania.

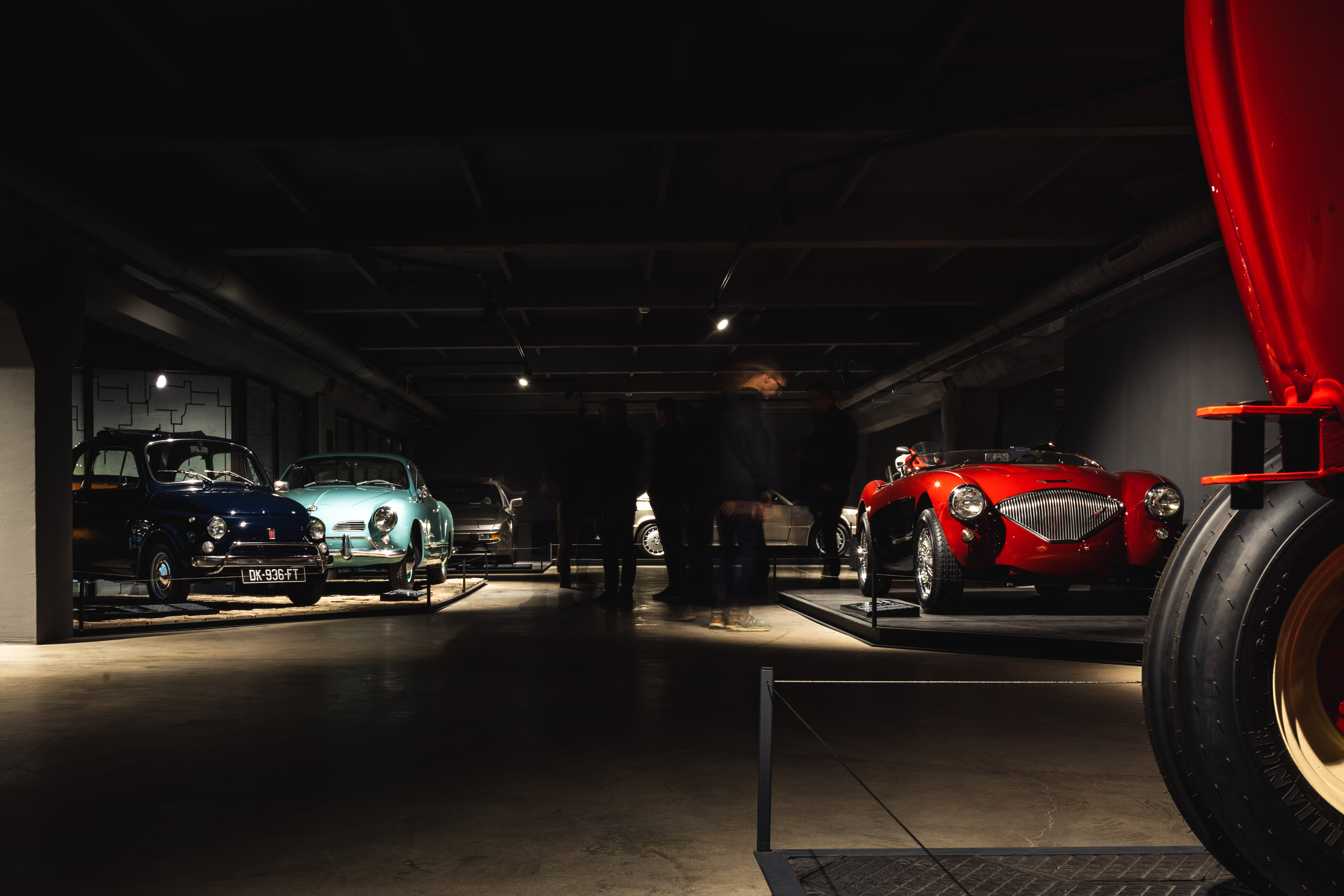
Automuseum Vilnius exhibition, Vilnius, Lithuania

- Automuseum Vilnius, Vilnius –
- Stasys Eidrigevičius – Stasys Museum, Panevėžys, Lithuania
- Biržai Castle: Regional history museum of the Selonia region of Lithuania, founded in 1928
- Communication History Museum: Museum in the Old Town of Kaunas, Lithuania
- Europos Parkas: 50-hectare open-air museum located 17 km from Vilnius, the museum presents Lithuanian and international modern art.
- Grūtas Park: Sculpture garden of Soviet-era statues and an exposition of other Soviet ideological relics from the times of the Lithuanian SSR.
- Historical Presidential Palace, Kaunas: Neo-baroque building in the Old Town of Kaunas, Lithuania that served as the Presidential Palace during the interwar years.
- House of the Signatories: Historic landmark on Pilies Street, Vilnius, where on February 16, 1918, the Act of Independence of Lithuania was signed by twenty members of the Council of Lithuania.
- Jonas Mekas Visual Arts Center: An avant-garde arts centre in Vilnius, Lithuania.
- Kaunas Museum for the Blind: The first museum for the blind in the Baltic States and one of the first in Eastern Europe.
- Klaipėda Castle: Archeological site and museum housed in a castle built by the Teutonic Knights in Klaipėda, Lithuania, near the Baltic Sea.
- Kretinga Museum: Located in Kretinga the museum contains a number of archeological finds, fine and applied art collections, folk art, and ethnographic exhibits, as well as a restored orangery.
- Lithuanian Art Museum: An art museum established in Vilnius in 1933, it houses Lithuania's largest art collection.
- Lithuanian Aviation Museum: Aviation Museum located in Kaunas, Lithuania.
- Lithuanian Road Museum: Museum that collects, displays and interprets objects related to road building.
- Lithuanian Museum of Ancient Beekeeping: Museum displays the history of beekeeping in the area. The museum, part of Aukštaitija National Park, was founded by the beekeeper Bronius Kazlas.
- M. K. Čiurlionis National Art Museum: Museum primarily dedicated to exhibiting and publicizing the works of the painter and musician M.K. Čiurlionis (1875–1911).
- MO Museum: MO Museum is a modern art museum in Vilnius, with a collection of 5,000 modern and contemporary pieces of major Lithuanian artworks from the 1950s to this day.
- Museum of Occupations and Freedom Fights: Museum is dedicated to collecting and exhibiting documents relating to the 50-year occupation of Lithuania by the Soviet Union, the anti-Soviet Lithuanian partisans, and the victims of the arrests, deportations, and executions that took place during this period.
- Museum of the History of Lithuanian Medicine and Pharmacy
- National Museum of Lithuania: A historical museum in Vilnius that encompasses several significant structures and a wide collection of written materials and artifacts. It also organizes archeological digs in Lithuania.
- Ninth Fort: The Ninth Fort museum contains collections of historical artifacts related both to Soviet atrocities and the Nazi genocide, as well as materials related to the earlier history of Kaunas and Ninth Fort.
- Palanga Amber Museum: A branch of the Lithuanian Art Museum in the restored 19th-century Tiškevičiai Palace and surrounded by the Palanga Botanical Garden. The museum's collection of amber comprises about 28,000 pieces, of which about 15,000 contain inclusions of insects, spiders, or plants.
- Povilas Stulga Museum of Lithuanian Folk Instruments: A collection of Lithuanian and international musical instruments, recordings, books, placards, photographs, and letters, located in the Old Town of Kaunas
- Museum of the Radvilas Palace: A Late Renaissance palace in the Old Town of Vilnius, Lithuania.
- Rumšiškės: Open-air ethnographic museum (established in 1966 and opened in 1974), one of the largest in Europe with 90820 exhibits, displays the heritage of Lithuanian rural life in a vast collection of authentic resurrected buildings where the Lithuanian people lived and worked.
- Stalag Luft VI: Site of German prisoner-of-war camp during World War II located near the town of Šilutė.
- Tadas Ivanauskas Zoological Museum: The museum in Kaunas that collects and exhibits various animals: hunting trophies, stuffed animals, insect collections, skeletons, dissections.
- Tuskulėnai Manor: Neoclassical manor in Žirmūnai elderate of Vilnius converted into a memorial to the victims of Soviet repressions.
- Vilna Gaon Jewish State Museum: Museum dedicated to the historical and cultural heritage of Lithuanian Jews.
- Vilnius Castle Complex: Group of cultural, and historic structures on the left bank of the Neris River, near its confluence with the Vilnia River.
- Vytautas the Great War Museum: Museum in Kaunas displays historical artefacts pertaining to Lithuania and Kaunas from prehistoric times to the present day, including a large collection of historical weapons.
- Žmuidzinavičius Museum: Known as the Devils' Museum, the Žmuidzinavičius Museum is a museum in Kaunas, Lithuania, dedicated to collecting and exhibiting sculptures and carvings of devils from all over the world.

== See also ==
- List of museums
- Tourism in Lithuania
- Culture of Lithuania
