= List of landmarks in Lithuania =

This is a list of landmarks in Lithuania.

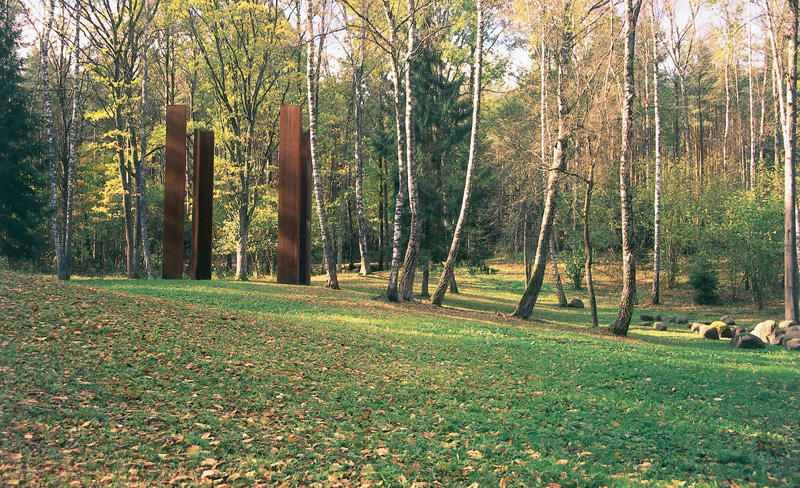
The Place by G.Karosas at Europos Parkas, Open-Air Museum of the Centre of Europe

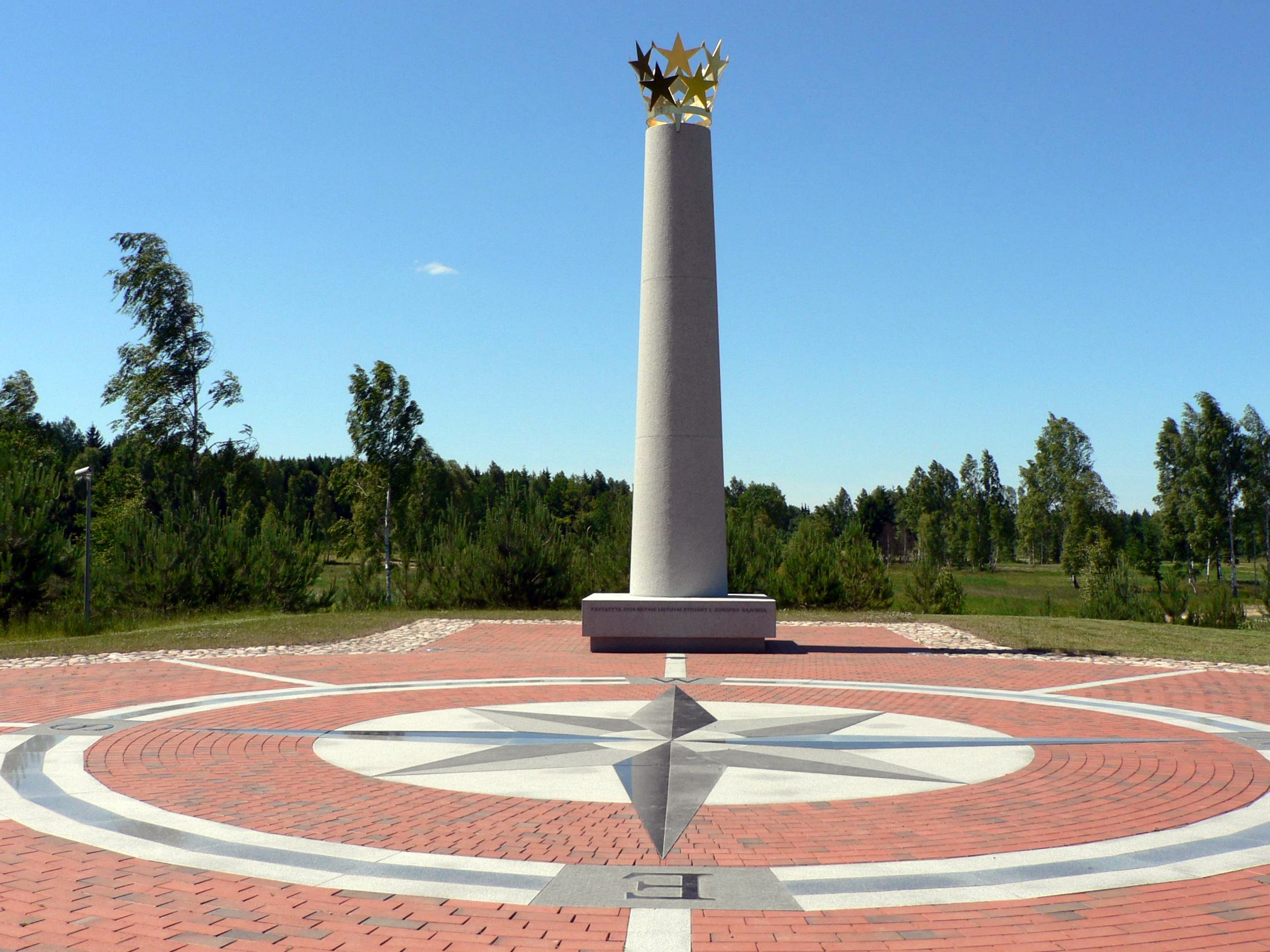
Geographical Centre of Europe monument in Lithuania

== landmarks ==
- Europos Parkas
- Gediminas Tower
- Geographical Center of Europe
- Grūtas Park
- Hill of Crosses
- Palanga Amber Museum
- Rambynas
- Stelmužė Oak
- Three Crosses
- Trakai Island Castle
- Trakai Peninsula Castle

== See also ==
- Castles in Lithuania
- Tourism in Lithuania
