= Minija (village) =

- Village
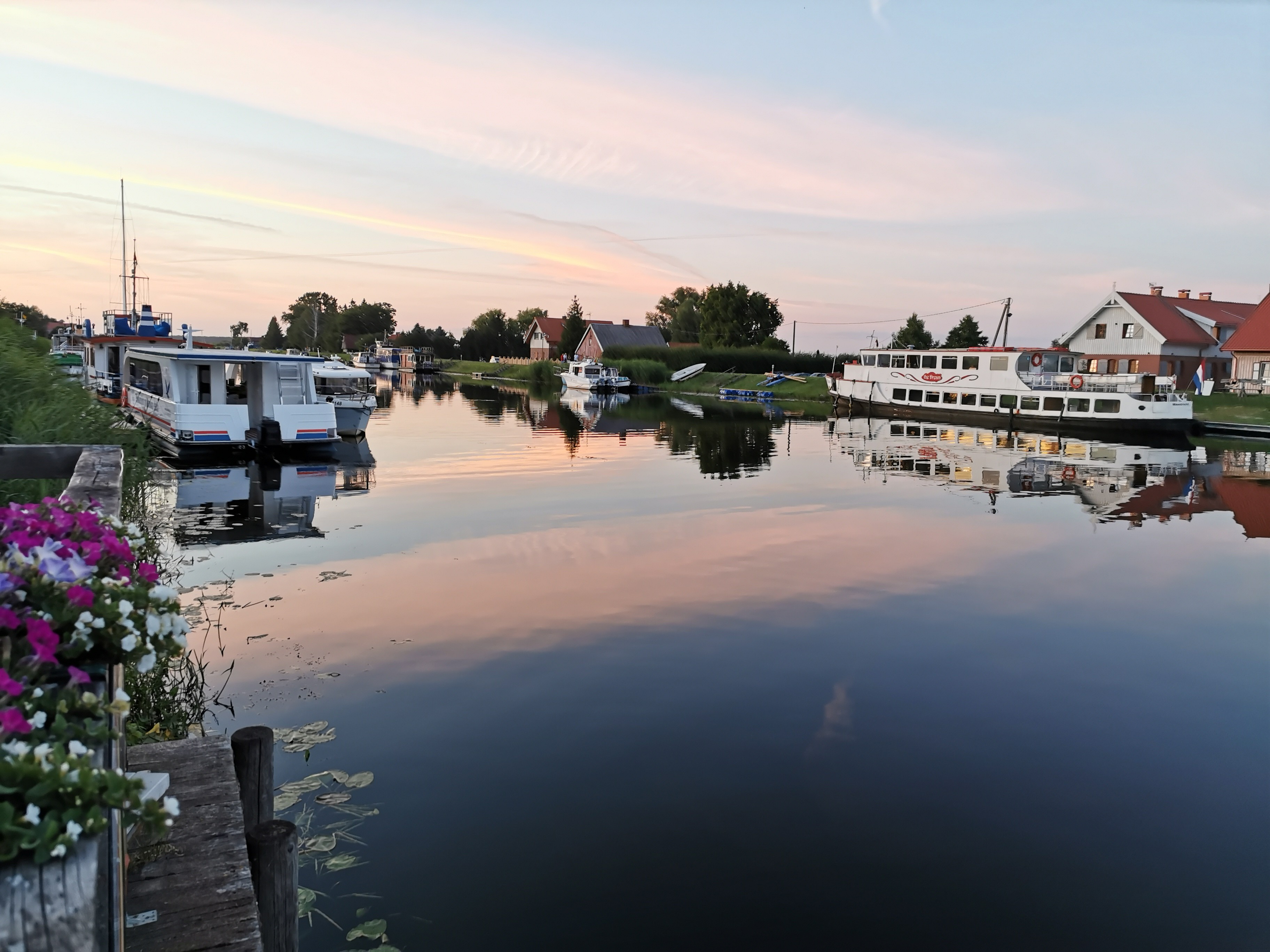
- Dock in Minija

- Location of Minija
- Coordinates: 55°21′46″N 21°16′58″E
- Country: Lithuania
- Ethnographic region: Lithuania Minor
- County: Klaipėda County
- Municipality: Šilutė District Municipality
- Eldership: Kintai Eldership
- First mentioned: 16th century

Population (2011)
  - Total: 25
- Time zone: UTC+2 (EET)
  - Summer (DST): UTC+3 (EEST)

Minija or Mingė (in older texts also Minė, often nicknamed Lithuanian Venice) is a small fishermen's village in Šilutė District Municipality in western Lithuania on Minija river, and is part of Nemunas Delta Regional Park. This village is unique in Lithuania as the main "road" is the river. Houses are situated on both banks and there is no bridge to connect them. The only way to get around is to use a boat. In 1997 it had 48 residents. It is part of Lithuania Minor.

== History ==
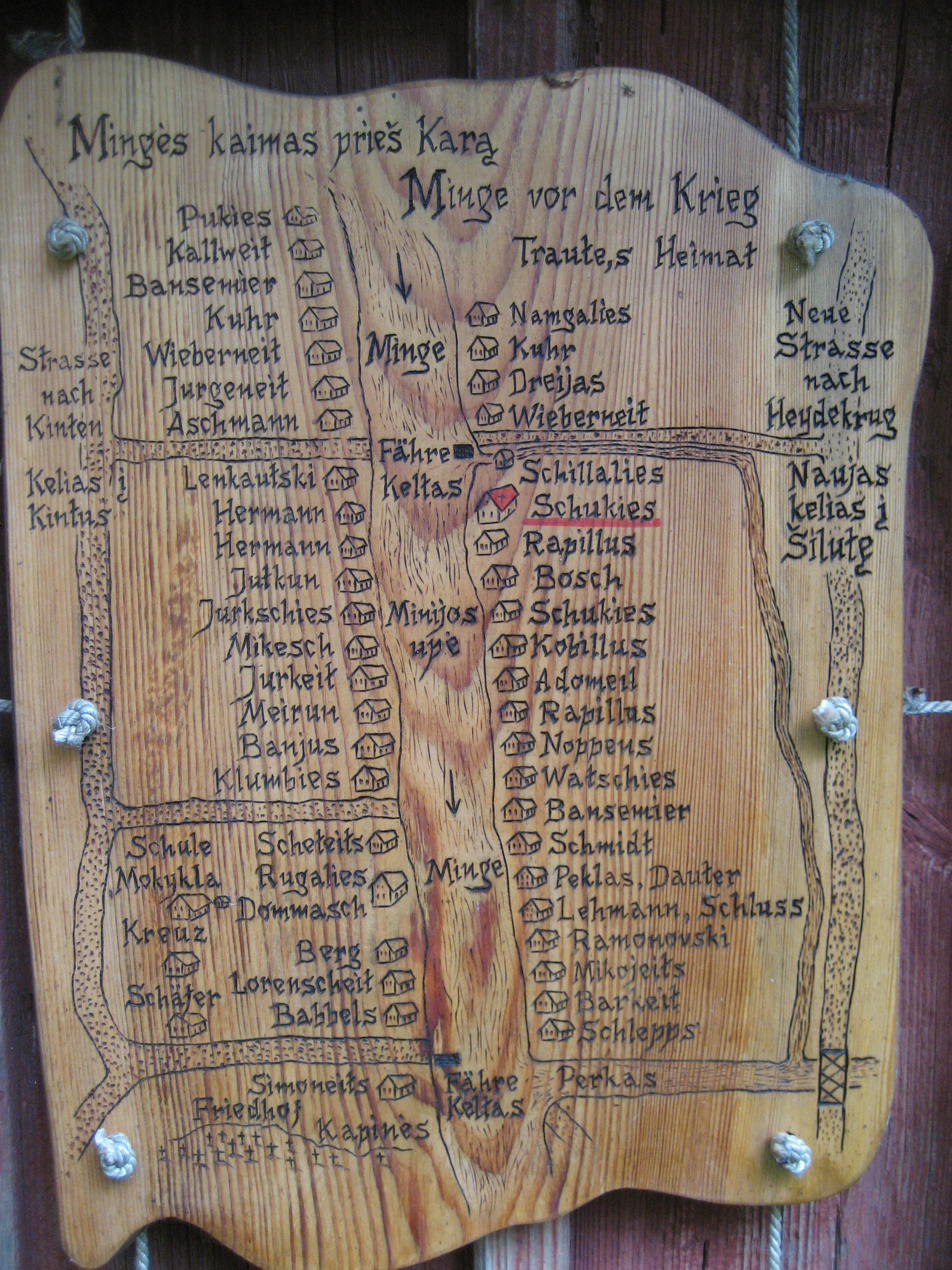
Plan of pre-World War II village

The village was first mentioned in the 16th century. Traditional peasant buildings survive from the end of the 19th or beginning of the 20th centuries and are of architectural value. Minija reached its peak in the middle of the 19th century when the number of the inhabitants reached 406. As of 1856, it had a population of 366. The government decided to build levees only on the left bank of Nemunas in order to save money. The right side was left unprotected against annual spring flooding. As Minija was subject to frequent floods, the village did not have its own cemetery. People were buried in nearby Ventė. After World War II, the numbers of residents grew from 42 in 1943 to 124 in 1970. However, at the time only three families remained of the original pre-war Lietuvininks population.

Minija village is becoming a popular rural and water tourism center as it is located close to the Baltic Sea, Curonian Lagoon, and all major seaside resorts.

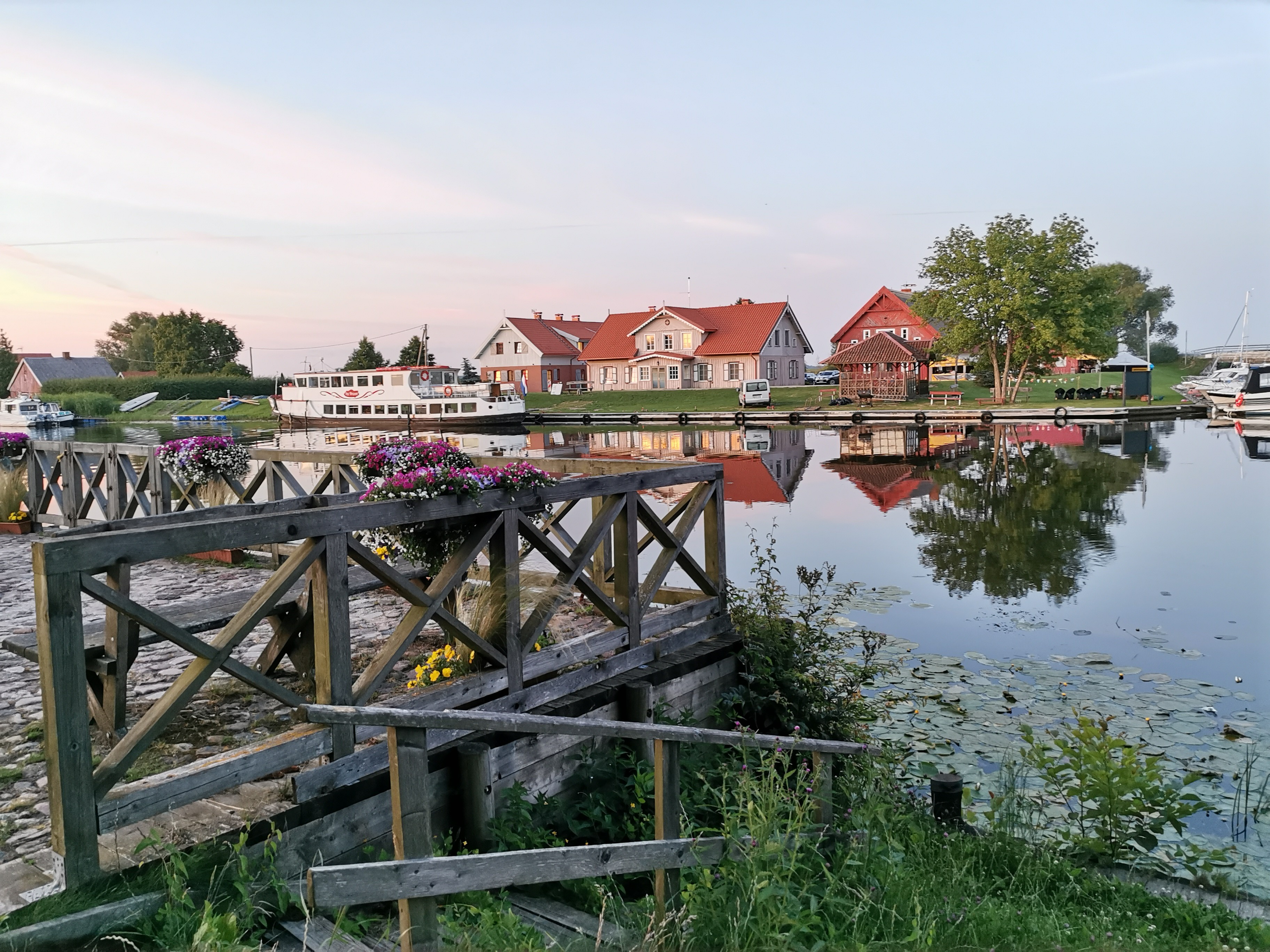
Another view of Minija village
