= Juodieji Lakajai =

Lake in eastern Lithuania

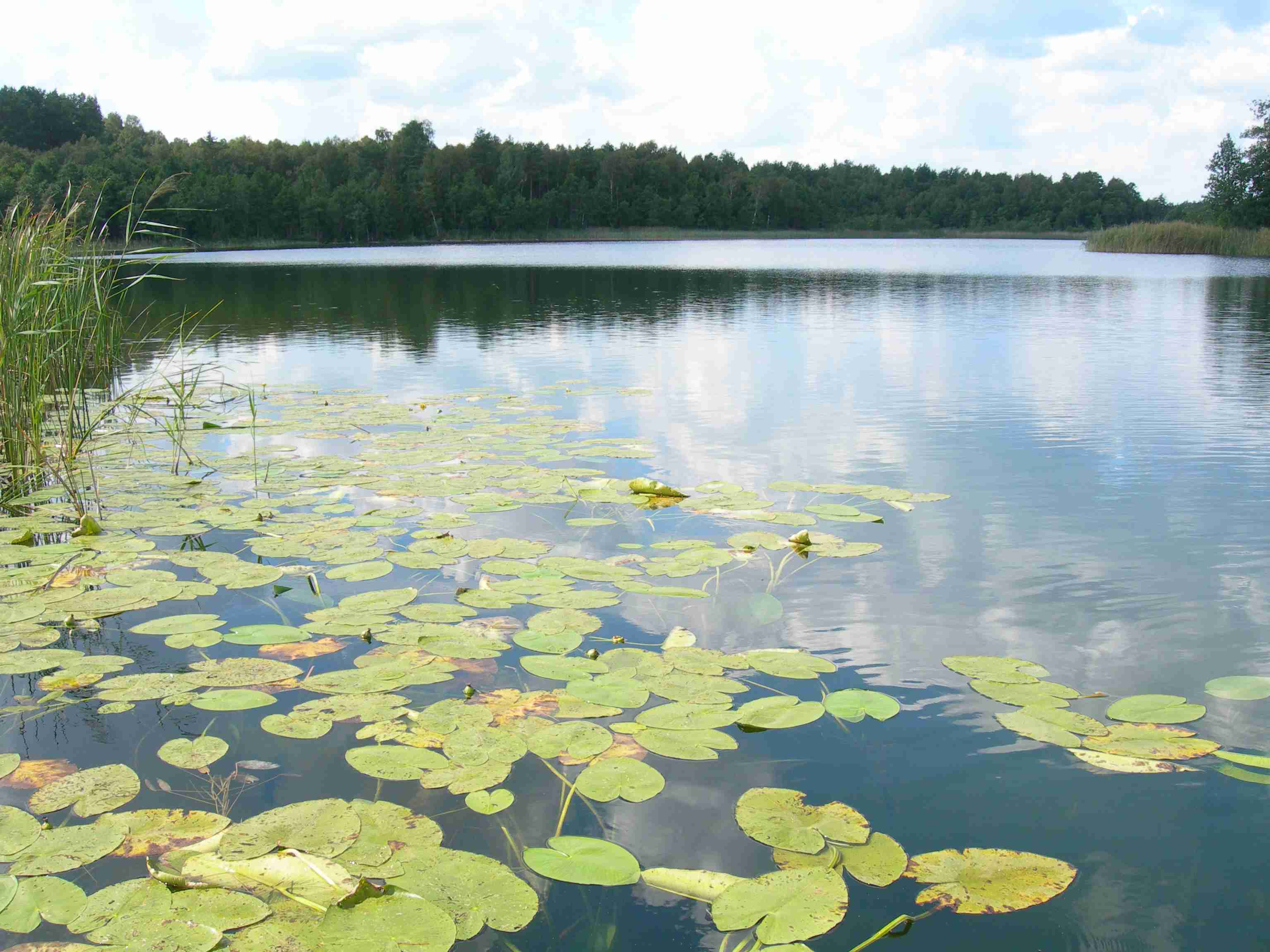

- Location within Lithuania
- Location: Molėtai District, Lithuania
- Coordinates: 55°11′23″N 25°38′48″E
- Type: Glacial
- Primary inflows: Kertuojos stream, JL-1, 2 unnamed streams
- Primary outflows: Lakaja
- Surface area: 3.941 km^{2} (1.522 sq mi)
- Average depth: 8.2 m (27 ft)
- Max. depth: 32.8 m (108 ft)
- Shore length^{1}: 20 km (12 mi)
- ^{1} Shore length is not a well-defined measure.

Juodieji Lakajai is a lake in eastern Lithuania, in the eastern part of Molėtai District Municipality, near the border with Švenčionys District, about 12 km (7.5 mi) east of Molėtai, located in the Labanoras Regional Park. The lake extends 7.15 km (4.44 mi) from northwest to southeast, with a maximum width of 1.2 km (0.75 mi). Altitude is 145 m (476 ft). The shoreline is very winding, with a total length of 20 km (12 mi) (22.6 km (14.0 mi) including islands). The shores are dry, high and forested. There are eight islands in the lake: England Island (5.02 ha (12.4 acres)) and seven small unnamed ones. In the northern and north-eastern parts, are the peninsulas (Ščiuro Cape and Cibaragis). The beach is narrow, covered with sand. The bottom has deep pits and is covered with mud. The lake is surrounded by the forests of Lakajai, Inturkė, Juodenėnai and Rašia.

The lake connects in the north to Baltieji Lakajai lake via the 60 m wide Pertenis Strait. The Kertuojos stream flows in from Kertuojai lake to the south and to the east, the lake flows out via the Lakaja River, which is a tributary of the Žeimena. The lake's water exchange rate is 153%.

Fish species in Juodieji Lakajai include vendace, smelt, roach, bleak, Northern pike, rudd, tench, perch, and introduced bream, eel.

The villages of Kertuojai and Joniškė are located near the lake. A protected twin-trunk pine grows on the north-eastern shore. There are two campsites. The south-eastern shore is bordered by a road and the eastern shore forms the boundary with Švenčionys District Municipality.
