= Joniškis Eldership (Molėtai) =

Eldership of Lithuania

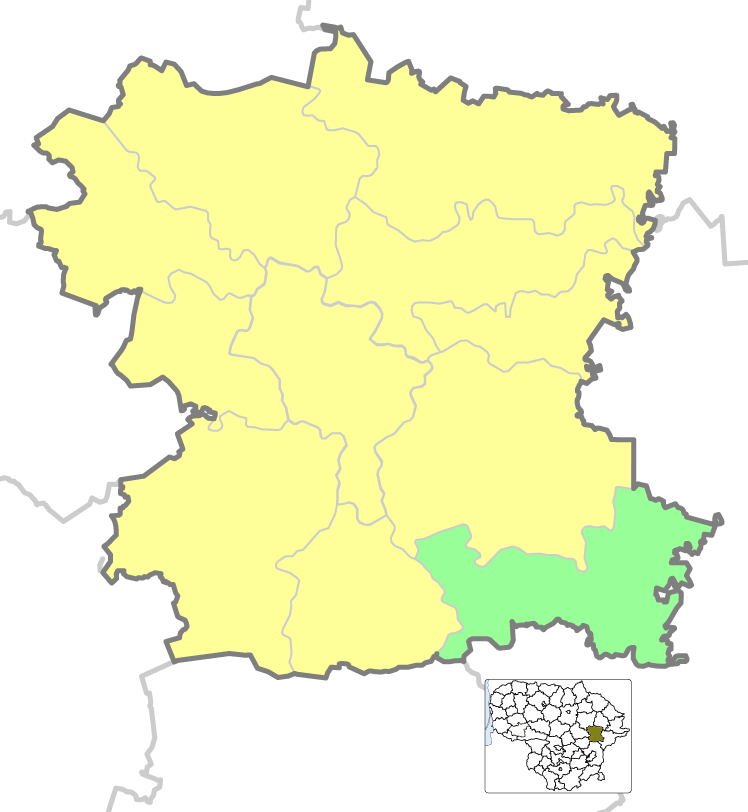
Location map of Joniškis Eldership in Molėtai District Municipality

The Joniškis Eldership (Lithuanian: Joniškio seniūnija) is an eldership of Lithuania, located in the Molėtai District Municipality. In 2021 its population was 978.
