= Joniškis (disambiguation) =

Joniškis is a town in Lithuania.

Joniškis may also refer to:

- Joniškis, Molėtai, a small town in Utena County, Lithuania
- Joniškis (Ignalina), a village in Ignalina District Municipality, Lithuania
