= Suginčiai Eldership =

Eldership of Lithuania

The Suginčiai Eldership (Lithuanian: Suginčių seniūnija) is an eldership of Lithuania, located in the Molėtai District Municipality. In 2021 its population was 1407.
