= Čiulėnai Eldership =

Eldership of Lithuania

The Čiulėnai Eldership (Lithuanian: Čiulėnų seniūnija) is an eldership of Lithuania, located in the Molėtai District Municipality. In 2021 its population was 1199.
