= Alanta =

Town in Molėtai District Municipality, Lithuania

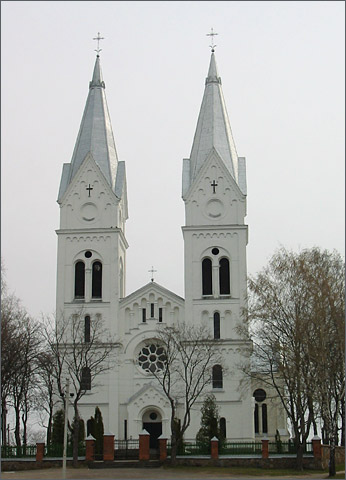
- St. Jacob's church in Alanta

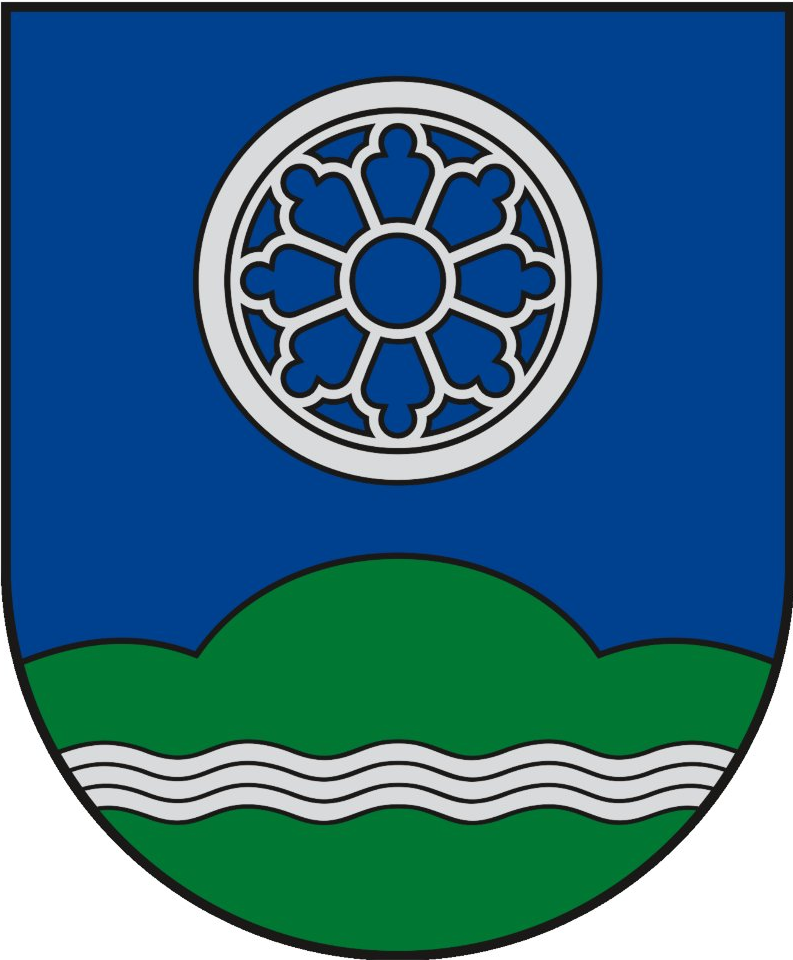
- Coat of arms
- Nickname: Alunta
- Location of Alanta
- Coordinates: 55°21′N 25°17′E
- Country: Lithuania
- Ethnographic region: Aukštaitija
- County: Utena County
- Municipality: Molėtai district municipality
- Elderate: Alanta elderate
- Seat of: Alanta elderate
- First mentioned: 1436

Population (2011)
  - Total: 348
- Time zone: UTC+2 (EET)
  - Summer (DST): UTC+3 (EEST)

Alanta (dialectal Aukštaitian name Alunta, Polish: Owanta, Yiddish אַוואָנטע) is a small town in Molėtai district municipality, Lithuania. It is the administrative seat of the Alanta Elderate. According to a census in 2011, Alanta had 348 residents. It is situated at the crossing of two roads: Molėtai–Anykščiai and Utena–Alanta–Ukmergė. The town's St. Jacob's church was built in 1909.

The Synagogue of Alanta is one of only 17 surviving wooden synagogues in Lithuania.

== Etymology of the name ==
The name of the town is derived from the Alanta River, tributary of Virinta. The name of the river is derived from an ancient Lithuanian verb "alėti", which means 'to stream merrily' or 'to run'.

== History ==
In 1436, Sigismund Kestutaitis granted Alanta to Kristinas Astikas to commend him for his aid in defeating Švitrigaila in the Lithuanian Civil War (1431–1435). In the 16th century, the town's Catholic church was built, and in 1581 the Grand Duke of Lithuania Stefan Batory gifted Alanta to Gáspár Békés (Lithuanian: Kasparas Bekešas), a Hungarian general. After 1598 the town belonged to Radziwiłł family and from 1828 until the World War I it belonged to the Pamarnacki family. From the 18th century to the Lithuanian Uprising of 1863, Alanta had a parish school.

Alanta suffered heavily from many wars, including Napoleon's invasion of the Russian Empire, World War I and World War II, because of its location on the crossing of two important roads.

The entire Jewish community of 30 families, which comprised the majority of the population of Alanta, was killed during the Holocaust in August 1941. Alanta has a rare, surviving wooden synagogue.

== Palace of Alanta estate ==
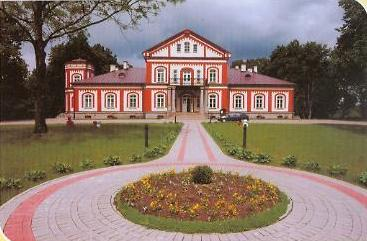
Renovated Alanta estate, located in Naujasodis suburb

The palace of the estate, which houses a library and an ethnographic museum, has been renovated and its park trimmed. The founder of the Alanta library, Elvyra Satkūnaitė, was named "The best librarian of Lithuania" in 1996.
