= Giedraičiai Eldership =

Eldership of Lithuania

The Giedraičiai Eldership (Lithuanian: Giedraičių seniūnija) is an eldership of Lithuania, located in the Molėtai District Municipality. In 2021 its population was 1648.
