= Inturkė Eldership =

Eldership of Lithuania

The Inturkė Eldership (Lithuanian: Inturkės seniūnija) is an eldership of Lithuania, located in the Molėtai District Municipality. In 2021 its population was 1096.
