= Balninkai =

- Town
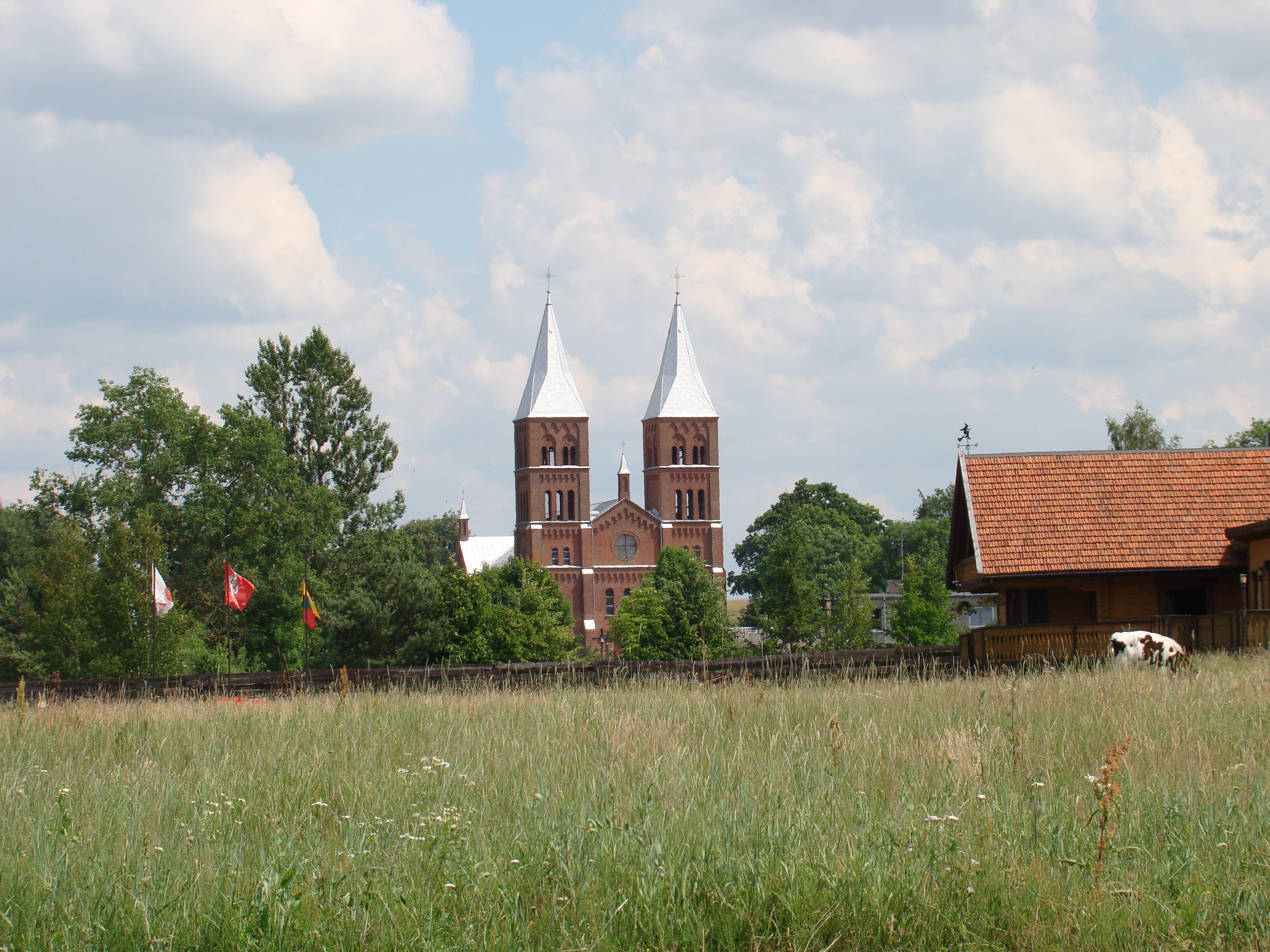

- Seal

- Location within Lithuania
- Coordinates: 55°17′38″N 25°7′8″E
- Country: Lithuania
- County: Utena County
- Municipality: Molėtai district municipality
- Eldership: Balninkai eldership

Population (2011)
  - Total: 319
- Time zone: UTC+2 (EET)
  - Summer (DST): UTC+3 (EEST)

Balninkai (Polish: Bolniki) is a town in Utena County, Lithuania. According to the 2011 census, the town has a population of 319 people.
