= Marius Ivaškevičius =

Lithuanian screenwriter, journalist and author

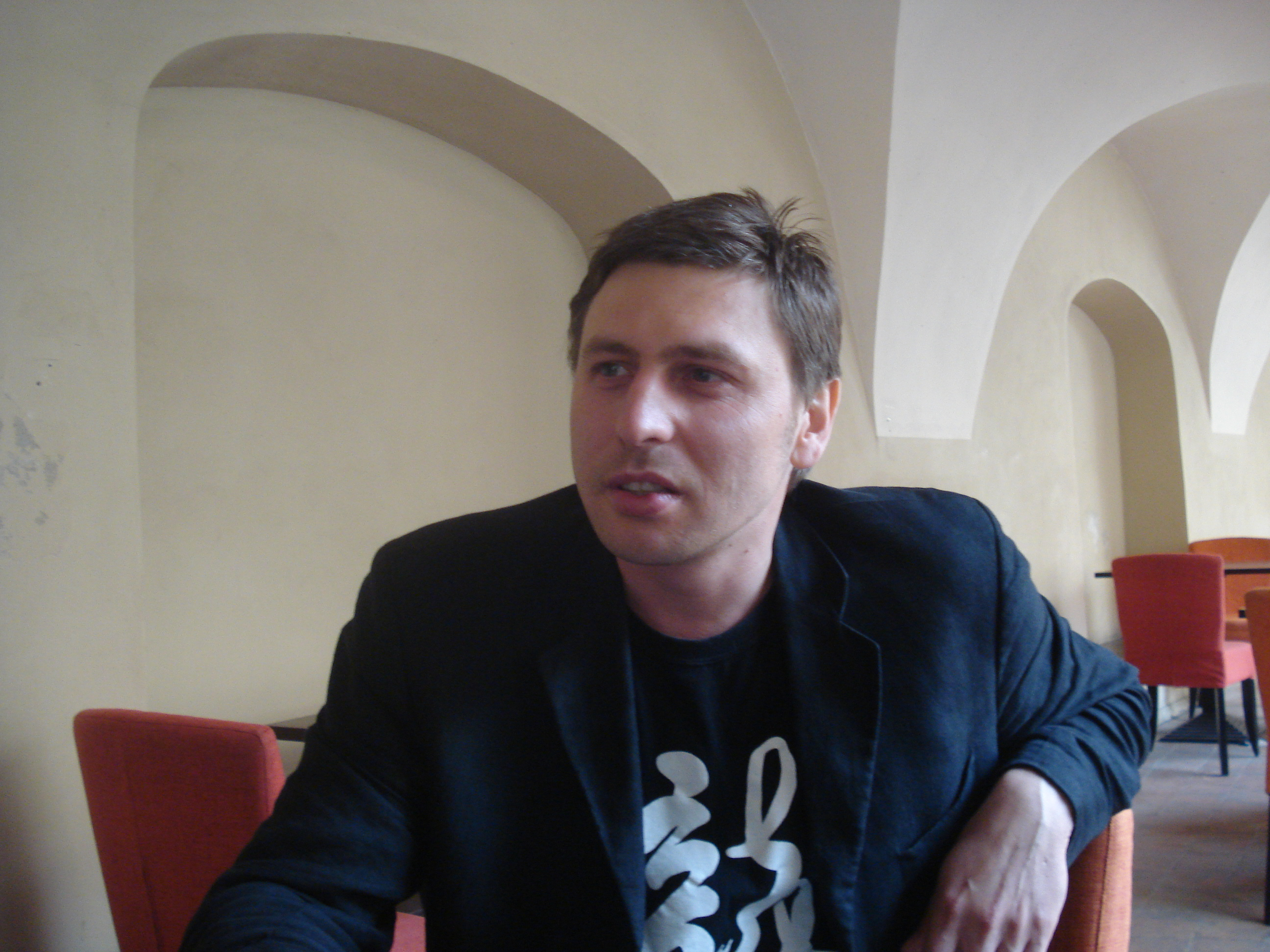
Marius Ivaškevičius, 2008

Marius Ivaškevičius (born March 26, 1973 in Molėtai ) is a Lithuanian prose writer, playwright, screenwriter, and film director.

== Works ==
=== Books ===
- 2002: Žali (The Men in Green)
  Žali: romanas. Vilnius: Tyto alba, 2002. 327 p. ISBN 9986-16-259-9
  The novel is based on historical facts about the Lithuanian guerilla fighting. The protagonist is guerilla leader Jonas Žemaitis.
  German translation: Die Grünen, Translated by Markus Roduner. Oberhausen: Athena Verlag, 2012
- 1998: History from a Cloud (Istorija nuo debesies), debut novel
  Istorija nuo debesies: vieno liūdesio dviejų dalių kelias: romanas. Vilnius: Lietuvos rašytojų sąjungos leidykla, 1998. 262 p. ISBN 9986-39-064-8
- 1996: Why Children (Kam vaiku), debut; short story collection
  Kam vaikų: novelės. Vilnius: Lietuvos rašytojų sąjungos leidykla, 1996. 104 p. ISBN 9986-39-005-2

=== Plays and screenpays ===
- 2000:The Neighbour (Kaimynas), debut play
- Expulsion. Chronicle of One Apple
  Išvarymas: vieno obuolio kronika: pjesė. Vilnius: Apostrofa, 2012. 161 p. ISBN 978-9955-605-72-0
  Its production by Hendrik Toompere Jr at the Estonian Drama Theatre earned Toompere the Best Director award at the Estonian Theatre Awards in 2016
- Kant
- The Totalitarian Novel
  based on the author’s travels to authoritarian states in Central Asia
- Vikingų žygis į Apuolę (teksto autorius). Kaunas: Tvermė, 1998. 32 p.: iliustr. ISBN 9986-476-19-4
- Artimas: pjesių trilogija. Vilnius: Tyto alba, 2002. 219 p. ISBN 9986-16-252-1
- Purpuriniai dūmai (Purple smoke), Vilnius: Kronta, 2003. 55 p. ISBN 9986-879-91-4
  Screenplay based on the motives of the short story Лиловый дым by Feliks Roziner. The screenplay was awarded the Grand Prix in TransEuroScript, Bucarest, in 2001.
- Madagaskaras: trijų veiksmų pjesė. Vilnius: Apostrofa: Teatro ir kino informacijos ir edukacijos centras, 2004. 114 p.: iliustr. ISBN 9955-605-07-3
  The prototype of the main hero of "Madagascar", Kazimieras Pokštas, is Kazys Pakštas
- Artimas miestas: dviejų veiksmų drama. Vilnius: Apostrofa: Teatro ir kino informacijos ir edukacijos centras, 2005. 59 p.: iliustr. ISBN 9955-605-17-0
- Mistras: keturių veiksmų drama. Vilnius: Tyto alba, 2010. 142 p.: iliustr. ISBN 978-9986-16-794-5

== Awards ==
- 2018: Lithuanian National Prize for Culture and Arts
- 2014: Medal of the Order for Merits to Lithuania
- 2004: Institute of Lithuanian Literature and Folklore Literary Prize
