= Baltieji Lakajai =

Lake in Lithuania

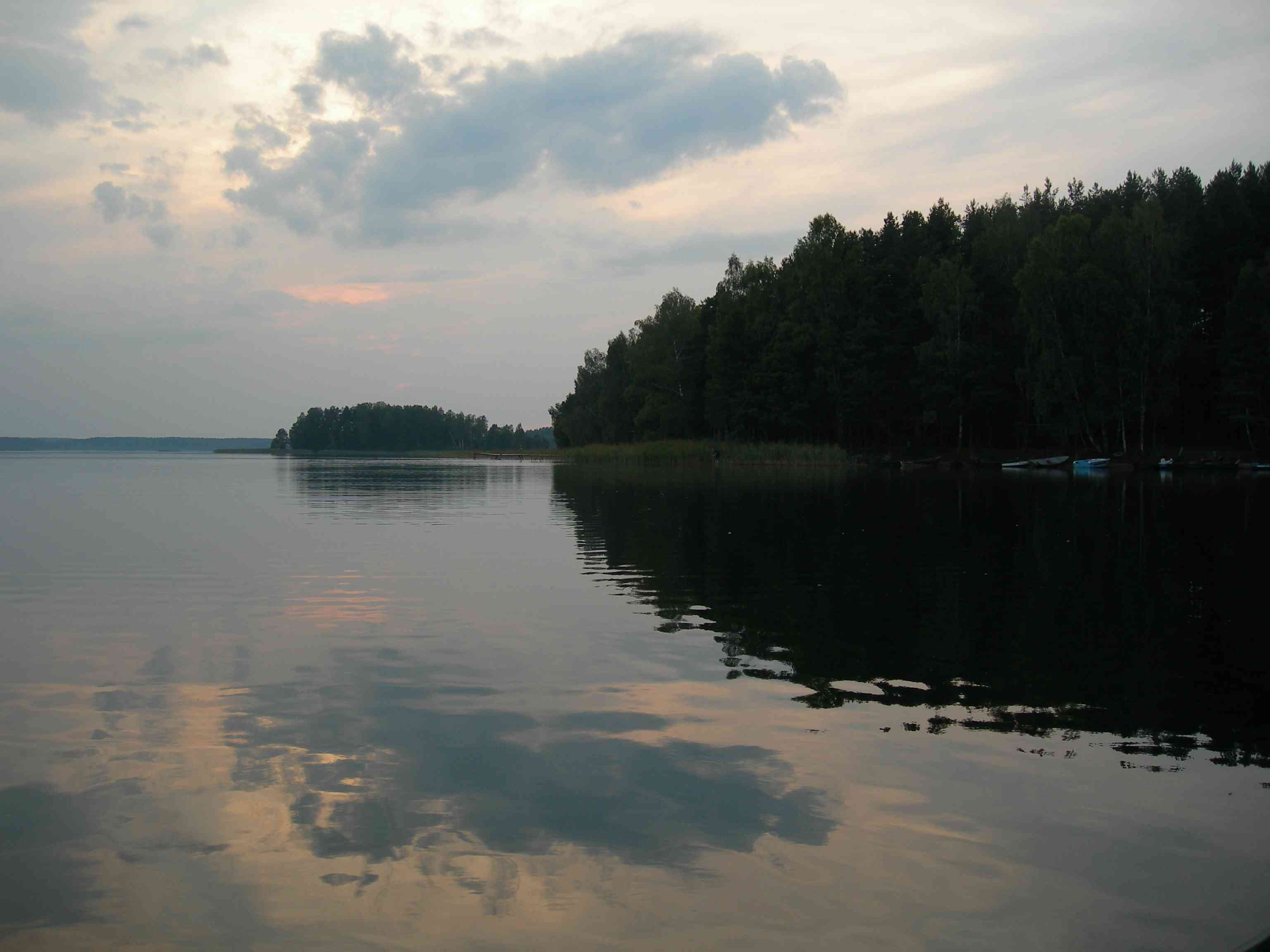

- Location within Lithuania

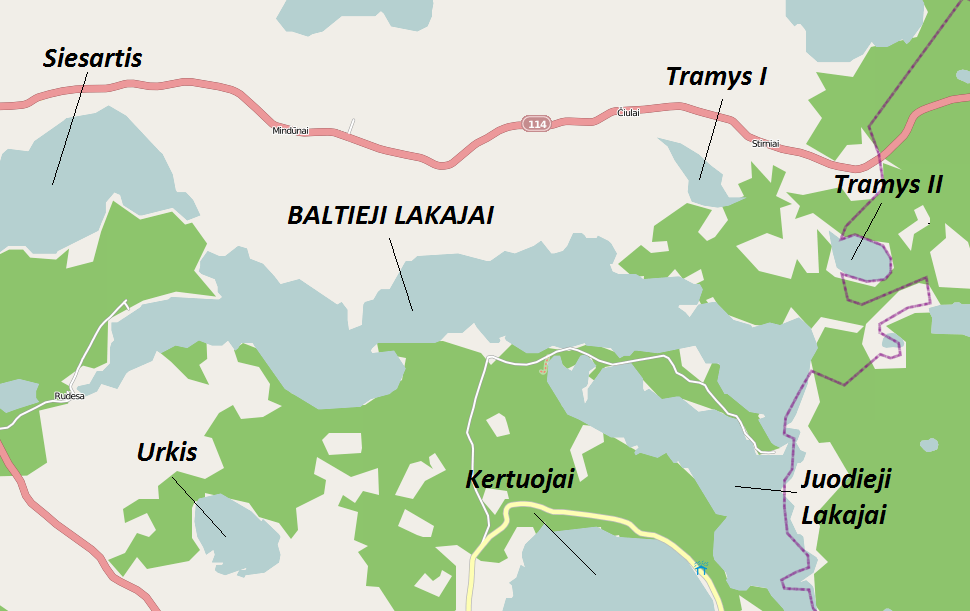
- Coordinates: 55°12′57″N 25°36′29″E
- Basin countries: Lithuania
- Max. length: 8.6 km (5.3 mi)
- Max. width: 1.3 km (0.81 mi)
- Surface area: 7 km^{2} (2.7 sq mi)
- Max. depth: 45 m (148 ft)
- Shore length^{1}: 24.5 km (15.2 mi)
- Islands: 3
- ^{1} Shore length is not a well-defined measure.

Baltieji Lakajai (meaning White Lakajai) is a major lake of eastern Lithuania, located about 12 miles east of Moletai, in Labanoras Regional Park of Utena County. It is part of the Neris River basin, an elongated lake in a west–east direction. The lake is of glacial original, as are all of the approximately 9,000 natural lakes which cover 1.5% of the land area of Lithuania.

The Baltieji Lakajai is part of Labanoras Regional Park that was established in 1992.

== Description ==
Its total area is 6.998 km², its length is 8.6 km and its maximum width is 1.3 km. The lake has three islands which cover an area of 3.8 hectares. Along the waterhole is a 40–50 m deep ravine. The coastline of the lake has a total length of 24.5 km, and has many coves, bays and peninsulas. It is a relatively shallow lake with a maximum depth of 45 metres, narrow, and almost no beaches. Pine forests line the shores in most parts. The smaller Tramys lakes are just to the northeast, to the west is Lake Siesartis, and to the south (from west to east) is Lake Urkis, Lake Kertuojai and Juodieji Lakajai. The lake can be accessed by foot via Highway 114 from the north and Highway 173 from the southwest and is quite popular with vacationers.

== Fish Fauna ==
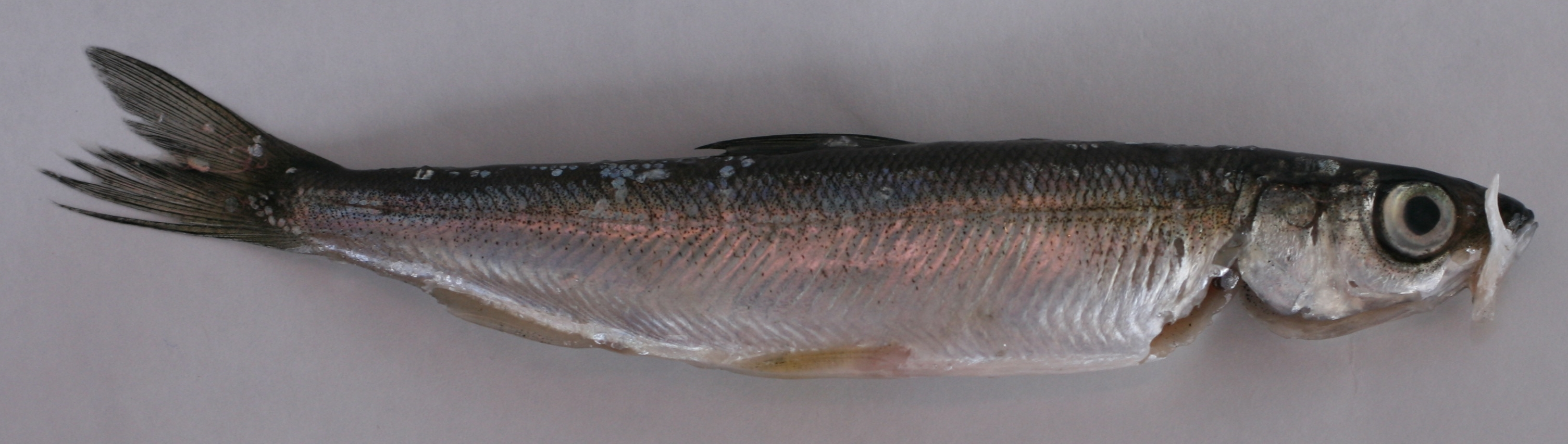
Coregonus albula (Muikku)

The vendace (Coregonus albula) and the smelt (Osmerus eperlanus) are the two species (Vendace is an individual of Coregoninae and smelt of Osmeridae) of cold water fish, which belong to Salmoniformes that are found in abundance in the Baltieji Lakajai, apart from in 74 other large and deep water lakes in Lithuania.

== Recreation ==
Villages around the lake include Rudesa, Kamužė, Grūsis, Ažuraisčiai, Antalakaja, Apkartai, Ščiurys, Palakajys, and Mateliai. The lake has population of perch, roach, pike and bream and there are also eels and crayfish. A permit for angling on the lake is required from the Lithuanian Environmental Protection Agency. The lake is also popular with divers. Water tourism and recreational infrastructure have been created in the lake area.
