= Labanoras Forest =

Forest in Lithuania

Labanoras Forest Lithuanian: Labanoro giria Labanoro–Pabradės giria
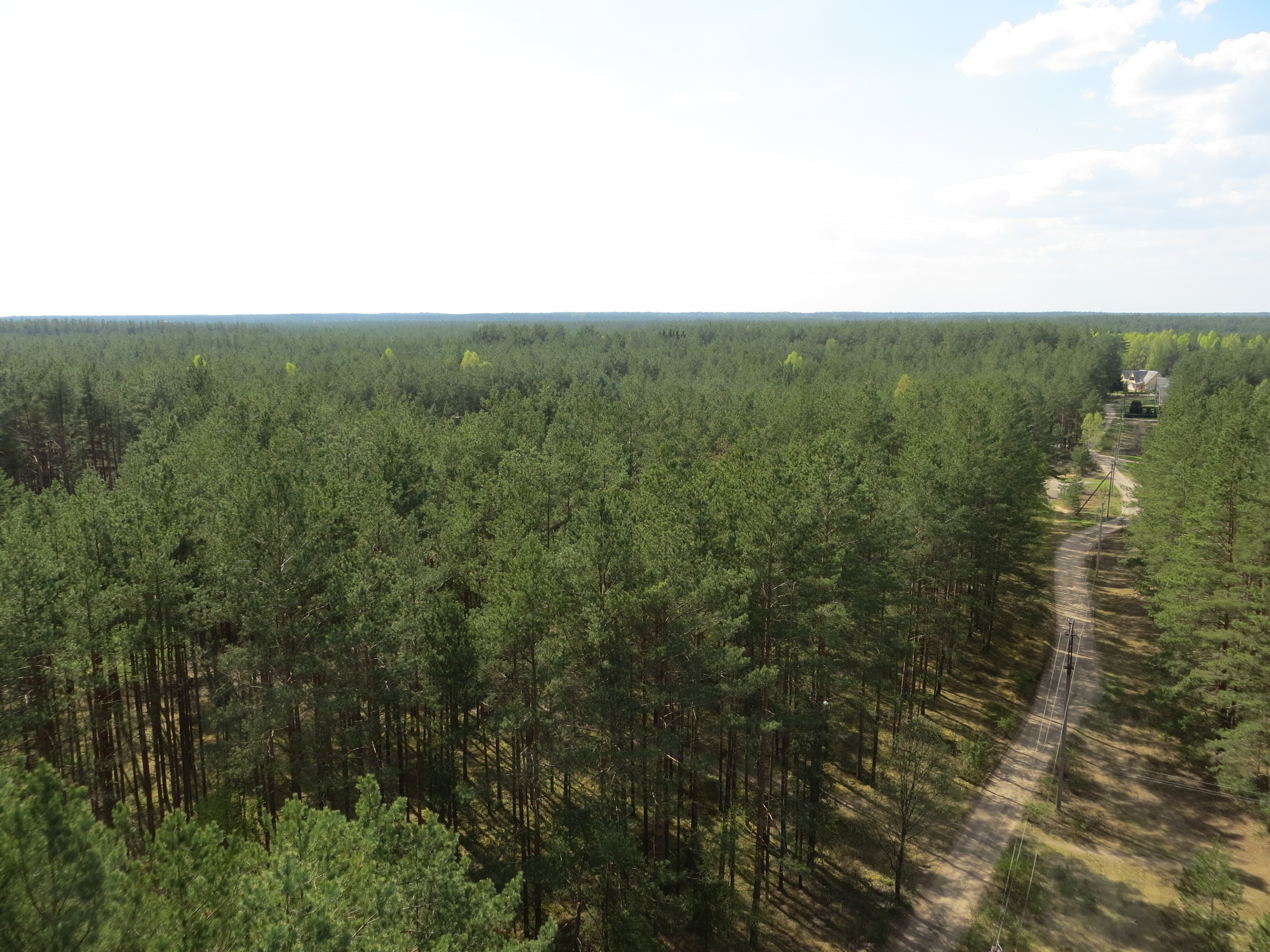
- Labanoras Forest near Švenčionėliai

- Location within Lithuania
- Interactive map of Labanoras Forest

Geography
- Location: Utena County - Vilnius County, Lithuania
- Coordinates: 55°14′N 25°42′E
- Area: 915 km^{2} (353 sq mi)

Ecology
- Forest cover: pine (c. 83%), birch (9%), spruce (6%), black alder (1%)
- Fauna: roe deer, red fox, grey wolf, lynx

Labanoras Forest (Lithuanian: Labanoro giria) also the Labanoras–Pabradė Forest (Lithuanian: Labanoro–Pabradės giria), is the second-largest forest in Lithuania. It as a primeval forest in Aukštaitija region in northeastern Lithuania with the total area of 915 km^{2} (353 sq mi) of which 738 km^{2} (285 sq mi) is covered by trees. A large part of the forest is protected by the Labanoras Regional Park and the Aukštaitija National Park.

The Labanoras Forest mainly consists of pine trees. There are some birch, spruce, black alder groves. Soils are sandy, light, densely covered by cup lichen. The forest is rich in edible mushrooms, bilberries, cranberries, and cowberries. Collection of these mushrooms and berries are an important part of the local economy. The fauna includes many endangered species, such as the gray wolf, wood grouse, black grouse, hoopoe, Eurasian eagle-owl, osprey, mountain hare, stoat, Coronella austriaca and great capricorn beetle.
