= Joniškis, Molėtai =

Joniškis
- Town
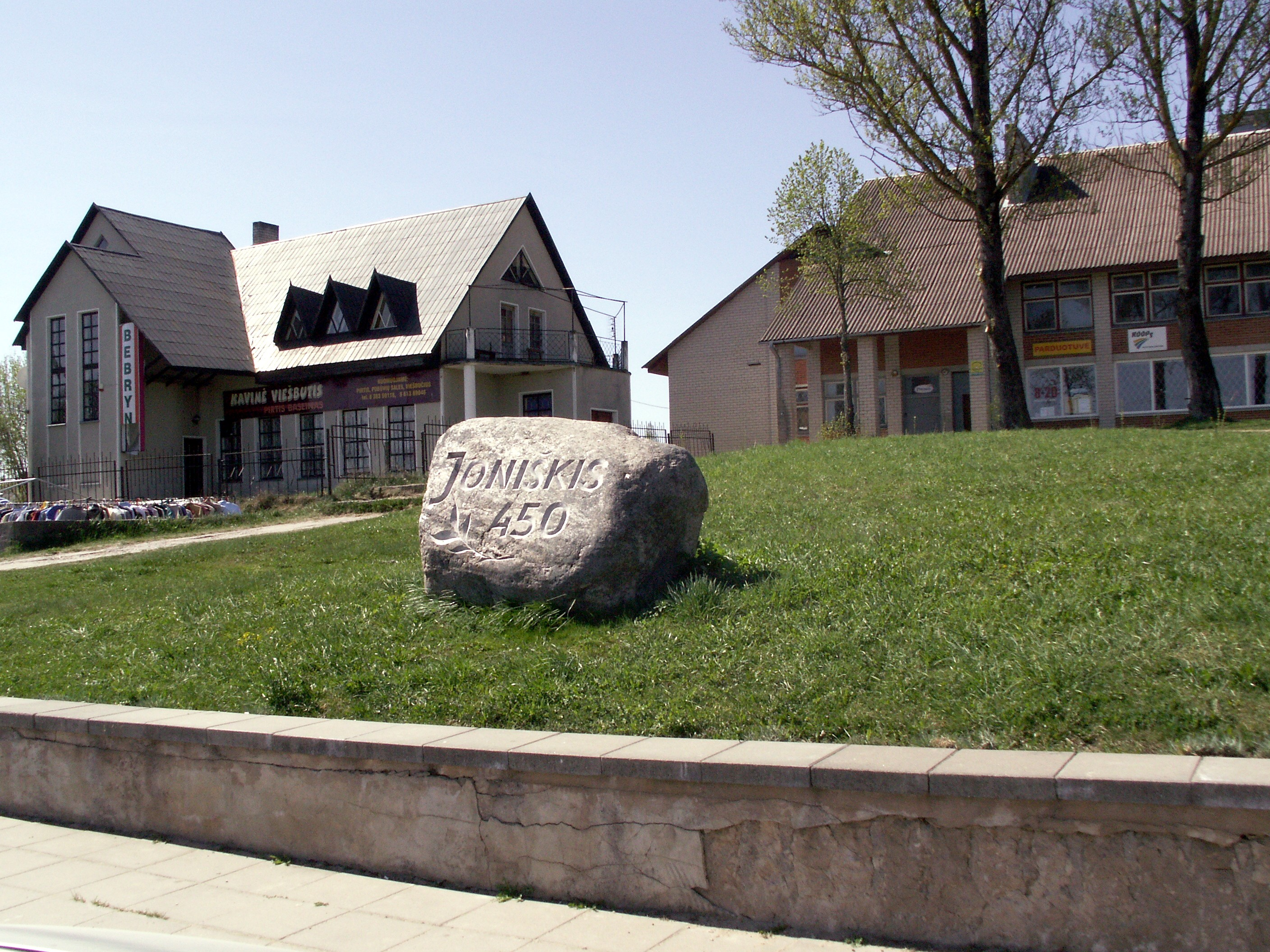

- Location within Lithuania
- Coordinates: 55°4′1″N 25°39′29″E
- Country: Lithuania
- County: Utena County
- Municipality: Molėtai District Municipality
- Eldership: Joniškis eldership

Population (2011)
  - Total: 258
- Time zone: UTC+2 (EET)
  - Summer (DST): UTC+3 (EEST)

Joniškis (Polish: Janiszki) is a small town in Utena County, Lithuania. According to the 2011 census, the town has a population of 258 people.

== History ==
During the period when Lithuania was independent (1918–1940), there were about 200 local inhabitants, the majority of whom were Poles and Jews.

In June 1941, the German army occupied Joniškis. More than 120 local Jews from the village were shot in pits near Lake Arinas. Men and women were first gathered in a barn and then separated before the shooting. In one of the mass graves, near the cemetery, about 60 men were executed. In the other one, right on the bank of Arinas, 85 female and children corpses were found. Jewish shops and houses were looted by the shooters right after the execution.
