= Labanoras Regional Park =

- IUCN category V (protected landscape/seascape)
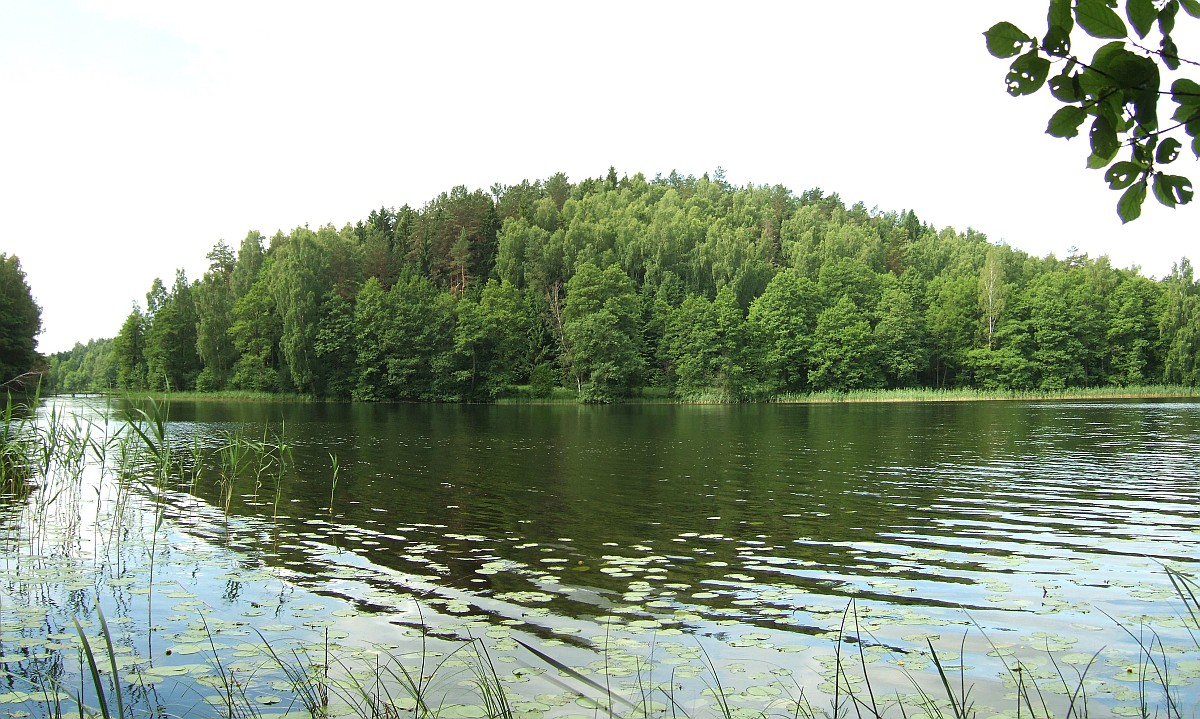

- Location within Lithuania
- Location: Lithuania
- Coordinates: 55°14′N 25°42′E
- Area: 553.18 km^{2} (213.58 sq mi)
- Established: 1992

Labanoras Regional Park, established in 1992, is located 80 kilometers northeast of Lithuania's capital, Vilnius. Covering 553.18 km^{2}, it is the largest regional park in the country. Its administration is in the small town of Labanoras.

== Nature ==
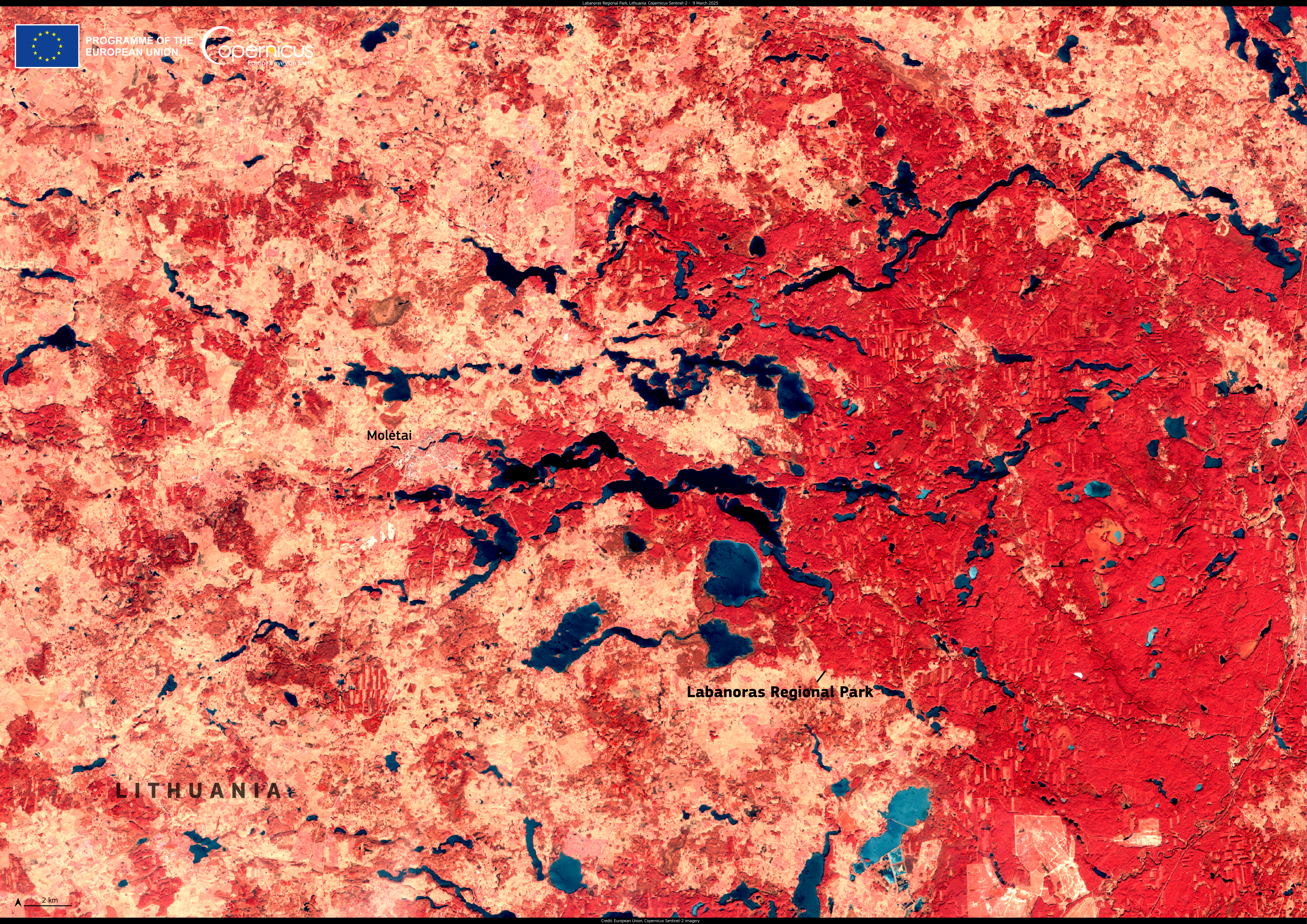
Copernicus Sentinel-2 image of Labanoras Regional Park from space. In this false-colour visualisation, healthy vegetation appears in red, while freshwater bodies stand out in deep black and blue.

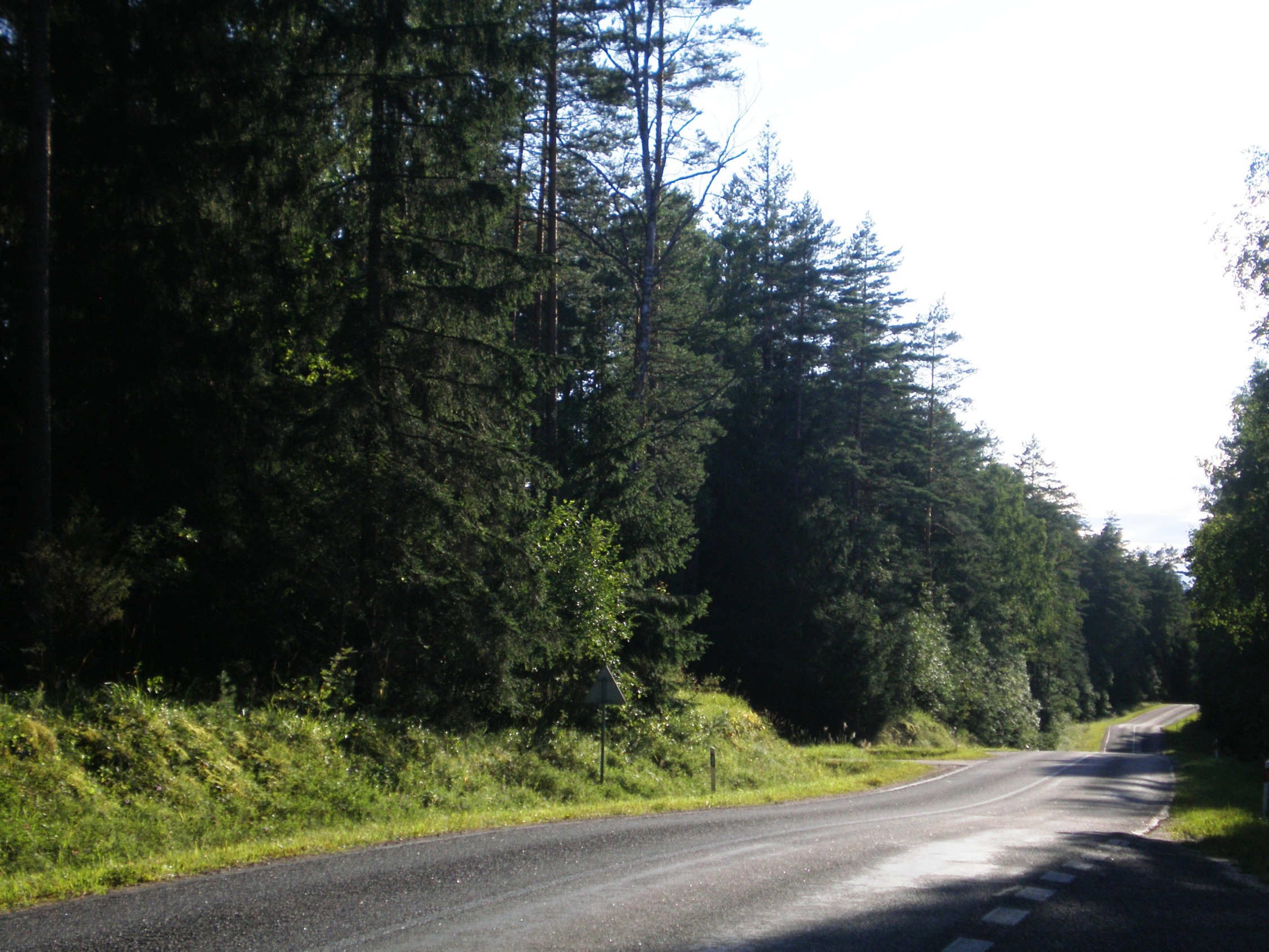
Labanoras Forest east of Labanoras

The park contains about 70 lakes; about 80% of its land is forested. Its floral biodiversity is high, and it is home to the densest population of nesting white stork couples in Europe. It also contains areas with archeological, architectural, ethnographic, and historic value. It is the largest Lithuania regional park, distinguished by a variety of landscapes, extremely rich flora and fauna. The largest part of the park is occupied by forests (80%), mostly pine forests. Labanoras forest with abundant wetlands and lakes is characterized by an abundance of protected species. Lakes occupy 14 percent. park areas. Spectacular Black Lakajai and White Lakajai, Stirniai, Siesartis and other lakes in Molėtai Lake District, 15.8 km long Aisetas lake. Lakaja, one of the most beautiful and exotic rivers, was loved not only by water birds but also by water tourists.

There are 285 lakes in Labanoras Regional Park - the largest of all Lithuanian regional parks. Largest: Stirniai, White Lakajai, Kertuojai. About 30 streams flow through the park. These are Lakaja, Peršokšna, Dumblė, Luknelė. In addition to these water bodies, the park protects swamp ecosystems, valuable calcareous marshes.

A whole complex of high marshes and lakeside low marshes is protected - Kanija raistas and many larger and smaller wetlands. In the Girutiškis Nature Reserve here, the Beržalotas upland swamp shines with the mirrors of the lakes.

Pine forests make up 81 percent. of all the forests in the park. Along with abundant lakes, swamps, hilly and undulating terrain, they are very picturesque.

The distant surroundings of Aukštaitija National Park can be seen from the observation tower of the Lithuanian Museum of Ethnocosmology.

The park is a famous breeding ground for elks, wolves and lynxes.
