= Molėtai =

- City
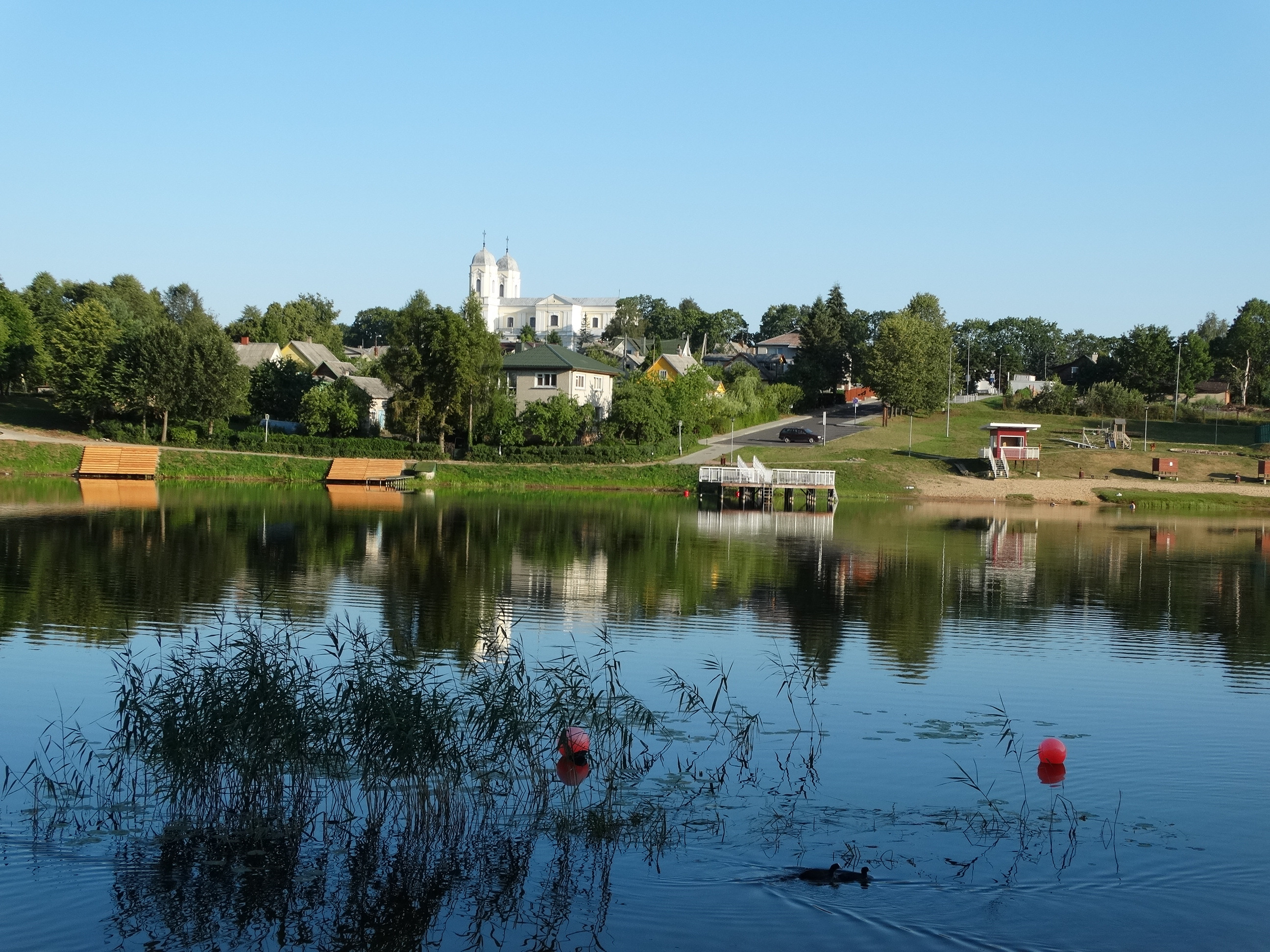

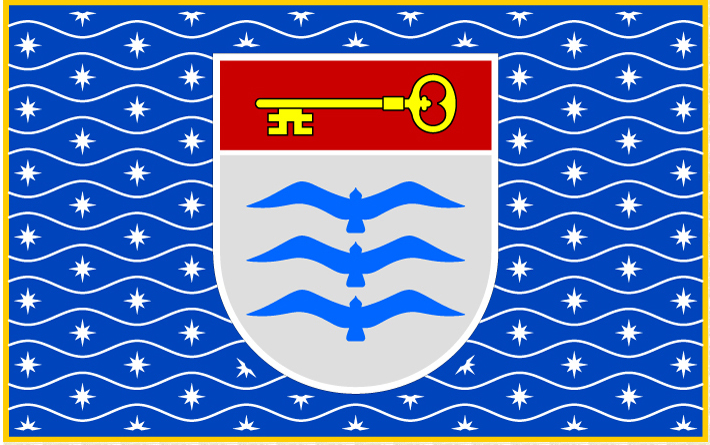
- Flag Coat of arms

- Location of Molėtai
- Coordinates: 55°14′N 25°25′E
- Country: Lithuania
- Ethnographic region: Aukštaitija
- County: Utena County
- Municipality: Molėtai district municipality
- Capital of: Molėtai district municipality
- First mentioned: 1387 Feb. 17
- Granted city rights: 1539

Population (2022)
  - Total: 5,716
- Time zone: UTC+2 (EET)
  - Summer (DST): UTC+3 (EEST)
- Website: moletai.lt

Molėtai (Polish: Malaty; German: Mulau) is a city in north eastern Lithuania surrounded by lakes. One of the oldest settlements in Lithuania, it is a popular resort for the inhabitants of Vilnius. According to the 2013 census, it had 6,302 inhabitants. Known for the famous fisherman’s day. The town is located about 60 km (37 mi) north of Vilnius and 30 km (19 mi) south of Utena.

== History ==
It was first mentioned as a private property of the bishop of Vilnius in year 1387.

On 29 August 1941, 700 to 1,200 Jews were murdered in a mass execution perpetrated by an Einsatzgruppen of Lithuanian "nationalists". The victims of the massacre were commemorated in a march to the site, and a memorial was unveiled there, on the 75th anniversary, in 2016.

== Economy ==
Molėtai hosts a factory of Teltonika, a Lithuanian semiconductor company, which employed 270 people in 2024.

Molėtai Astronomical Observatory, which belongs to Vilnius University, is located near the town. Lithuanian Museum of Ethnocosmology operates next to the observatory.

== Notable residents ==
- Marius Ivaškevičius – Lithuanian screenwriter, journalist and author
- Vaida Genytė – Lithuanian singer
- Leib Gurwicz – British rabbi
- Marius Ivaškevičius – Lithuanian screenwriter, journalist and author
- Rolandas Kazlas – Lithuanian actor and theatre director
- Valentinas Mazuronis – Lithuanian politician

== Gallery ==
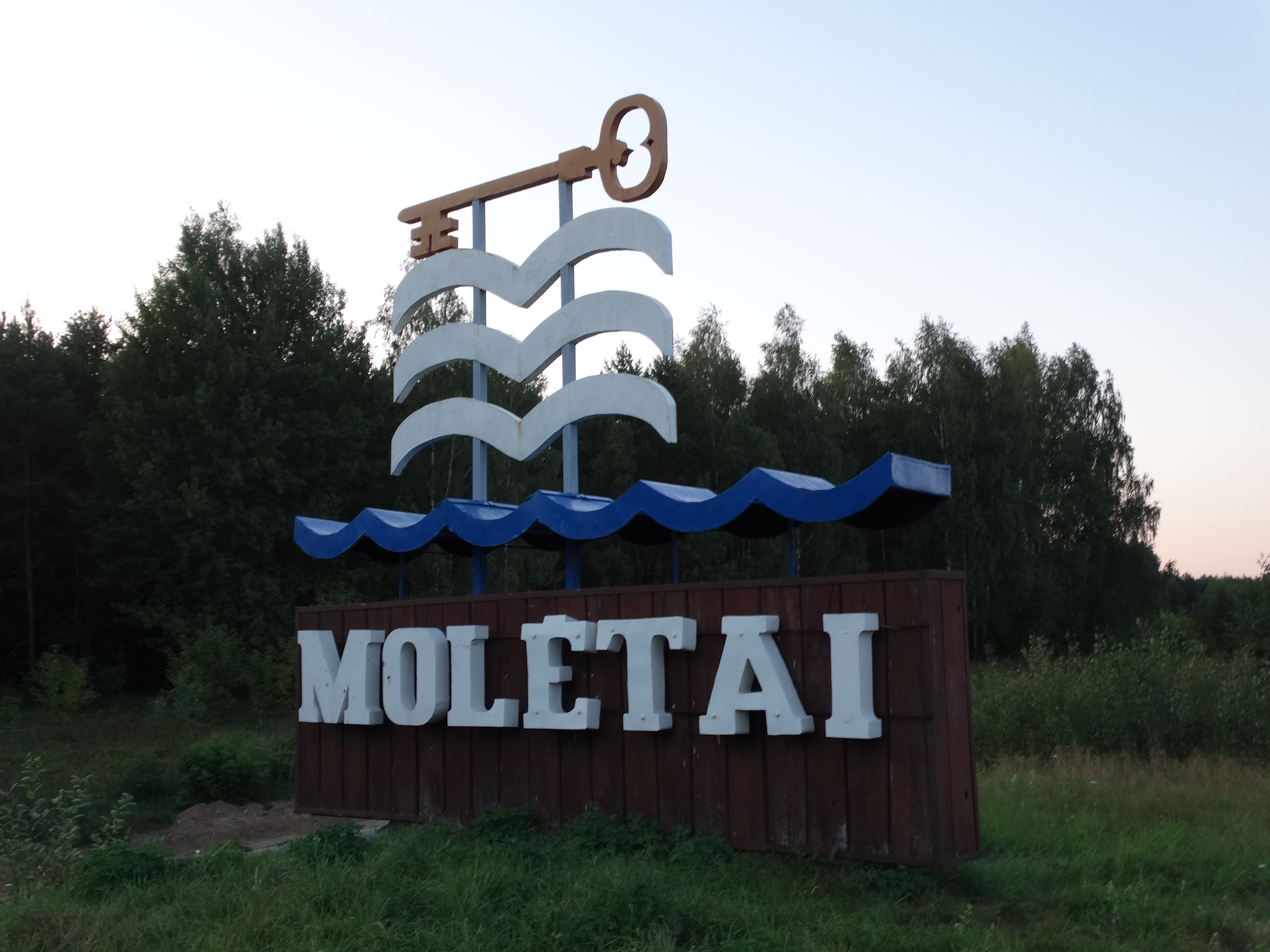
Molėtai sign

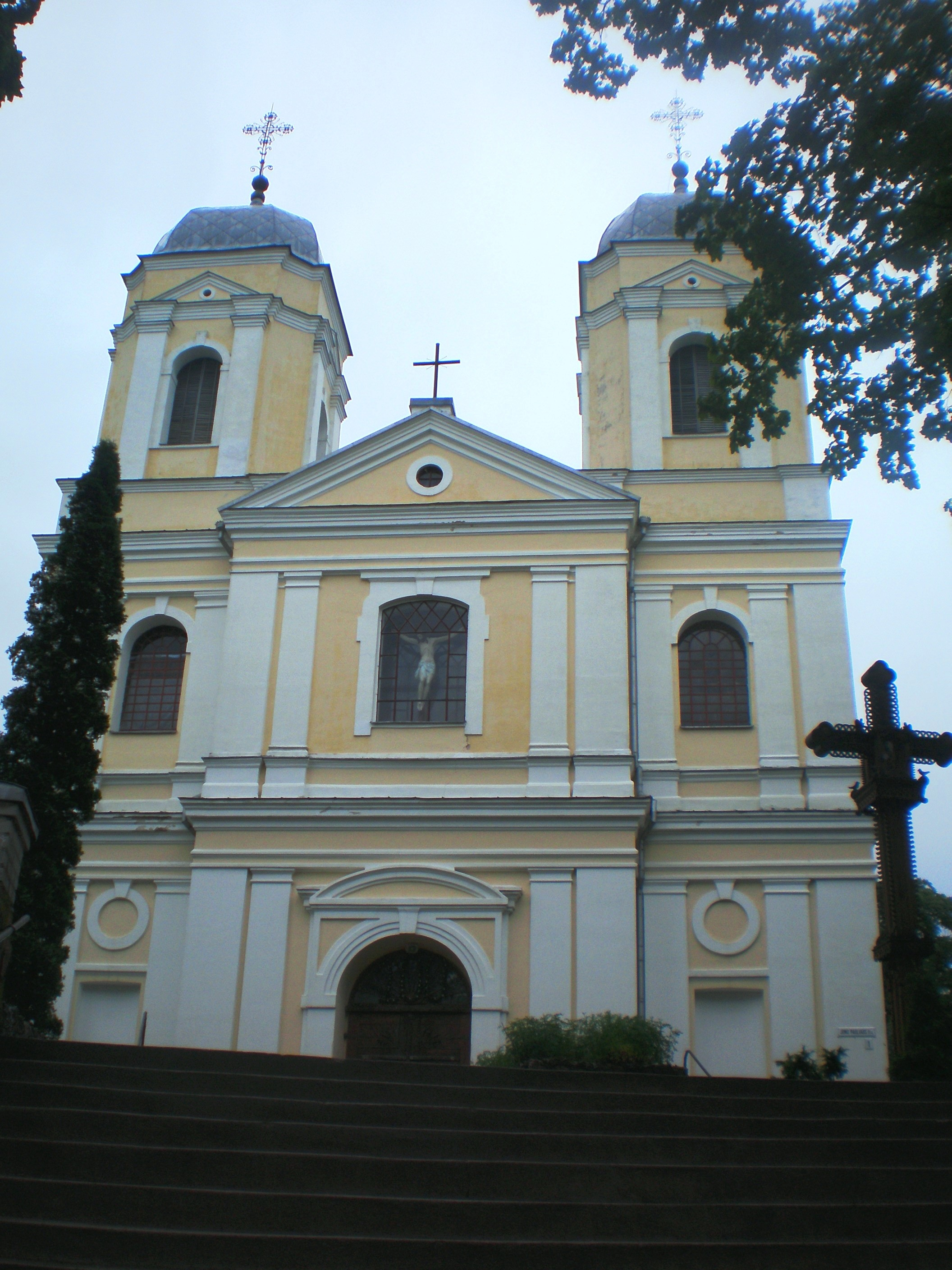
Molėtai Church of St. Peter and St. Paul exterior

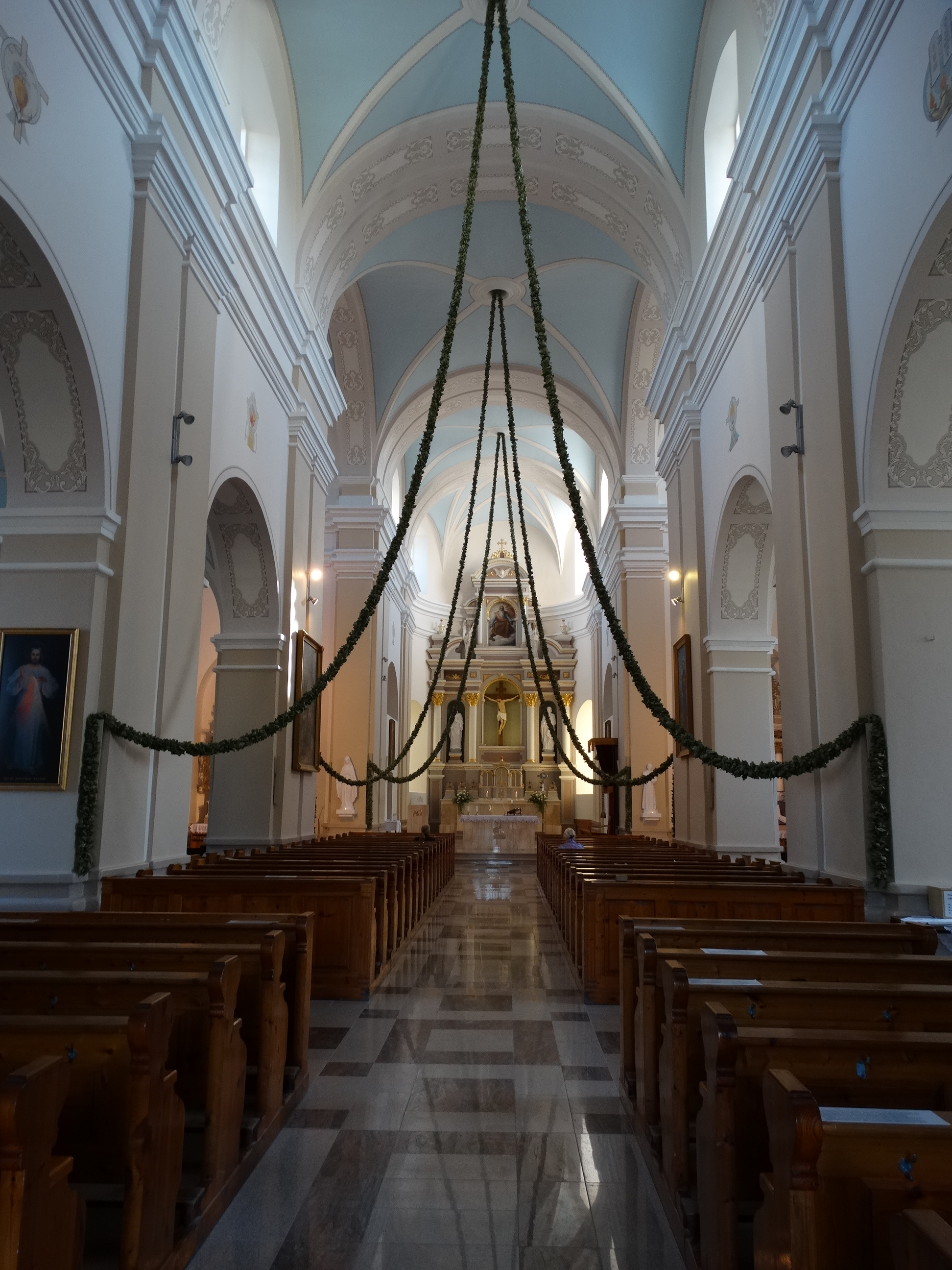
Molėtai Church of St. Peter and St. Paul interior

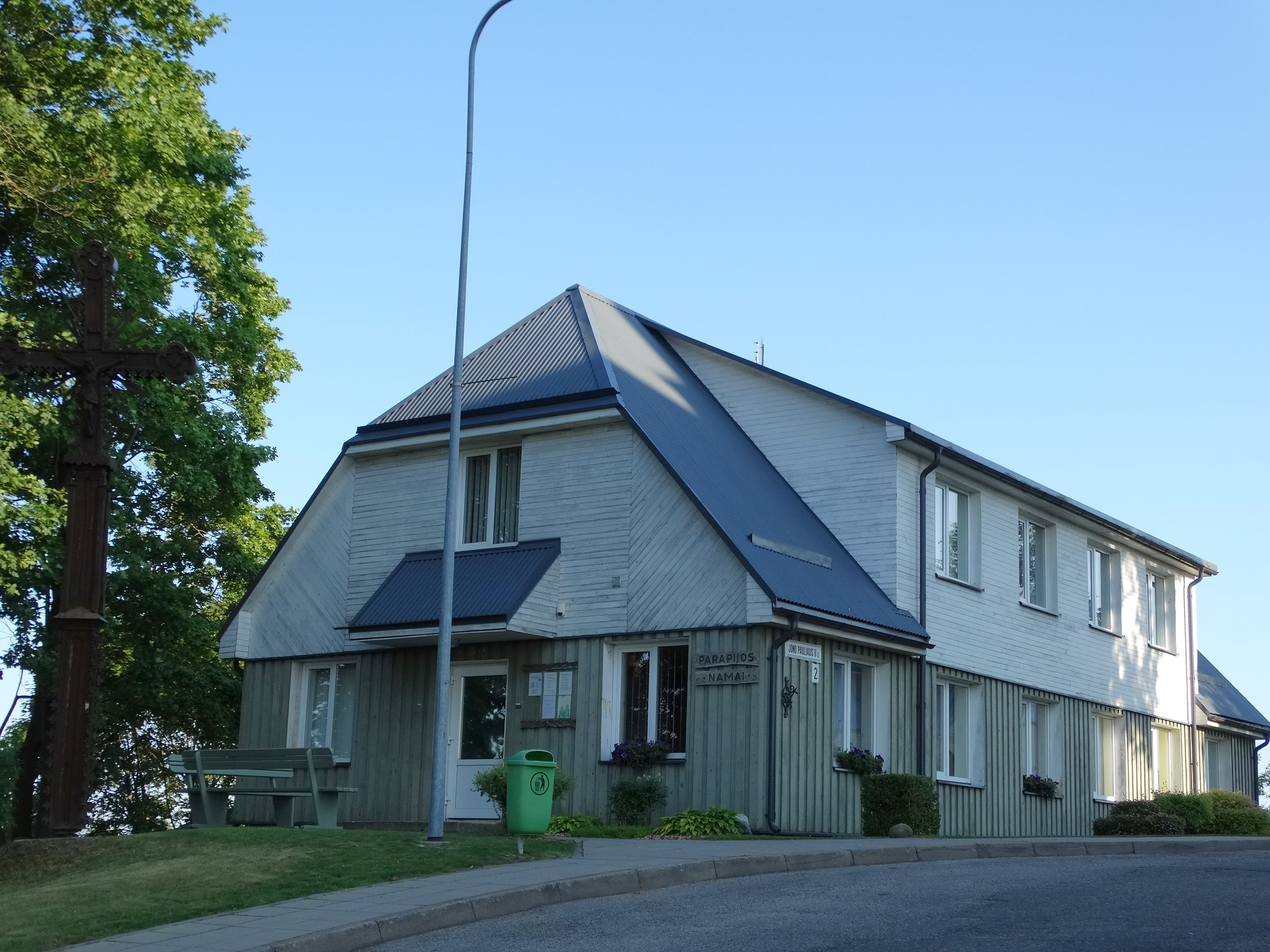
Molėtai Church House

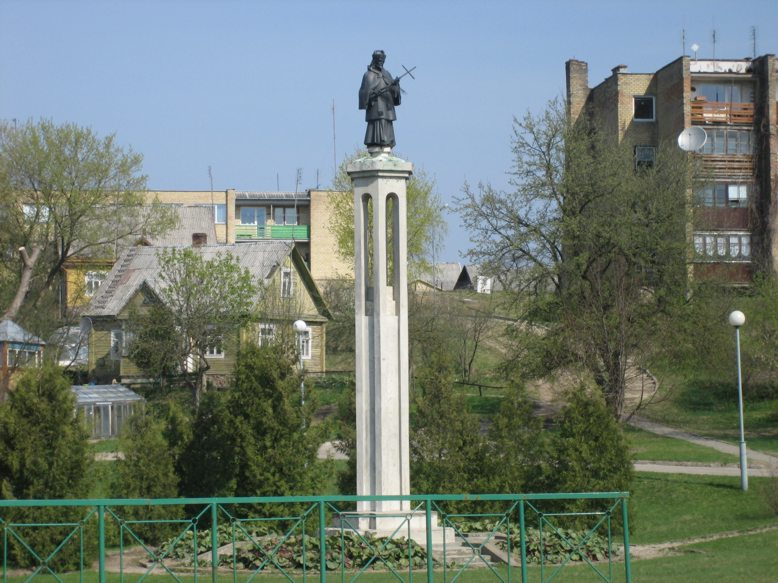
John of Nepomuk sculpture

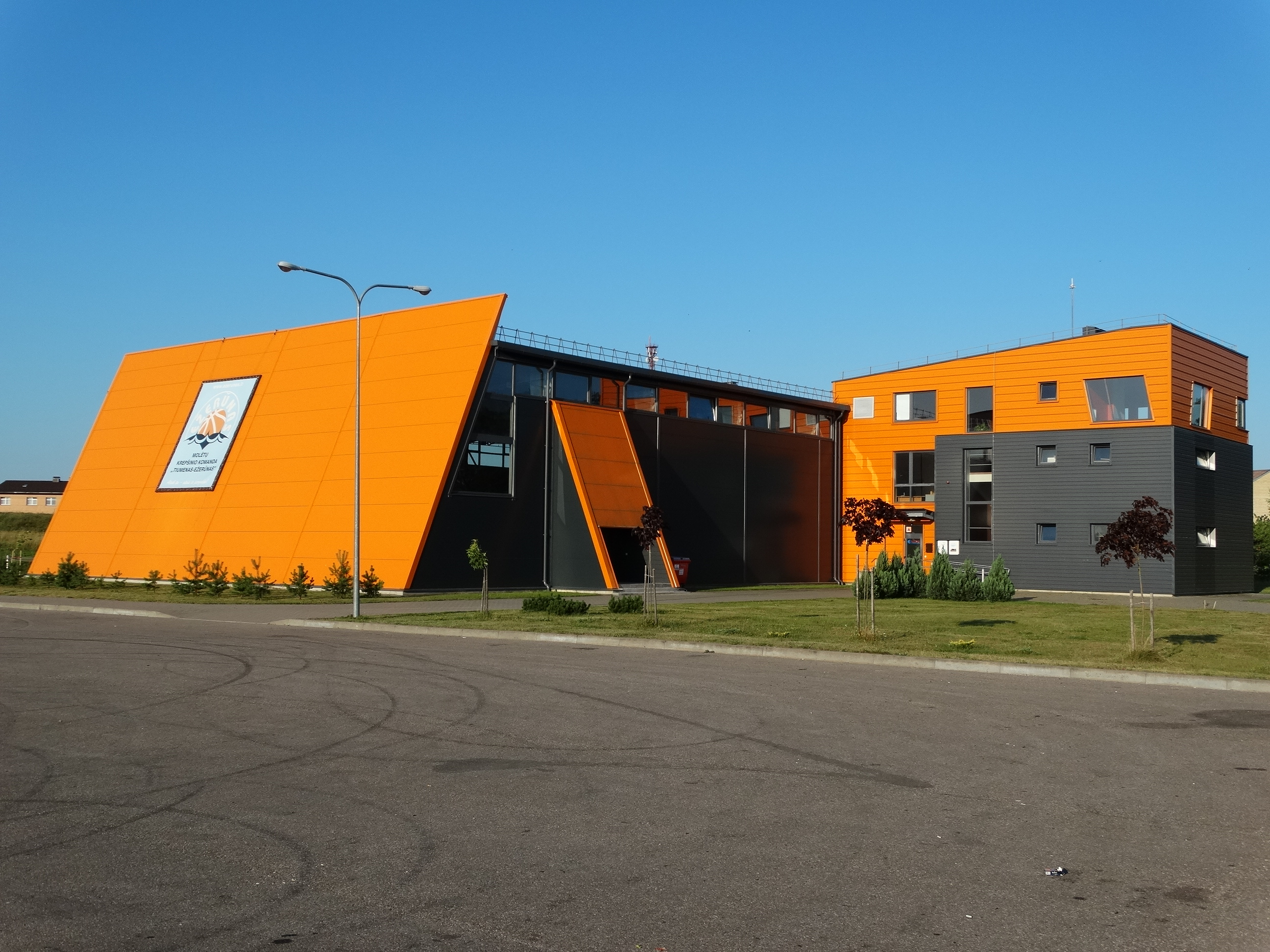
Molėtai Arena

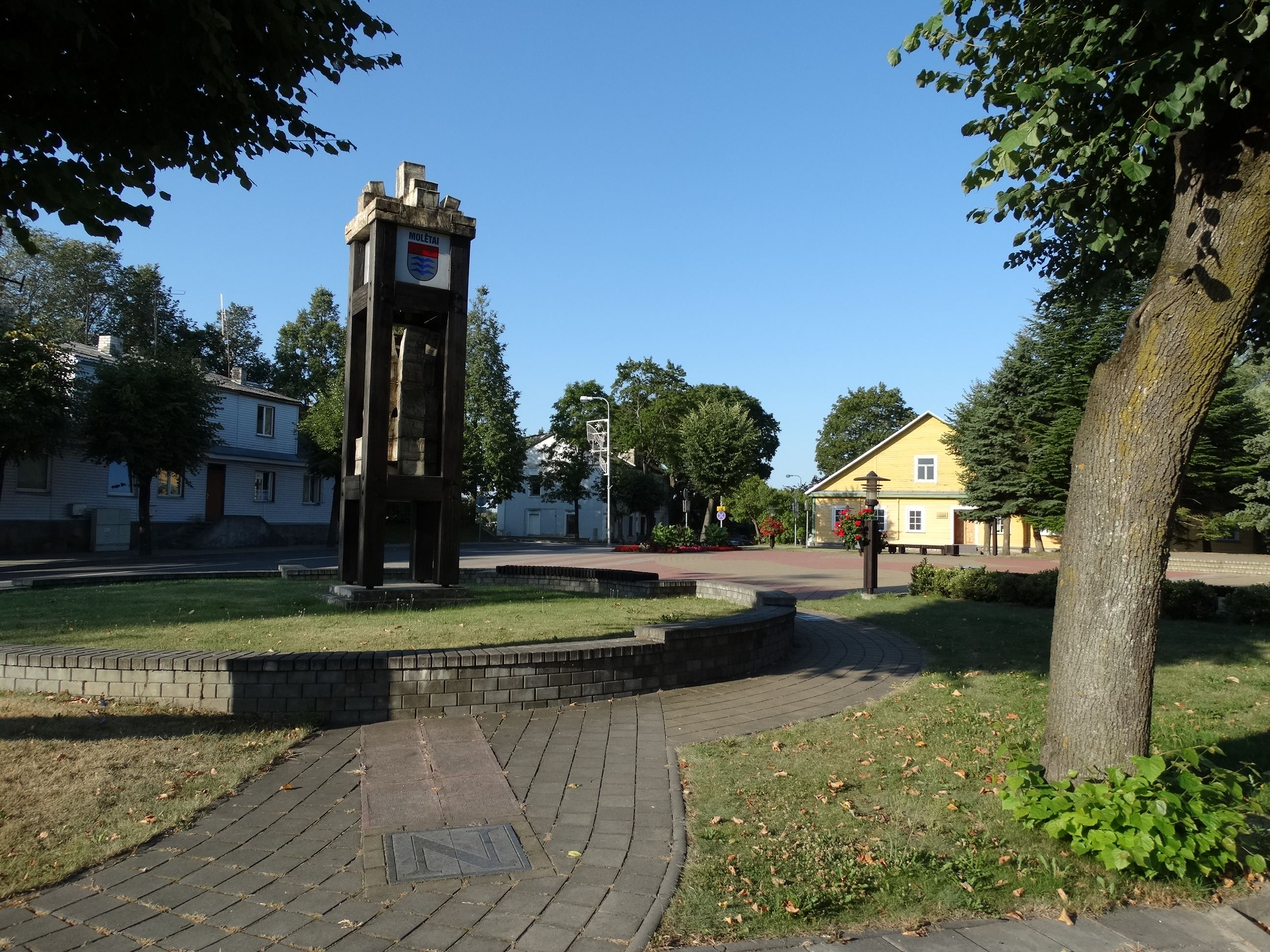
Molėtai Youth Square

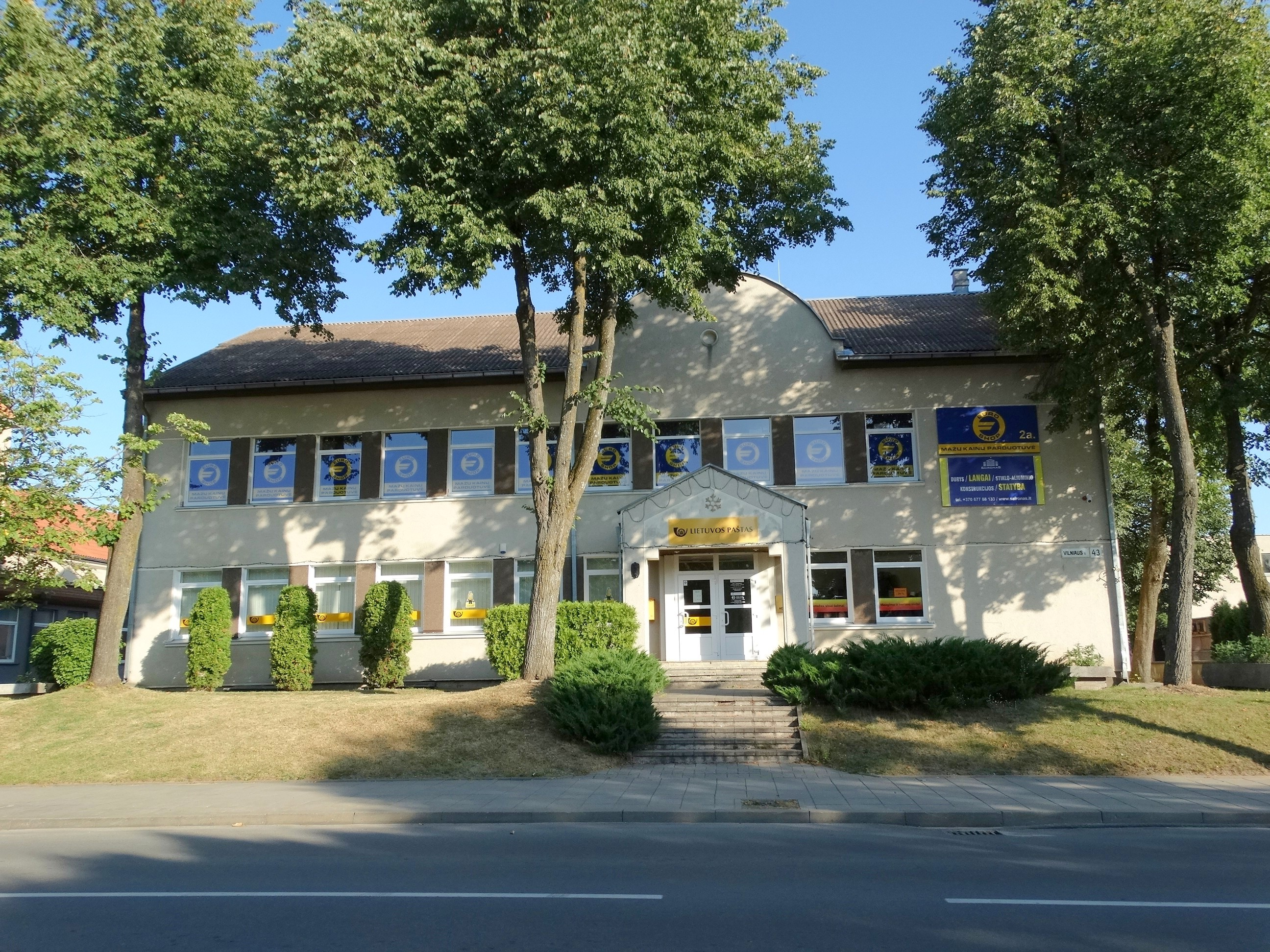
Molėtai post office

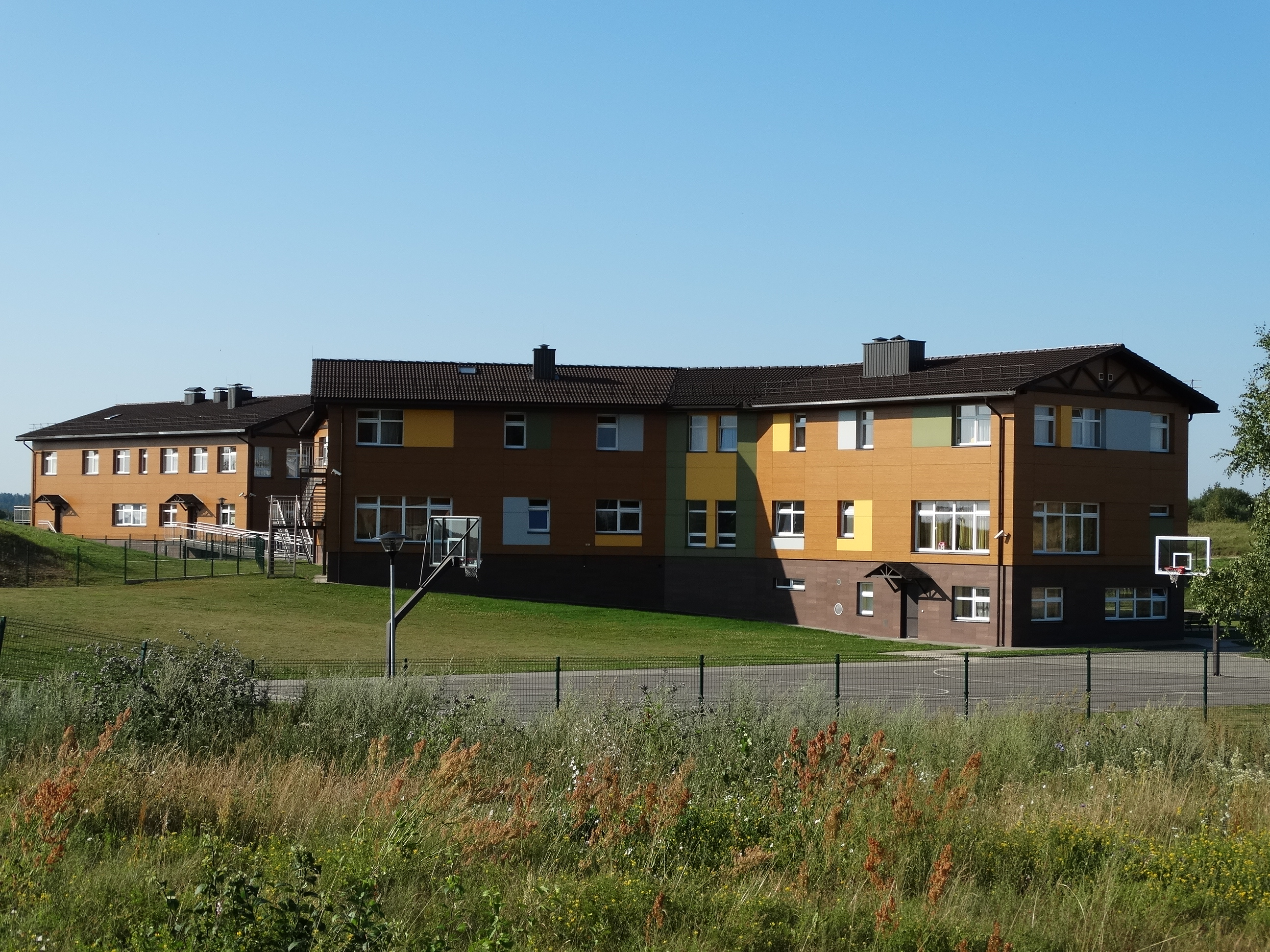
Molėtai Child Care Home

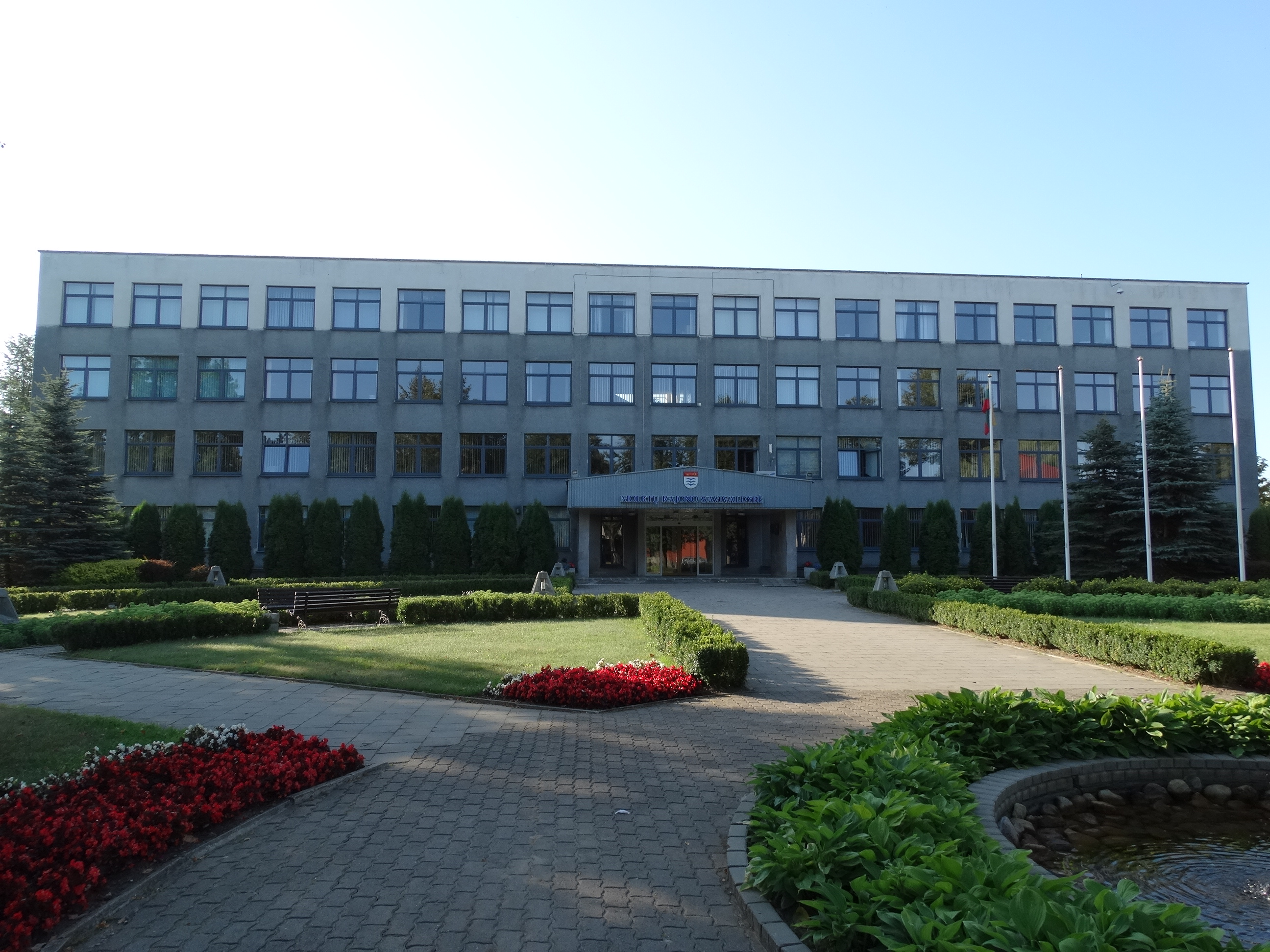
Municipality of Molėtai

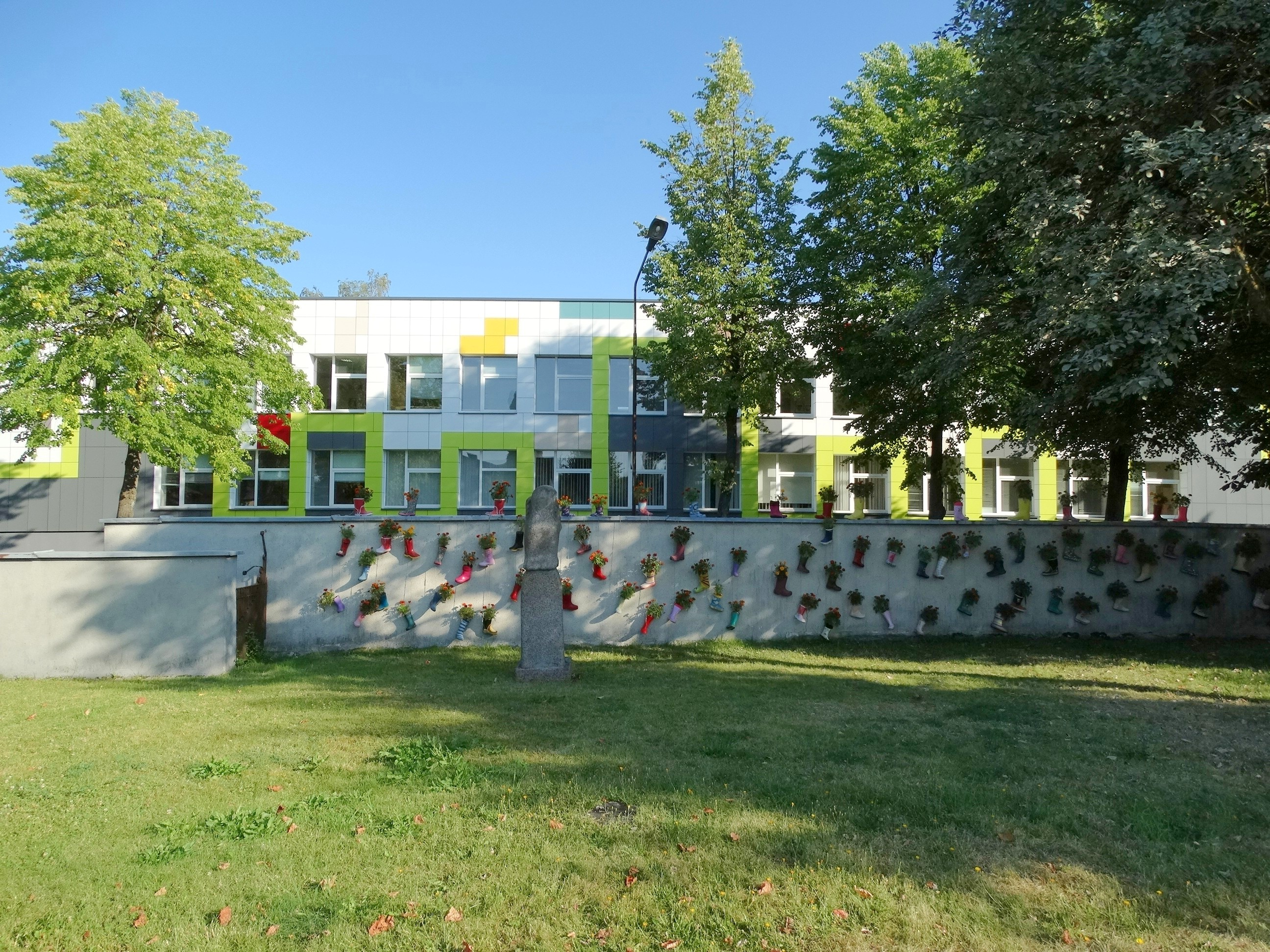
Art School of Molėtai

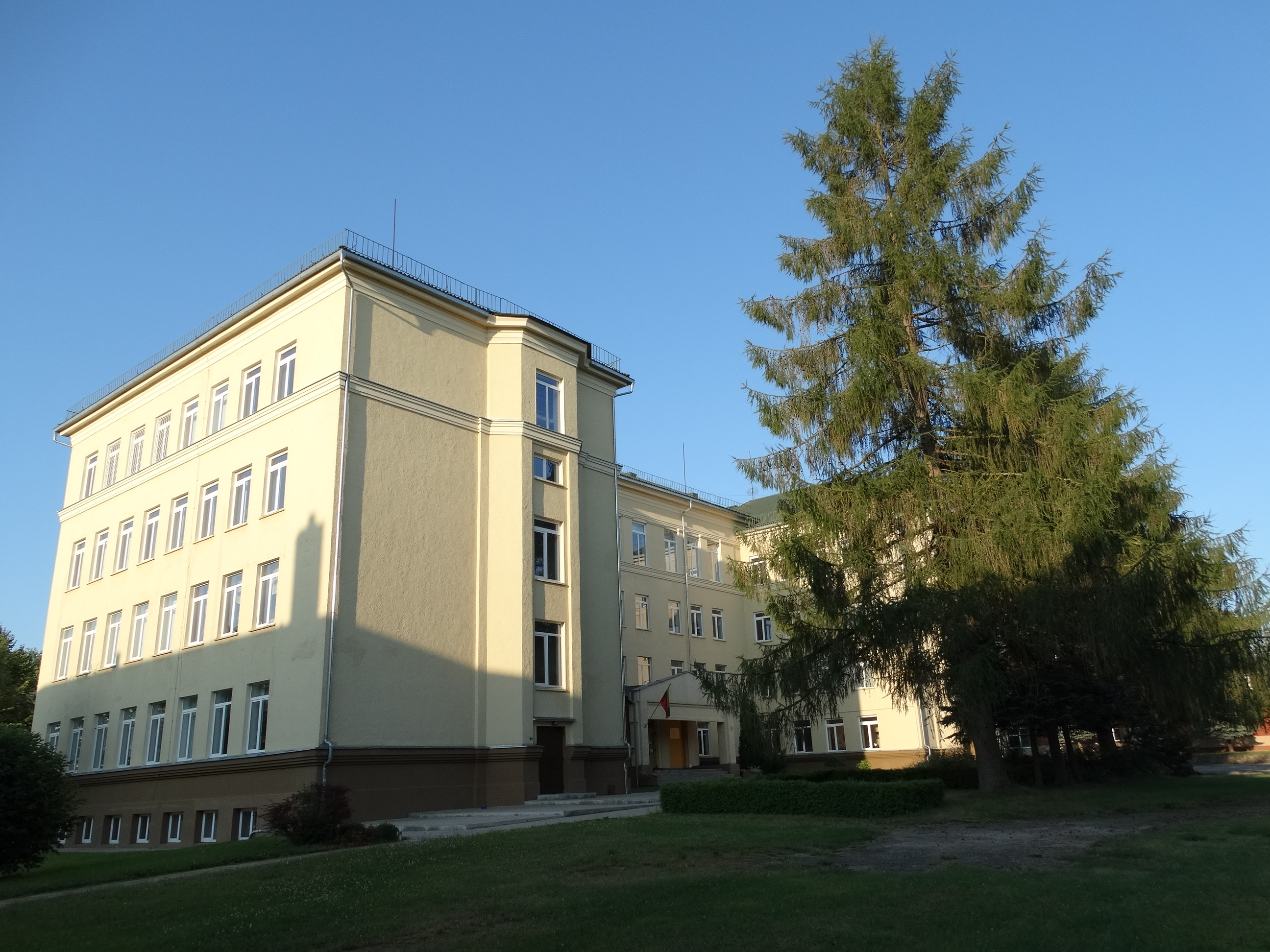
Molėtai Gymnasium

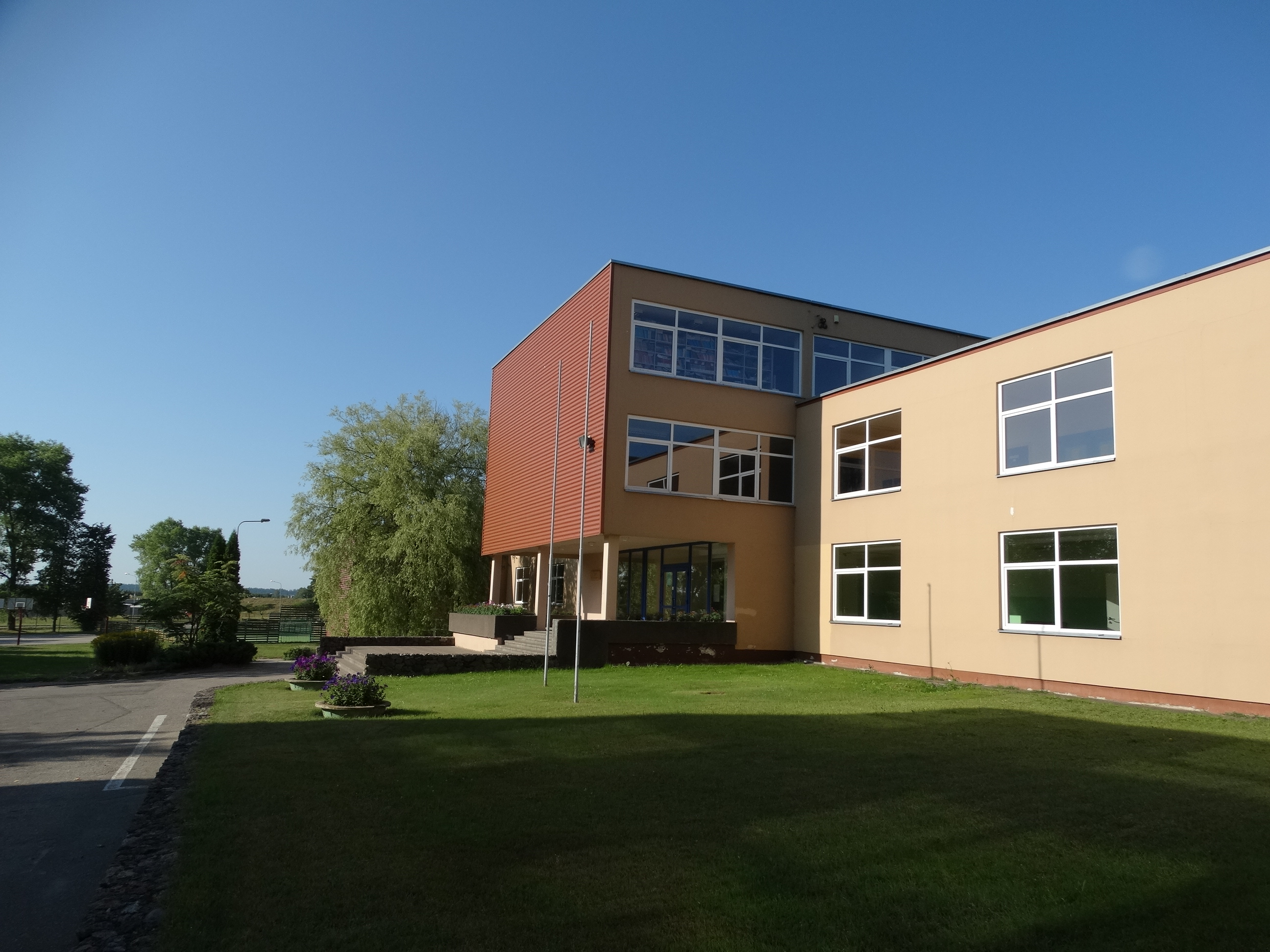
Molėtai Primary School
