= Molėtai District Municipality =

Coordinates: 55°12′43″N 25°22′41″E

Molėtai District Municipality Molėtų rajono savivaldybė
- Municipality
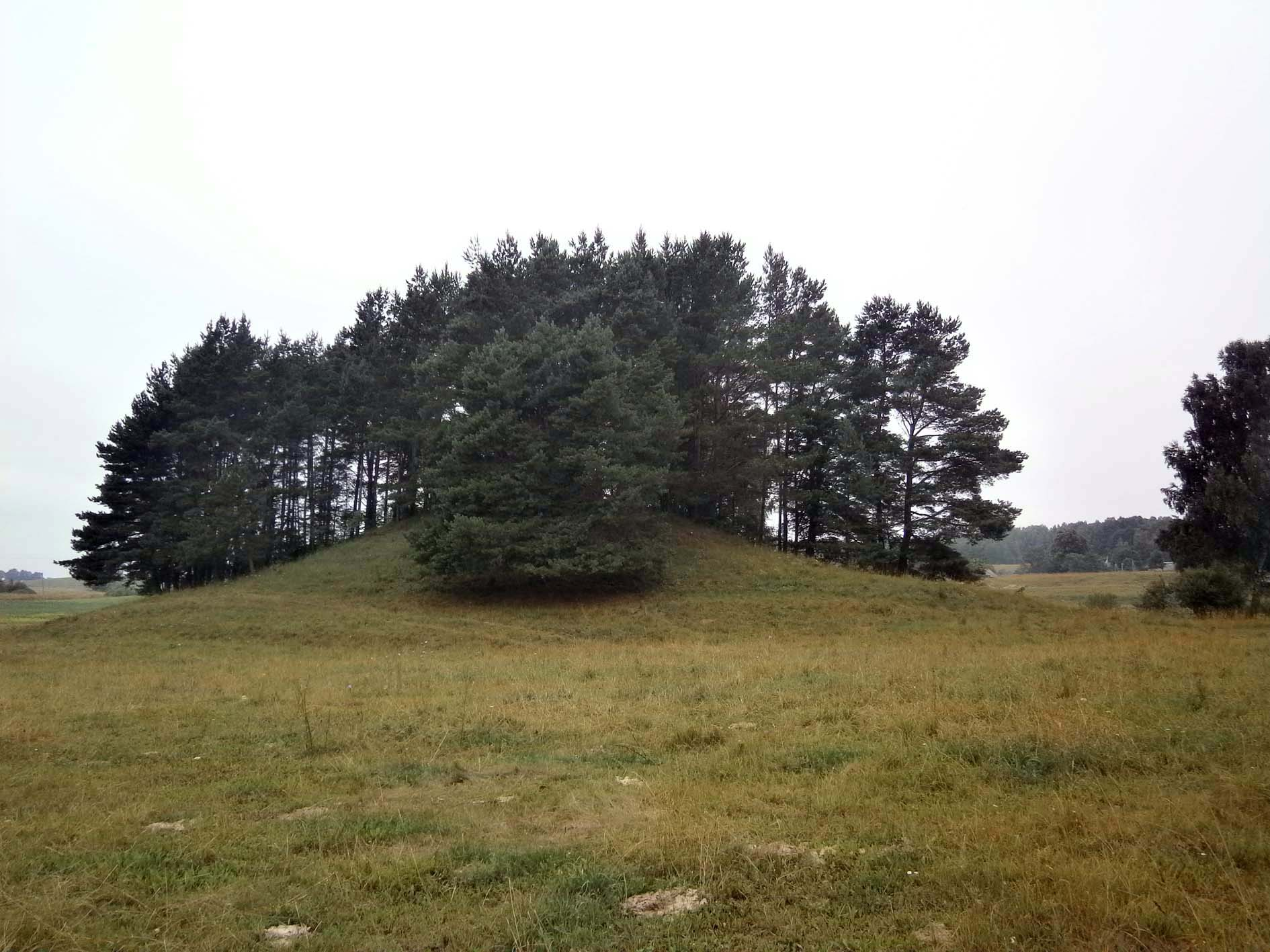
- Svobiškėlis mound

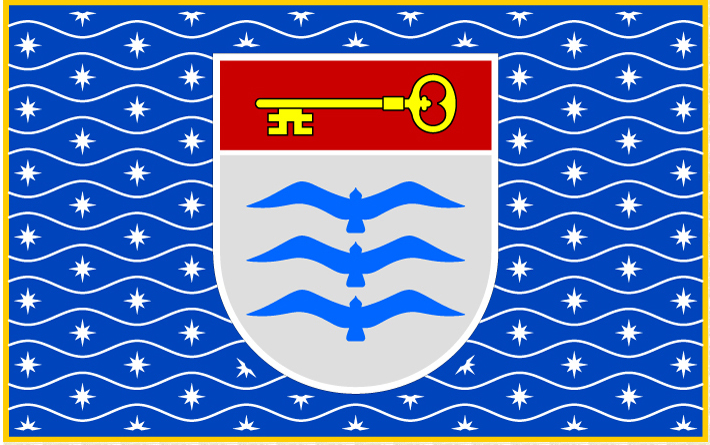
- Flag Coat of arms

- Location of Molėtai district municipality within Lithuania

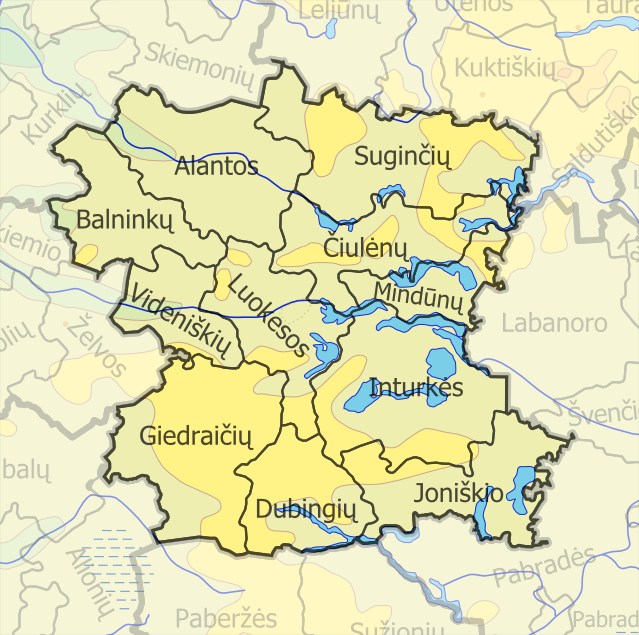
- Map of Molėtai district municipality
- Country: Lithuania
- Ethnographic region: Aukštaitija
- County: Utena County
- Capital: Molėtai
- Elderships: 11

Area
  - Total: 1,368 km^{2} (528 sq mi)
  - Rank: 22nd

Population (2021)
  - Total: 17,222
  - Rank: 48th
  - Density: 12.59/km^{2} (32.61/sq mi)
  - Rank: 56th
- Time zone: UTC+2 (EET)
  - Summer (DST): UTC+3 (EEST)
- Telephone code: 383
- Major settlements: Molėtai (pop. 5,716)
- Website: www.moletai.lt

The Molėtai District Municipality is one of 60 municipalities in Lithuania.

Molėtai is known for its many lakes. There are about 220 lakes in the district and they cover about 7% of the total territory. Since it is only about 60 km north of Vilnius, many Vilnians own summer homes there. The area offers many recreational opportunities. It is easy to reach Molėtai because there is a highway connecting Vilnius and Utena which divides the district into two almost equal parts. Since there is little industry, the district is proud of its lack of pollution. The land is not very fertile, therefore the district's government is focused on developing tourism.

Another natural resource of the district are its forests which cover about 26.6% of its territory.

== Structure ==
District structure:

- 1 city – Molėtai;
- 5 towns – Alanta, Balninkai, Dubingiai, Giedraičiai and Joniškis;
- 928 villages.

Population of largest Molėtai District Municipality settlements (2011):

- Molėtai – 6434
- Giedraičiai – 684
- Naujasodis – 496
- Suginčiai – 426
- Toliejai – 379
- Videniškiai – 368
- Alanta – 348
- Balninkai – 319
- Joniškis – 258
- Inturkė – 237

== Nature and geography ==
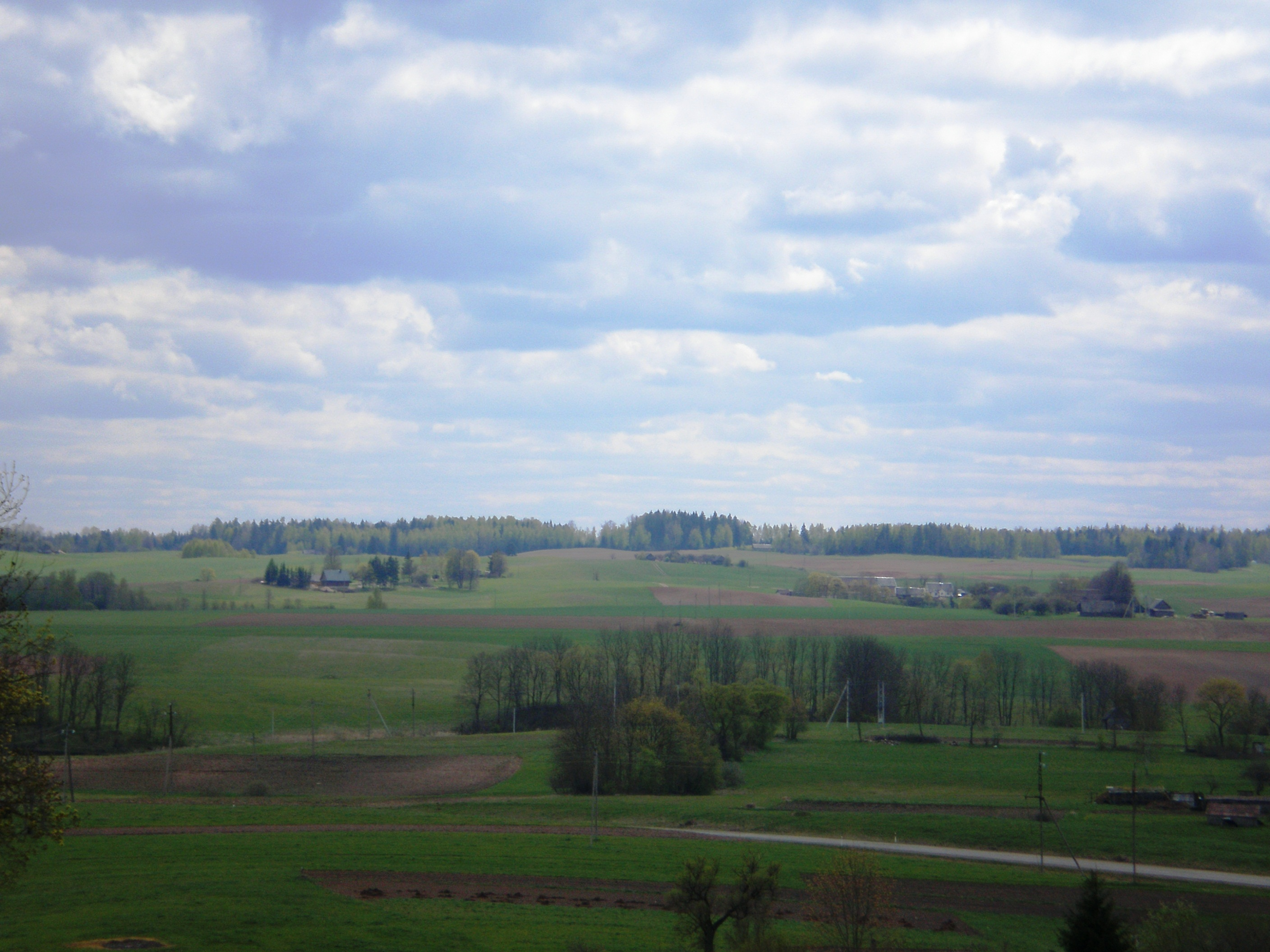
Landscape near Alanta

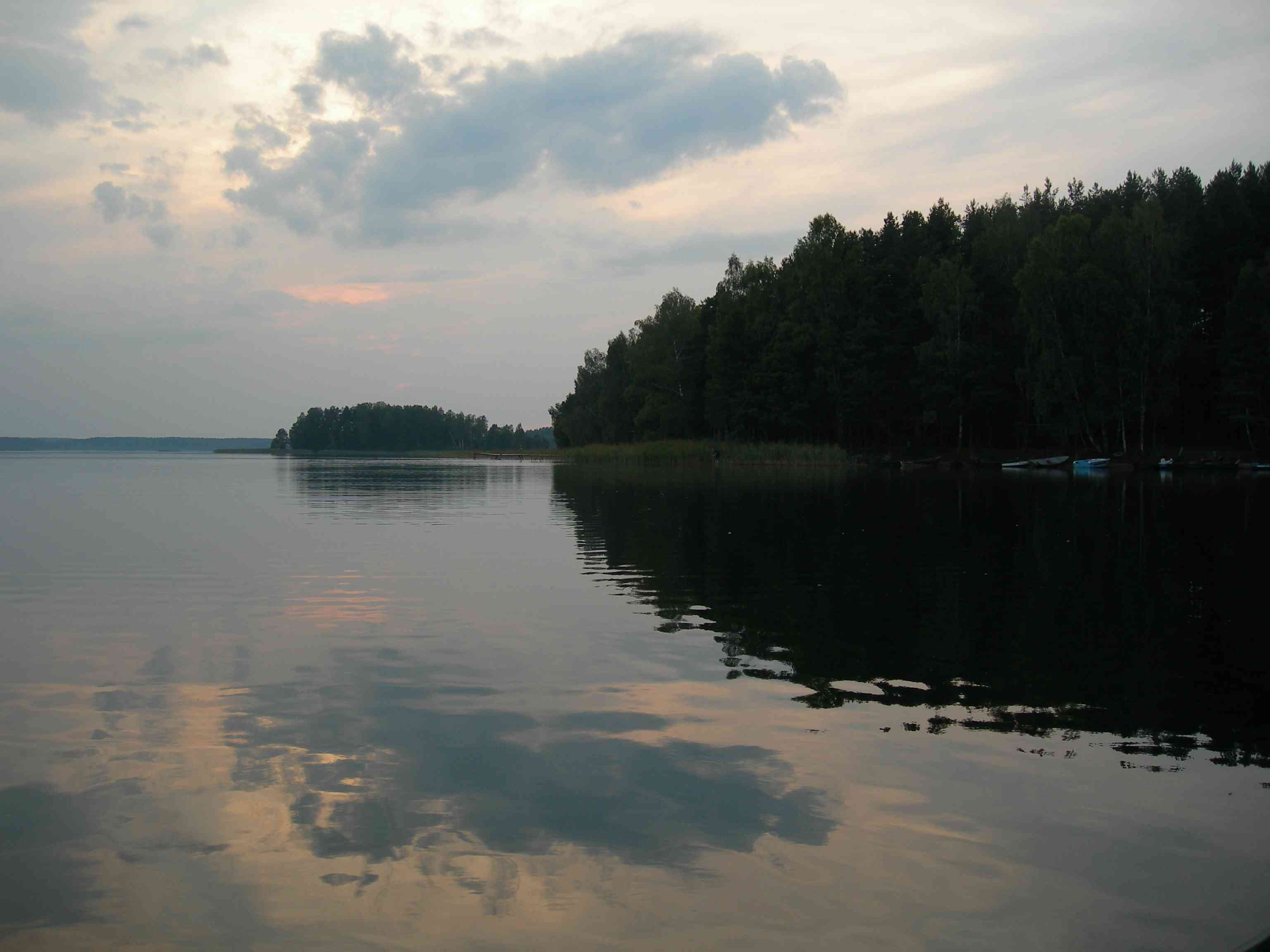
Baltieji Lakajai

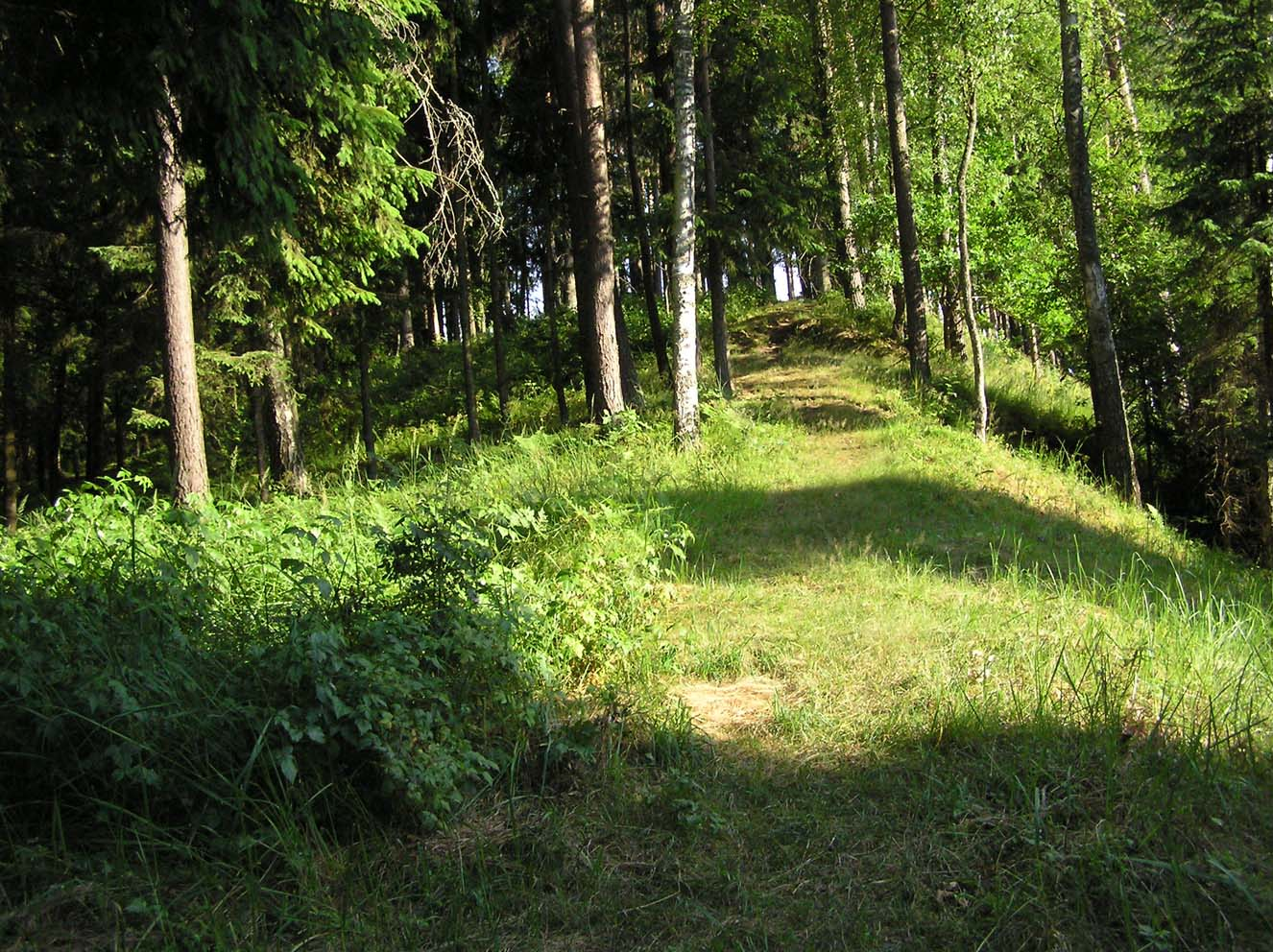
Kertuojis mound

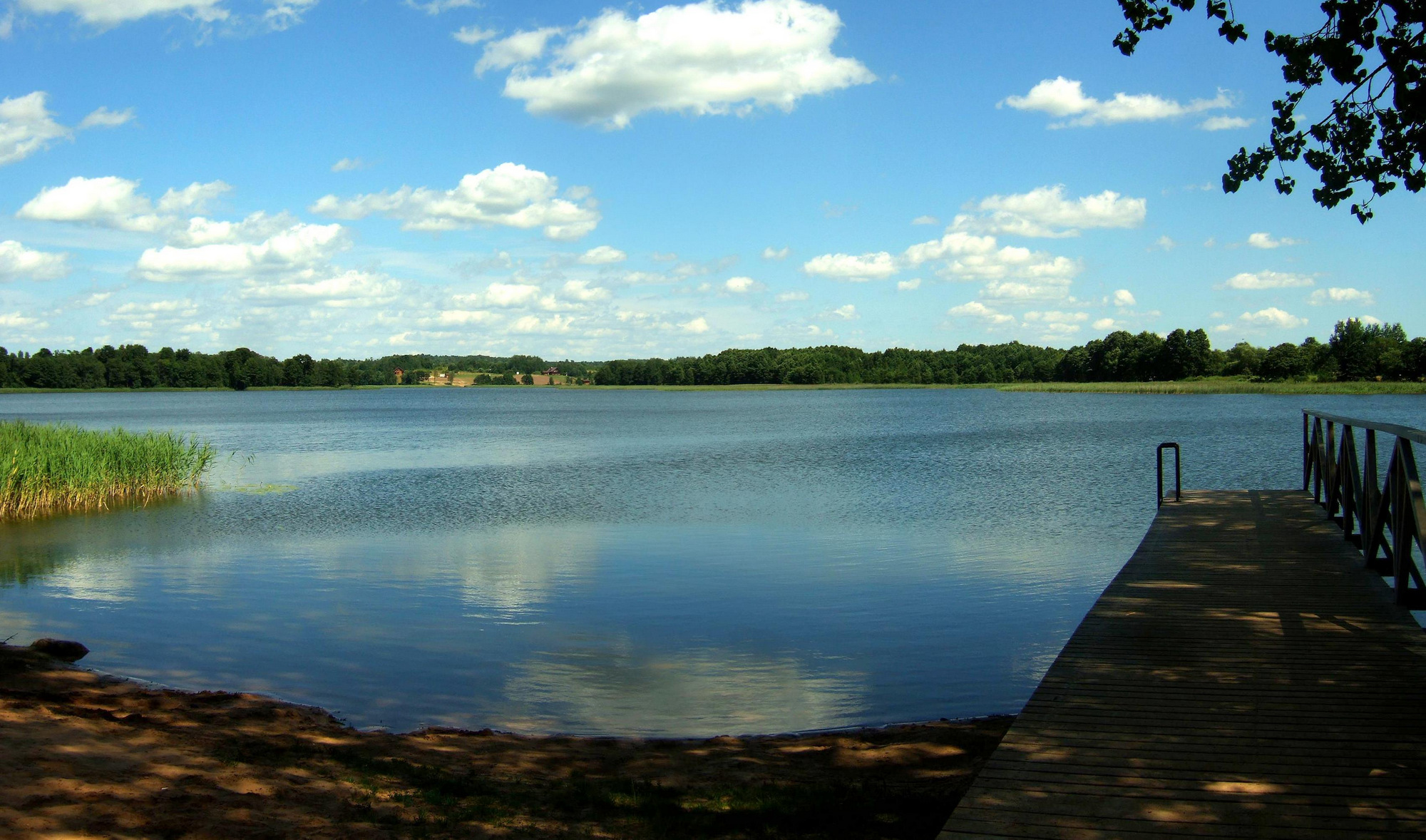
Kiementas lake
