= Rokiškis Music School =

Coordinates: 55°57′51″N 25°35′05″E

Rokiškis Music School (Lithuanian: Rokiškio muzikos mokykla) was a music school sponsored by the Tyzenhaus family that operated in Rokiškis (present-day Lithuania) from 1873 to 1904. While it focused on preparing church organists, several prominent Lithuanian interwar musicians were its alumni (e.g. Mikas Petrauskas, Juozas Gruodis, Juozas Tallat-Kelpša, etc.).

== History ==
The first music school was transferred to Rokiškis from Hrodna by the Tyzenhaus family in 1785, but information about this school has not survived. The Tyzenhaus family reestablished a music school in 1873. The family had similar music schools in Aknīste (present-day Latvia) and Pastavy (present-day Belarus) that were closed in 1883 once the school in Rokiškis became more professional.

It first taught orchestra and choir. In 1883, it added fortepiano, church organ, and hymns sections, but four years later it was downsized to just teach church organs. The school also had a branch in Obeliai, but it closed around 1884.

The school was located in a one-floor building near the Church of St. Matthias and had only two rooms. The school was tuition-free and taught boys and girls from Rokiškis and neighboring towns. More gifted students were provided residence and a stipend of six silver rubles a month by the Tyzenhaus family. The school had its own orchestra and mixed choir which performed at Rokiškis Manor and the Church of St. Matthias. In 1878, the school performed oratorio The Creation by Joseph Haydn which was translated into Lithuanian by Silvestras Gimžauskas. The school also searched for Lithuanian translators of Te Deum by Wolfgang Amadeus Mozart and works by Robert Führer.

In 1883, Czech Rudolf Liehmann was hired to run the school. He was son of organist and composer Antonín Liehmann and was educated at the Prague Conservatory by organist František Blažek. Liehmann expanded school curriculum and hoped to reorganize the school into a conservatory, but the Tyzenhaus family were not receptive to the idea and the curriculum was reduced to just church organs in 1887. Liehmann improved the school and obtained two church organs and a piano for its needs. The education lasted four years and was focused on practice. Liehmann organized the schedule so that each student would practice organs and piano every day. It meant that students practiced from early morning (6 or 7 a.m.) to late night (9 p.m.). Music theory (solfège, harmony, basic music theory, basic singing theory, history of musical instruments) was taught for 1.5 hours and singing for one hour a day. According to a 1887 report by Liehmann, the students could perform 30 different operatic arias and 22 masses. The repertoire included works by Robert Führer, Julius Otto Grimm, František Zdeněk Skuherský, as well as two Easter hymns by Liehmann.

The school diminished and was closed after Liehmann's death in 1904. A music school in Rokiškis was reestablished in 1958 and was named after Liehmann in 2011. Courses for church organists were introduced by Rokiškis Culture School (now part of Panevėžys College) in 1991. Since 2000, the school organizes annual church organ festivals.

== Directors ==
The school was headed by:

- Antanas Kulikauskas (1873–1876)
- Jonas Krupskis (1876)
- Glemitas (1876–1877)
- Pranciškus Matužinskis (1877)
- Rudolf Liehmann (1883–1904)

== Notable alumni ==
More than 200 students graduated from the school under Liehmann's leadership, among them several musicians who became prominent figures in Lithuanian music during the interwar years:

- Mikas Petrauskas
- Juozas Gruodis
- Juozas Tallat-Kelpša
- Juozas Katelė
- Juozas Gaubas
