= Salos Manor =

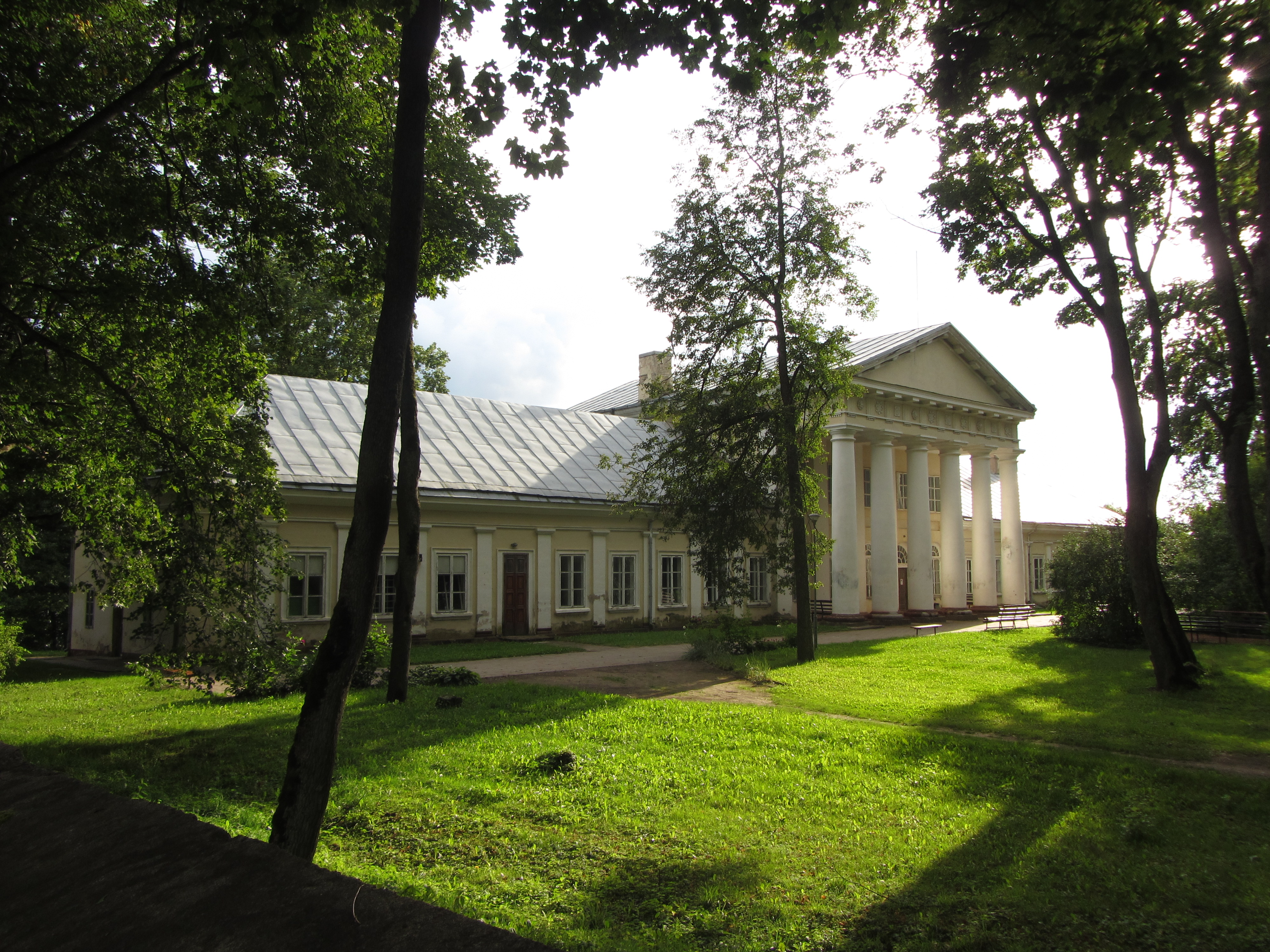
- Interactive map of the Salos Manor area

General information
- Type: Manor House
- Architectural style: Classical
- Location: Salos 42314, Lithuania
- Coordinates: 55°48′41.4″N 25°22′02.6″E
- Construction started: Late 1700s
- Owner: Privately owned

Design and construction
- Architect: Pietro de Rossi

Salos Manor (Lithuanian: Salų dvaras) is a former residential manor in Rokiškis district municipality, Lithuania.

== History ==
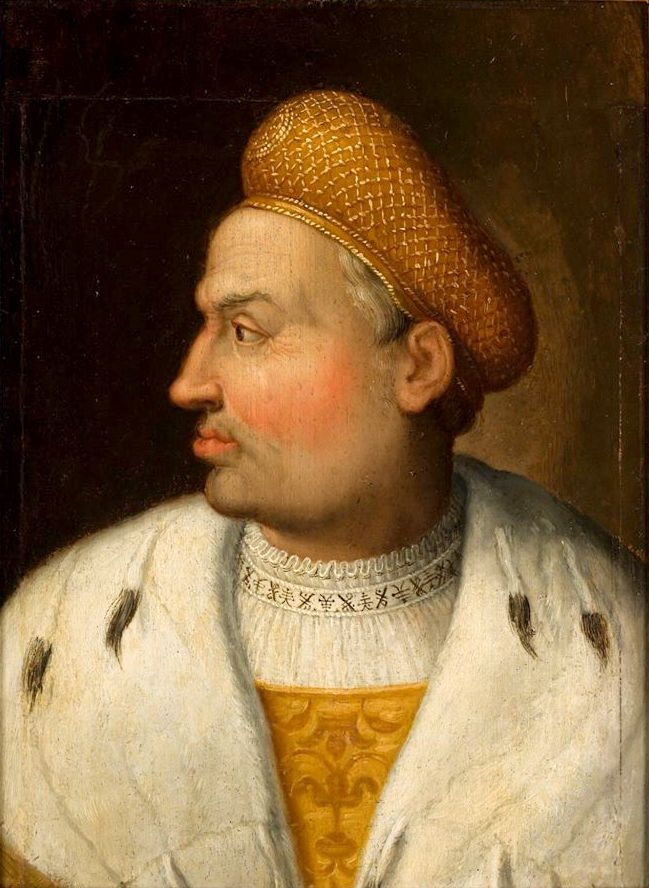
Sigismund the Old

=== King of Poland and Grand Duke of Lithuania ===
In medieval times the entire area on which Salos Manor sits was owned by the King of Poland and the Grand Duke of Lithuania.

Sigismund the Old (1467-1548) gave the surrounding land as gifts to his relatives and supporters. Salos, as mentioned in the Chronicle of Poland, Lithuania, Samogitia and all of Ruthenia (1582) by Maciej Stryjkowski, including the lands and forests, lakes and swamps, became the property of the powerful Lithuanian Radziwiłł family.

=== The Radziwiłł Family ===
In the 16th century, Salos Estate is mentioned as being property of the Nesvizh line of the Radziwiłł family.

The Radziwiłł family preferred living close to the king in Vilnius or Kraków, from where their family position could be better preserved and, possibly, strengthened. Historians believe that none of the family members ever resided in Salos, yet they visited the area to hunt. At that time, there was a wooden manor house on a stone foundation.

At about the same time when Salos became the property of the Radziwiłł family, i.e. in about 1518, Bona Maria Sforza (1494-1557), daughter of Gian Galeazzo Sforza (1469-1494), the Duke of Milan, and Isabella di Aragona (1470-1524), arrived in Kraków, Poland.

It goes without saying that the young offspring of the Duke of Milan and the future wife of Sigismund the Old, did not venture into the remote, cold land full of forests and bears, as the Kingdom of Poland was depicted by Italian chroniclers, all by herself, without any escort. For three months she sailed from Italy accompanied by a whole team of courtiers with their families and servants, including representatives of the family of Moriconi.

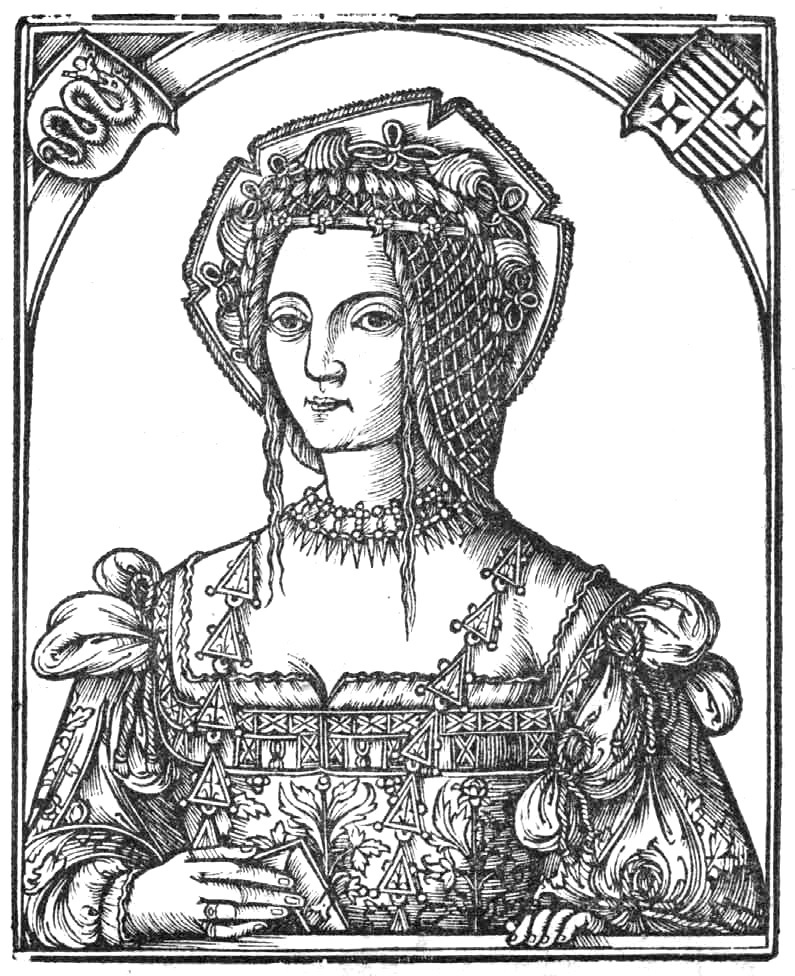
Bona Sforza in 1517

The Moriconi family were powerful in Italy. In the 14th century part of the family moved to the Duchy of Milan from Florence, where they became close to the court of Duke Sforz and became clients, and later courtiers, of the dukes. That was why the Moriconi were on board the ship that carried the bride of King Sigismund the Old.

The Radziwiłł family were not as influential in the Kingdom of Poland as they were in the Grand Duchy of Lithuania and, consequently, they were trying to find ways to strengthen their position in the lands of the Crown of Poland. The best way, it was thought, was to get closer to the King so that he would rule in favour of the Radziwiłł family. The possibility to accomplish that (also exploited later by those who descended from the Radziwiłł family and numerous others) was by coming closer to the King's wife, since the King would mostly listen to his wife. In these times the Queen hardly ever appeared without escort, she was always surrounded by courtiers, and that was how the Radziwiłł family became acquainted with the Moriconi family.

=== The Moriconi Family ===
The Moriconi family, whose representatives had been settled in the Crown of Poland by Queen Bona in the 1530s, moved to Lithuania in the 17th century. Their position in the Polish-Lithuanian state was rather strong, presumably due to relations of kinship. Offsprings of the Moriconi family married representatives of powerful Polish and Lithuanian families, including the Radziwiłł family. Relations with the Radziwiłł family were of special importance to the Moriconi family, the family being quite new and hardly known in Lithuania. It is important that marriages brought new lands and riches into the hands of the Moriconi family.

This is what happened with the village of Salos and the surrounding areas: they were handed over by the Radziwiłł family to the Moriconi family, first as a pledge, and eventually the lands became the property of the Moriconi family.

==== Krzysztof Moriconi ====
The first historically-affirmed owner of Salos was Krzysztof Moriconi, mentioned in 1733.

Krzysztof's wife, Theresa Moriconi (née Dambrowska) had three sons: Franciszek, Michał and Marcian Ignatius Moriconi (1720-1794).

==== Marcian Ignatius Moriconi (1720-1794) ====
Marcian, who was the Treasurer of the Grand Duchy of Lithuania and the elder of Ukmergė in 1771, was given Salos and Taujėnai by his father.

Marcian Ignatius married Benedykt Tyzenhauz's daughter Alexandra (born c1725) and they had two sons: Benedykt Moriconi (1750-1839) and Ignacy Moriconi (1754-1823).

==== Ignacy Moriconi (1754-1823) ====
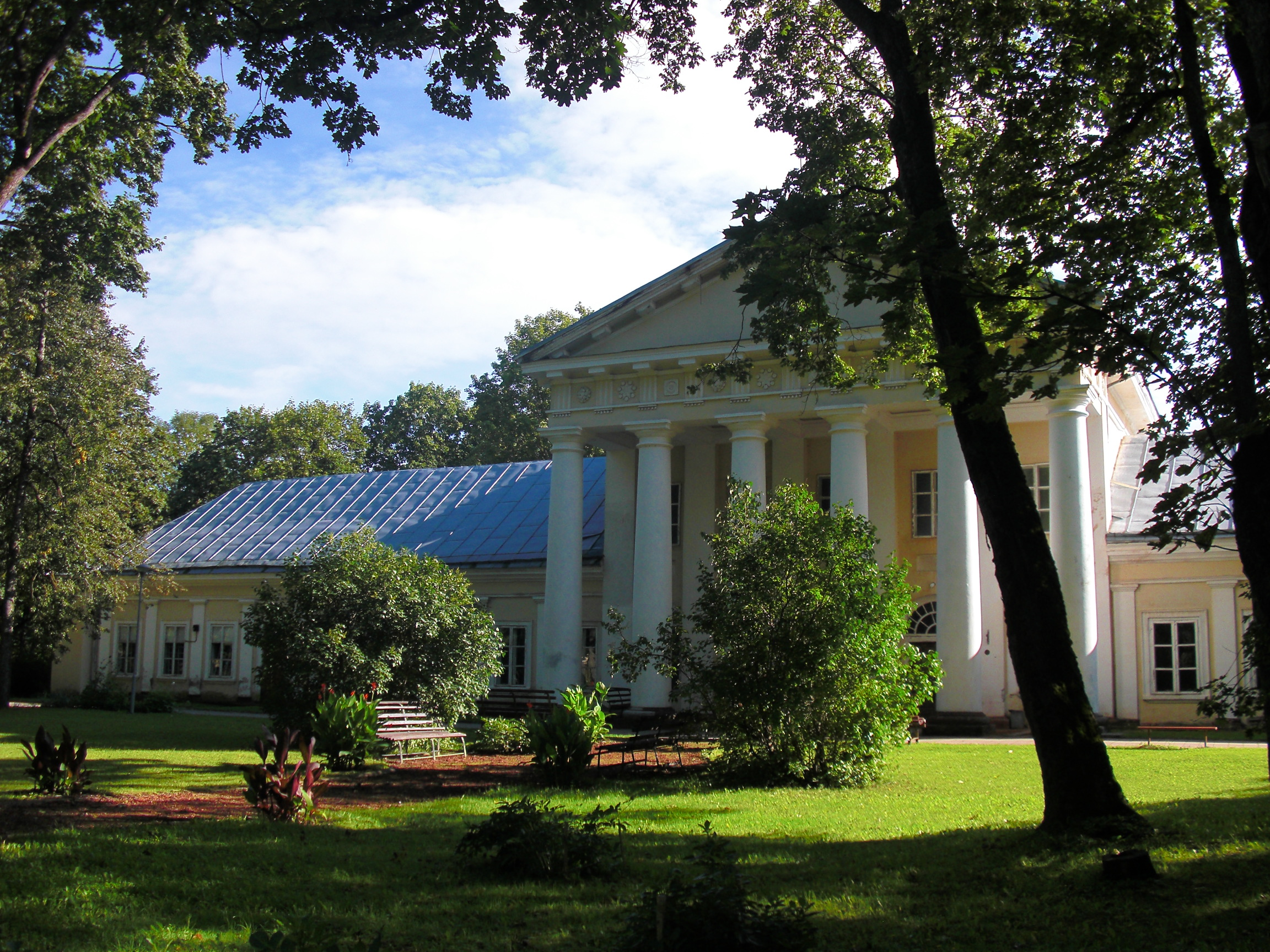
Salos Manor

Ignacy inherited Salos Estate and, according to one account had the Neoclassical mansion, possibly designed by Pietro de Rossi, built at the end of the century.

Ignacy Moriconi was notorious for his cheapness both in respect of himself and the people around him. For instance, he allowed his wife Helena Billewicz to go shopping in Vilnius only once a year and he himself used to wear clothes until they practically fell apart. Nonetheless, he was generous to the church and the peasants. In 1781 he had the Holy Cross Church built and in 1784 he took charge of the construction of the St. Francis Seraph Church in Aleksandravėlė. It was also by his initiative that a school for peasants was established on the estate and a village hospital and small pharmacy were established, which lets us conclude that such practice in this part of Europe at the beginning of the 19th century was hardly regular, if undertaken at all. It is also worth noting that in his will Ignacy Moriconi cancelled all debts owing to him by the peasants on the estate.

Ignacy and his brother Benedykt Moriconi (who was born in Salos Manor) took part in the Kościuszko Uprising of 1794. Benedykt was one of the leaders and commanders of the uprising in Lithuania. After the uprising started in Aukštaitija, Benedykt brought together a part of the local rebels, dressed as horsemen in the Hungarian Hussar uniforms, which he had kept in his warehouses since 1812.

==== Benedict Moriconi (1750-1839) ====
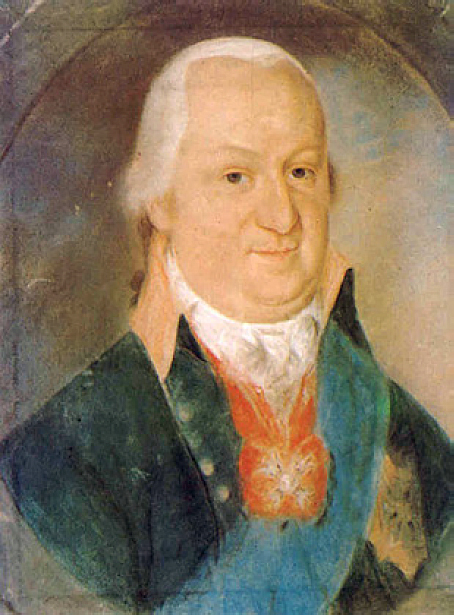
Benedict Moriconi. 1786

After the death of Ignacy, the estate was inherited by his brother, Benedict Moriconi.

Count Benedict Moriconi died on December 11, 1839, at Salos Manor. He was buried in the family grave at Troškūnai Manor (Smėlynė Manor).

==== Hieronim Moriconi (c1770-1832) ====
Benedictt's brother, Hieronim Moriconi (c1770-1832) inherited Salos.

Hieronim was married to Gertrude Sacken (born c1790). The elder wrote a testament to his entire property for two Moriconi sisters before his death, but this was protested by Strutinsky (probably Hieronim Justyn Strutyński (1771-1850)).

Salos Manor was passed down to Hieronim's son Liucijon Moriconi (1818-1893).

==== Liucijon Moriconi (1818-1893) ====
Liucijon, well known as a patriot but by character did not resemble his father. In his diary Jakub Gieysztor (Jokūbas Geištaras) wrote about him:

“Liucijon was a very rich person, one of the richest in Kaunas province, educated, straightforward, but totally impractical.”

He was not good at managing the people on his lands and he lost his property quickly. Part of his lands he lost before the January Uprising. Liucijon took part in the 1863 Uprising and later he was detained and arrested for his participation. He was imprisoned for a few months in Vilnius. His second wife Elizabeth Munday, pleaded for his release which duly happened, and later spent a whole year in a prison in Kaunas. When he was finally released from prison, he had no funds and had to sell Salos to Count Rejnold Tyzenhauz (1830-1880). Impoverished, Liucijon Moriconi moved to Warsaw in his old age, where he worked as a teacher until his death on February 14, 1893. He was buried in Vilnius, in Rasos cemetery.

=== The Tyzenhauz/Przeździecki Family ===
==== Count Rejnold Tyzenhauz (1830-1880) ====
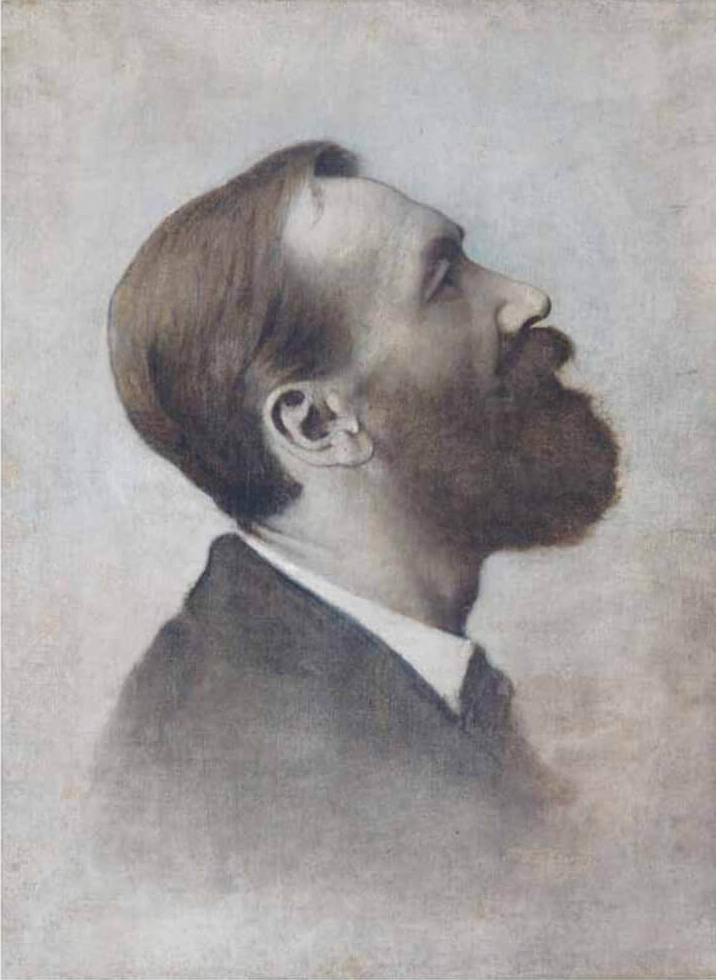
Rejnold Tyzenhauz

Rejnold Tyzenhauz had inherited Rokiškis Manor in 1853 from his father, Count Konstanty Tyzenhauz (1786-1853). Liucijon Moriconi moved to Warsaw, where he worked as a teacher until his death. According to the legend and stories told by later owners, after his death Liucijon Moriconi returned to Salos and the rooms of the palace are still haunted by his ghost.

When in the hands of the Tyzenhauz family, Salos became the cultural centre of the area. The venue was famous for the best parties in Kaunas province, attended by the cream of society, even those from Vilnius. The park served as a place for a summer theatre stage where actors, invited by the Tyzenhauz family from other provinces and as far as France, performed. In the 19th century the manor had one of the first Lithuanian music school orchestras led by Jurgelionis. Although for the most part of the year the Tyzenhauz family lived in Pastovys (Pastavy), they took good care of Salos Manor. In these days, the walls of the rooms were decorated with tapestries brought from England.

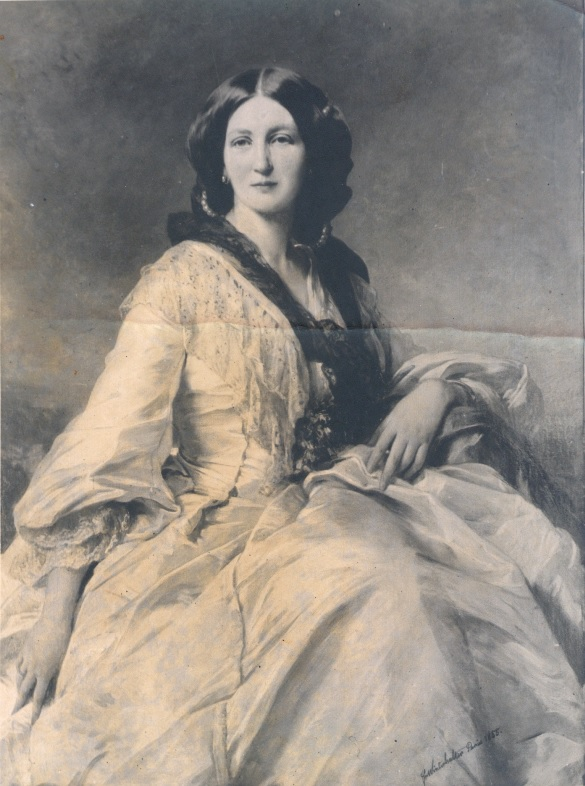
Maria Przeździecka

==== Maria Przeździecka née Tyzenhauz (1827-1890) ====
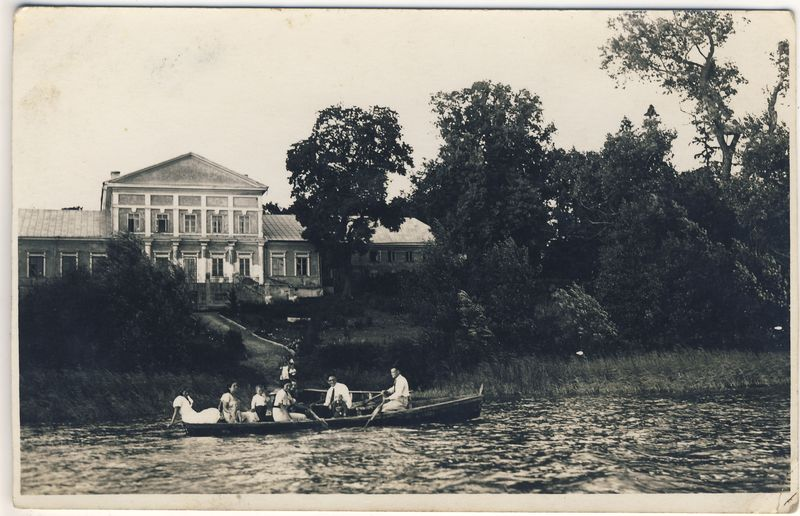
Salos Manor from lake 1937

Rejnold Tyzenhauz had no children and after his death Salos went to his sister Maria Przeździecka née Tyzenhauz (1827-1890). That was the end of the ‘golden age’ of Salos, as the new owners lived only in Pastovys or Rokiškis Manor and Salos Manor was inhabited by tenants.

==== Konstanty Gabriel Kazimierz Przeździecki (1876-1966) ====
The last owner of Salos was Maria Przeździecka's grandson Konstanty Gabriel Kazimierz Przeździecki (1876-1966) a diplomat and writer, the author of monographs on Vilnius and Warsaw, a very educated person, but, as the story goes, a person with a serious drawback - not being able to dance. When asked why he did not dance, he used to reply that he had been brought up in the Vatican.

At the start of World War II Konstanty, who had been a Colonel in the Polish Army, left for Sweden, where he died in 1966.

=== The Interwar Period ===
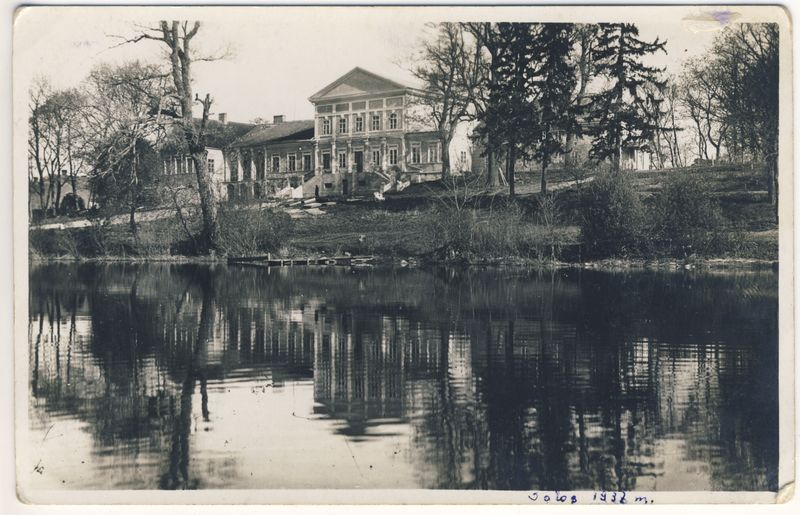
Salos Manor (1937)

After World War I, a girls' school was set up in the manor house, and in 1924, the manor was handed over to A. Čeičas, head of Antalieptė agricultural school (94 ha of land and 23 buildings).

=== The Soviet Period ===
After World War II, agricultural engineering was established in the manor.

The estate complex began to be studied in 1969. Fortunately, in the post-war period the manor house was hardly damaged and in 1977 art historians began renovations.

=== Lithuanian Independence ===
The manor house functioned as a school until 2003.

It now serves as a venue for private celebrations and cultural events.
