= Rokiškis =

- City
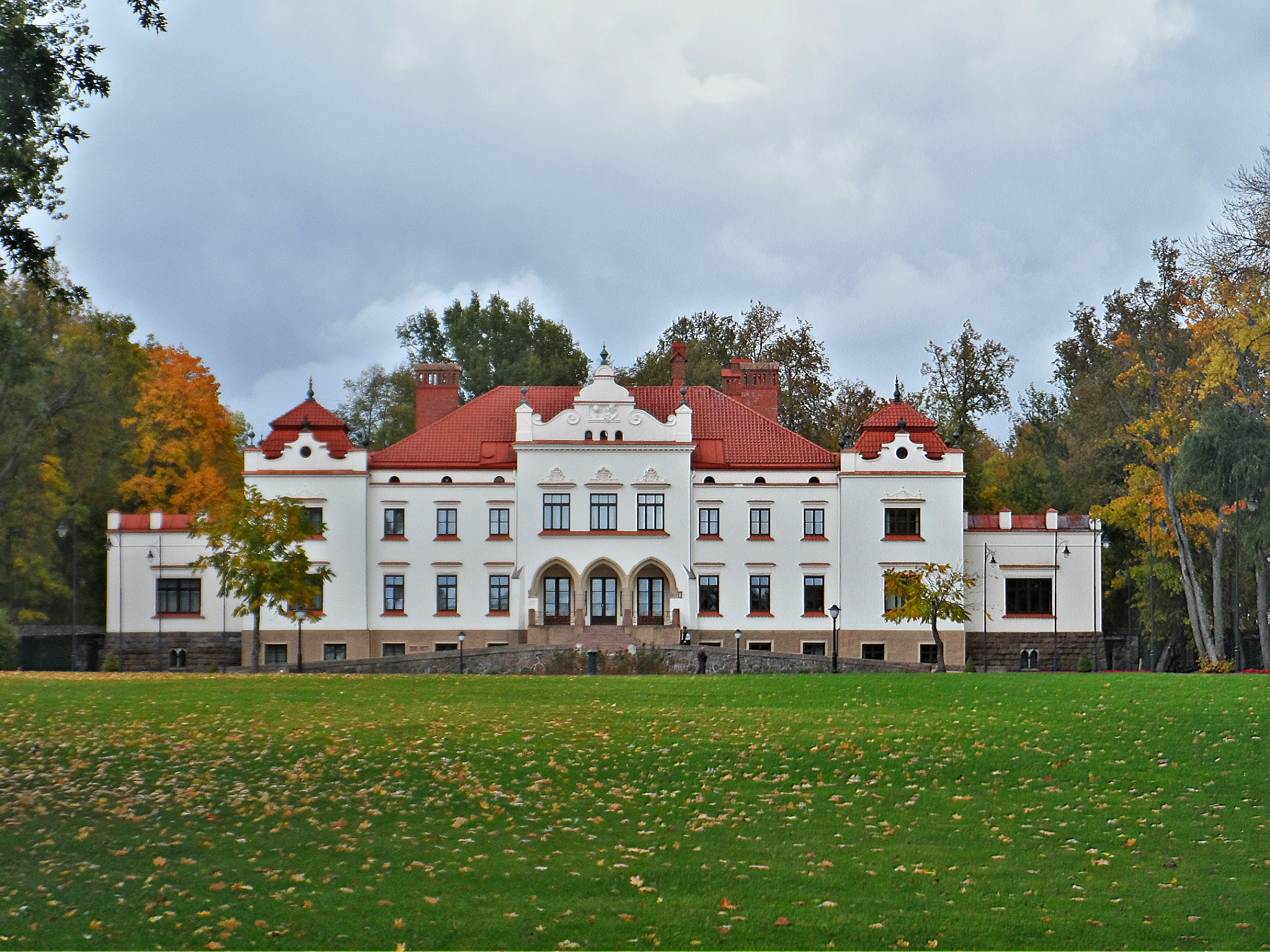
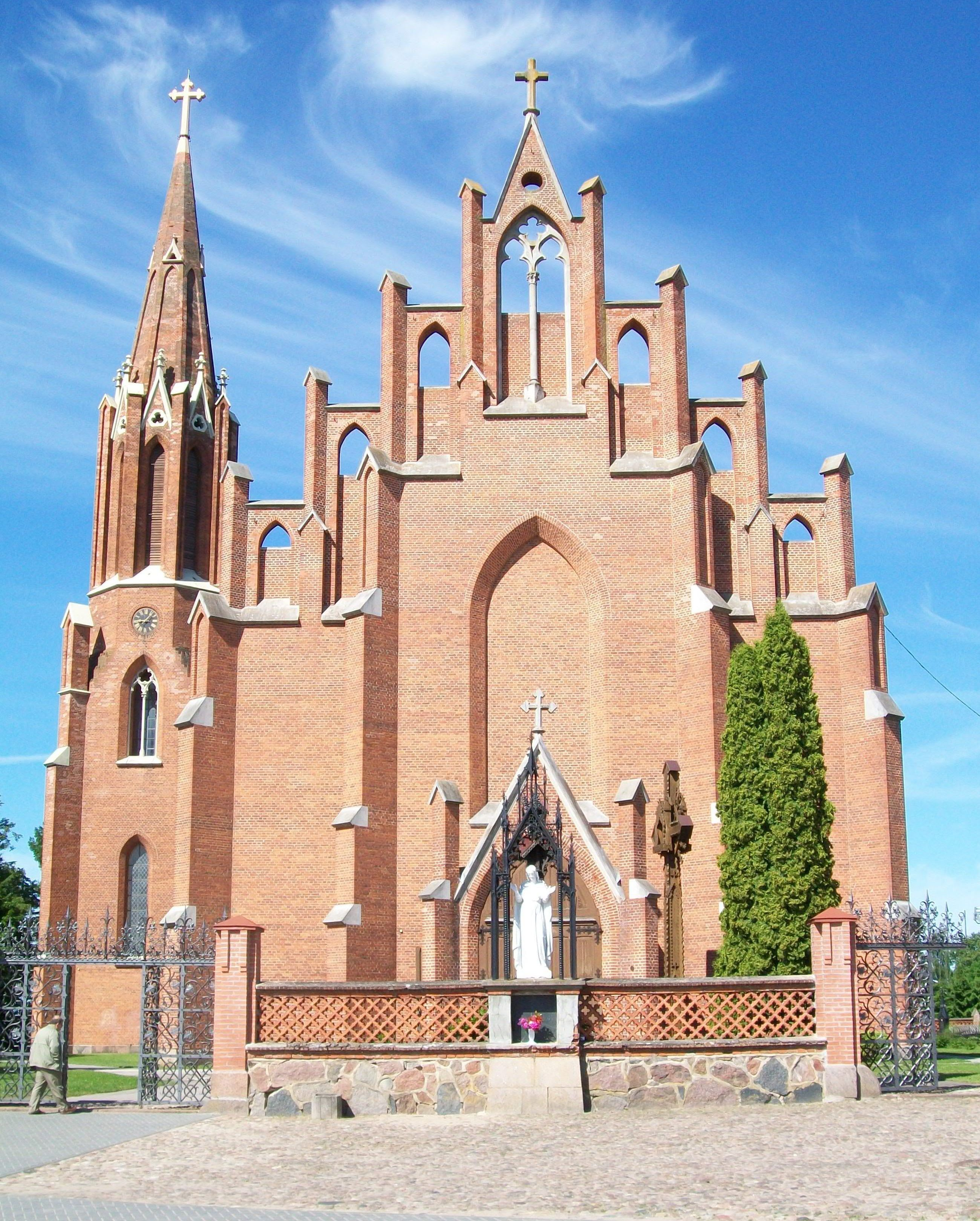
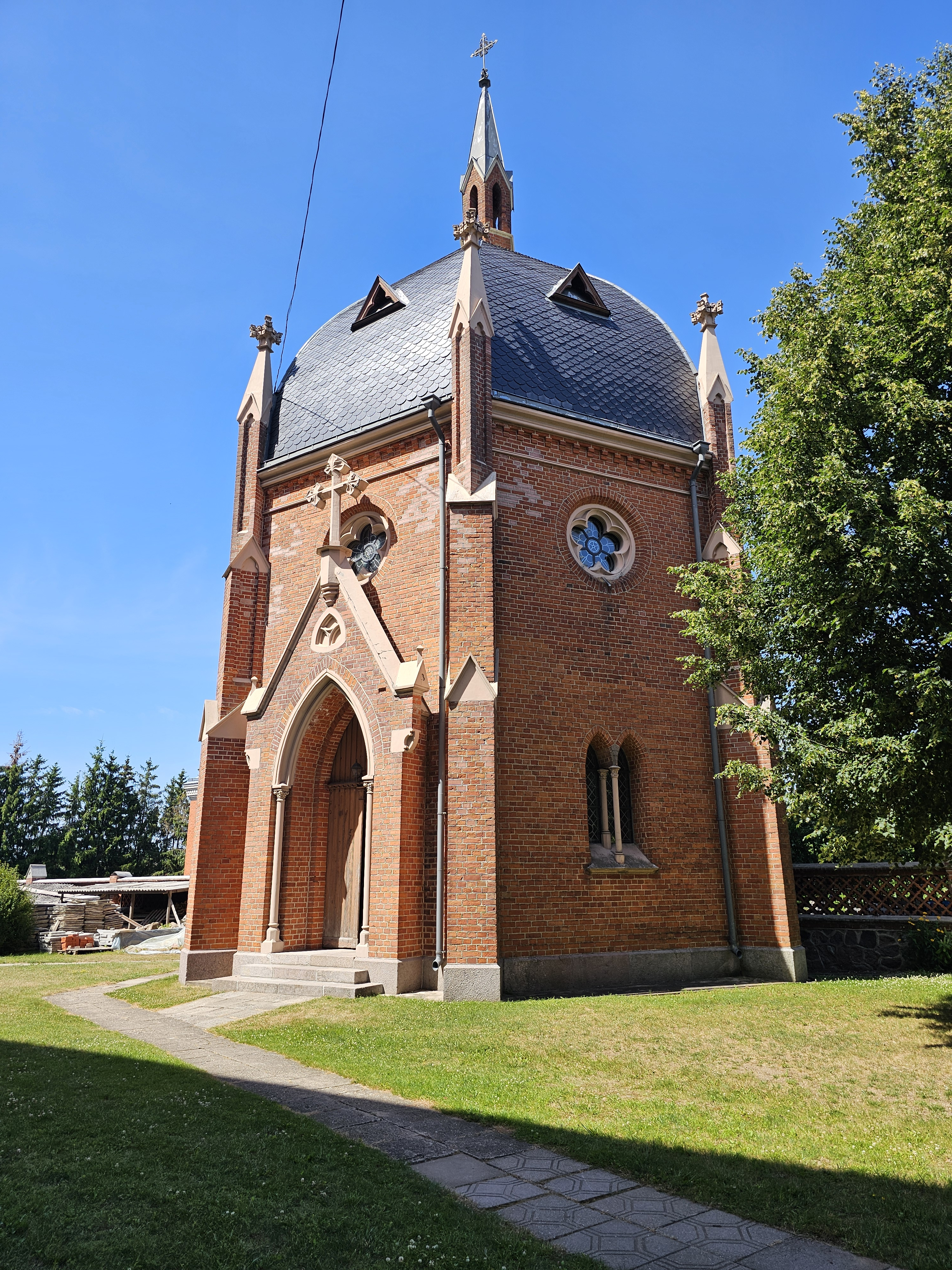
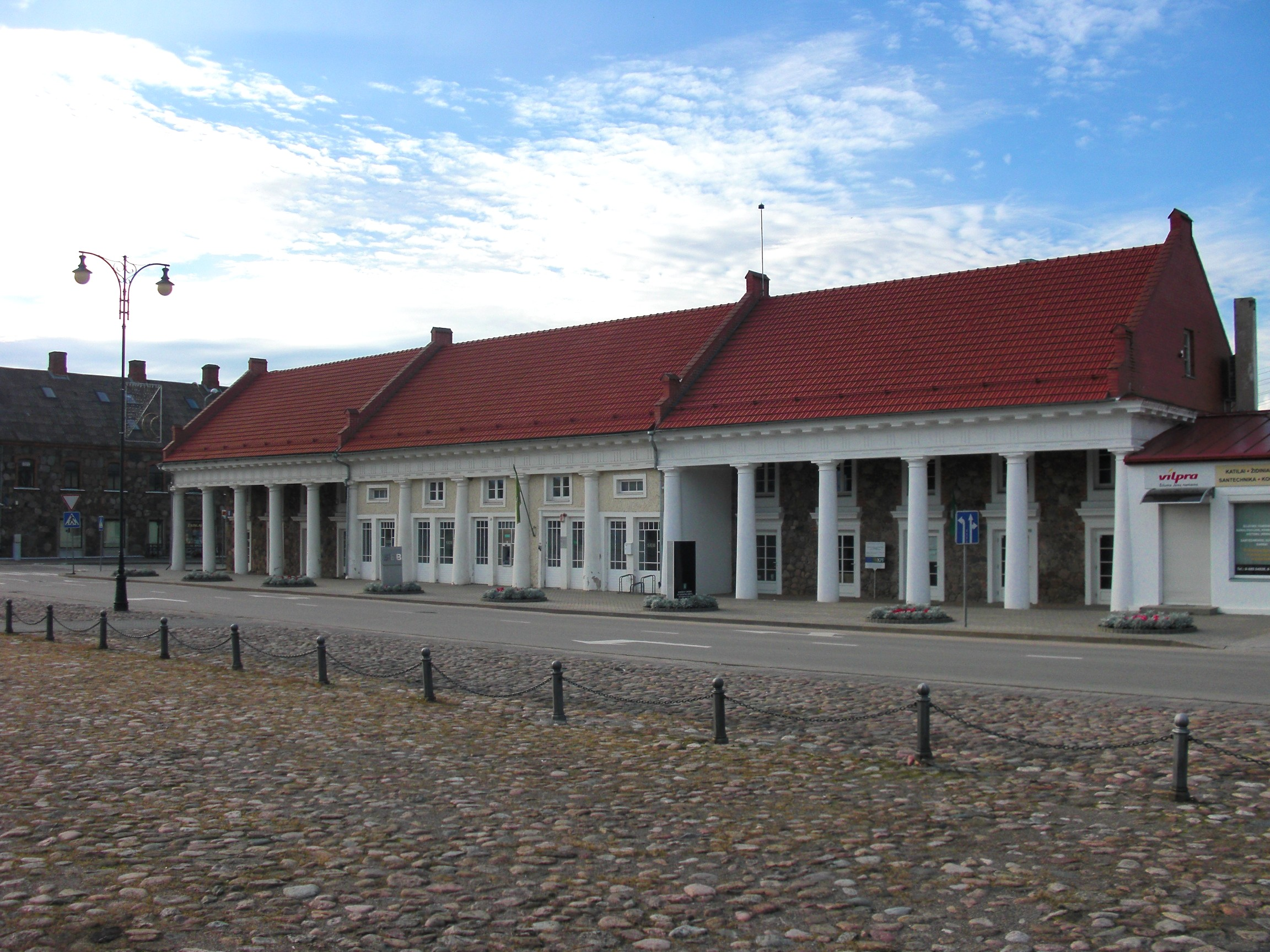
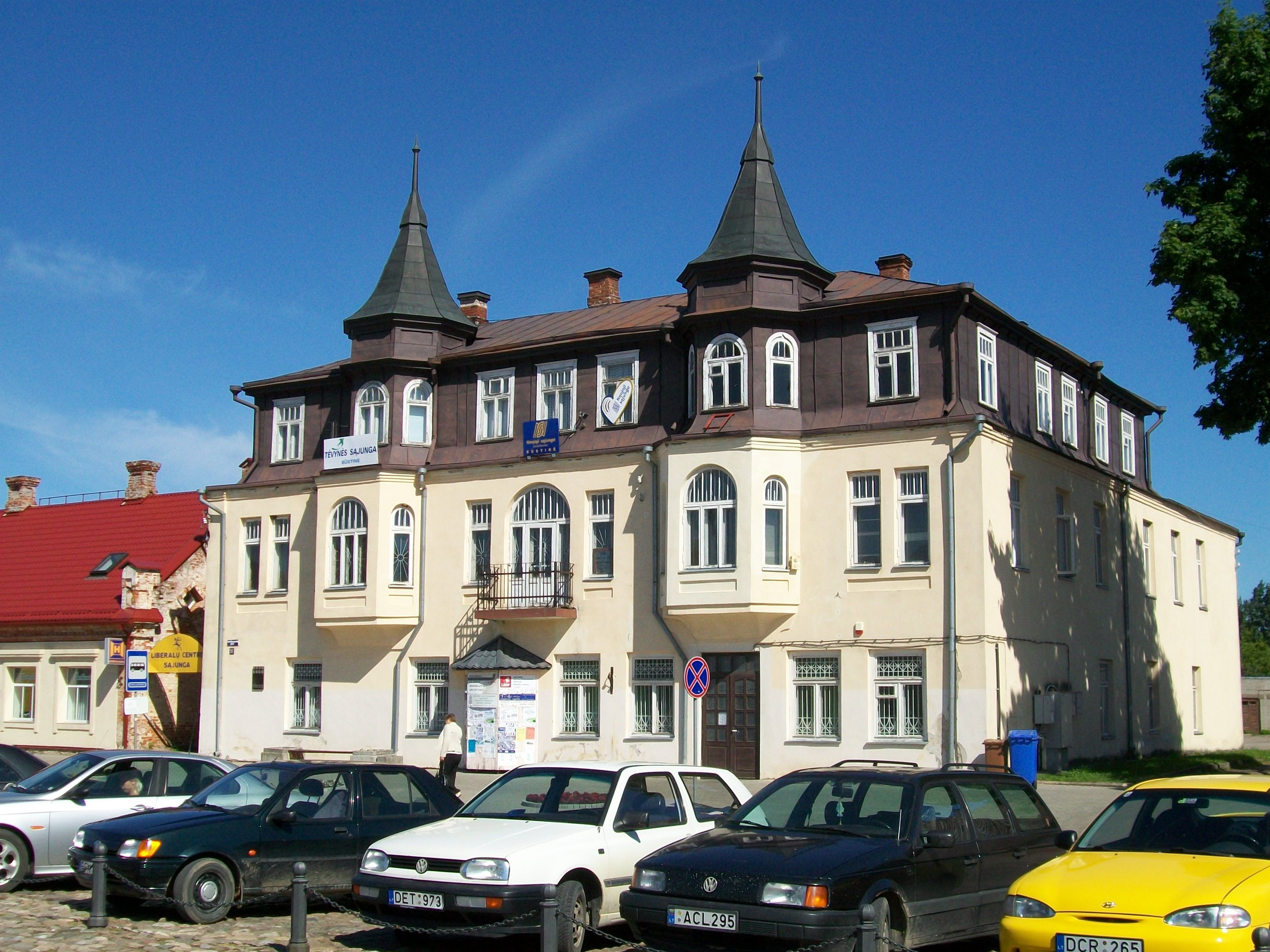
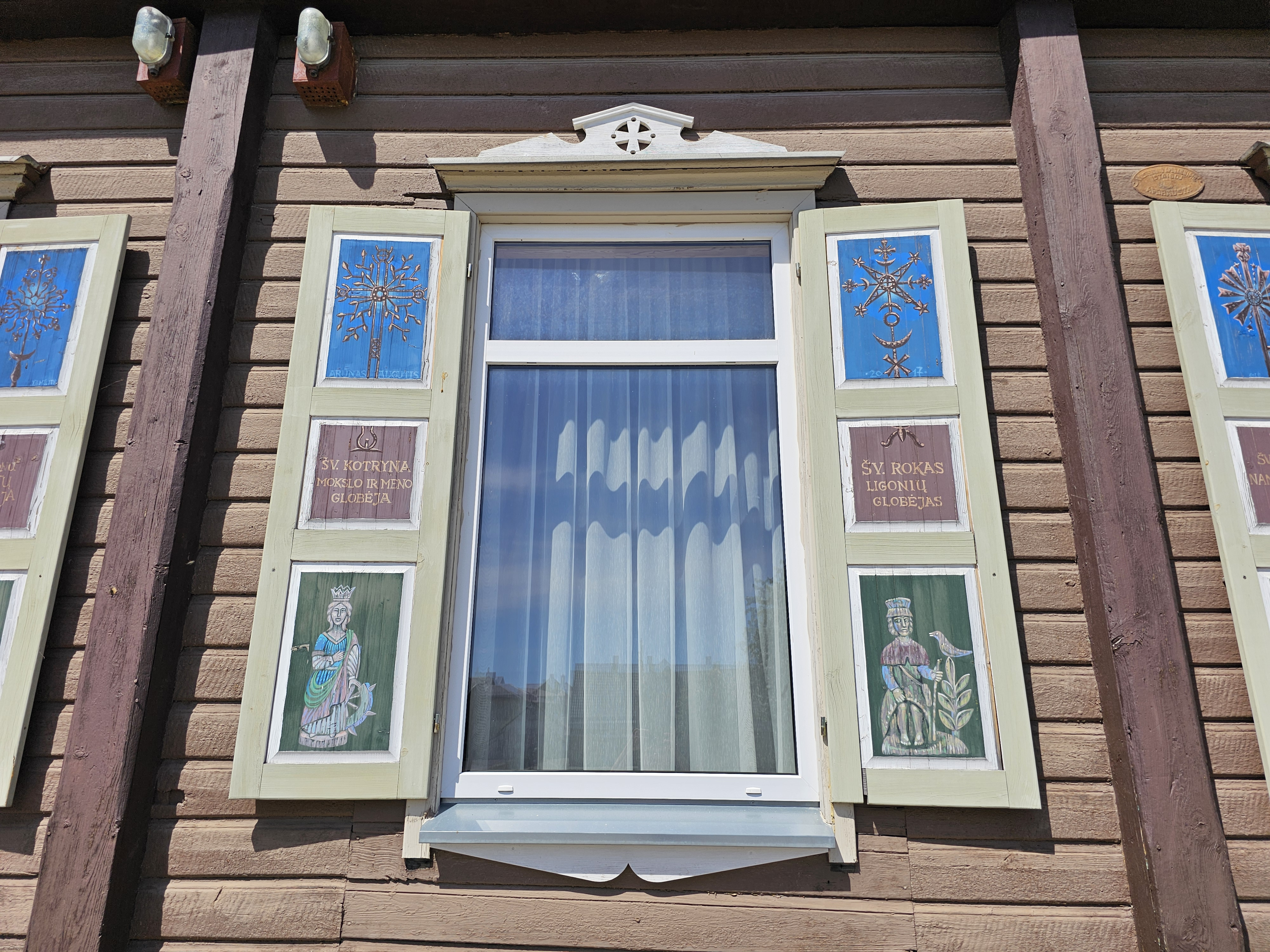
- Façade of the Rokiškis Manor Church of St. Matthew Chapel of St. Joseph Old Town buildings in Independence Square Old house in city center Window shutters of a wooden building Culture Center

- Flag Coat of arms

- Location of Rokiškis
- Coordinates: 55°58′0″N 25°35′0″E
- Country: Lithuania
- Ethnographic region: Aukštaitija
- County: Panevėžys County
- Municipality: Rokiškis district municipality
- Eldership: Rokiškis town eldership
- Capital of: Rokiškis district municipality Rokiškis town eldership Rokiškis rural eldership
- First mentioned: 1499
- Granted city rights: 1920

Population (2023)
  - Total: 11,606
- Time zone: UTC+2 (EET)
  - Summer (DST): UTC+3 (EEST)

Rokiškis is a city in northeastern Lithuania, close to the Latvia–Lithuania border, with a population of 11,606 (2023). The city is a capital of the Rokiškis District Municipality with a population of 28,715 (2021). It is governed by the Rokiškis City Eldership.

The city center (Rokiškis Old Town) formed in the late 18th century when Rokiškis was ruled by Tyzenhauz family. The Rokiškis Manor and the Church of St. Matthew are valuable examples of the 19th century architecture in Lithuania and a central pedestrian road through the Independence Square and Tyzenhauzų St. connect the Church with the Manor's Palace. The Laukupė River is flowing through the city.

== History ==
Rokiškis was the location of one of many Roman Catholic churches where the priests had to know the Lithuanian language according to the Grand Duke of Lithuania Alexander Jagiellon in 1501

The legend of the founding of Rokiškis tells about a hunter called Rokas who had been hunting for hares (Lit. "kiškis"). However, cities ending in "-kiškis" are quite popular in the region. The Rokiškis Manor was first mentioned in 1499 when it was ruled by a Lithuanian noble Grigalius Astikas. At first, it was Prince Kroszyński's residence, later count Tyzenhaus build a neogothic Church of St. Matthew and Rokiškis Manor, which is well preserved today and houses the Rokiškis Regional Museum. The town was planned in a classicist manner.

Rokiškis was part of the Grand Duchy of Lithuania that was later also part of the Polish–Lithuanian Commonwealth until 1795 when it was partitioned out of existence and Rokiškis annexed by the Russian Empire.

Rokiškis was included in the Vilna Governorate, until 1843 when the Zarasai County was transferred to the newly established Kovno Governorate. Since 1873 the Tyzenhaus family sponsored the Rokiškis Music School which operated until 1904 and focused on preparing church organists, however several prominent Lithuanian interwar musicians were its alumni (e.g. Mikas Petrauskas, Juozas Gruodis, Juozas Tallat-Kelpša, etc.).

The city started to grow in 1873 when a branch of the Libava–Romny Railway was built which connected Dinaburg/Daugavpils to the east with the ice-free Baltic port of Libava/Liepāja.

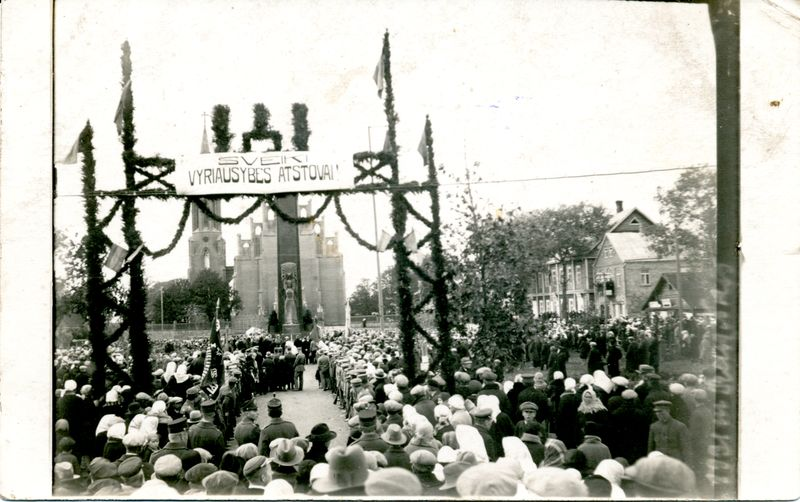
Unveiling of the Monument of 10th anniversary of Independence in Rokiškis, in 1931. The monument was funded by the Rokiškis inhabitants and withstood the Soviet occupation.

In the summer of 1915, the Imperial German army occupied the city. In early 1919 the Red Army occupied Rokiškis, however in June 1919 the Lithuanian Armed Forces liberated it from the Soviets during the Lithuanian–Soviet War and it became a part of the Republic of Lithuania. Rokiškis was granted city rights in 1920. Because of strained relationships between Lithuania and the nearby newly created Republics of Poland and Latvia, Rokiškis was economically isolated during the inter-war period. Six generations of the Komorowski family owned the Kavoliškis Manor in nearby Kavoliškis village until 1940 when Lithuania was occupied by the Soviets. Bronisław Komorowski, the President of Poland in 2010–2015, whose grandfather Juliusz Komorowski was the last Komorowski owner of the Kavoliškis Manor, is an honorary citizen of Rokiškis who personally visited Rokiškis and gifted valuable historical documents and photos to the Rokiškis Regional Museum.

After the Soviet re-occupation of Lithuania in 1944, the Lithuanian partisans fought with the Soviet Army in Rokiškis area. In 1950, Rokiškis became a center of Rokiškis district. In the ~1980s Rokiškis became one of the largest centers of education, culture, and health care in Northern Lithuania. Since August 1988 the locals of Rokiškis supported Sąjūdis movement and on 6 November 1988 had raised the national flag of Lithuania. After the Re-Establishment of the State of Lithuania in 1990, economic changes occurred in Rokiškis and some old companies were closed, however new companies also started their businesses (e.g. in 1992 Rokiškio sūris was founded, which became one of the largest dairy products producers in Lithuania and the largest cheese producer in the Baltic states). A music school named after Czech musician Rudolf Liehmann, who worked at Tyzenhaus' funded Rokiškis Music School, operates in Rokiškis.

== Coat of arms ==
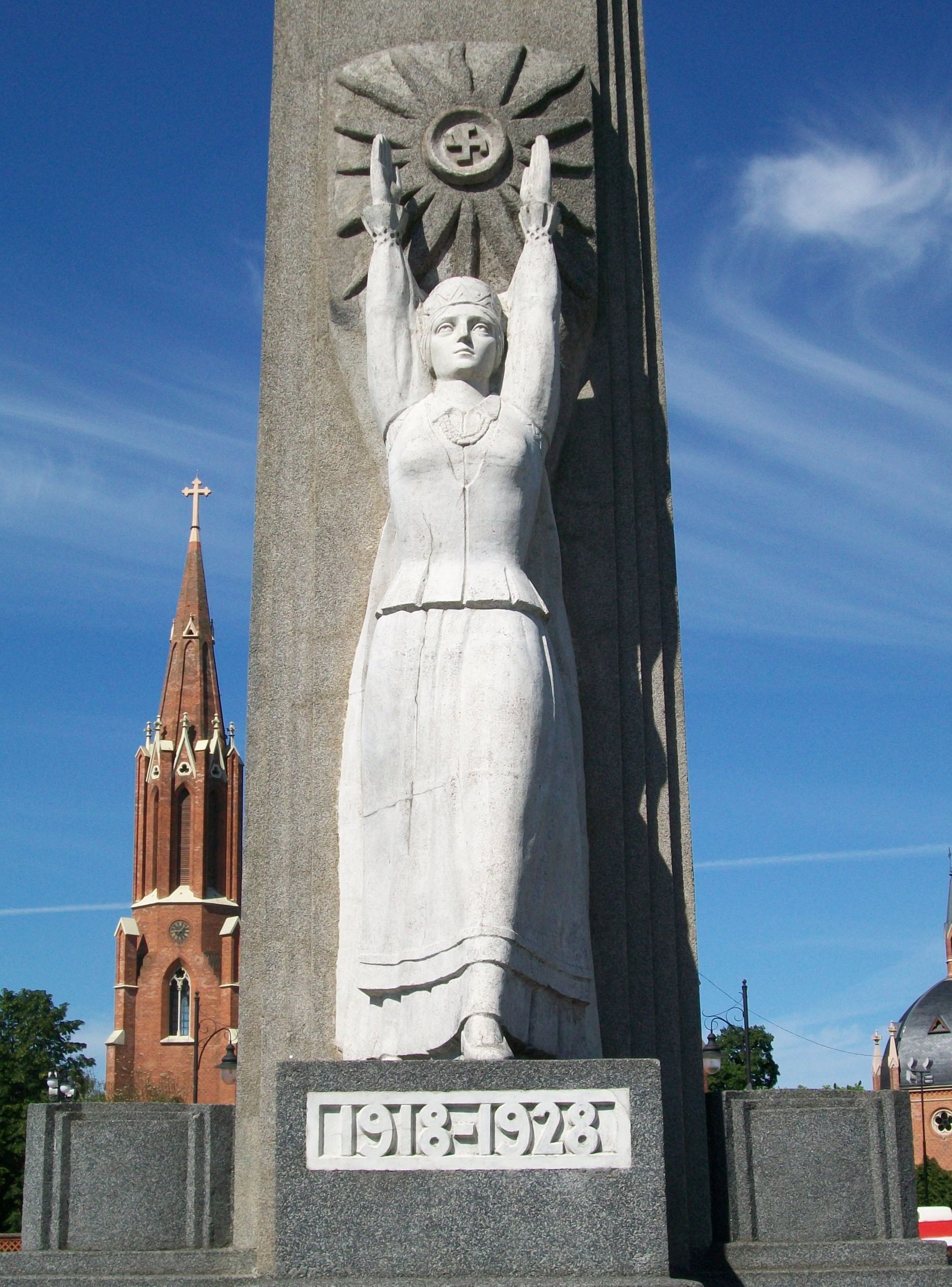
Freedom Monument in Rokiškis

The first arms for the city were designed in 1970 but were abolished the same year. The current coat of arms was approved in 1993. The shield is divided into 4 quarters. 3 of the quarters depict 3 families that ruled the city: the candelabrum represents the Kroszinski family; the bull is a symbol of the Tyzenhaus family, and three bars and a fleur-de-lis are taken from the arms of the Przezdziecki family. The fourth quarter shows the organ that is housed at the Church of St. Matthew and reflects city's musical heritage (see Rokiškis Music School).

== Industry ==
Situated on the Daugavpils-Liepaja railroad, during the 19th century Rokiškis served as a commercial center for a large rural area and a point for the export of wood, grain, and flax. Rokiškis is well known for its cheese. "Rokiškio sūris" is one of the largest cheese manufacturing companies in Lithuania. It grew from a small local dairy established in 1925. In 1964 Soviets built a specialized factory. At present after reconstructions and foreign capital investments, its sales reach 233 million euros in 2021. About 70% of the production is sold in foreign markets, mostly to Italy, Netherlands, Germany, Latvia, and United States. The company is a very important employer in the region. It is also an important supporter of community initiatives.

== Jewish history ==
There was a vibrant Jewish community in Rokiškis (Yiddish: Rakishok, Rakisik) for hundreds of years. The first Jewish settlement may have been prior to 1574 and was located at the present site of the old Jewish cemetery (about half a kilometer southwest from the market square) until the mid-1700s, when the community moved to the area near the market square and Kamai Street (now Respublikos gatvė). In 1847 there were 593 Jews in the town and in 1897 2,067 (75% of the total population). The community had a strong Hasidic movement with Lubavitch, Babroiser, and Ladier shuls. By the early 20th century, however, the haskalah (Jewish Enlightenment) had had an impact and a Jewish school with secular subjects had started, some Jewish students attended the gymnasia in Rokiškis and Dvinsk, and in 1910 a Russian gymnasium for Jewish students was established. There was also a significant revolutionary movement in the community.

In May 1915, during World War I, Jews in central Lithuania were forcibly deported to the east by order of the Czarist government. Although Jews in the Rokiškis area were not the subject of the deportation order, as the Russian forces retreated Cossacks serving in a rearguard capacity terrorized the Jews in northeastern Lithuania and most of the Jews in the Rokiškis fled to the interior of Russia. One of those who left was Yakov (Yankel) Smushkevich who later became the commander of the Soviet Air Forces before being purged and executed in 1941. The Germans occupied Rokiškis until 1918.

When World War I ended and the Republic of Lithuania was established, Lithuanian Jews were permitted to return home. The Jewish community of Rokiškis numbered 2,013 in 1923. Initially the community thrived, shuls reopened and in addition there were strong, competing socialist and Zionist movements. Rokiškis developed rapidly after World War I but under different economic conditions. Before the war, for example, Rokiškis could trade with nearby Dvinsk/Daugavpils/Dunaburg, Latvia, to which it was connected by a rail line. During the 1920s, however, Lithuania's border with Latvia was closed. As a result, trade increased with towns to the west which were connected by rail lines, such as Panevėžys/Ponevizh, Šiauliai/Shavli, and Kaunas/Kovno. (There was also a narrow gauge rail line to Pandėlys/Ponidel.) Prior to World War I, only 3 stores had been Christian-owned. After the war, however, many Lithuanians from surrounding villages came to settle in Rokiškis and open stores. Ori Further, Lithuanian cooperatives came into being, trade in flax and produce was nationalized, and other factors caused a severe economic decline for the Jews. Many Jewish businesses went bankrupt in 1925 and between 1926 and 1930 many Jewish families emigrated to South Africa where a landmanschaft was established in Johannesburg, the United States of America, and Palestine. In 1939 there were 3,500 Jews in Rokiškis (40% of the total population). They were mostly Chabad Chasidim. During the period of Lithuanian independence (1918–1940) there were two Hebrew schools.

The Soviets annexed Lithuania in 1940 and all Jewish businesses were confiscated. When Nazi Germany attacked the Soviet Union on 21–22 June 1941, Lithuania was quickly overrun. The Germans soon brought in special assignment squads to arrest and murder Jews. The Jews of Rokiškis and its environs were murdered in nearby woods just north of Bajorai, 400 meters east of the intersection of the northeasterly road to Juodupė and the northerly road to Lukštai. The official German army report (“the Jager Report”) states that on 15–16 August 1941, a total of 3,207 Jews were killed. Other Jews were deported to the ghetto of Joniškis and killed there.

== Notable people ==
- Algirdas Brazauskas — President of Lithuania
- Daiva Jodeikaitė — former Soviet and Lithuanian female professional basketball player
- Laima Vaitkunskienė — archaeologist

== Twin towns — sister cities ==
Rokiškis is a member of the Douzelage, a town twinning association of towns across the European Union. As of 2019, its members are:

- Agros, Cyprus
- Altea, Spain
- Asikkala, Finland
- Bad Kötzting, Germany
- Bellagio, Italy
- (Republic of Ireland) Bundoran, Ireland
- Chojna, Poland
- Granville, France
- Holstebro, Denmark
- Houffalize, Belgium
- Judenburg, Austria
- Kőszeg, Hungary
- Marsaskala, Malta
- Meerssen, Netherlands
- Niederanven, Luxembourg
- Oxelösund, Sweden
- Preveza, Greece
- Rovinj, Croatia
- Sesimbra, Portugal
- Sherborne, England, United Kingdom
- Sigulda, Latvia
- Siret, Romania
- Škofja Loka, Slovenia
- Sušice, Czech Republic
- Tryavna, Bulgaria
- Türi, Estonia
- Zvolen, Slovakia

Other twin towns

- Borșa, Romania
- Cēsis, Latvia
- Daugavpils Municipality, Latvia
- Estenfeld, Germany
- Harbin, China
- Jēkabpils, Latvia
- Ludza, Latvia
- (Georgia (country)) Ozurgeti, Georgia
- Pabianice, Poland
- Provadia, Bulgaria
- Tamsalu, Estonia
- Viesīte, Latvia
