= Rokiškis Manor =

Museum in Lithuania

Coordinates: 55°57′55″N 25°36′4″E

- Rokiškio dvaras (Lithuanian)
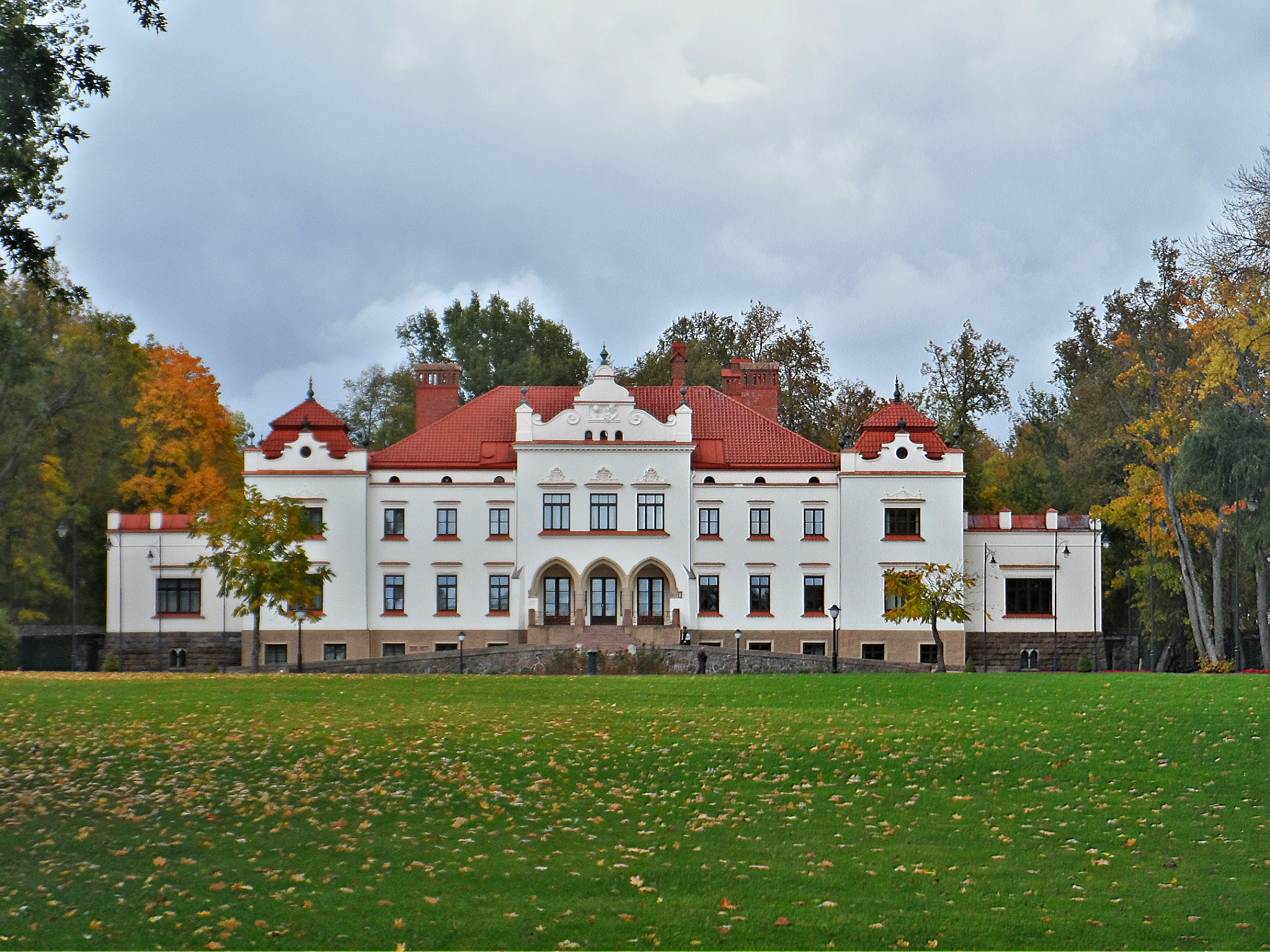
- Rokiškis Manor in 2013

- Location within Lithuania
- Interactive map of Rokiškis Manor
- Type: Residential manor
- Location: Rokiškis, Lithuania

History
- Built: 1801
- Built for: Ignotas Tyzenhauzas (Ignacy Tyzenhauz)

Site notes
- Architect(s): Karolis Jankovskis, Pranciškus Lilpopas
- Architectural style: Classical Revival
- Owner: Rokiškis Regional Museum
- Website: www.muziejusrokiskyje.lt/en

Cultural Monuments of Lithuania
- Type: National
- Designated: 20 November 2001
- Reference no.: 1010

Rokiškis Manor (Lithuanian: Rokiškio dvaras) is a former residential manor in Rokiškis, north-eastern Lithuania. From 1940 to 1942 and again from 1952, the manor house is used by Rokiškis Regional Museum.

== Architecture ==
The original manor house from the 16th century did not survive and there is little information about the appearance of the old manor house. It is known that the manor stood on a hill, was built of wood, in the shape of a cross, and had deep cellars. On the foundations of the old manor house, a neo-Gothic brewery building was built which resembled a small castle and since then colloquially referred to as the Krošinskiai Castle. During the centuries the current manor house was remodelled several times. Originally the manor house was a single-storey building in Classical Revival style with a small dome. In 1905, Jonas Pšezdzieckis began the renovation of the manor according to the project of the architects Karolis Jankovskis and Pranciškus Lilpopas. The manor became two storeys high and more spacious, but its style became mixed with Baroque Revival, neo-Renaissance and Art Nouveau features.

== History ==
=== Early history ===
Rokiškis manor was first mentioned in 1499 in the privilege of Grand Duke Alexander Jagiellon of Lithuania for cutting the forest for Jurgis Stanislovaitis Astikas. The privilege mentions Alexander's property the Rokiškis Manor. From 1503 the estate belonged to the Grand Duchess of Lithuania and Queen of Poland Helena of Moscow and briefly belonged to Voivode of Vilnius Mikalojus Radvila the Old.

From the mid-16th century onwards, the Rokiškis manor together with the town was ruled by three famous Lithuanian noble families: the Kroszyński family, presumed descendants of the House of Gediminas, Princes of Smolensk, the Tyzenhauz family of Livonia, and the Counts Przeździecki from Masuria.

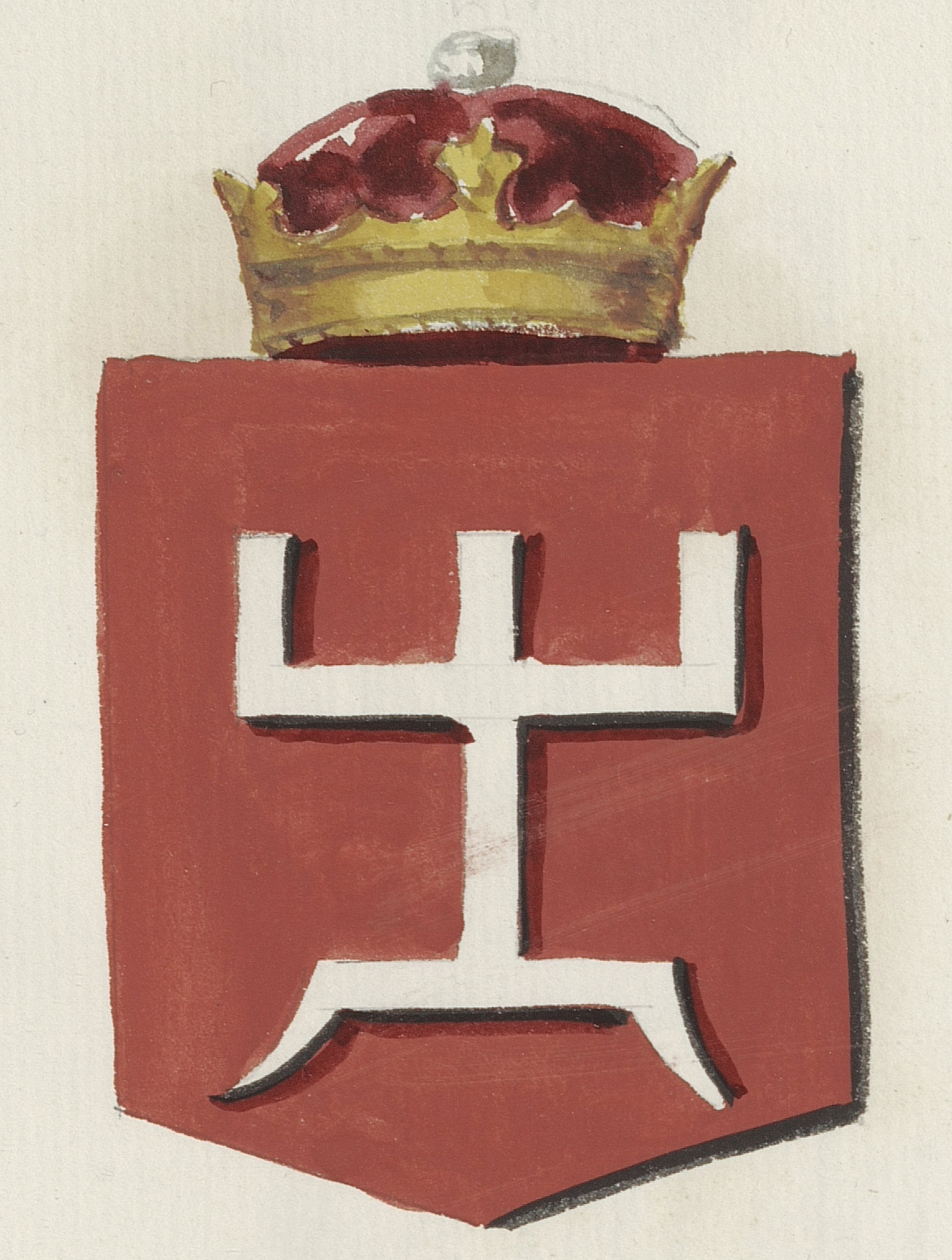
Coat of Arms of Kroszyński family

After the death of Grand Duchess Helena in 1514, the Rokiškis manor was passed on to Knyaz Timofey Filippovich Kroshinsky. By a privilege of 9 November 1547, the Grand Duke of Lithuania and King of Poland, Sigismund the Old, gave the Rokiškis manor, by right of fiefdom, to Ivan Timofeevich Kroshinsky and his descendants in perpetuity. The last members of the family, brothers Adam and Jerzy Kroszyński, lost Rakiški in 1683 and were sentenced to banishment for failing to return 96,649 złotys owed to Jan Bortkiewicz. The Kroszyńskis brought their coat of arms to Rokiškis – a silver trident on a red field. They tried to establish order in the town, prevent lawlessness, defend the market rights and promote trade. Rokiškis was located at the crossroads of important routes, with the trade route to Livonia passing through Rokiškis. However, like many noblemen of the time, the Kroszyńskis had no hesitations in both mortgaging and leasing Rokiškis. They were fierce and often quarrelled with the neighbouring lords. The old manor house where the Kroszyńskis lived has not survived. However, according to the 1634 inventory of the manor, which was headed by Vendragovskis, it is clear that the manor house stood on a hill, was built of wood, in the shape of a cross, and had large cellars. There were accessory buildings nearby and three ponds. In 1715, the Rokiškis manor was transferred to the princely family of Tyzenhaus in satisfaction of debts.

=== 18th-19th centuries ===
The Tyzenhauz family brought their coat of arms – a black buffalo on a golden field – to Rokiškis. The new owners also leased and mortgaged the manor. This had a negative impact on the development of Rokiškis and discouraged economic activity. And yet, in the 18th century, Rokiškis already had a large market square, a Saika as a measure of its volume, a blacksmith's forge, a brewery and a mill. Rokiškis flourished most at the end of the 18th century, when Ignacy Tyzenhauz, a major-general in the Grand Ducal Lithuanian Army, and a participant in the Kościuszko Uprising of 1794, became the owner of the estate and made it his permanent residence. In 1801, he commissioned a new manor house to be built in the style of classicism with two officines from both sides.

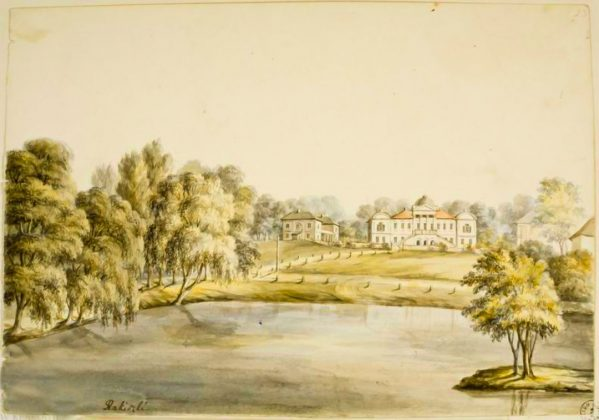
Painting of Rokiškis Manor by Napoleon Orda, 19th century

Konstanty Tyzenhauz inherited Rokiškis after the death of his father Ignacy. A military officer by profession and a renowned ornithologist by hobby, a student of professor Stanisław Bonifacy Jundziłł, he turned Rokiškis into a hub of science. He set up a laboratory and planted many tropical and warmer climate plants in the orangery. His ornithological collections amounted to some three thousand specimens, and books authored by him are used as a source of study for today's Lithuanian biology students. Konstanty's sister Zofia was also intellectually gifted and wrote over 10 historical novels.

Count Rajnold Tyzenhauz (1830–1880) replaced the serfdom on his estates with a rent tax, easing the peasants' of corvée. Founded one of the first music schools in Lithuania. On his initiative and financial support, a church in Salos and the neo-Gothic Church of St. Matthew the Apostle in Rokiškis was built in the second half of the 19th century, decorated with stained-glass windows bearing the coats of arms of the Lithuanian nobility. The Duke's sister, Maria, contributed to the interior decoration of the Rokiškis church. Her husband, historian Aleksander Przeździecki, brought to Rokiškis his family coat of arms, a silver lily with three stripes on a red field.

=== 20th century ===
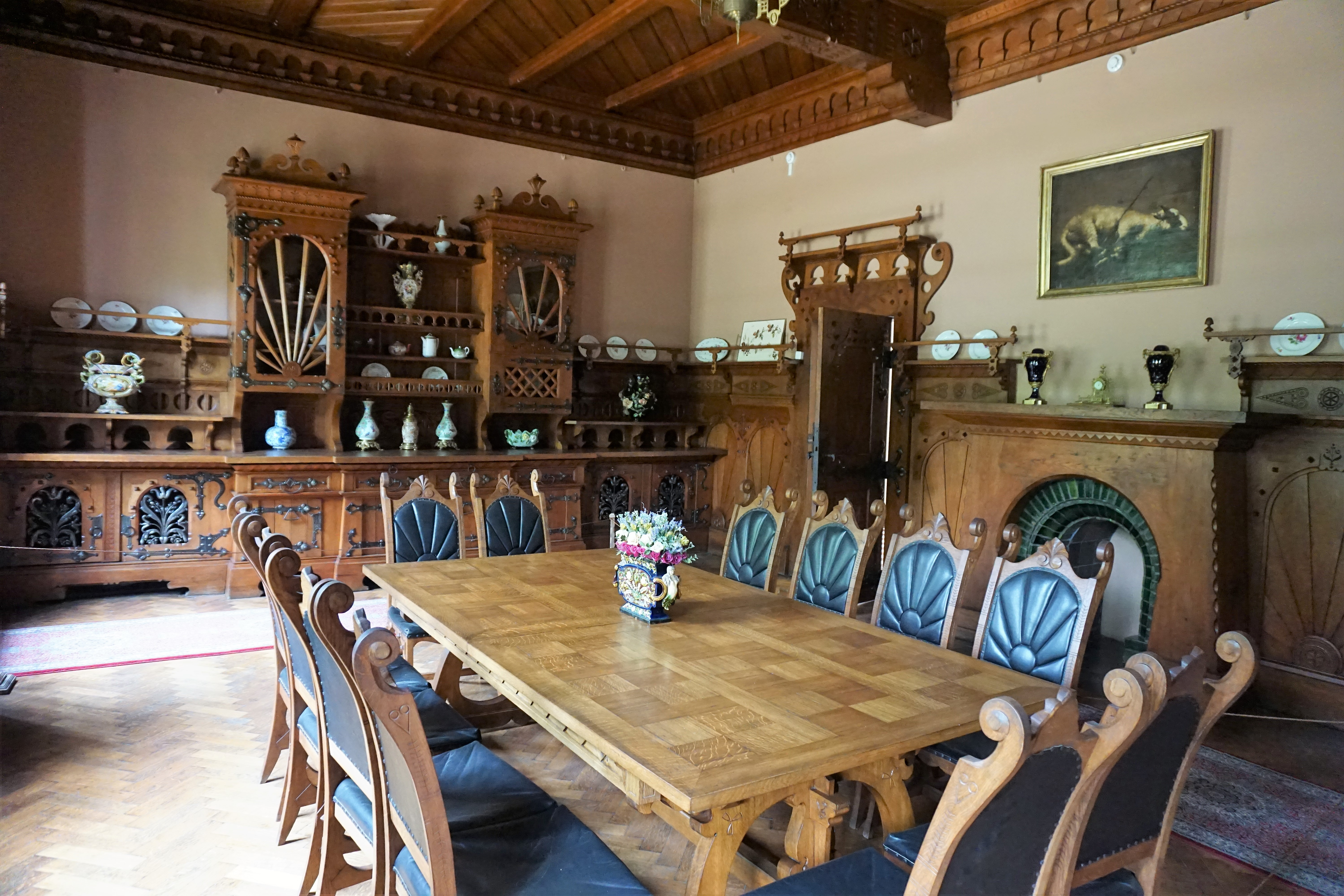
Zakopane-style Dining room

After Tyzenhauzes, the estate became the residence of the Przeździecki family who owned the estate until World War II. In 1905, Jan Przeździecki (1877–1944), the last owner of the manor and the grandson of Maria Tyzenhauz-Przeździecka, began the remodelling of the manor house. During his time, the original Zakopane Style dining room and the bright and high concert hall were decorated with works of fine art collected by the families who ruled the estate – the Counts Tyzenhauz and later Przeździecki. The collection included canvases by Titian, Caravaggio, Rubens, Bruegel, Adriaen van Ostade and other famous painters of Western Europe. The manor had an excellent collection of musical instruments, including works by Stradivarius, Groblicz, and Dankworth.

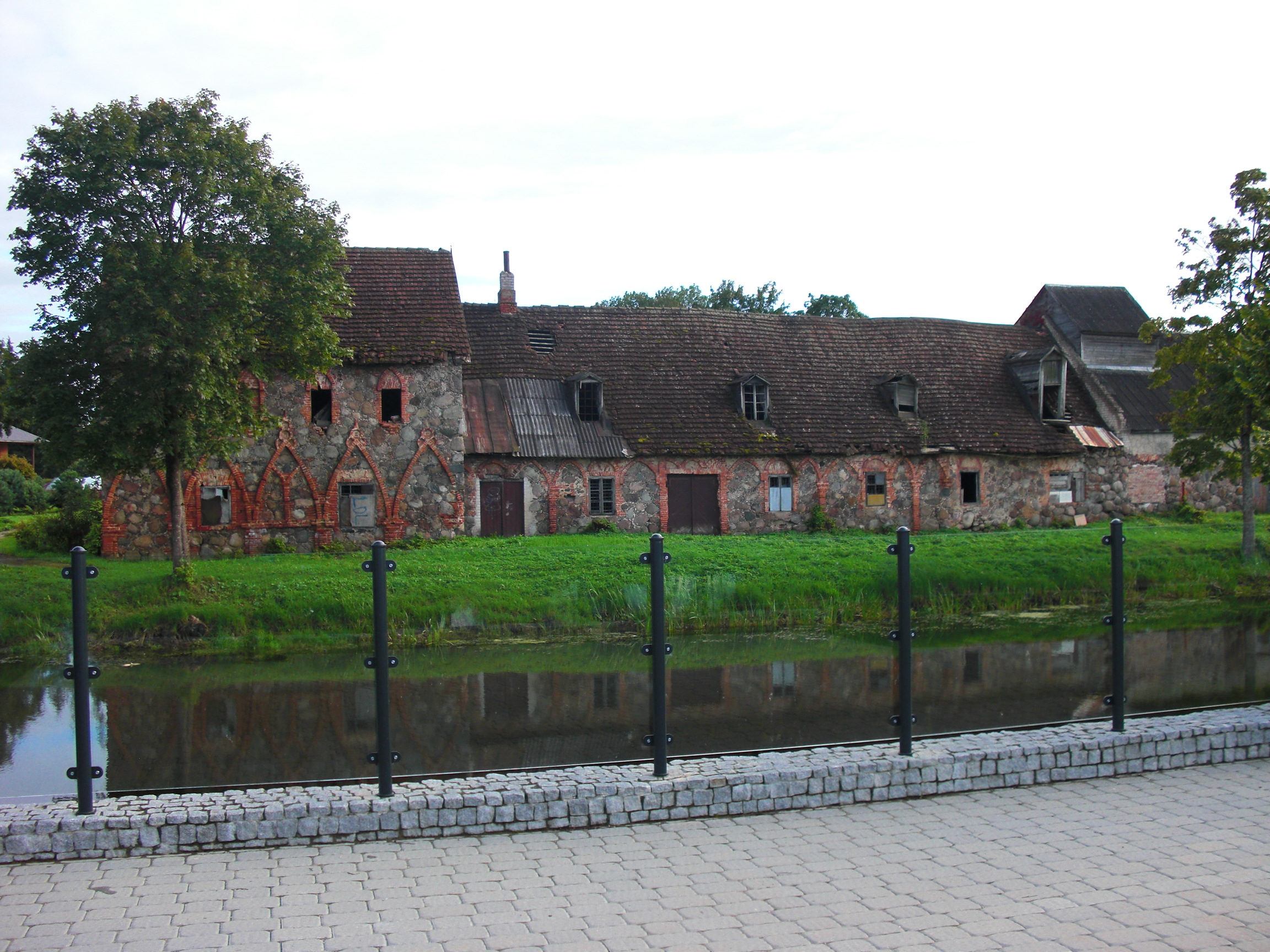
Krošinskiai Castle built on the foundation of the old manor house

When the Soviets occupied Lithuania in 1940, the Rokiškis Manor and many of its valuables were nationalised. Jonas Pšezdzieckis and his wife Hermancja née Sapieha had to secretly flee, leaving all their belongings behind, as they probably did not think that they were leaving Rokiškis forever. Later the Rokiškis Manor was severely damaged. The palace was looted and vandalised by the Red Army. During that time Rokiškis Regional Museum was operating on the premises of the manor house, sharing it with the Soviet army garrison which used the manor as headquarters. On 15 June 1940, Petras Bliūdzius the curator of the museum, together with his whole family was arrested by the Soviets and deported to Siberia after he tried to save the works of art in the manor. In 1941 the manor was captured by the Wehrmacht and the museum was closed.

In the Post-war years, the manor estate was transferred to the Rokiškis Sovkhoz a state-owned farm, and later the manor housed a library and a museum. The manor and adjacent buildings were still inhabited by people who had lived here since the time of the Przeździeckis, others who had sought work after the war, and war refugees. The manor house had become almost dilapidated and was in need of major repairs. Water was leaking through the roof and ceiling. The more spacious rooms had become grain storage, and other rooms housed people. The ceiling collapsed and the attic caved in. The Rokiškis Sovkhoz, which owned the manor, did not undertake repairs, as they did not get the approval of the Soviet government in Moscow.

After Lithuania regained its independence restoration works started in Rokiskis Manor at the end of the 20th century.

=== Recent history ===
Currently, the museum exhibits the works of the Lithuanian woodcarver Lionginas Šepka (1907–1985), paintings by Monika Bičiūnienė (1910–2009), a collection of musical instruments, restored original interior, paintings and other works of art with the only preserved collection of Count's clothes in the Baltic States.

In 2011 Rokiškis Manor became a winner in the Tourism and Regeneration of Physical Sites category by EU's project EDEN.

== Bibliography ==
- Wolff, Józef (1895). Kniaziowie litewsko-ruscy od końca czternastego wieku [The Lithuanian-Ruthenian Princes since the end of the 14th century] (in Polish). Warsaw: Gebethner i Wolff. p. 327.
