= Salos =

- Town
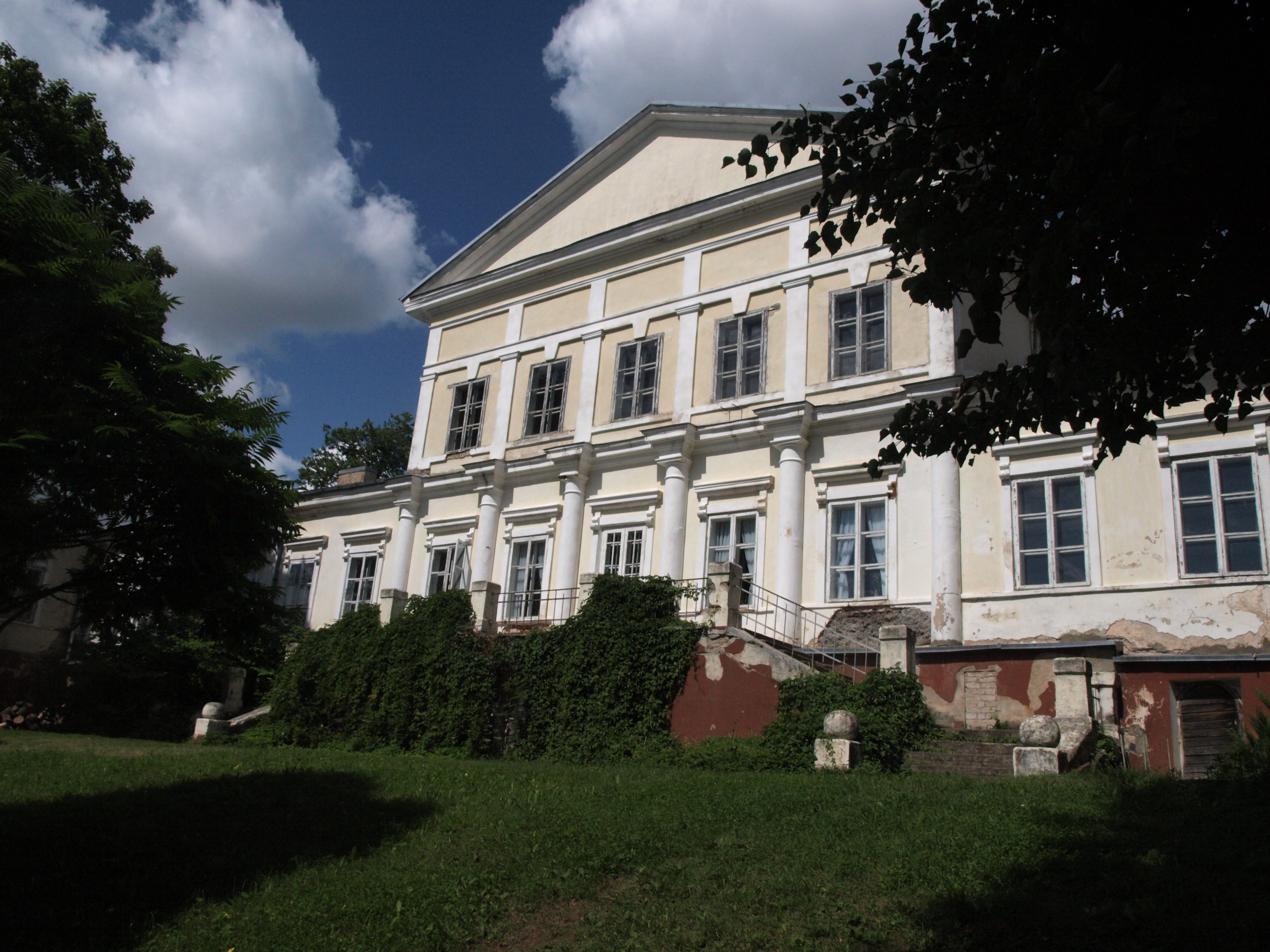
- Salos Manor

- Location within Lithuania
- Coordinates: 55°48′50″N 25°22′10″E
- Country: Lithuania
- County: Panevėžys County

Population (2011)
  - Total: 152
- Time zone: UTC+2 (EET)
  - Summer (DST): UTC+3 (EEST)

Salos is a small town in Panevėžys County, in northeastern Lithuania. According to the 2011 census, the town has a population of 152 people.
