= Church of St. Matthew the Apostle and Evangelist, Rokiškis =

Roman Catholic church in Rokiškis, Lithuania built in 1877

Church of St. Matthew the Apostle and Evangelist
- Šv. apaštalo evangelisto Mato bažnyčia
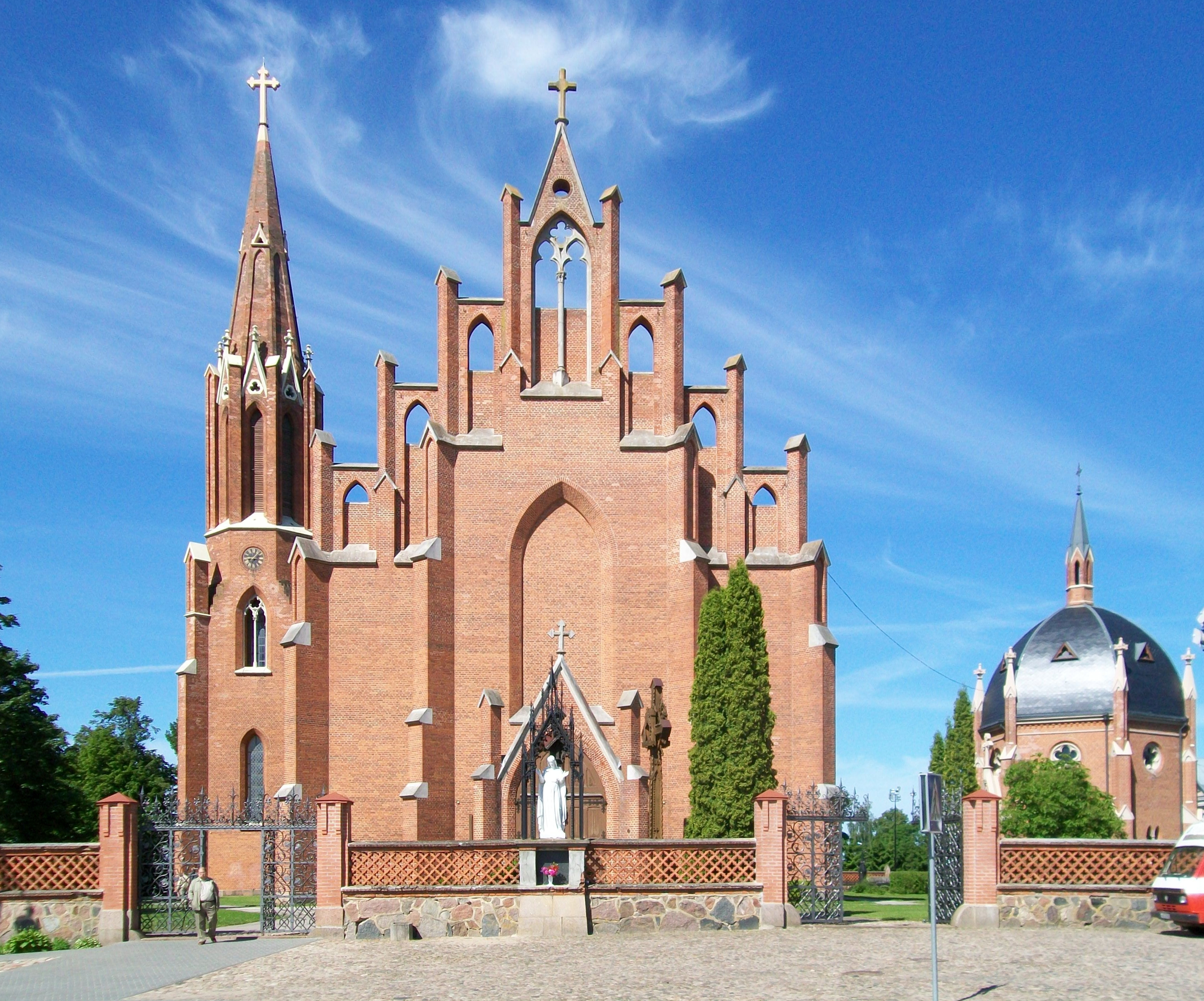
- Façade of the church in 2009

Religion
- Affiliation: Roman Catholic
- Leadership: Roman Catholic Diocese of Panevėžys
- Year consecrated: 1885

Location
- Location: Rokiškis, Lithuania
- Interactive map of Church of St. Matthew the Apostle and Evangelist
- Coordinates: 55°57′50.76″N 25°35′0.96″E

Architecture
- Architect: Georg Werner
- Type: Church
- Style: Gothic Revival architecture
- Completed: 1885
- Construction cost: ~1 million rubles
- Spire height: 56,5 meters

Website
- Rokiskioparapija.lt

The Church of St. Matthew the Apostle and Evangelist (Lithuanian: Šv. apaštalo evangelisto Mato bažnyčia) is a Roman Catholic church in Rokiškis, Lithuania. The construction of the church began in 1866 with the funding by count Rajnold Tyzenhauz and his sister Maria and was completed in 1885. The church has 150 objects treasury, part of which are exhibited in the museum in Rokiškis.

== Gallery ==
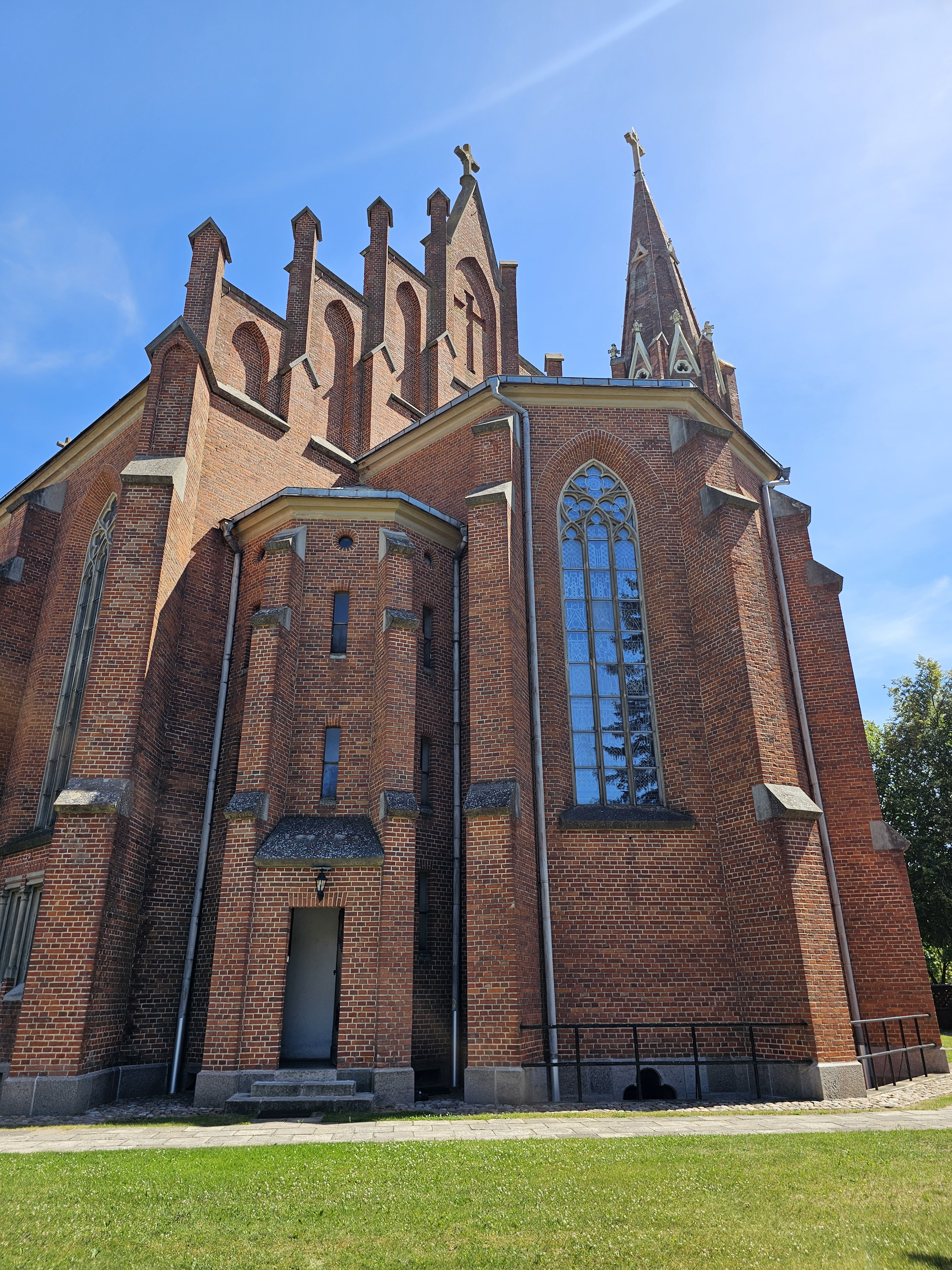
Back-view of the church

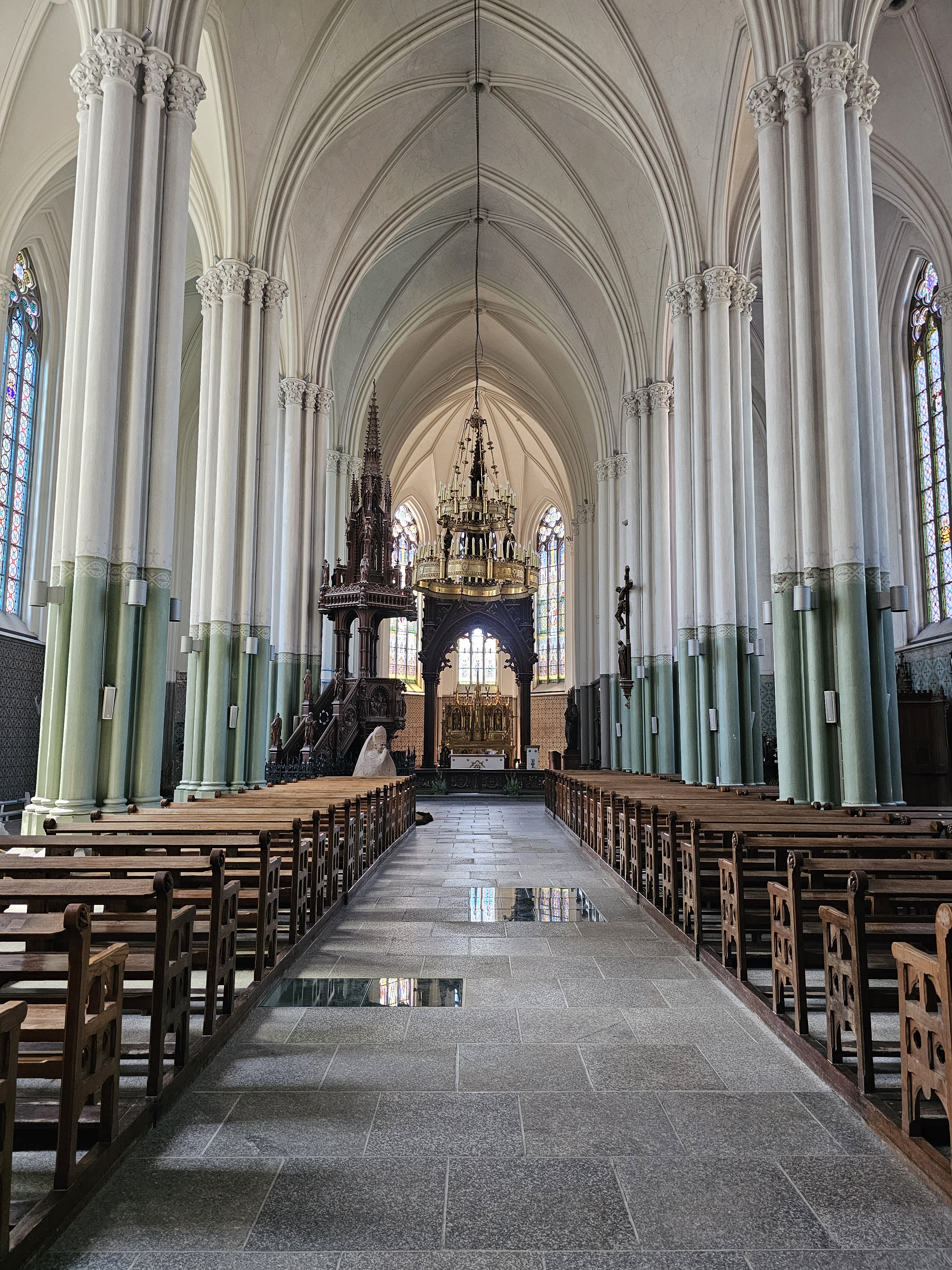
Interior looking towards the main altar

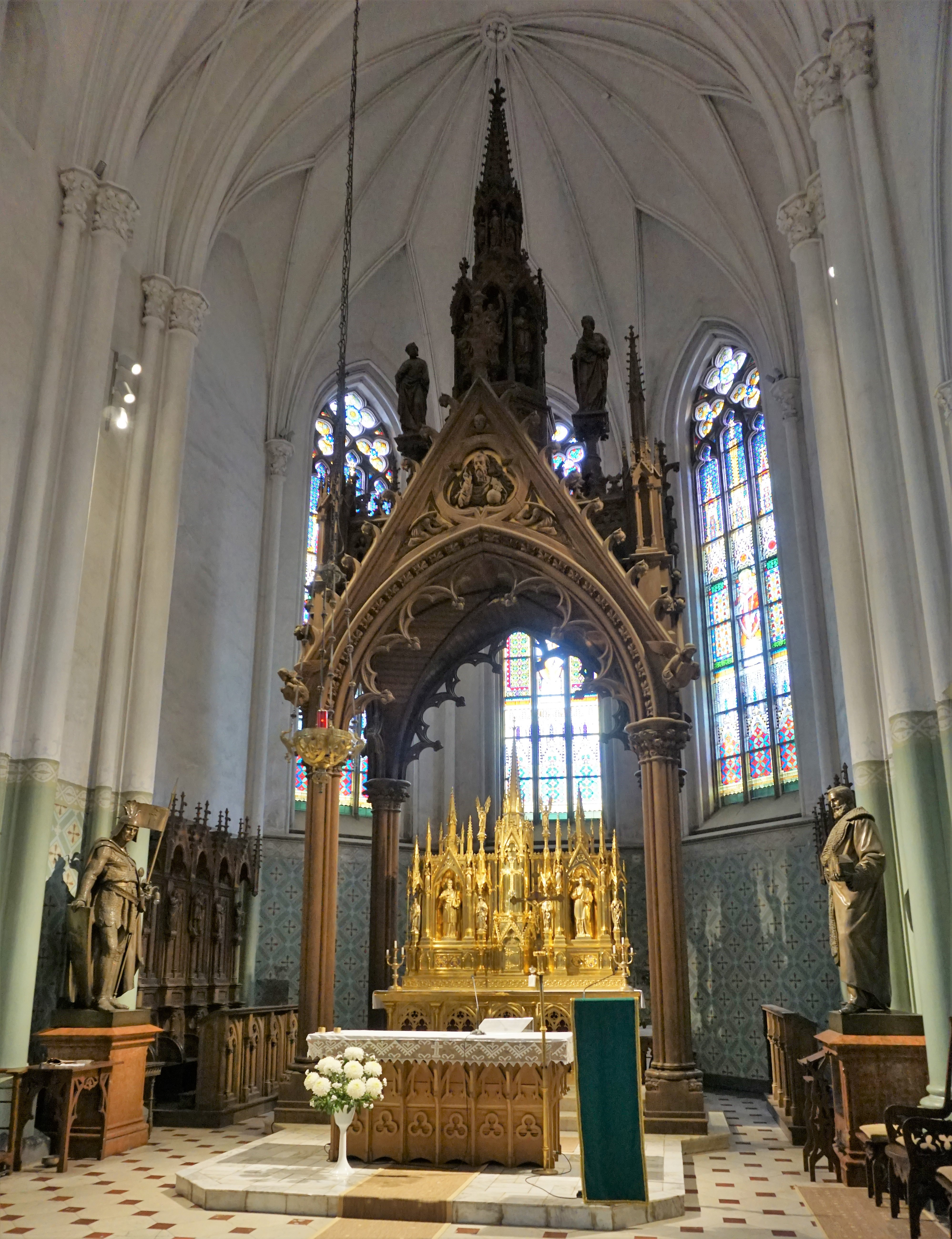
Central altar

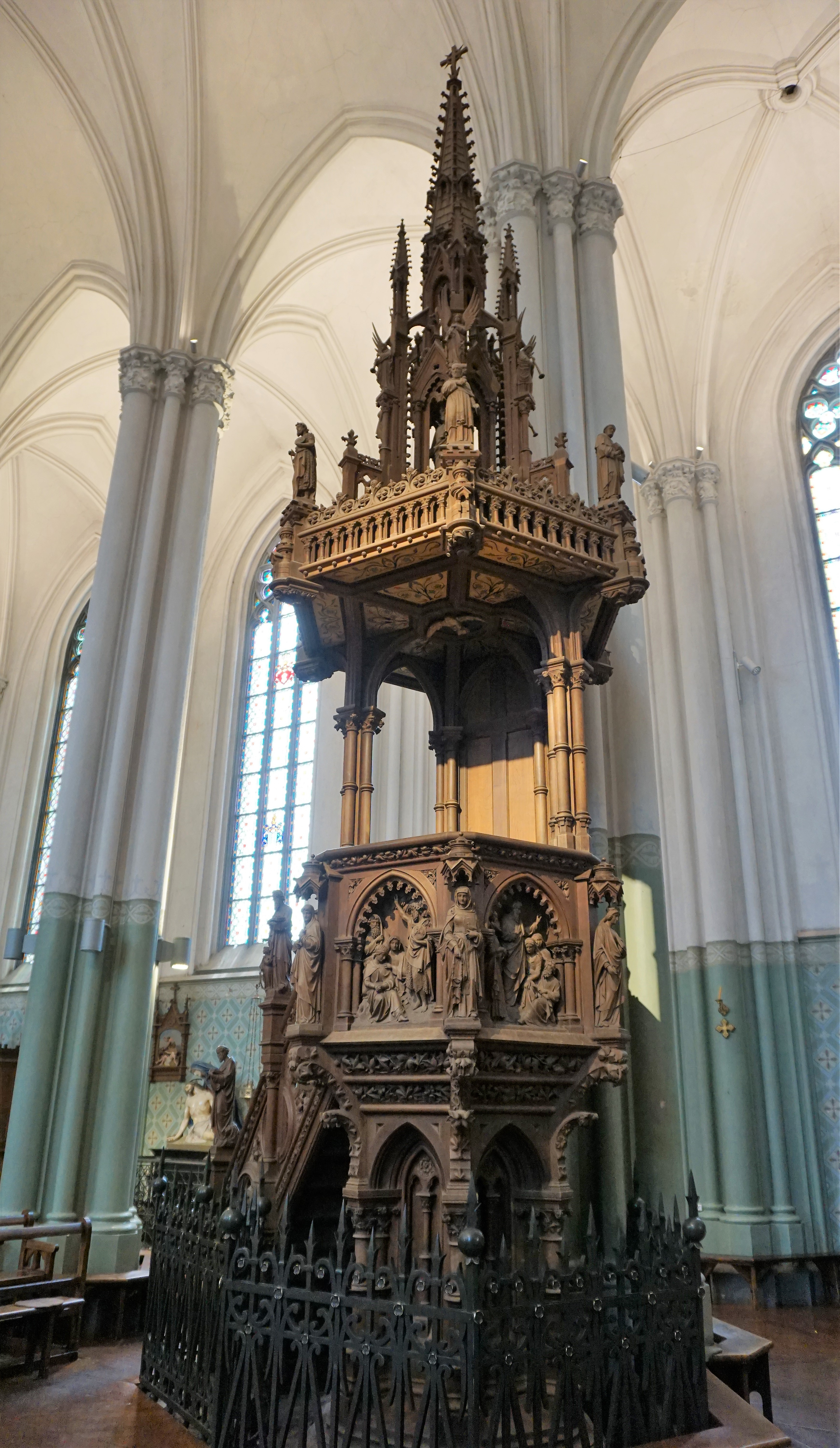
Pulpit

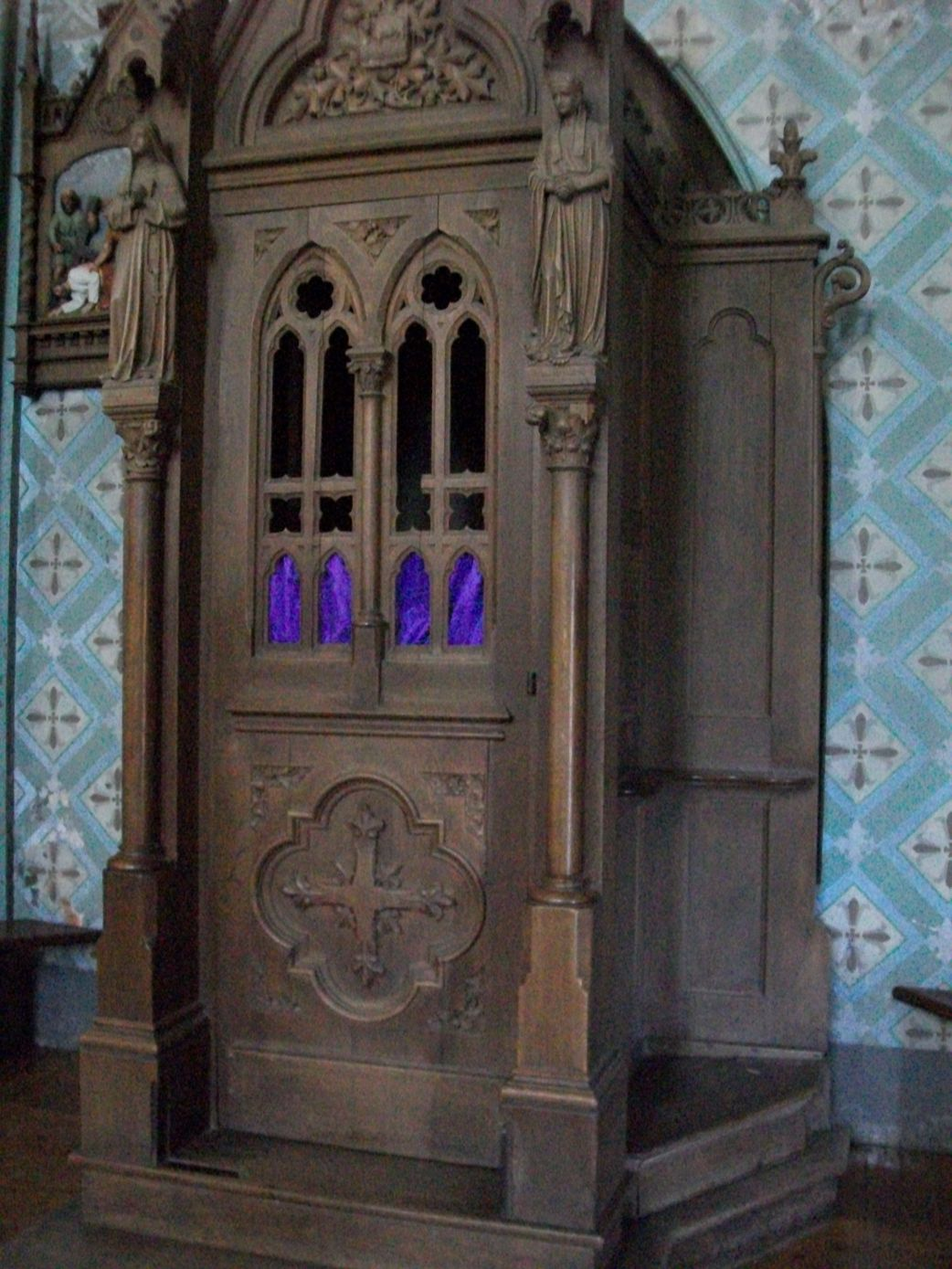
Confessional

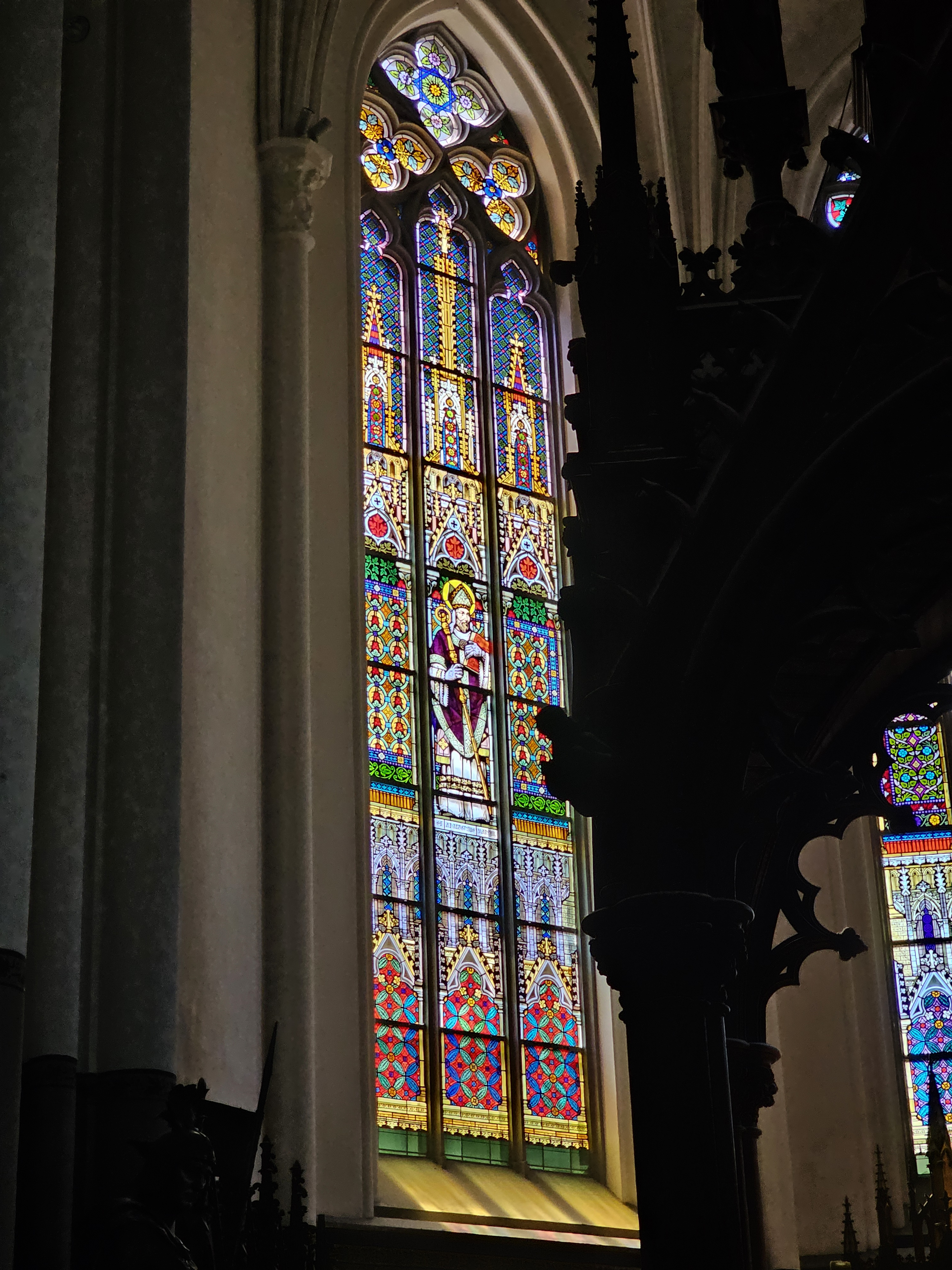
Stained glass windows

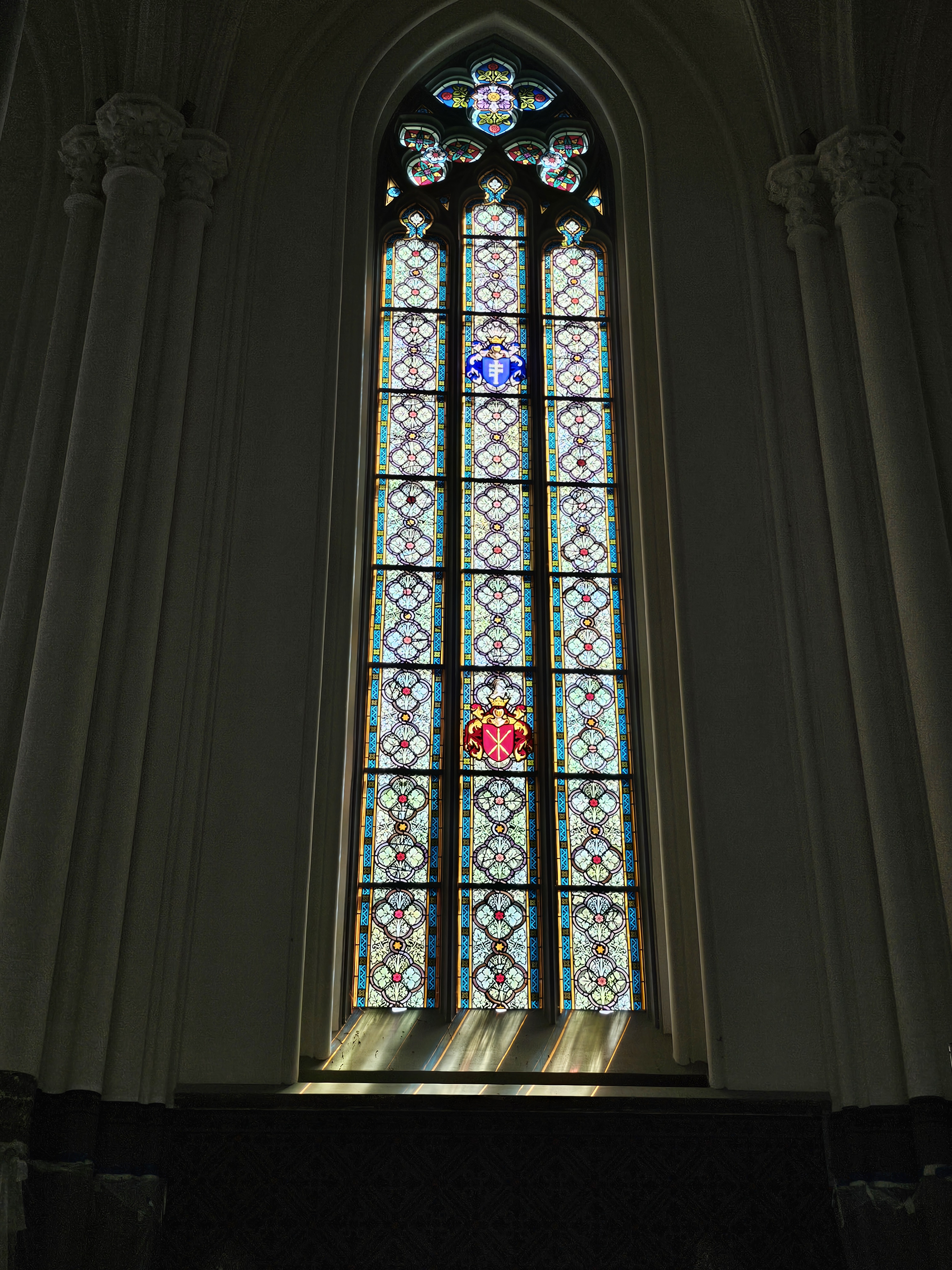
Stained glass windows

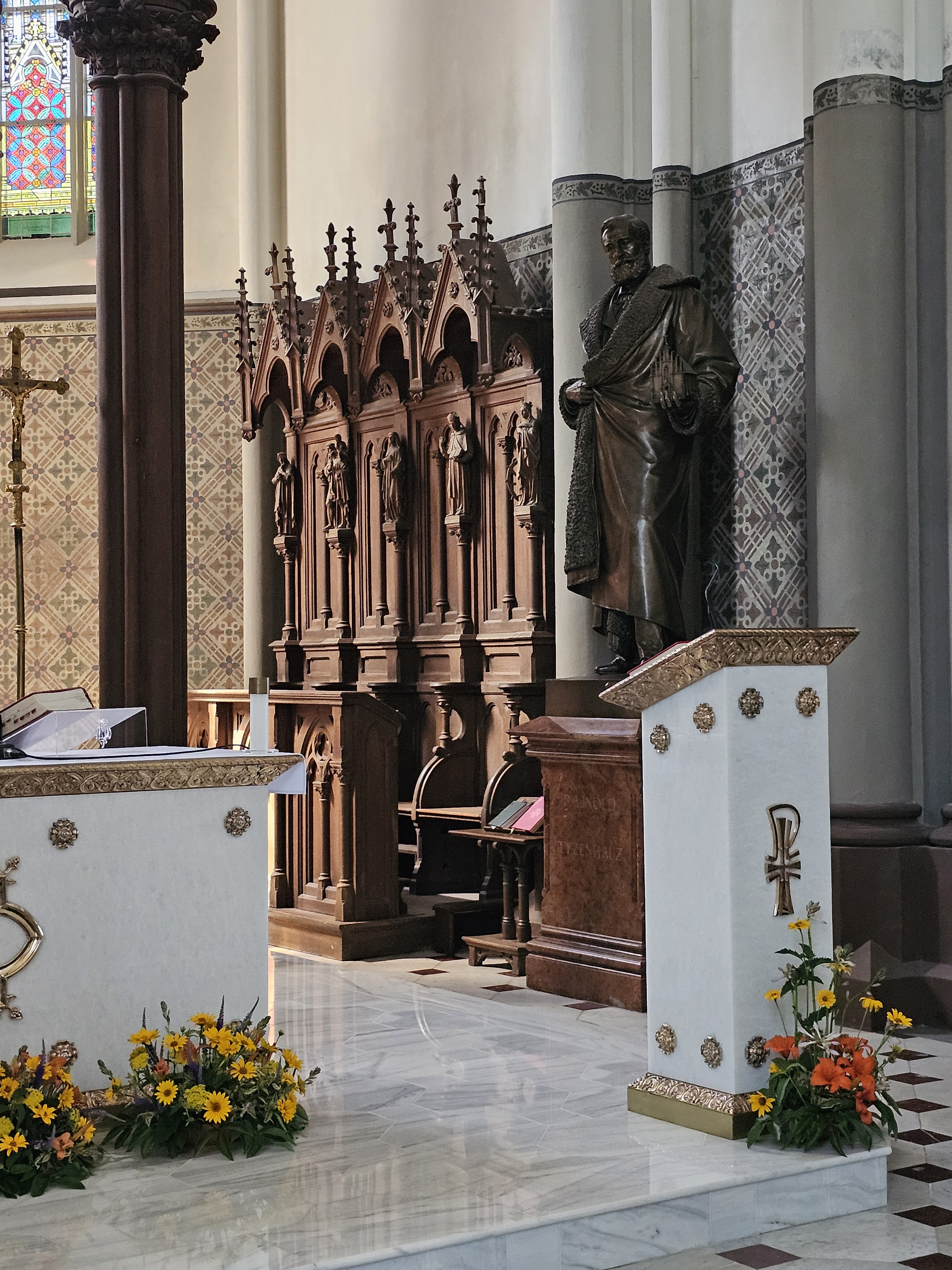
Interior details
