= Daiva Jodeikaitė =

Soviet and Lithuanian basketball player (born 1966)

Personal information
- Born: April 1, 1966 (age 60) Rokiškis, Lithuanian SSR, Soviet Union
- Listed height: 1.84 m (6 ft 0 in)
- Position: Small forward

Career history
- 1980-1988: Vilniaus Kibirkštis
- 1988-1990: Vilniaus Šviesa
- 1990-2005: ŁKS Łódź

Daiva Jodeikaitė (born 1 April 1966) is a former Soviet and Lithuanian female professional basketball player.
