= Sophie de Choiseul-Gouffier =

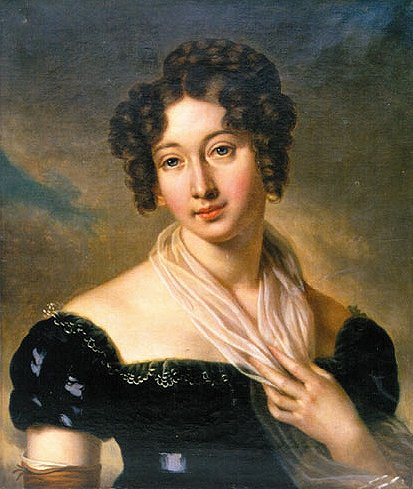
Sophie de Choiseul-Gouffier

Sophie de Choiseul-Gouffier née Zofia Tyzenhauz (Lithuanian: Sofija Tyzenhauzaitė de Šuazel-Gufjė; 1790 – 28 May 1878) was a Polish–Lithuanian novelist, writing in French. She was a daughter of Ignacy Tyzenhauz and Marianna Przezdziecka,. In 1818, she married Antoine Louis Octave de Choiseul-Gouffier, a French count whose father emigrated during the French Revolution and who owned Plateliai manor. She became one of the first female writers in Lithuania, after Ursule Radziwill and Ona Radziwill-Mostowska. Her novels, mostly historical, draw on the lives of women in contemporary Lithuanian nobility. She was buried on cemetery des Champeaux in Montmorency.

== Publications ==
- Le Polonois à St. Domingue ou La jeune Créole, Warsaw, 1818
- Barbe Radziwill. Roman historique, Paris, 1820
- Vladislas Jagellon et Hedwige, ou la réunion de la Lithuanie à la Pologne. Nouvelle historique, Paris, 1824
- Le nain politque. Roman historique, Paris 1827
- Mémoires historiques sur l'empereur Alexandre et la cour de Russie, Paris 1829
- Halina Ogińska ou les Suédois en Pologne, Paris 1839
- Réminiscences sur l'empereur Alexandre Ier et sur l'empereur Napoléon Ier, Paris, 1862
