= Robert Führer =

Czech conductor, composer and organist

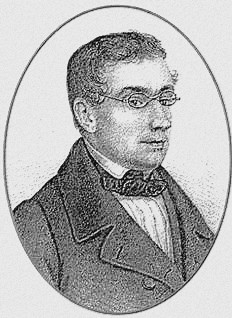
Robert Führer

Robert Jan Nepomuk Führer (2 June 1807 – 28 November 1861) was a Czech composer.

== Biography ==
Born in Prague, he became the Director of Music at St. Vitus Cathedral at the age of 32. Despite his considerable artistic gifts, he lived beyond his means. To support his extravagant lifestyle he sold a valuable Stradivarius violin which was owned by the cathedral. This fact was discovered in 1845, when he was dismissed for the crime.

Without a church to call home he wandered through several different towns and villages, but never stayed in any one place for too long. During this period he had to support himself from sales of his church music compositions. Luckily this was successful because his music was well loved.

No other composer's works enjoyed as widespread performance amongst the choirs in South Germany and Austria during the second half of the 19th century. His musical style varies from a composer such as Mozart, and is more in keeping with that of an early Cecilian. Many of his pieces were written for rural choirs, and as a consequence, they were not too musically demanding. In spite of this, larger and more difficult works can be found in his output. Although his material was sometimes judged to not have been "carefully" composed, his talent and experience made him well loved by his public, not least because he had an innate sense for composing a beautiful melodic line.

== Selected works ==
Führer wrote about 400 compositions, among them 2 oratorios, 150 masses, 20 requiems and other works.

Among his most important compositions belong:

- Mass in A major (1843)
- Requiem in G major (1846)
- Christus im Leiden und im Tode (published by Kränzl in Ried)
- Vánoční zpěv (Christmas Song) for soprano (published in 1864)
- Der Landorganist Op. 207 - preludes for organ

Theoretical studies

- Die Tonleitern der Griechen (1847)
- Der Rhythmus oder der musikalische Ebenbau (1847)
- Generalbaß-Lehre (1855)
- Musikalisches-liturgisches Handbuch (Musical-Liturgical Handbook)
- Praktický návod, jak psáti skladby pro varhany (Practical Instruction, How to Write the Compositions for Organ)

He tried to pass Franz Schubert's Mass No. 2 off as his own.
