= Dankworth =

Dankworth is a surname. Notable people with the surname include:

- Alec Dankworth (born 1960), English jazz bassist and composer, son of Cleo Laine and John Dankworth
- Avril Dankworth (1922–2013), English music educator, sister of John Dankworth and sister-in-law of Cleo Laine
- Jacqui Dankworth (born 1963), English jazz singer. daughter of Cleo Laine and John Dankworth
- John Dankworth (1927–2010), English composer, saxophonist and clarinetist, husband of Cleo Laine
