= Tyzenhauz =

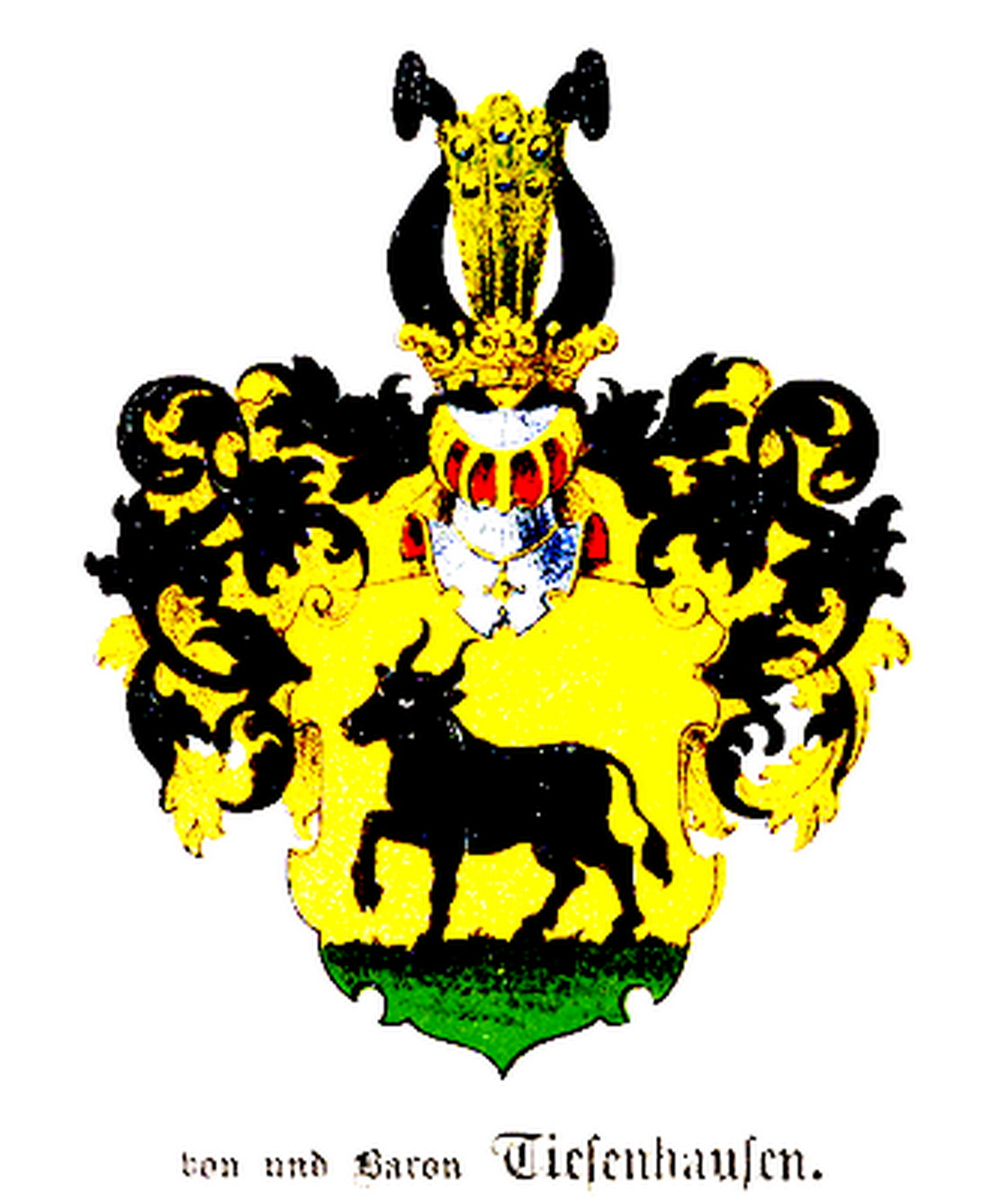
Coat of arms of the Tyzenhauz family

The Tyzenhauz family (Polish: Tyzenhauz, German: Tiesenhausen, Lithuanian: Tyzenhauzai, Belarusian: Тызенгаўз) was a noble family of the Polish–Lithuanian Commonwealth of German extraction. It was active in the Duchy of Livonia, Duchy of Courland and the northern Grand Duchy of Lithuania. Among the best-known members of the family were Gothard Jan Tyzenhauz, the Voivode of Dorpat (1634–1640), Konstanty Tyzenhauz (1786–1853), ornithologist, and Antoni Tyzenhauz (1733–1785), the manager of royal property during the reign of Stanisław August Poniatowski. Antoni built Tyzenhauz Palace in Vilnius, Lithuania. In Rokiškis, northern Lithuania, the family also built the neogothic church of St. Matthias and Rokiškis Manor, which now houses Rokiškis Regional Museum.

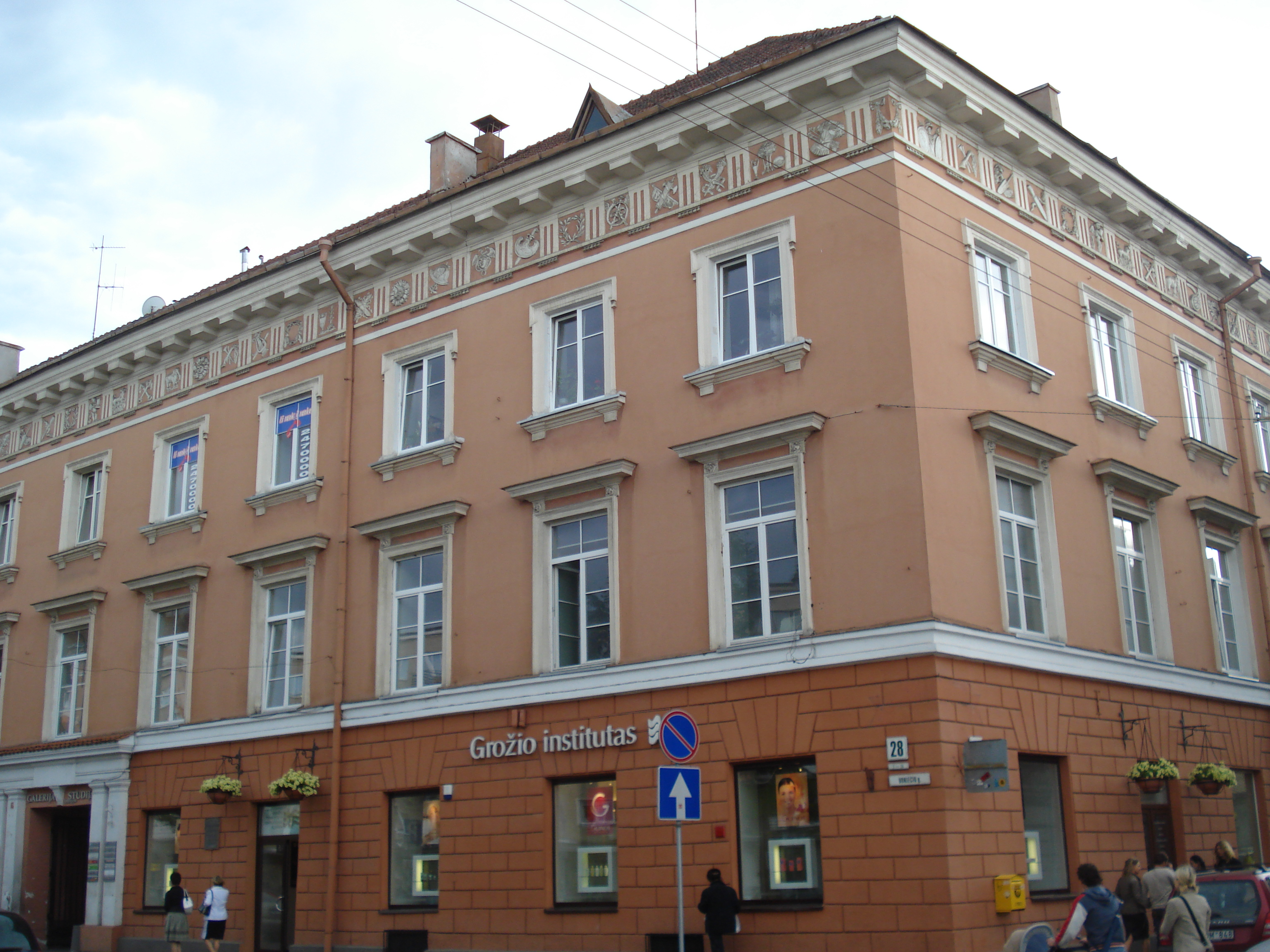
Tyzenhauz palace in Vilnius

This family is a collateral branch of the medievally-originated Baltic German House of Tiesenhausen, which already in the late medieval epoch, held fiefs in Livonia and Estonia. Other branches of that family came to some prominence in Finland, in Sweden and in Imperial Russia.
