= Juozas Tallat-Kelpša =

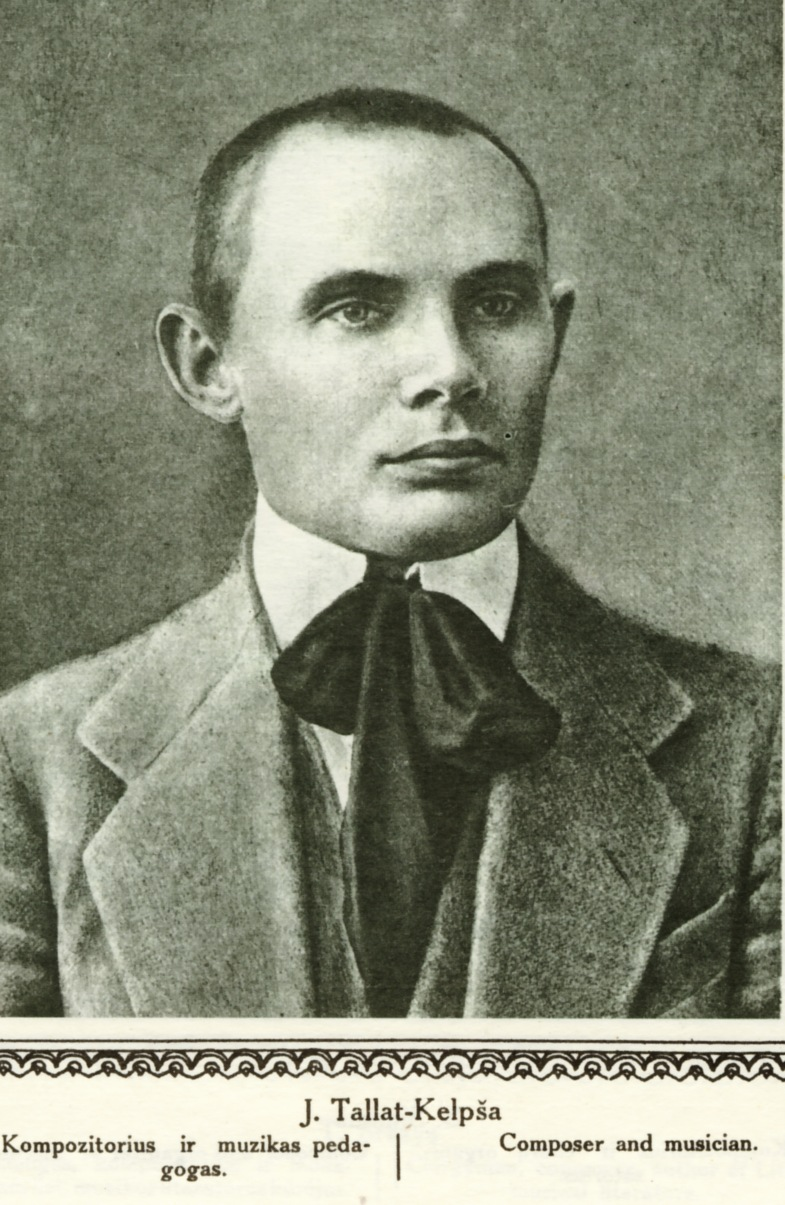
Juozas Tallat-Kelpša, Lithuanian composer, conductor, musician

Juozas Tallat-Kelpša (1889–1949) was a Lithuanian choral director and composer.

== Recordings ==
- "Mano sieloj šiandien šventė" (Today is a holiday for my soul) Skalvas' aria (soprano) from the opera Vilmantė 1941
