= Central and Western Lithuania Region =

Coordinates: 55°22′36″N 23°30′15″E

Central and Western Lithuania Region Vidurio ir vakarų Lietuvos regionas (Lithuanian)
- Region
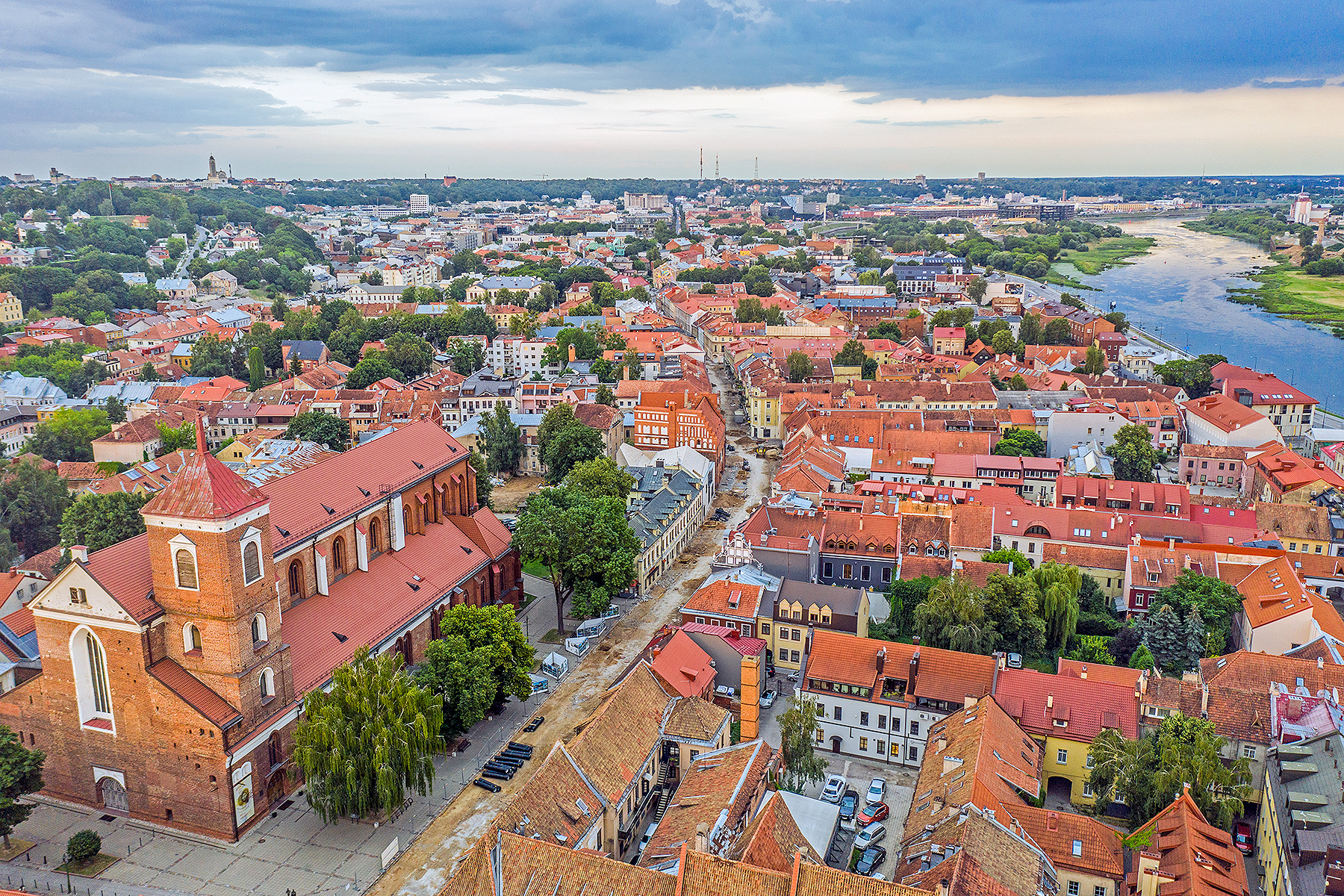
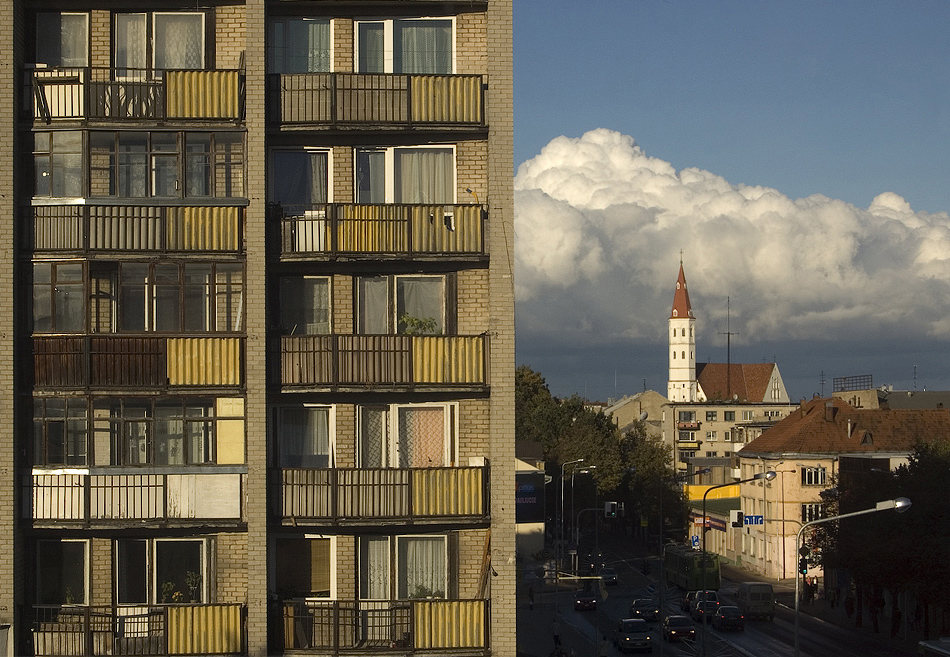
- From top, left to right: Kaunas, the largest city in the region with over 300,000 inhabitants, Klaipėda, the second largest city in the region, Šiauliai, the third largest city in the region with over 100,000 inhabitants

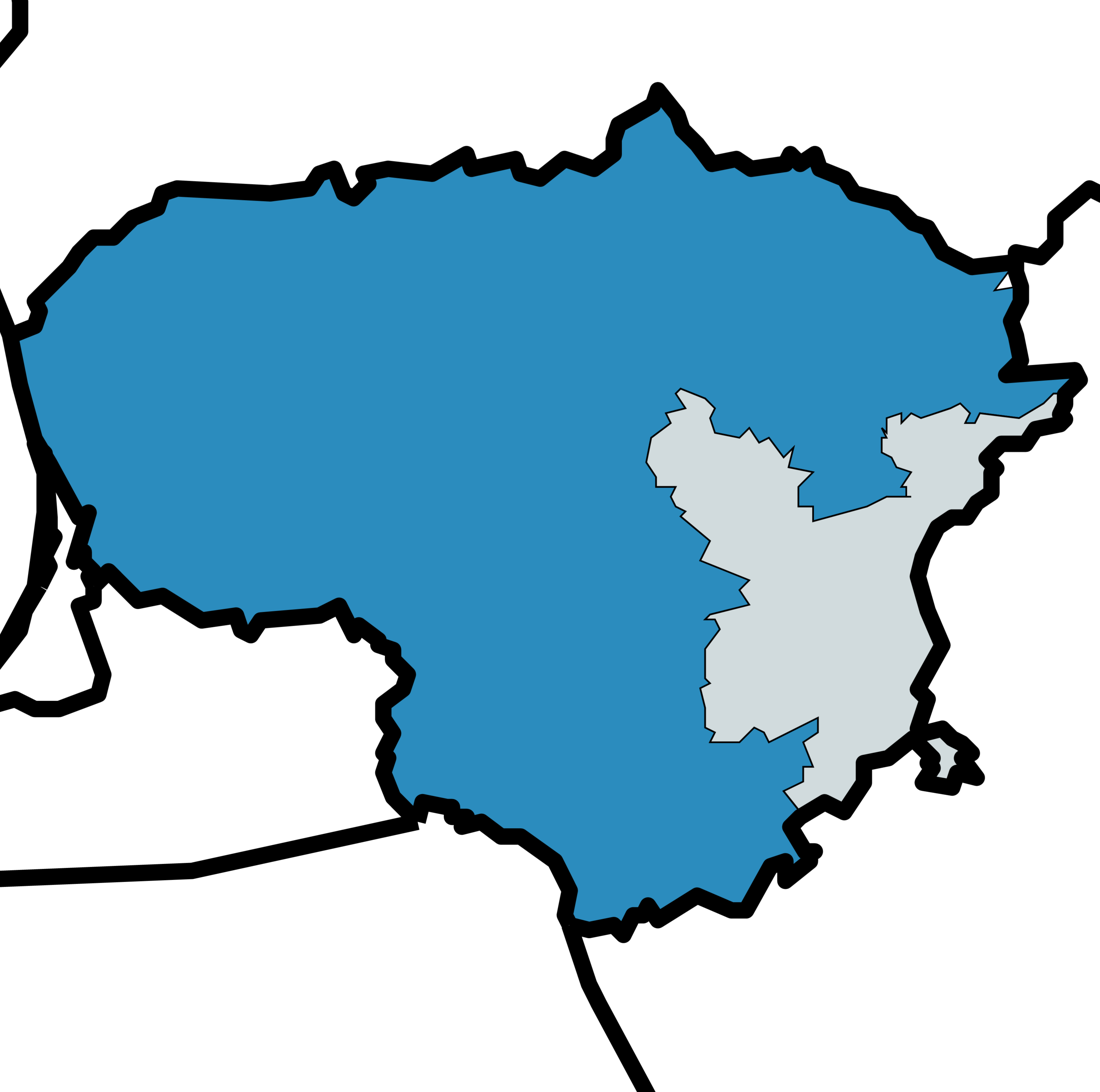
- Central and Western Lithuania Region (in blue)
- Country: Lithuania

Area
  - Total: 55,556 km^{2} (21,450 sq mi)

Population (2023)
  - Total: 2,017,640
  - Density: 36.317/km^{2} (94.061/sq mi)

GDP
  - Total: €42.822 billion (2024)
  - Per capita: €21,273 (2023)

Central and Western Lithuania Region (Lithuanian: Vidurio ir vakarų Lietuvos regionas) is a subdivision of Lithuania as defined by the Nomenclature of Territorial Units for Statistics (NUTS). It is one of the two classified NUTS-2 statistical regions of Lithuania. The region encompasses an area of 55,556 km^{2} (21,450 sq mi) and incorporates nine counties of Lithuania except the Vilnius County. With a population of just over two million, it is the most populated of the two regions in Lithuania. Kaunas is the largest city in the region.

== Classification ==
The country of Lithuania is organized into ten counties for administrative purposes by the amendments of Act XXI of 1996. The Nomenclature of Territorial Units for Statistics (NUTS) organizes the country into two broader level sub-divisions. These are classified as a NUTS-2 statistical regions of Lithuania, and incorporate one or more counties within it. The new delimination was announced by the Parliament of Lithuania in 2016, and approved by European Parliament on 21 November 2016. The counties form the NUTS-3 territorial units under them.

== Geography ==
Central and Western Lithuania Region incorporates an area of 55,556 km^{2} (21,450 sq mi). The region is located in Eastern Europe, and bordered by the Baltic Sea to the west. It shares international land borders with Latvia in the north, Belarus in the south-east, Poland in the south, and Kaliningrad of Russia in the south-west. The region has about 97 km (60 mi) of coastline of which 37 km (23 mi) face the Baltic Sea and the rest lies along the narrow mouth of the Curonian Lagoon extending south to Kaliningrad. The Nemunas River enters the region from Belarus before flowing into the lagoon. The region generally consists of flat terrain except for few highlands in the west. The region consists of numerous small lakes and swamps.

=== Sub-regions ===
Central and Western Lithuania Region incorporates nine counties of Lithuania except the Vilnius County.

#	County (media help)	Capital	Area in km^{2} (rank)	Population (2023)	Pop. density (per km^{2})	GDP (nominal) (billion EUR), 2023	GDP (per capita) (EUR, 2023)	Average monthly net salary (EUR), 2025-Q1	HDI (2022)	Municipalities
1	Alytus County (listen • info)	Alytus	5,418	135,367	25	1.9	14,300	1,232	0.846	Alytus; Alytus (District); Druskininkai; Lazdijai; Varėna
2	Kaunas County (listen • info)	Kaunas	8,086	580,333	70	14.7	25,200	1,427	0.886	Birštonas; Jonava; Kaišiadorys; Kaunas; Kaunas (District); Kėdainiai; Prienai; Raseiniai
3	Klaipėda County (listen • info)	Klaipėda	5,222	336,104	61	7.6	22,500	1,356	0.880	Klaipėda; Klaipėda (District); Kretinga; Neringa; Palanga; Skuodas; Šilutė
4	Marijampolė County (listen • info)	Marijampolė	4,466	135,891	31	1.3	14,800	1,213	0.835	Kalvarija; Kazlų Rūda; Marijampolė; Šakiai; Vilkaviškis
5	Panevėžys County (listen • info)	Panevėžys	7,878	211,652	27	3.8	18,200	1,250	0.850	Biržai; Kupiškis; Panevėžys; Panevėžys (District); Pasvalys; Rokiškis
6	Šiauliai County (listen • info)	Šiauliai	8,537	261,764	31	4.8	18,000	1,242	0.852	Akmenė; Joniškis; Kelmė; Pakruojis; Radviliškis; Šiauliai; Šiauliai (District)
7	Tauragė County (listen • info)	Tauragė	4,349	90,652	21	1.3	14,800	1,252	0.825	Jurbarkas; Pagėgiai; Šilalė; Tauragė
8	Telšiai County (listen • info)	Telšiai	4,350	131,431	30	2.3	17,700	1,291	0.850	Mažeikiai; Plungė; Rietavas; Telšiai
9	Utena County (listen • info)	Utena	7,191	125,462	18	1.8	14,200	1,220	0.837	Anykščiai; Ignalina; Molėtai; Utena; Visaginas; Zarasai

== Economy ==
The gross domestic product (GDP) of the region was €40.2 billion in 2023, accounting for 56% of the Lithuanian economic output.
