= ISO 3166-2:LT =

Entry for Lithuania in ISO 3166-2

ISO 3166-2:LT is the entry for Lithuania in ISO 3166-2, part of the ISO 3166 standard published by the International Organization for Standardization (ISO), which defines codes for the names of the principal subdivisions (e.g., provinces or states) of all countries coded in ISO 3166-1.

Currently for Lithuania, ISO 3166-2 codes are defined for ten counties, seven city municipalities, 44 district municipalities and nine municipalities.

Each code consists of two parts separated by a hyphen. The first part is LT, the ISO 3166-1 alpha-2 code of Lithuania. The second part is either of the following:

- two letters: counties
- two digits: city municipalities, district municipalities and municipalities

== Current codes ==
Subdivision names are listed as in the ISO 3166-2 standard published by the ISO 3166 Maintenance Agency (ISO 3166/MA).

=== Counties ===
Ten counties are defined in the ISO 3166-2:LT standard:

Click on the button in the header to sort each column.

Code	Subdivision name (lt)	Subdivision name (en) (Note: For reference only, English name not included in the ISO 3166-2 standard.)
LT-AL	Alytaus apskritis	Alytus County
LT-KU	Kauno apskritis	Kaunas County
LT-KL	Klaipėdos apskritis	Klaipėda County
LT-MR	Marijampolės apskritis	Marijampolė County
LT-PN	Panevėžio apskritis	Panevėžys County
LT-SA	Šiaulių apskritis	Šiauliai County
LT-TA	Tauragės apskritis	Tauragė County
LT-TE	Telšių apskritis	Telšiai County
LT-UT	Utenos apskritis	Utena County
LT-VL	Vilniaus apskritis	Vilnius County

=== Municipalities ===
Codes for 60 municipalities are defined in the ISO 3166-2:LT standard:

Click on the button in the header to sort each column.

Code	Subdivision name (lt)	Subdivision category	Parent subdivision
LT-01	Akmenė	district municipality	SA
LT-02	Alytaus miestas	city municipality	AL
LT-03	Alytus	district municipality	AL
LT-04	Anykščiai	district municipality	UT
LT-05	Birštonas	municipality	KU
LT-06	Biržai	district municipality	PN
LT-07	Druskininkai	municipality	AL
LT-08	Elektrėnai	municipality	VL
LT-09	Ignalina	district municipality	UT
LT-10	Jonava	district municipality	KU
LT-11	Joniškis	district municipality	SA
LT-12	Jurbarkas	district municipality	TA
LT-13	Kaišiadorys	district municipality	KU
LT-14	Kalvarija	municipality	MR
LT-16	Kaunas	district municipality	KU
LT-15	Kauno miestas	city municipality	KU
LT-17	Kazlų Rūdos	municipality	MR
LT-18	Kėdainiai	district municipality	KU
LT-19	Kelmė	district municipality	SA
LT-21	Klaipėda	district municipality	KL
LT-20	Klaipėdos miestas	city municipality	KL
LT-22	Kretinga	district municipality	KL
LT-23	Kupiškis	district municipality	PN
LT-24	Lazdijai	district municipality	AL
LT-25	Marijampolė	district municipality	MR
LT-26	Mažeikiai	district municipality	TE
LT-27	Molėtai	district municipality	UT
LT-28	Neringa	municipality	KL
LT-29	Pagėgiai	municipality	TA
LT-30	Pakruojis	district municipality	SA
LT-31	Palangos miestas	city municipality	KL
LT-32	Panevėžio miestas	city municipality	PN
LT-33	Panevėžys	district municipality	PN
LT-34	Pasvalys	district municipality	PN
LT-35	Plungė	district municipality	TE
LT-36	Prienai	district municipality	KU
LT-37	Radviliškis	district municipality	SA
LT-38	Raseiniai	district municipality	KU
LT-39	Rietavas	municipality	TE
LT-40	Rokiškis	district municipality	PN
LT-41	Šakiai	district municipality	MR
LT-42	Šalčininkai	district municipality	VL
LT-44	Šiauliai	district municipality	SA
LT-43	Šiaulių miestas	city municipality	SA
LT-45	Šilalė	district municipality	TA
LT-46	Šilutė	district municipality	KL
LT-47	Širvintos	district municipality	VL
LT-48	Skuodas	district municipality	KL
LT-49	Švenčionys	district municipality	VL
LT-50	Tauragė	district municipality	TA
LT-51	Telšiai	district municipality	TE
LT-52	Trakai	district municipality	VL
LT-53	Ukmergė	district municipality	VL
LT-54	Utena	district municipality	UT
LT-55	Varėna	district municipality	AL
LT-56	Vilkaviškis	district municipality	MR
LT-57	Vilniaus miestas	city municipality	VL
LT-58	Vilnius	district municipality	VL
LT-59	Visaginas	municipality	UT
LT-60	Zarasai	district municipality	UT

== Changes ==
The following changes have been announced by the ISO 3166/MA on the Online Browsing Platform (OBP):

Date issued	Description of change in newsletter	Code/Subdivision change
2014-10-31	Addition of 7 city municipalities, 44 district municipalities, and 9 municipalities	
2021-11-25	Change of spelling of LT-05, LT-14, LT-39; Assign parent subdivision to LT-01 through LT-60; Update List Source	Subdivisions renamed: LT-05 Birštono → Birštonas; LT-14 Kalvarijos → Kalvarija; LT-39 Rietavo → Rietavas

== See also ==
- Subdivisions of Lithuania
- FIPS region codes of Lithuania
- NUTS codes of Lithuania
- Neighbouring countries: BY, LV, PL, RU
