= Antupė =

- Village
- Location within Lithuania
- Coordinates: 56.399°N 24.838°E
- Country: Lithuania
- County: Panevėžys County

Population
  - Total: 14
- Time zone: Eastern European Time (UTC+2)
  - Summer (DST): Eastern European Summer Time (UTC+3)

Antupė is a village in Nemunėlio Radviliškis Eldership, Biržai District Municipality, Panevėžys County, Lithuania. The village covers an area of some 144 ha (356 acres), and its population was 14 in 2011. It is served by a mobile library service.
