= Grincagalė =

- Village
- Location within Lithuania
- Coordinates: 55.957°N 24.991°E
- Country: Lithuania
- County: Panevėžys County

Population
  - Total: 4
- Time zone: Eastern European Time (UTC+2)
  - Summer (DST): Eastern European Summer Time (UTC+3)

Grincagalė is a village in Kupiškis District Municipality, Panevėžys County, Lithuania; it covers an area of some 134 ha (331 acres). Its population was 23 in 1979, and 4 in 2011.
