= Juodupė =

- Town
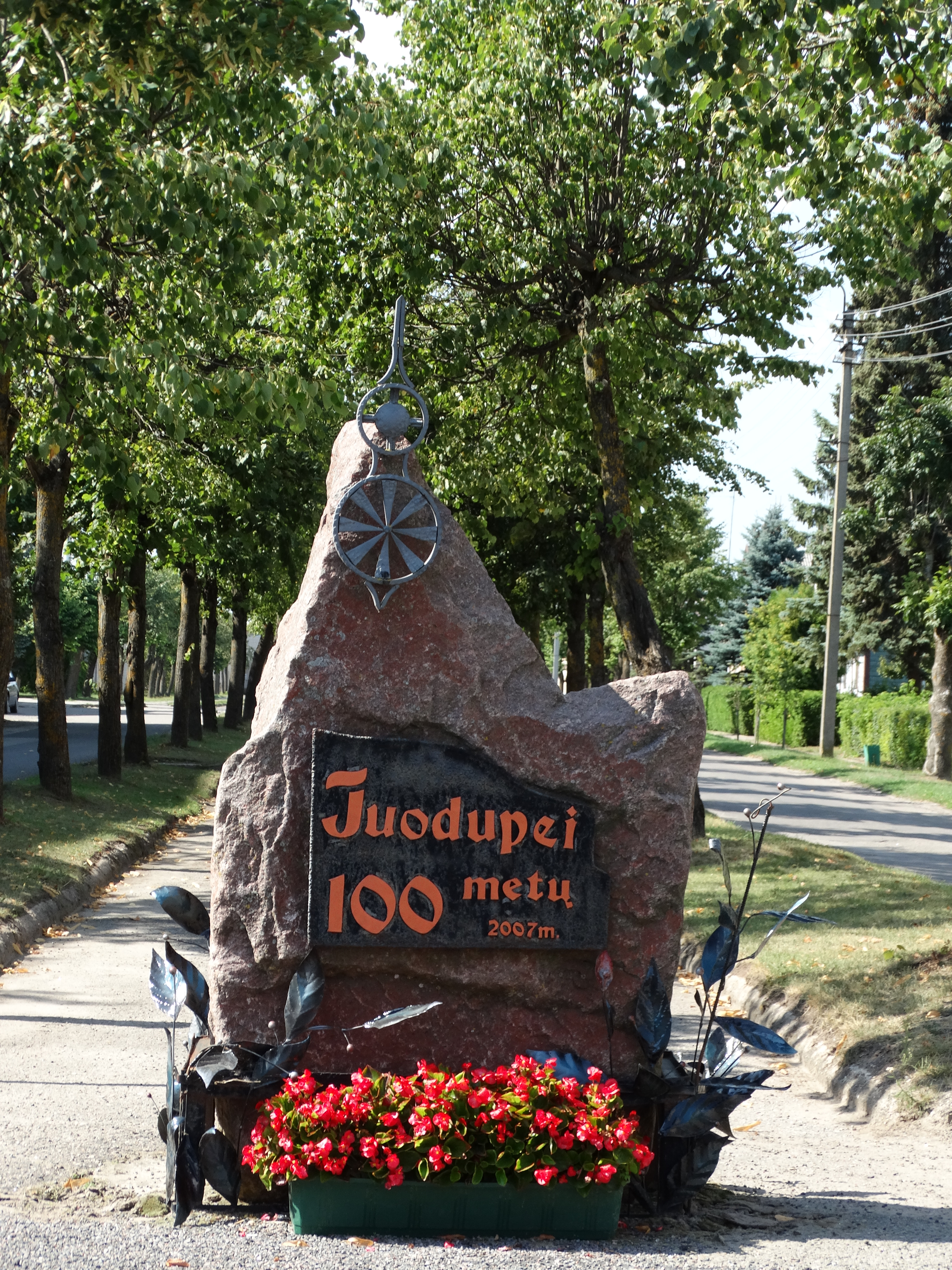
- Memorial for 100 years since the foundation

- Flag Coat of arms

- Location of Juodupė
- Coordinates: 56°05′20″N 25°36′40″E
- Country: Lithuania
- County: Panevėžys County
- Municipality: Rokiškis district municipality
- Eldership: Juodupė Eldership
- Capital of: Juodupė Eldership

Population (2021)
  - Total: 1,549
- Time zone: UTC+2 (EET)
  - Summer (DST): UTC+3 (EEST)

Juodupė (literally: black river) is a town in Rokiškis district municipality, Lithuania. It is located near the confluence of Juodupė rivulet with Vyžuona river, about 6 km. from the border with Latvia. According to the 2011 census, population was 1,769.

== History ==
The place was first mentioned in 1690. A record has been found in the Onuškis Church's 1680-1740 yearbook, which states that in 1690 a boy was baptized in Aknysta, whose baptismal mother was Elena Bučinska (Bučinskaitė) from Juodupe (de Jodupe).

The development of Juodupė began to accelerate after 1907, when the entrepreneur Oskaras Trėjus set up a wool carding and spinning mill in the old mill owned by count Pžezdeckis, and later installed a weaving machine. In 1931 Trėjus went bankrupt and in 1933, the "Nemunas" company bought the mill. At the time it was the only woolen fabric factory in Lithuania. A chapel was built in 1936, and in 1938 Church of Our Lady of the Gate of Dawn was built.

At the beginning of the World War II in 1941, the Red Army killed 13 residents of Juodupė. In 1944, during the heavy fighting between the Soviet and German troops, the town was burnt down.

On 30 July 1944, after the gunfire ceased and the Wehrmacht retreated during the night, the Juodupė church, which had been standing for only six years, caught fire and burned to the ground. The Soviet authorities did not allow the church to be rebuilt on the remaining foundations of the first church. In 1946, a new house of worship was established by converting the barn of the clergy house. It is still used by the people of Juodupė today.

In November 1944, major Lithuanian partisan group were active in the area. In 1945, 23 partisans were killed in Juodupė and 9 houses were burnt down by order of the NKVD.

After World War II, the town recovered, the fabric industry developed rapidly, and on April 2, 1956, the village was fully rebuilt. In 1956, a library was established, and from 1960 onwards a peat company, a post office, a clinic, and a pharmacy were established.

On 16 December 2002, the status of Juodupe was demoted from "city" to "town". In 2006, the coat of arms of Juodupe was adopted by decree of the President of the Republic of Lithuania.
