= Gyvakarai =

- Village
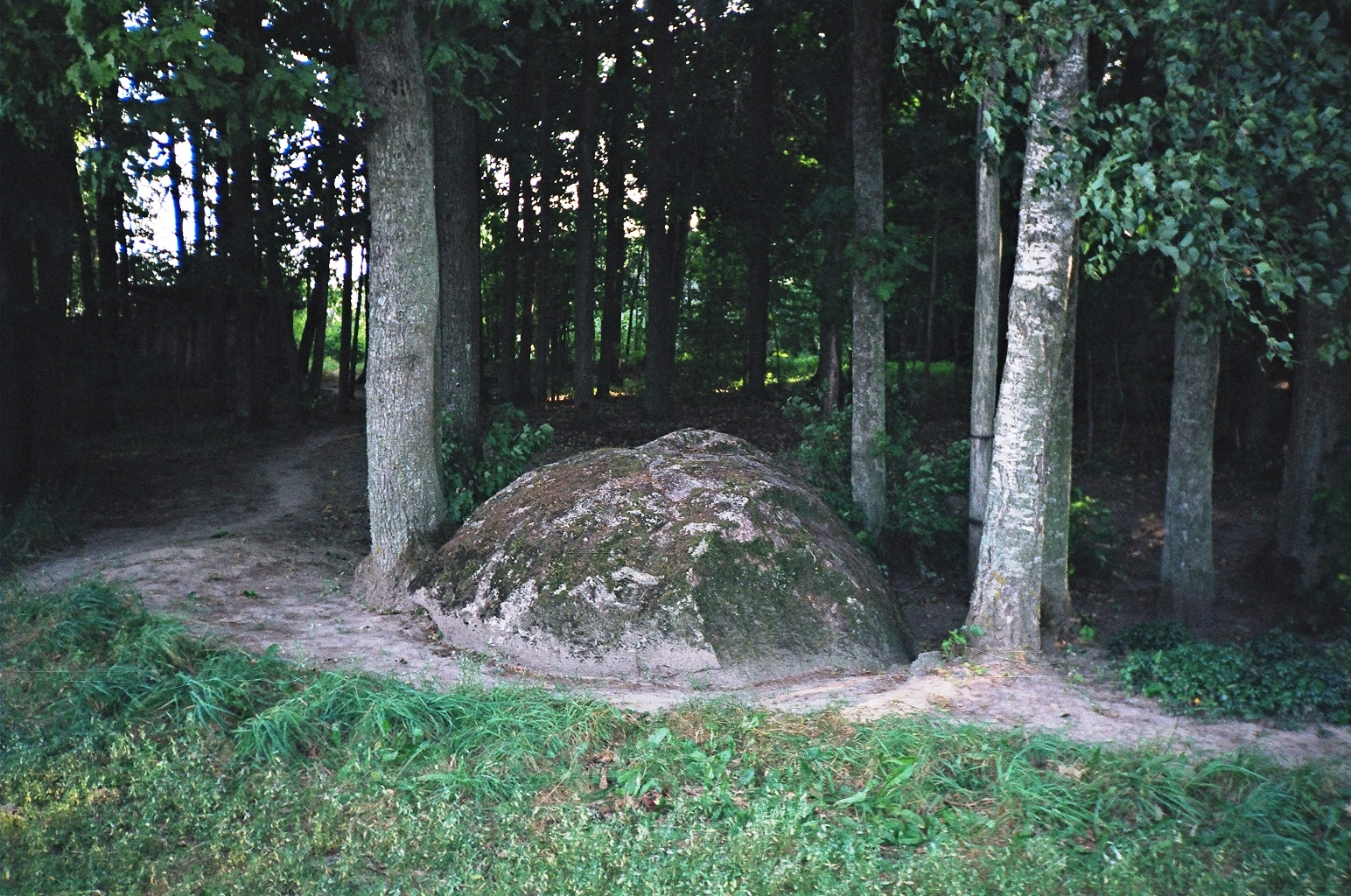

- Location within Lithuania
- Coordinates: 55.914°N 24.891°E
- Country: Lithuania
- County: Panevėžys County

Population
  - Total: 100
- Time zone: Eastern European Time (UTC+2)
  - Summer (DST): Eastern European Summer Time (UTC+3)

Gyvakarai is a village in Biržai District Municipality, Panevėžys County, Lithuania. The population was 100 in 2011.
