= Armonys =

- Village
- Location within Lithuania
- Coordinates: 56.072°N 25.694°E
- Country: Lithuania
- County: Panevėžys County
- Time zone: Eastern European Time (UTC+2)
  - Summer (DST): Eastern European Summer Time (UTC+3)

Armonys is a village in Rokiškis District Municipality, Panevėžys County, Lithuania. It is located near the border with Latvia.
