= Didsodė =

- Village
- Location within Lithuania
- Coordinates: 56.084°N 25.565°E
- Country: Lithuania
- County: Panevėžys County

Population
  - Total: 162
- Time zone: Eastern European Time (UTC+2)
  - Summer (DST): Eastern European Summer Time (UTC+3)

Didsodė is a village in Rokiškis District Municipality, Panevėžys County, Lithuania. The population was 162 in 2011.
