= Girbučiai =

- Village
- Location within Lithuania
- Coordinates: 56.004°N 25.062°E
- Country: Lithuania
- County: Panevėžys County
- First mention: 1642

Population
  - Total: 7
- Time zone: Eastern European Time (UTC+2)
  - Summer (DST): Eastern European Summer Time (UTC+3)

Girbučiai is a village in Kupiškis District Municipality, Panevėžys County, Lithuania. The village covers an area of some 273 ha (675 acres). Its population was 50 in 1979, and 7 in 2011.

== History ==
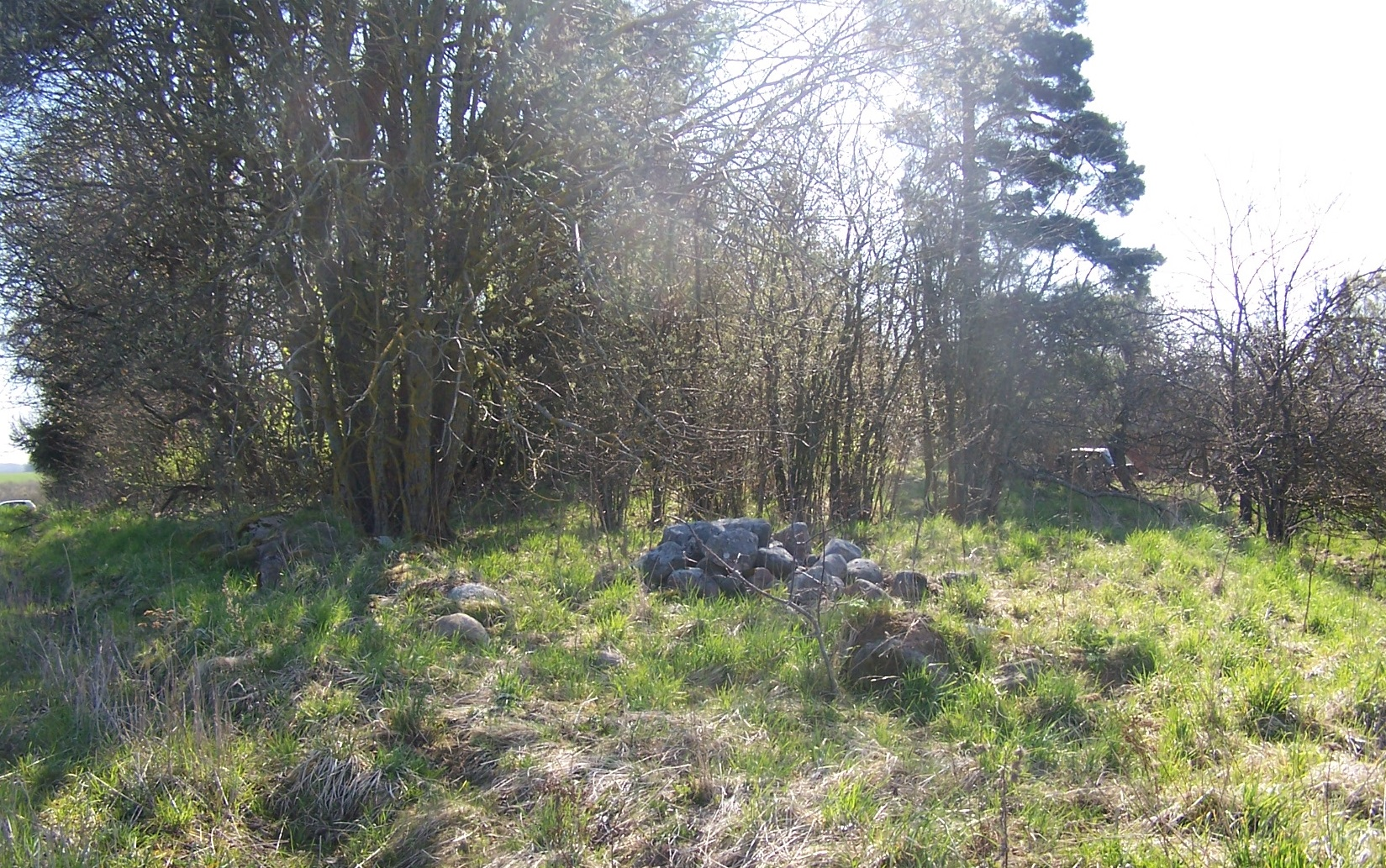
Girbučiai barrow

In 1969, an archeological study found a 10 metres (33 ft) diameter, 1.5 metres (4 ft 11 in) high burrial mound in the north of the village with its stone crown dismantled. The found buried bones were dated to belong to inhabitants from circa II-IV century AD.
