= Abejutai =

- Village
- Location within Lithuania
- Coordinates: 55.981°N 25.016°E
- Country: Lithuania
- County: Panevėžys County

Population
  - Total: 8
- Time zone: Eastern European Time (UTC+2)
  - Summer (DST): Eastern European Summer Time (UTC+3)

Abejutai is a village in Kupiškis District Municipality, Panevėžys County, Lithuania. The population was 8 in 2011.
