= Juodiniai =

Juodiniai may refer to:

- Juodiniai, Kupiškis District
- Juodiniai, Zarasai District
