= Čečiškiai =

- Village
- Location within Lithuania
- Coordinates: 56.022°N 25.033°E
- Country: Lithuania
- County: Panevėžys County

Population
  - Total: 0
- Time zone: Eastern European Time (UTC+2)
  - Summer (DST): Eastern European Summer Time (UTC+3)

Čečiškiai is a village in Kupiškis District Municipality, Panevėžys County, Lithuania, covering some 311 ha (768 acres). The population was 6 in 1979, and 0 in 2011.
