= Skapiškis Eldership =

Eldership of Lithuania

The Skapiškis Eldership (Lithuanian: Skapiškio seniūnija) is an eldership of Lithuania, located in the Kupiškis District Municipality. In 2021 its population was 1251.
