= Kupreliškis =

- Town
- Location in Lithuania
- Coordinates: 56°02′20″N 24°58′00″E
- Country: Lithuania
- County: Panevėžys County
- Municipality: Biržai district municipality
- Eldership: Papilys eldership

Population (2011)
  - Total: 188
- Time zone: UTC+2 (EET)
  - Summer (DST): UTC+3 (EEST)

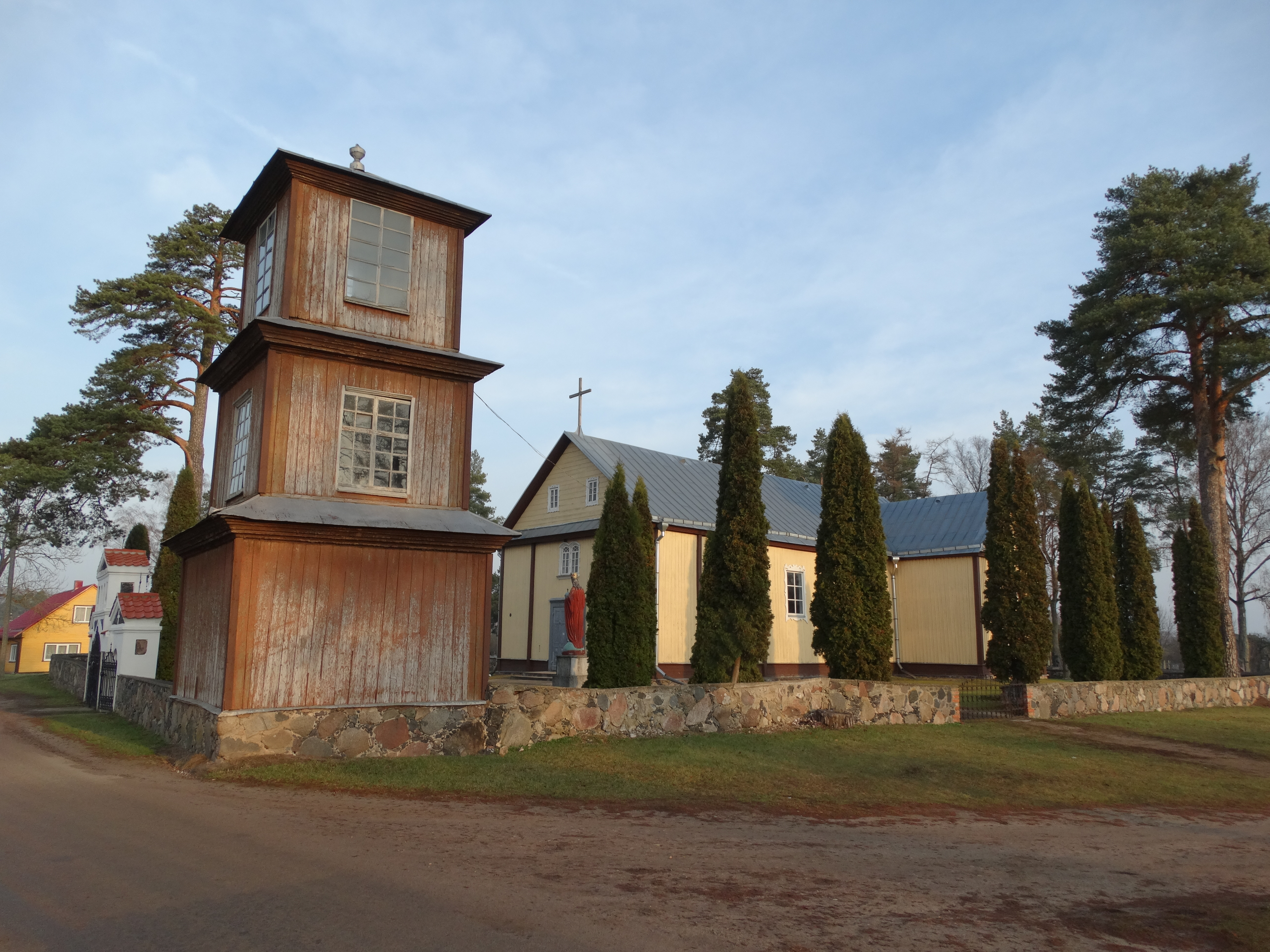
Roman Catholic Church, Kupreliškis, Biržai district, Lithuania

Kupreliškis (Polish: Kupreliszki) is a town in Biržai district municipality, in Panevėžys County, northern Lithuania. According to the 2011 census, the town has a population of 188 people.
