= Papilys Eldership =

Eldership of Lithuania

The Papilys Eldership (Lithuanian: Papilio seniūnija) is an eldership of Lithuania, located in the Biržai District Municipality. In 2021 its population was 1439.
