= Noriūnai Eldership =

Eldership of Lithuania

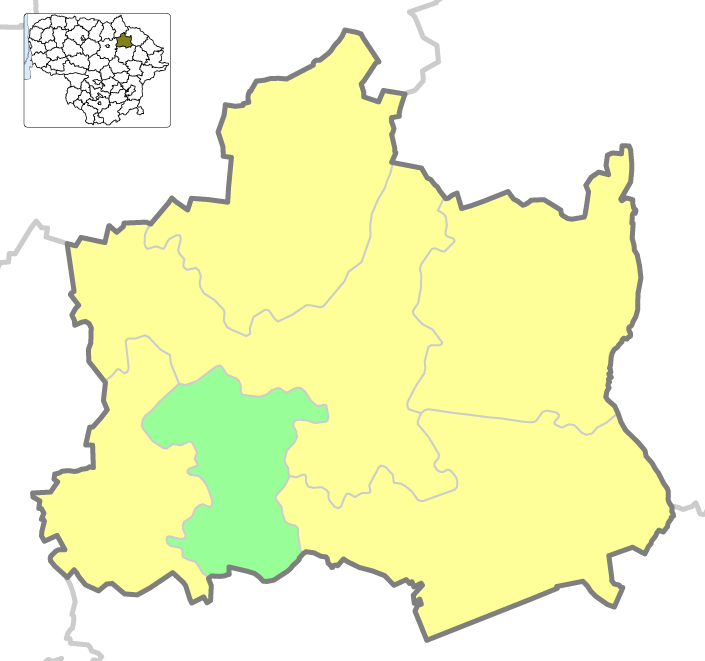

The Noriūnai Eldership (Lithuanian: Noriūnų seniūnija) is an eldership of Lithuania, located in the Kupiškis District Municipality. In 2021 its population was 1712.
