= Nemunėlis (disambiguation) =

Nemunėlis is a river in northern Lithuania and southern Latvia.

Nemunėlis may also refer to:

- Nemunėlis, Biržai District, Lithuania
- Nemunėlis, Rokiškis District, Lithuania
- Vytė Nemunėlis, pen name of Bernardas Brazdžionis, Lithuanian poet
