= Alizava Eldership =

Location of Alizava Eldership in Kupiškis District Municipality

The Alizava Eldership (Lithuanian: Alizavos seniūnija) is an eldership of Lithuania, located in the Kupiškis District Municipality. In 2021, its population was 1376.
