= Kupiškis Eldership =

Eldership of Lithuania

The Kupiškis Eldership (Lithuanian: Kupiškio seniūnija) is an eldership of Lithuania, located in the Kupiškis District Municipality. In 2021 its population was 3025.
