= Parovėja Eldership =

Eldership of Lithuania

The Parovėja Eldership (Lithuanian: Parovėjos seniūnija) is an eldership of Lithuania, located in the Biržai District Municipality. In 2021 its population was 1607.
