= Pačeriaukštė Eldership =

Eldership of Lithuania

Coordinates: 56.2570°N 24.5806°E

The Pačeriaukštė Eldership (Lithuanian: Pačeriaukštės seniūnija) is an eldership of Lithuania, located in the Biržai District Municipality. As of 2021 its population was 1,130.
