= Vabalninkas Eldership =

Eldership of Lithuania

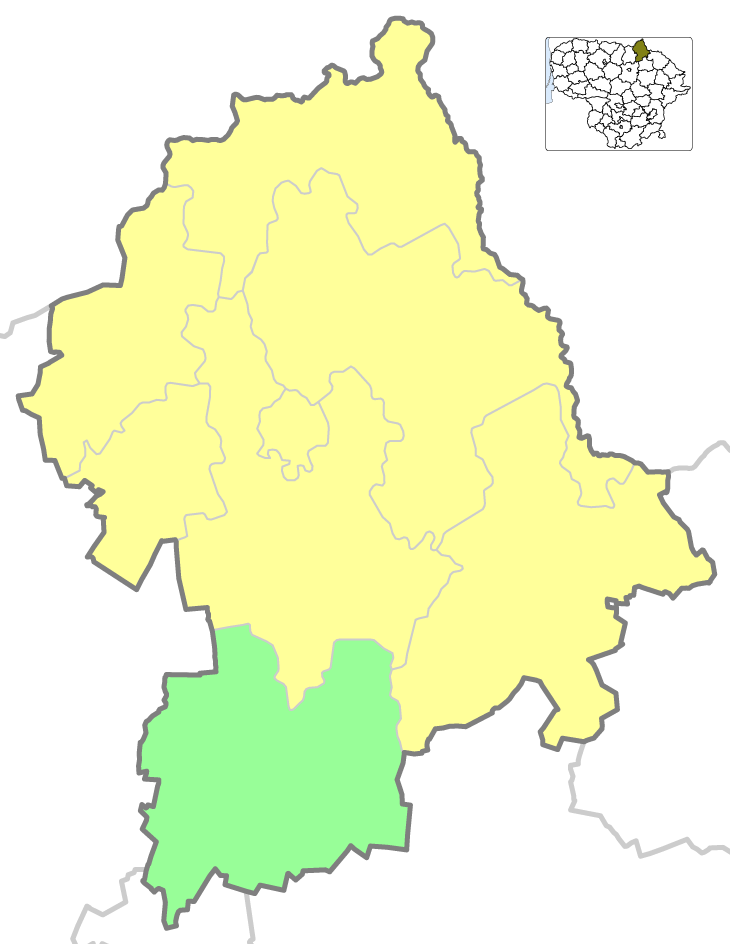

The Vabalninkas Eldership (Lithuanian: Vabalninko seniūnija) is an eldership of Lithuania, located in the Biržai District Municipality. In 2021 its population was 2293.
