= Šimonys Eldership =

Eldership of Lithuania

The Šimonys Eldership (Lithuanian: Šimonių seniūnija) is an eldership of Lithuania, located in the Kupiškis District Municipality. In 2021 its population was 1291.
