= Ginotai =

- Village
- Location within Lithuania
- Coordinates: 56.122°N 25.624°E
- Country: Lithuania
- County: Panevėžys County

Population
  - Total: 5
- Time zone: Eastern European Time (UTC+2)
  - Summer (DST): Eastern European Summer Time (UTC+3)

Ginotai is a village in Biržai District Municipality, Panevėžys County, Lithuania. The population was 5 in 2011. It is located 1 km from the border with Latvia.
