= Širvėna Eldership =

Eldership of Lithuania

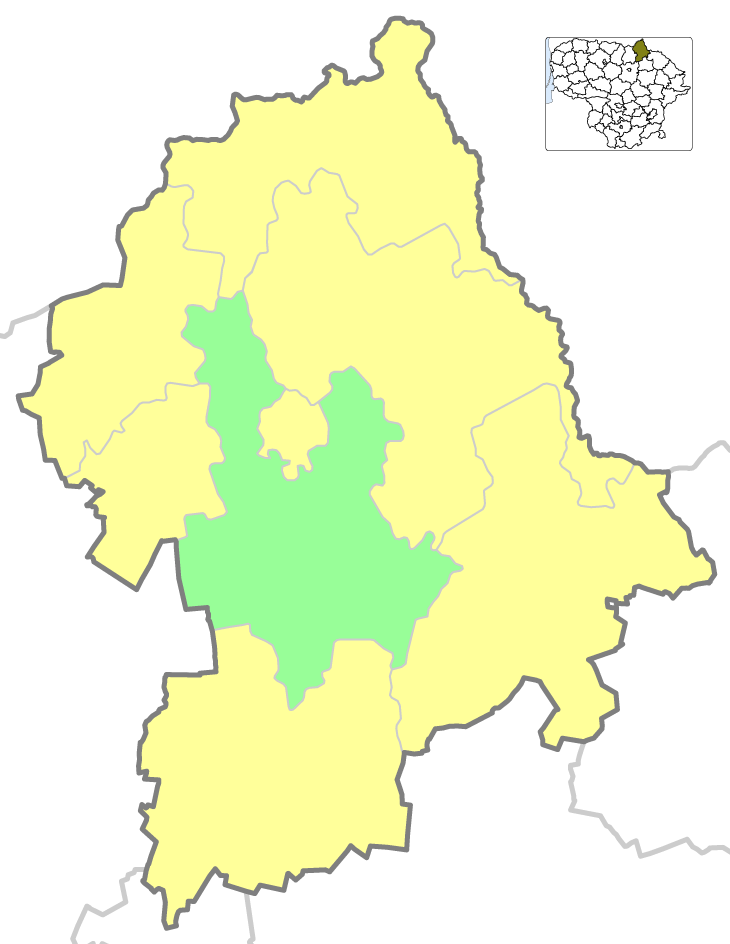
Location of Širvėna Eldership in Biržai District Municipality

The Širvėna Eldership (Lithuanian: Širvėnos seniūnija) is an eldership of Lithuania, located in the Biržai District Municipality. In 2021 its population was 3431.
