= NUTS statistical regions of Lithuania =

Statistical regions of Lithuania

In the NUTS (Nomenclature of Territorial Units for Statistics) codes of Lithuania (LT), the three levels are:

Level	Subdivisions	#
NUTS 1	—	1
NUTS 2	Central and Western Lithuania Region, Capital Region	2
NUTS 3	Counties (Apskritys)	10

== NUTS codes ==
LT0 Lithuania

LT01 Capital Region

LT011 Vilnius County

LT02 Central and Western Lithuania Region

LT021 Alytus County
LT022 Kaunas County
LT023 Klaipėda County
LT024 Marijampolė County
LT025 Panevėžys County
LT026 Šiauliai County
LT027 Tauragė County
LT028 Telšiai County
LT029 Utena County

== Local administrative units ==
Below the NUTS levels, the two LAU (Local Administrative Units) levels are:

=== Until 2017 ===
Level	Subdivisions	#
LAU 1	Municipalities (Savivaldybės)	60
LAU 2	Elderships (Seniūnijos)	518

The LAU codes of Lithuania can be downloaded here:

== See also ==
- Subdivisions of Lithuania
- ISO 3166-2 codes of Lithuania
- FIPS region codes of Lithuania

== Sources ==
- Hierarchical list of the Nomenclature of territorial units for statistics - NUTS and the Statistical regions of Europe
- Overview map of EU Countries - NUTS level 1
  - LIETUVA - NUTS level 2
  - LIETUVA - NUTS level 3
- Correspondence between the NUTS levels and the national administrative units
- List of current NUTS codes
  - Download current NUTS codes (ODS format)
- Counties of Lithuania, Statoids.com
