= Kamajai Eldership =

Eldership of Lithuania

The Kamajai Eldership (Lithuanian: Kamajų seniūnija) is an eldership of Lithuania, located in the Rokiškis District Municipality. In 2021 its population was 1668.
