= Rokiškis Rural Eldership =

Eldership of Lithuania

The Rokiškis Rural Eldership (Lithuanian: Rokiškio kaimiškoji seniūnija) is an eldership of Lithuania, located in the Rokiškis District Municipality. In 2021 its population was 4125.
