= Kazliškis Eldership =

Eldership of Lithuania

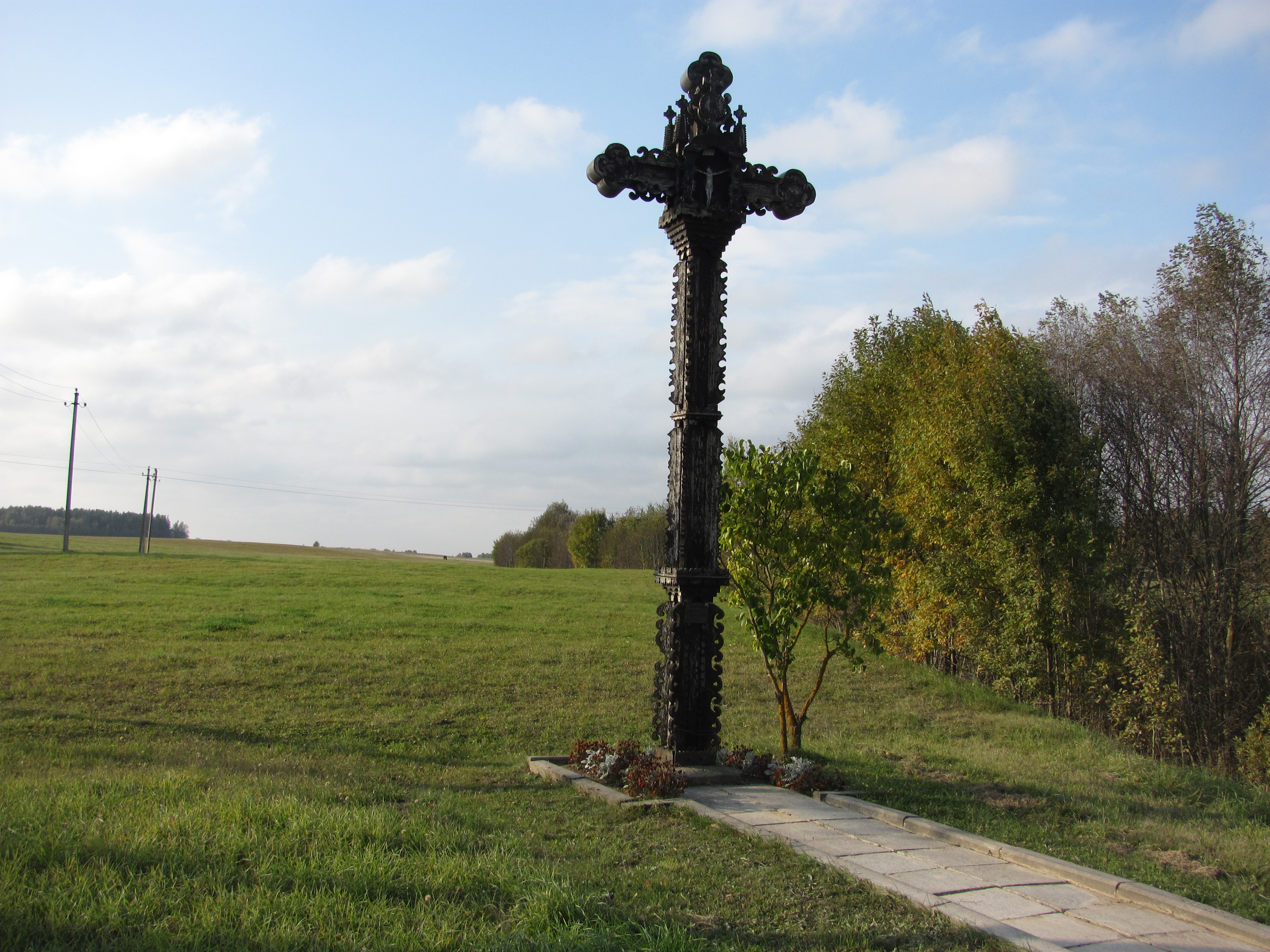
Kazliškio sen., Lithuania

The Kazliškis Eldership (Lithuanian: Kazliškio seniūnija) is an eldership of Lithuania, located in the Rokiškis District Municipality. In 2021 its population was 517.
