= Pandėlys Eldership =

Eldership of Lithuania

The Pandėlys Eldership (Lithuanian: Pandėlio seniūnija) is an eldership of Lithuania, located in the Rokiškis District Municipality. In 2021 its population was 2321.
