= Pabiržė =

- Town
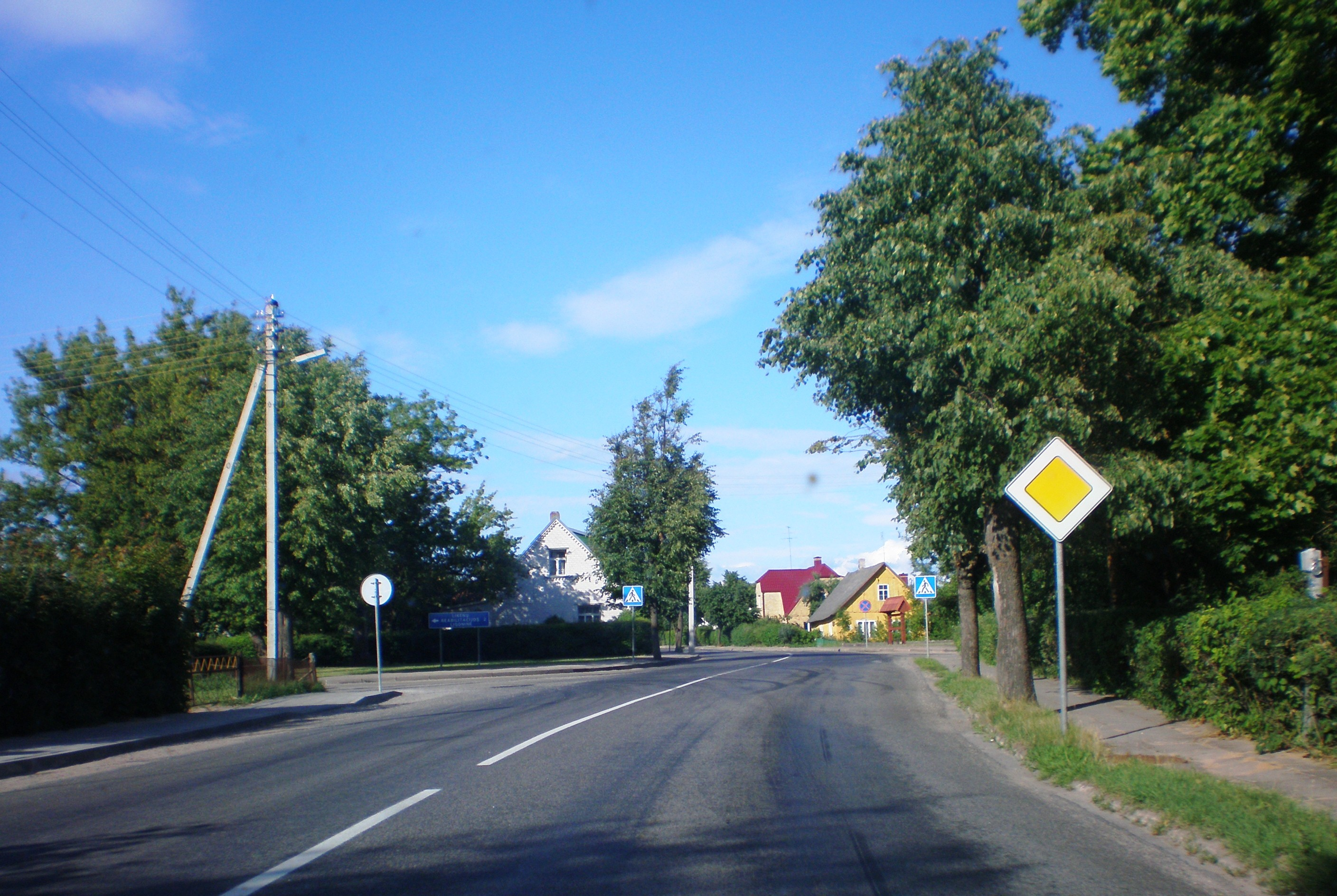

- Location within Lithuania
- Coordinates: 56°11′20″N 24°38′30″E
- Country: Lithuania
- County: Panevėžys County

Population (2011)
  - Total: 300
- Time zone: UTC+2 (EET)
  - Summer (DST): UTC+3 (EEST)

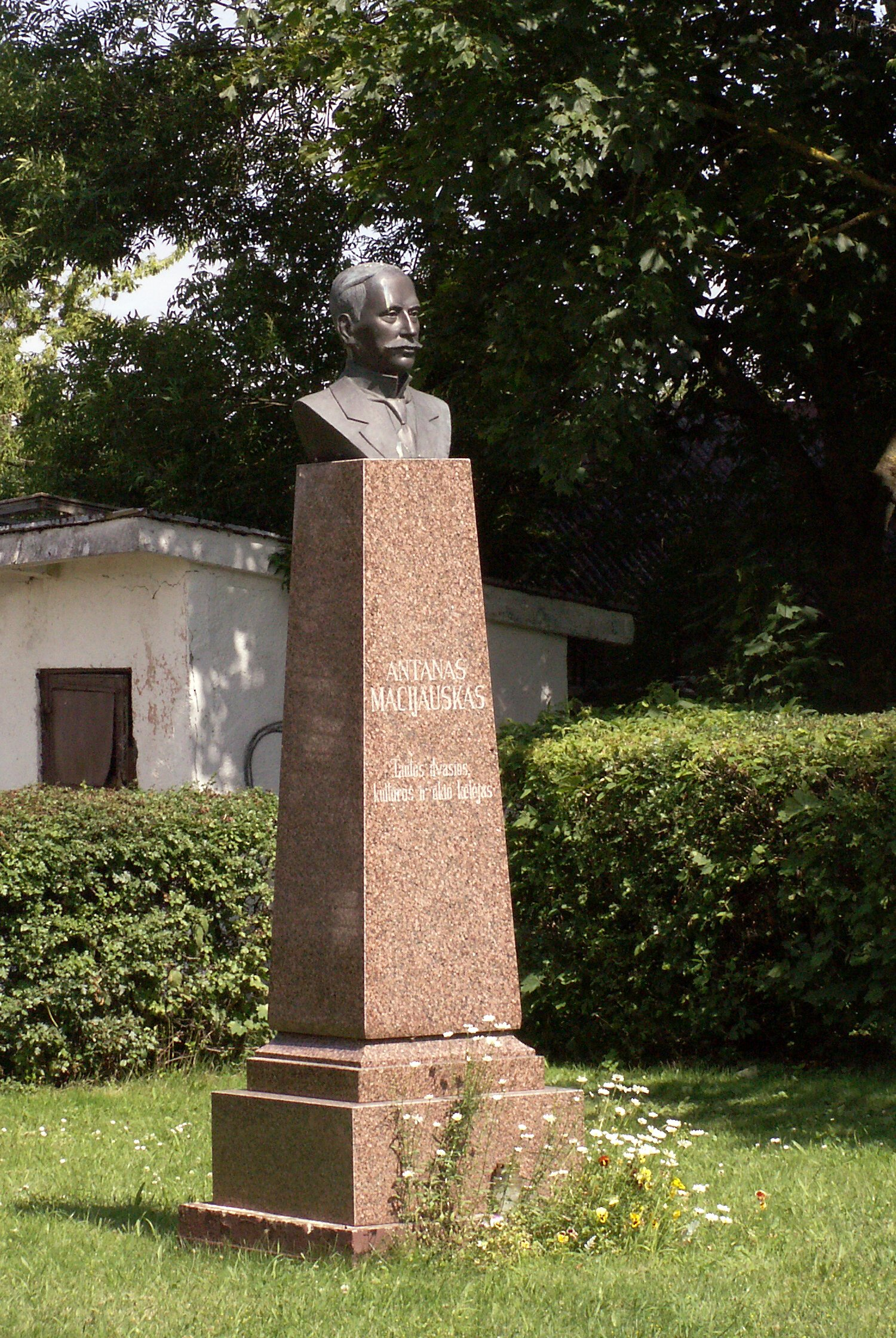
Antanas Macijauskas Monument

Pabiržė (Polish: Podbirże) is a small town in Panevėžys County, in northeastern Lithuania. According to the 2011 census, the town has a population of 300 people.
