= Panemunėlis Eldership =

Eldership of Lithuania

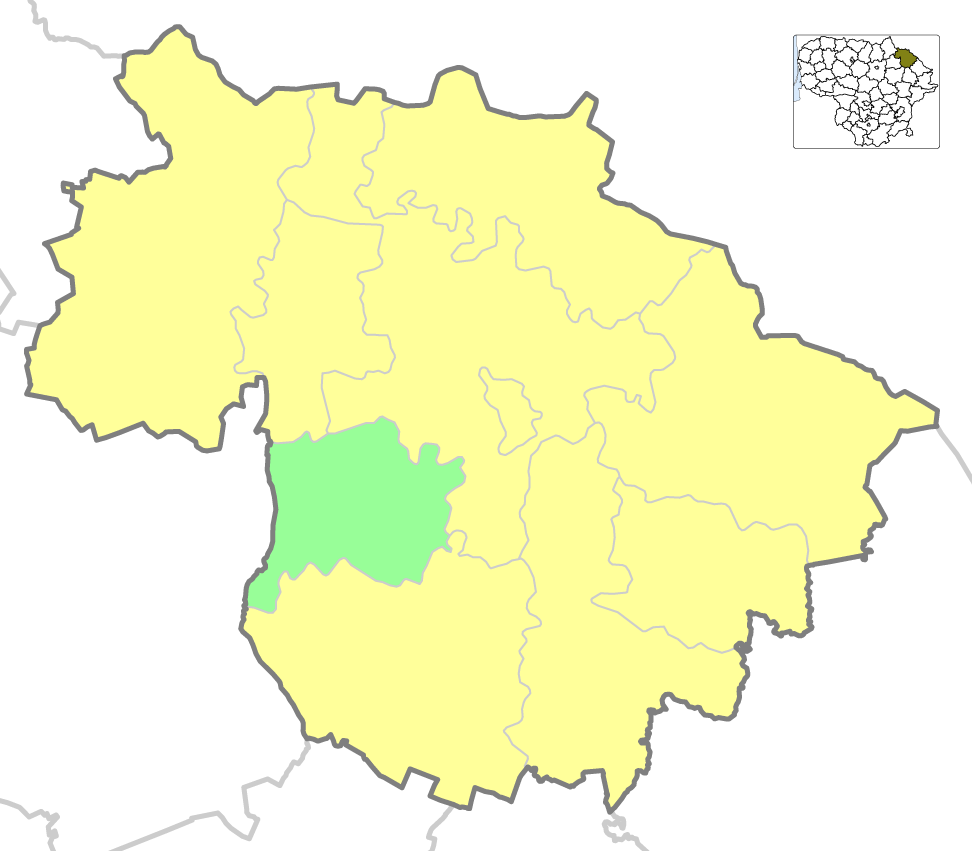

The Panemunėlis Eldership (Lithuanian: Panemunėlio seniūnija) is an eldership of Lithuania, located in the Rokiškis District Municipality. In 2021 its population was 1088.
