= Nemunėlio Radviliškis Eldership =

Eldership of Lithuania

The Nemunėlio Radviliškis Eldership (Lithuanian: Nemunėlio Radviliškio seniūnija) is an eldership of Lithuania, located in the Biržai District Municipality. In 2021 its population was 1238.
