= Kriauniai Eldership =

Eldership of Lithuania

The Kriauniai Eldership (Lithuanian: Kriaunų seniūnija) is an eldership of Lithuania, located in the Rokiškis District Municipality. In 2021 its population was 752.
