= Obeliai Eldership =

Eldership of Lithuania

The Obeliai Eldership (Lithuanian: Obelių seniūnija) is an eldership of Lithuania, located in the Rokiškis District Municipality. In 2021 its population was 2435.
