= Jūžintai Eldership =

Eldership of Lithuania

The Jūžintai Eldership (Lithuanian: Bijotų seniūnija) is an eldership of Lithuania, located in the Rokiškis District Municipality. In 2021 its population was 1304.
