= Juodiniai, Zarasai District =

Juodiniai
- Village
- Location within Lithuania
- Coordinates: 55.630°N 26.541°E
- Country: Lithuania
- County: Utena County

Population
  - Total: 2
- Time zone: Eastern European Time (UTC+2)
  - Summer (DST): Eastern European Summer Time (UTC+3)

Juodiniai is a village in Zarasai District Municipality, Utena County, Lithuania. The population was 2 in 2011.
