= Juodupė Eldership =

Eldership of Lithuania

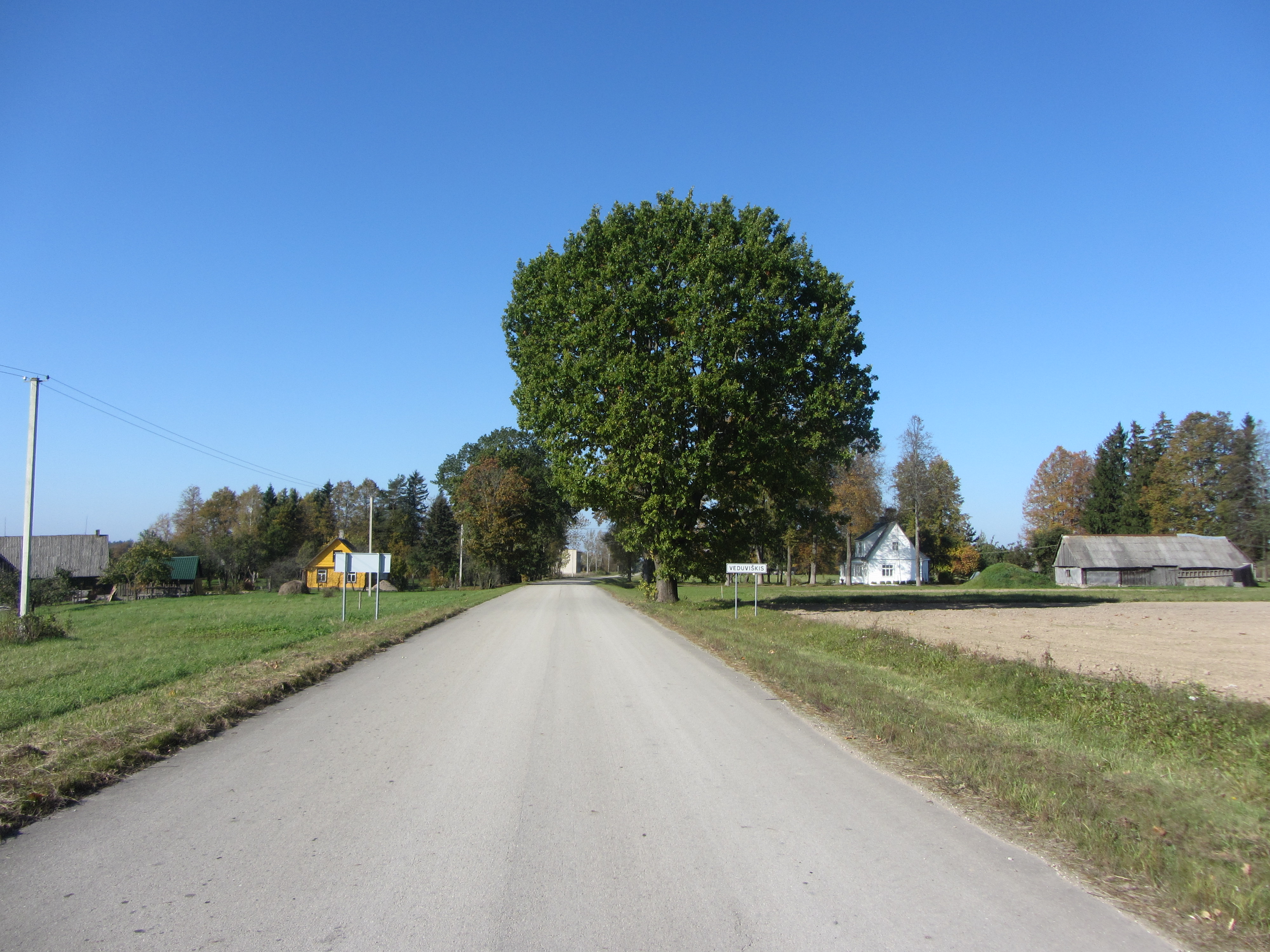
Juodupė eldership, Lithuania

The Juodupė Eldership (Lithuanian: Juodupės seniūnija) is an eldership of Lithuania, located in the Rokiškis District Municipality. In 2021, its population was 2735.
