= Rokiškis District Municipality =

Coordinates: 55°57′00″N 25°34′26″E

Rokiškis District Municipality Rokiškio rajono savivaldybė
- Municipality
- Flag Coat of arms

- Location of Rokiškis district municipality within Lithuania

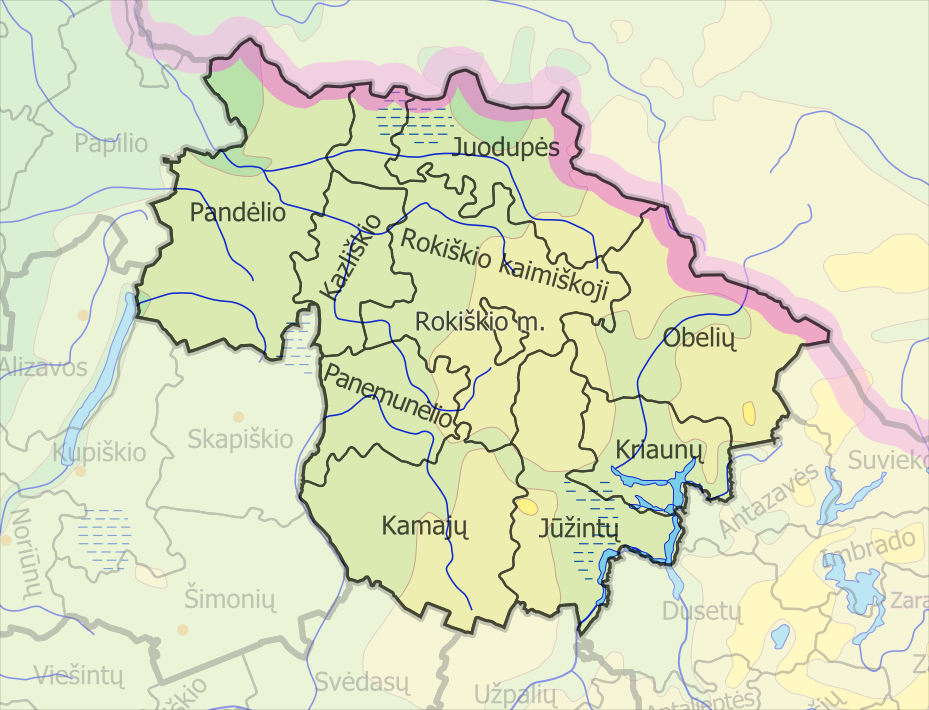
- Map of Rokiškis district municipality
- Country: Lithuania
- Ethnographic region: Aukštaitija
- County: Panevėžys County
- Capital: Rokiškis
- Elderships: 10

Area
  - Total: 1,807 km^{2} (698 sq mi)
  - Rank: 4-5th

Population (2021)
  - Total: 28,715
  - Rank: 26th
  - Density: 15.89/km^{2} (41.16/sq mi)
  - Rank: 46th
- Time zone: UTC+2 (EET)
  - Summer (DST): UTC+3 (EEST)
- Telephone code: 458
- Major settlements: Rokiškis (pop. 11,765); Juodupė (pop. 1,549); Obeliai (pop. 842)
- Website: www.rokiskis.lt

Rokiškis District Municipality is one of 60 municipalities in Lithuania.

== Structure ==
District structure:

- 3 cities (miestas) – Obeliai, Pandėlys and Rokiškis;
- 9 towns (miestelis) – Čedasai, Duokiškis, Juodupė, Jūžintai, Kamajai, Panemunėlis, Panemunis, Salos and Suvainiškis;
- 689 villages.
- Elderships:
1. Juodupė Eldership
2. Jūžintai Eldership
3. Kamajai Eldership
4. Kazliškis Eldership
5. Kriauniai Eldership
6. Obeliai Eldership
7. Pandėlys Eldership
8. Panemunėlis Eldership
9. Rokiškis City Eldership
10. Rokiškis Rural Eldership
