= Kupiškis District Municipality =

Coordinates: 55°49′59″N 25°01′08″E

Kupiškis District Municipality Kupiškio rajono savivaldybė
- Municipality
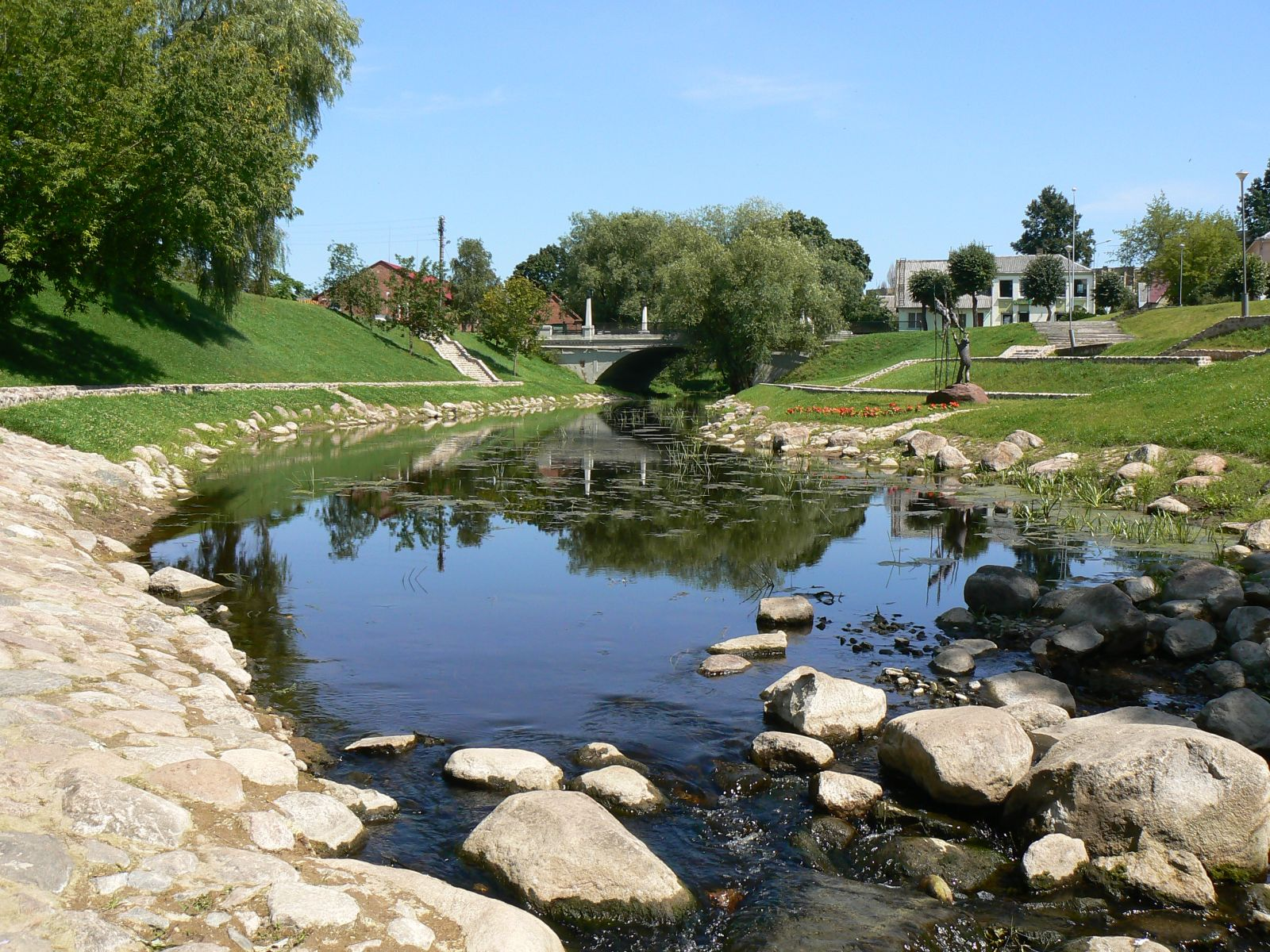
- Kupa is a river flowing through Kupiškis

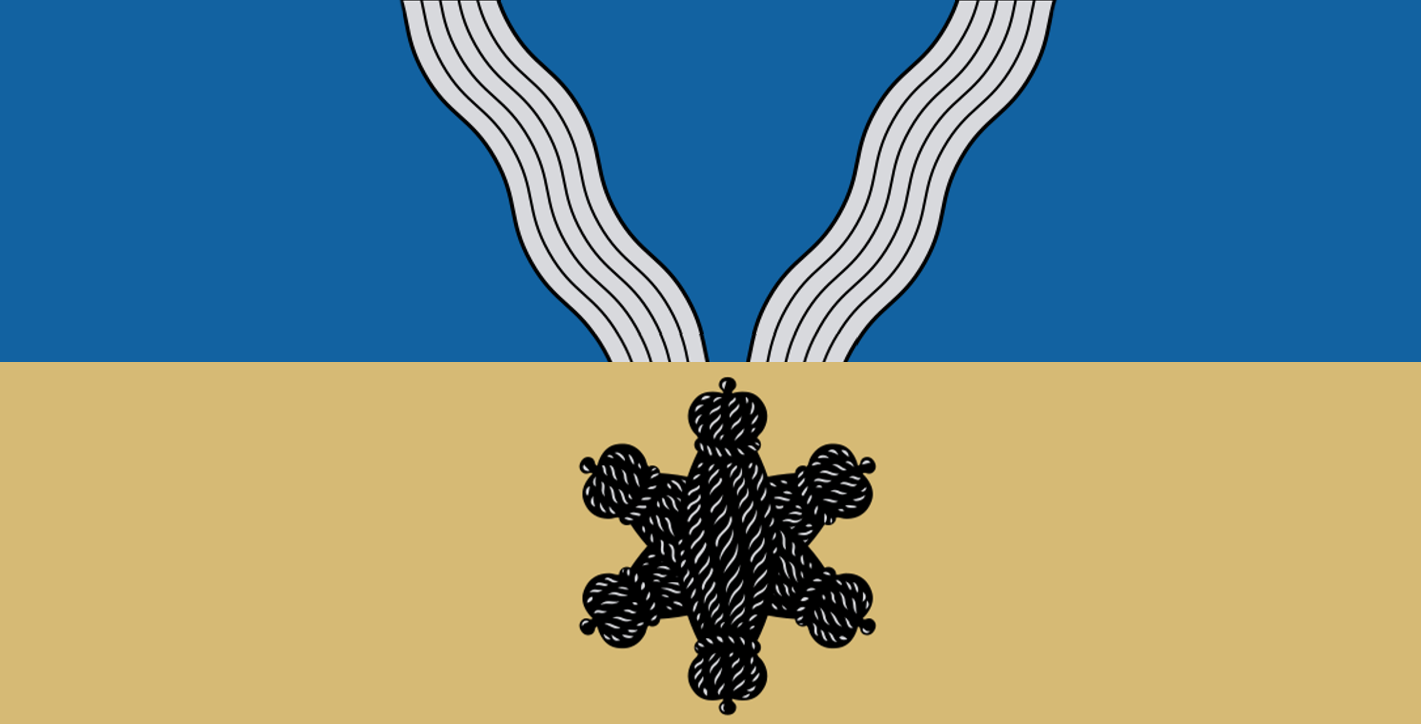
- Flag Coat of arms

- Location of Kupiškis district municipality within Lithuania

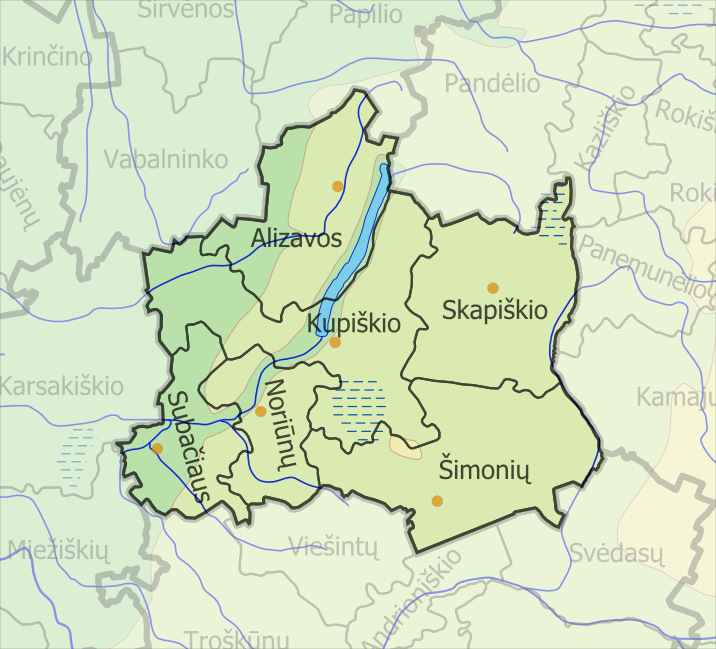
- Map of Kupiškis district municipality
- Country: Lithuania
- Ethnographic region: Aukštaitija
- County: Panevėžys County
- Capital: Kupiškis
- Elderships: 6

Area
  - Total: 1,080 km^{2} (420 sq mi)
  - Rank: 37th

Population (2021)
  - Total: 16,530
  - Rank: 50th
  - Density: 15.3/km^{2} (39.6/sq mi)
  - Rank: 48th
- Time zone: UTC+2 (EET)
  - Summer (DST): UTC+3 (EEST)
- Telephone code: 459
- Major settlements: Kupiškis (pop. 6,138)
- Website: www.kupiskis.lt

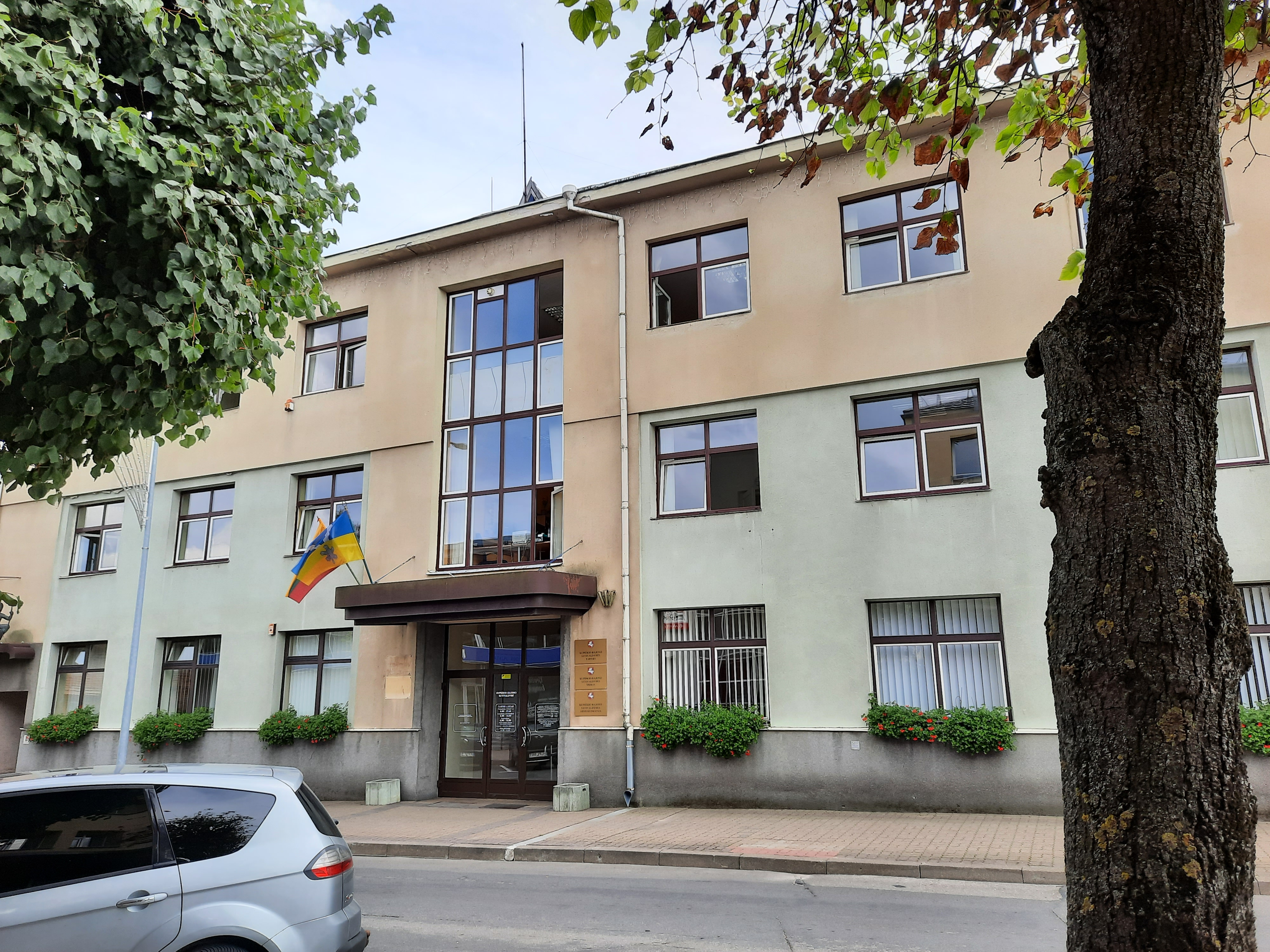
Municipality headquarters

Kupiškis District Municipality is one of 60 municipalities in Lithuania. It has a total area of 420 square miles (1,080 km²). In 2021, there was a population of 16,530.

== Villages ==
- Kunigiškis
- Kalnagaliai
