= Biržai District Municipality =

Biržai District Municipality Biržų rajono savivaldybė
- District Municipality
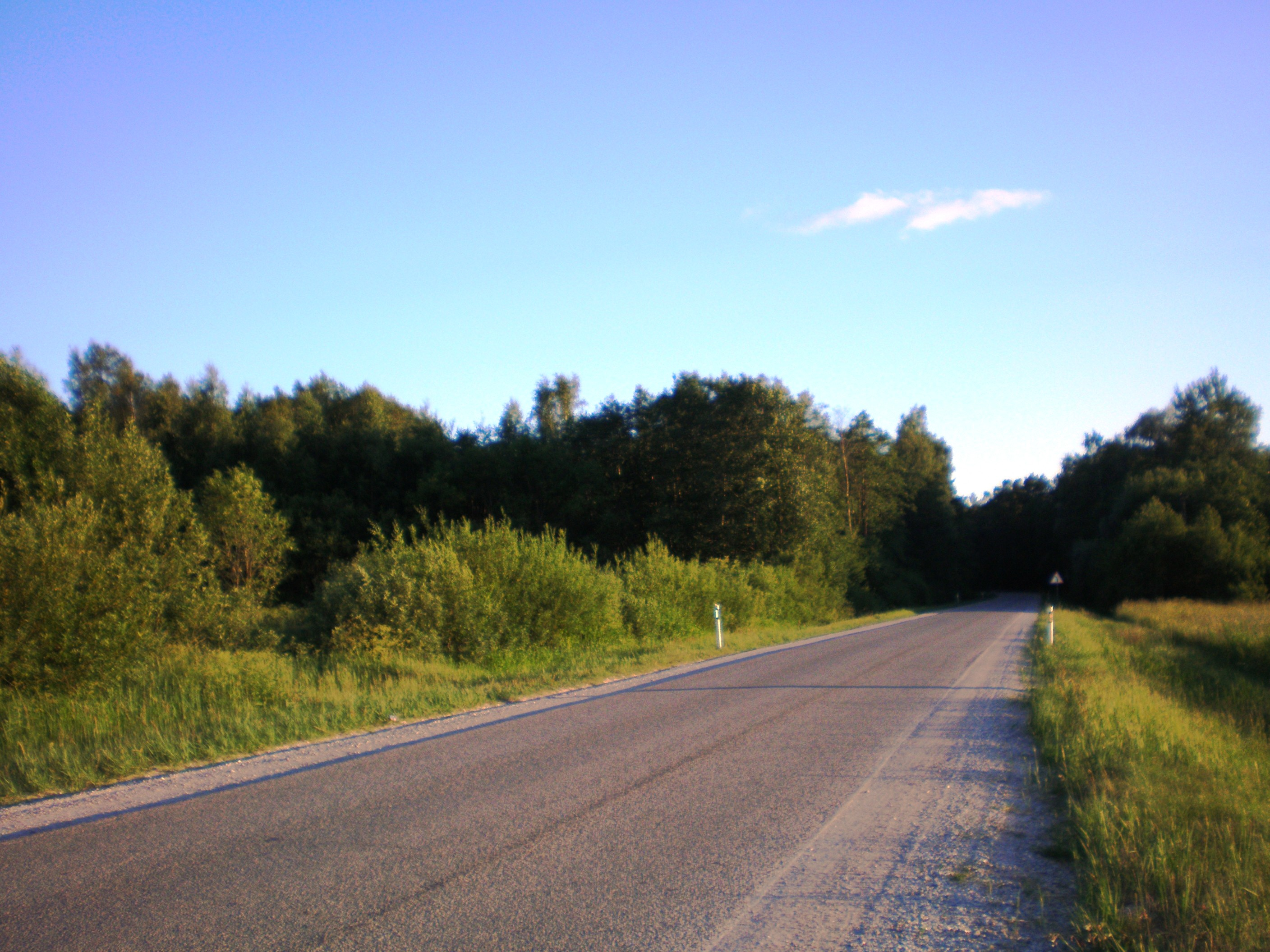
- The Green Forest (Žalioji giria)

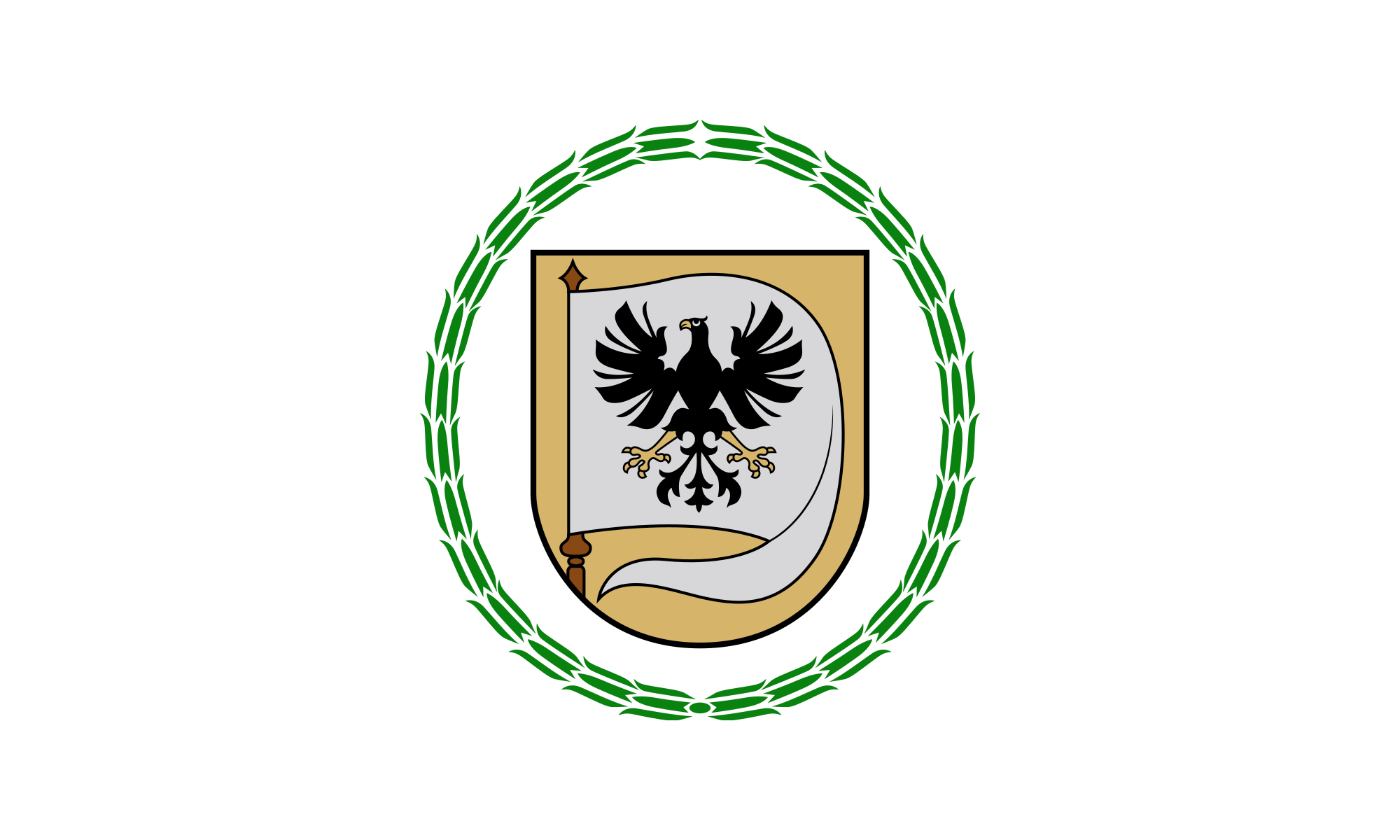
- Flag Coat of arms

- Location of Biržai District Municipality within Lithuania

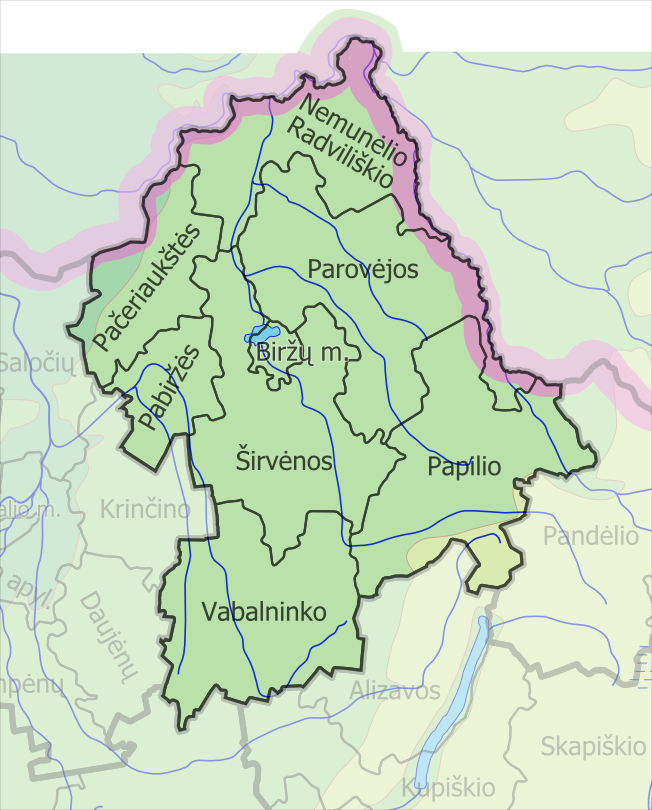
- Location of Biržai
- Coordinates: 56°16′58″N 24°48′45″E
- Country: Lithuania
- Region: Aukštaitija
- County: Panevėžys County
- Established: 1950 (76 years ago)
- Capital: Biržai
- Elderships: 8

Government
  - Type: City Council
  - Body: Biržai District Council
  - Mayor: Kęstutis Knizikevičius (LSDP)
  - Leading: Social Democratic Party 8 / 25

Area
  - Total: 1,476 km^{2} (570 sq mi)
  - Rank: 16th
- Elevation: 88 m (289 ft)

Population (2022)
  - Total: 22,580
  - Rank: 37th
  - Density: 15.3/km^{2} (40/sq mi)
  - Rank: 48th
- Time zone: UTC+2 (EET)
  - Summer (DST): UTC+3 (EEST)
- ZIP Codes: 41100–41481
- Phone code: +370 (450)
- Website: www.birzai.lt

Biržai District Municipality is a Lithuanian municipality, located in northern Lithuania, Aukštaitija ethnographic region, Panevėžys County.

The towns of Biržai and Vabalninkas lie within the district. About 64% of its land is agricultural, including a number of organic farms. Portions are protected in Biržai Regional Park and as botanical and geological reserves.

== Elderships ==
Biržai District Municipality is divided into 8 elderships:

Eldership (Administrative Center)	Area	Population (2021)
Biržai (Biržai)	16.35 km^{2} (4,040.17 acres; 6.31 sq mi)	10,734
Nemunėlio Radviliškis (Nemunėlio Radviliškis)	200 km^{2} (49,421.08 acres; 77.22 sq mi)	1,238
Pabiržė (Pabiržė)	90 km^{2} (22,239.48 acres; 34.75 sq mi)	1,442
Pačeriaukštė (Pačeriaukštė)	110 km^{2} (27,181.59 acres; 42.47 sq mi)	1,130
Papilys (Papilys)	250 km^{2} (61,776.35 acres; 96.53 sq mi)	1,439
Parovėja (Parovėja)	174 km^{2} (42,996.34 acres; 67.18 sq mi)	1,607
Širvėna (Biržai)	258 km^{2} (63,753.19 acres; 99.61 sq mi)	3,431
Vabalninkas (Vabalninkas)	211 km^{2} (52,139.24 acres; 81.47 sq mi)	2,293

== Landmarks ==
- Sinkholes around Biržai, including Karvės ola (Cow's Hole)
- Biržai Castle
- Lithuania's northernmost point (56°27′1″N 24°53′7″E)

== Structure ==
District structure:

- 2 cities – Biržai and Vabalninkas;
- 4 towns – Kupreliškis, Nemunėlio Radviliškis, Pabiržė and Papilys;
- 538 villages including Ginotai, Briedžiai and Brukos.

Biggest population (2001):

- Biržai – 15262
- Vabalninkas – 1328
- Biržai village – 874
- Nemunėlio Radviliškis – 729
- Medeikiai – 656
- Kirdonys – 492
- Naciūnai – 455
- Germaniškis – 429
- Parovėja – 402
