= Panevėžys County =

County of Lithuania

Coordinates: 55°44′15″N 24°22′13″E

Panevėžys County Panevėžio apskritis
- County
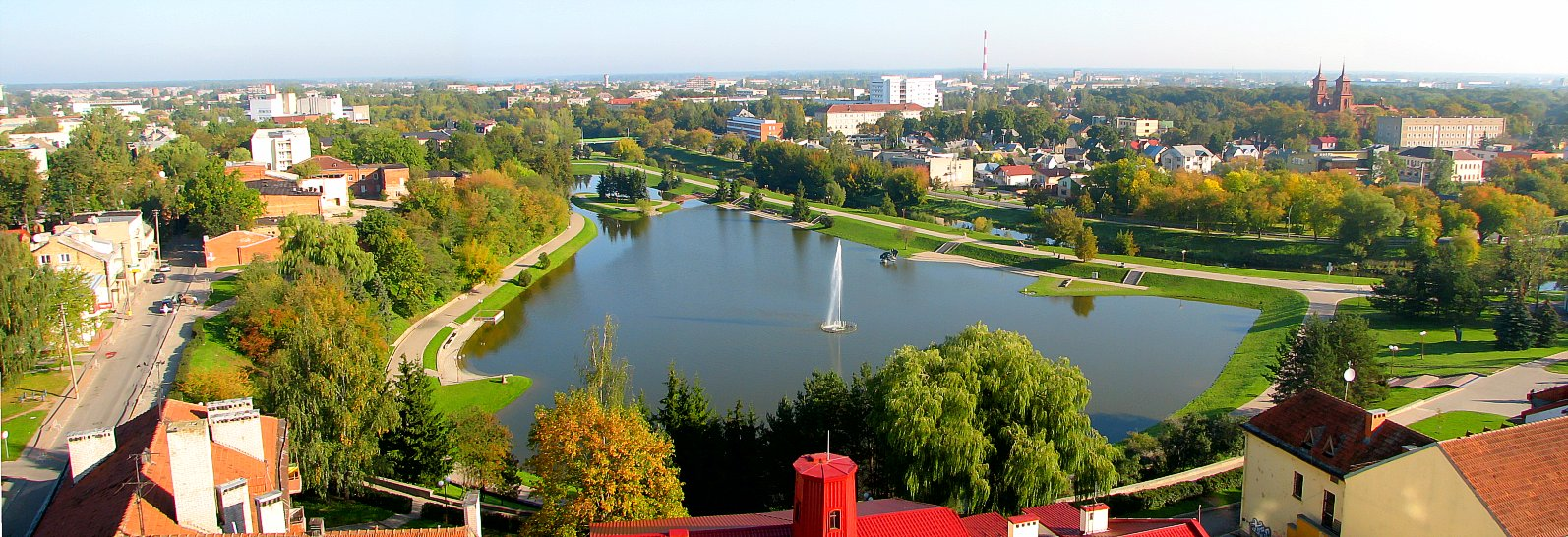
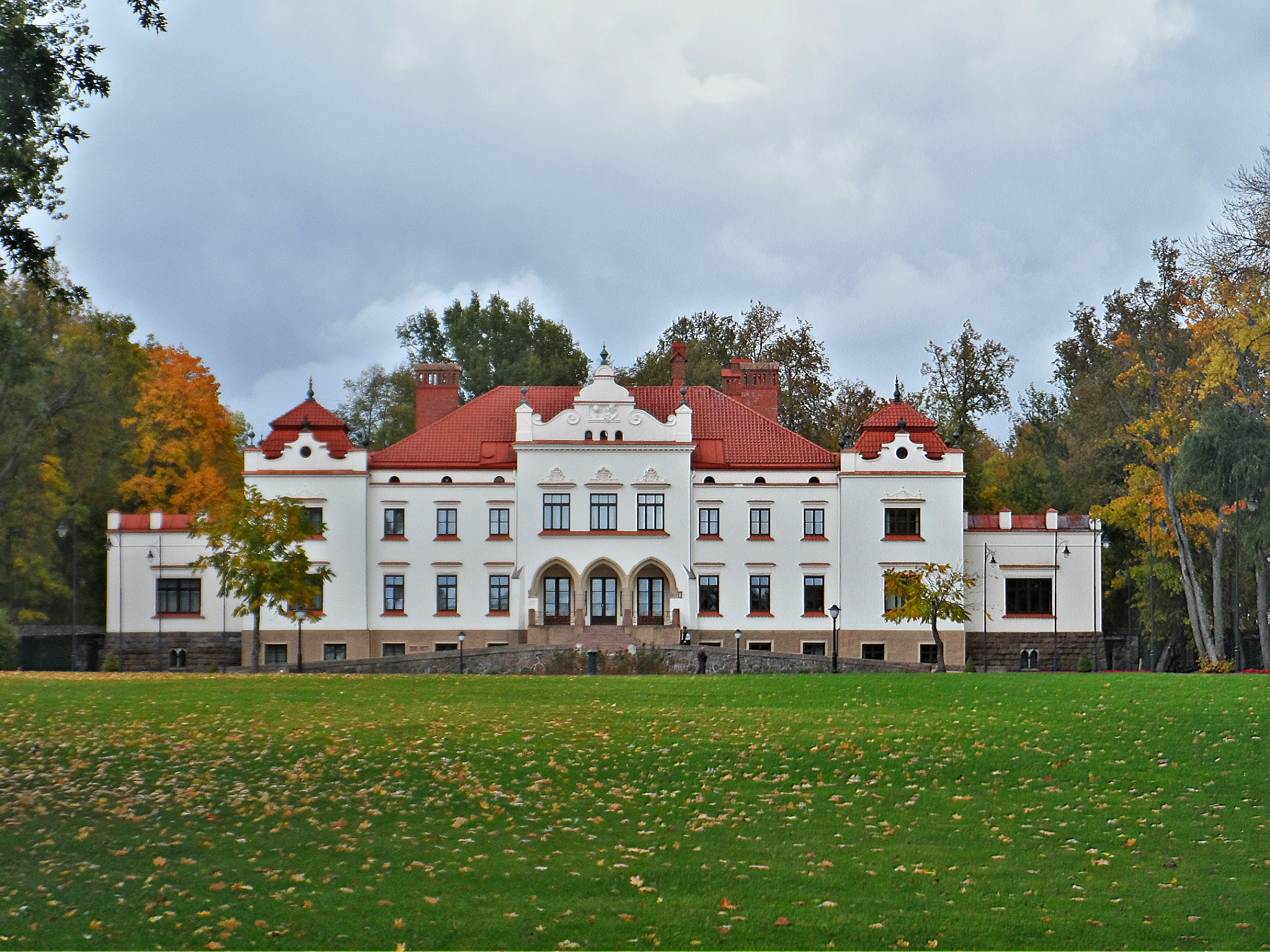
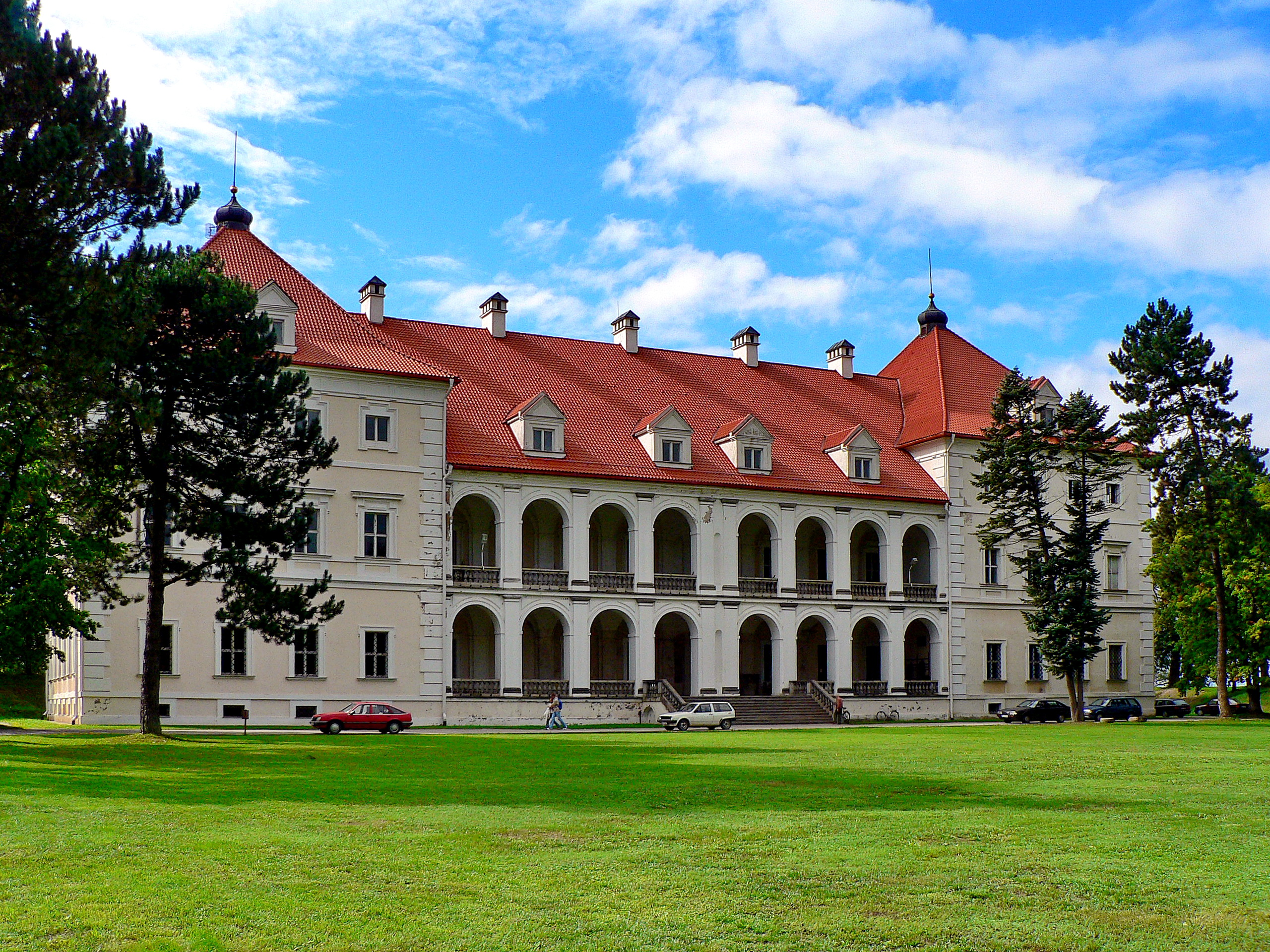
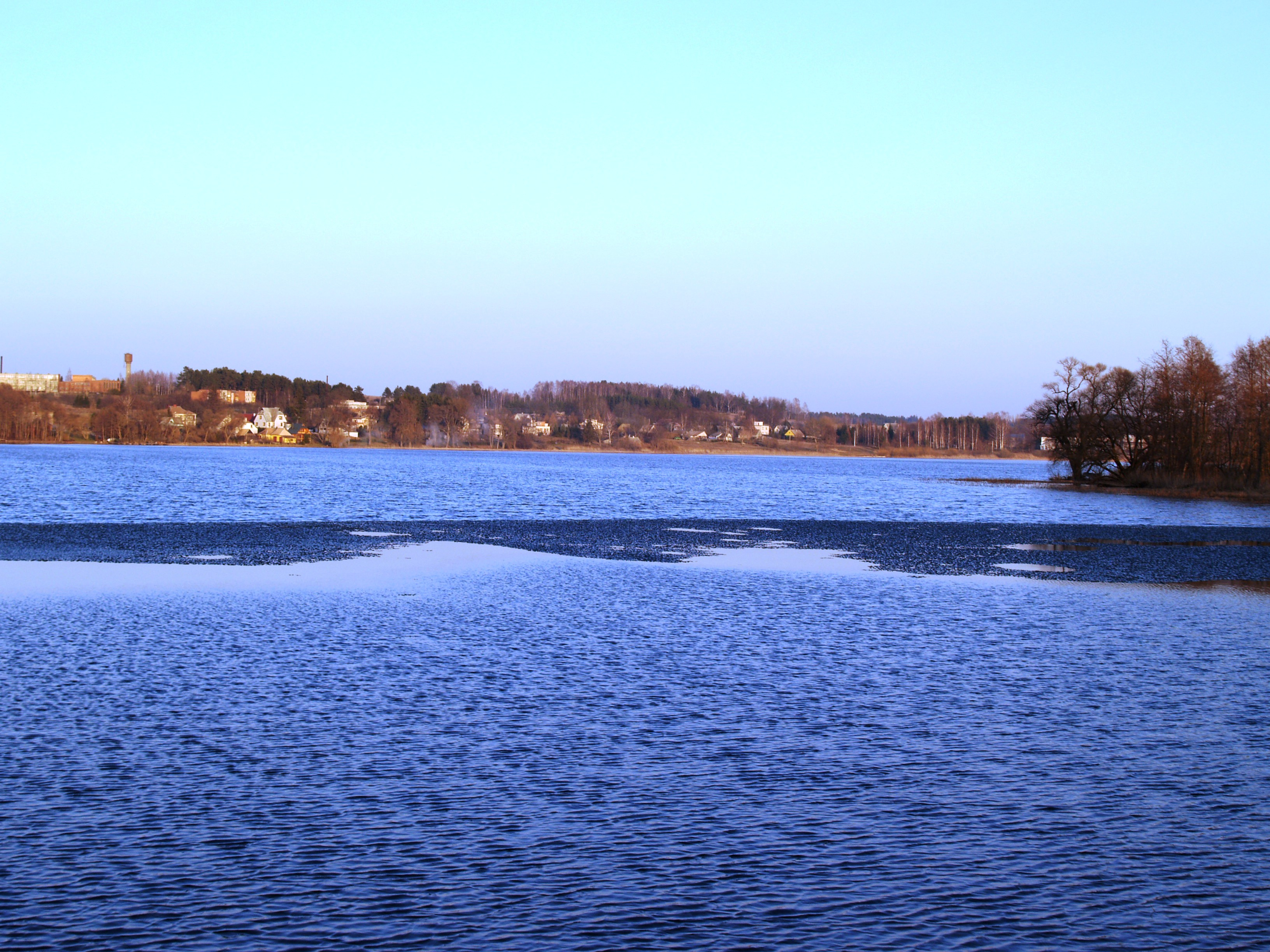
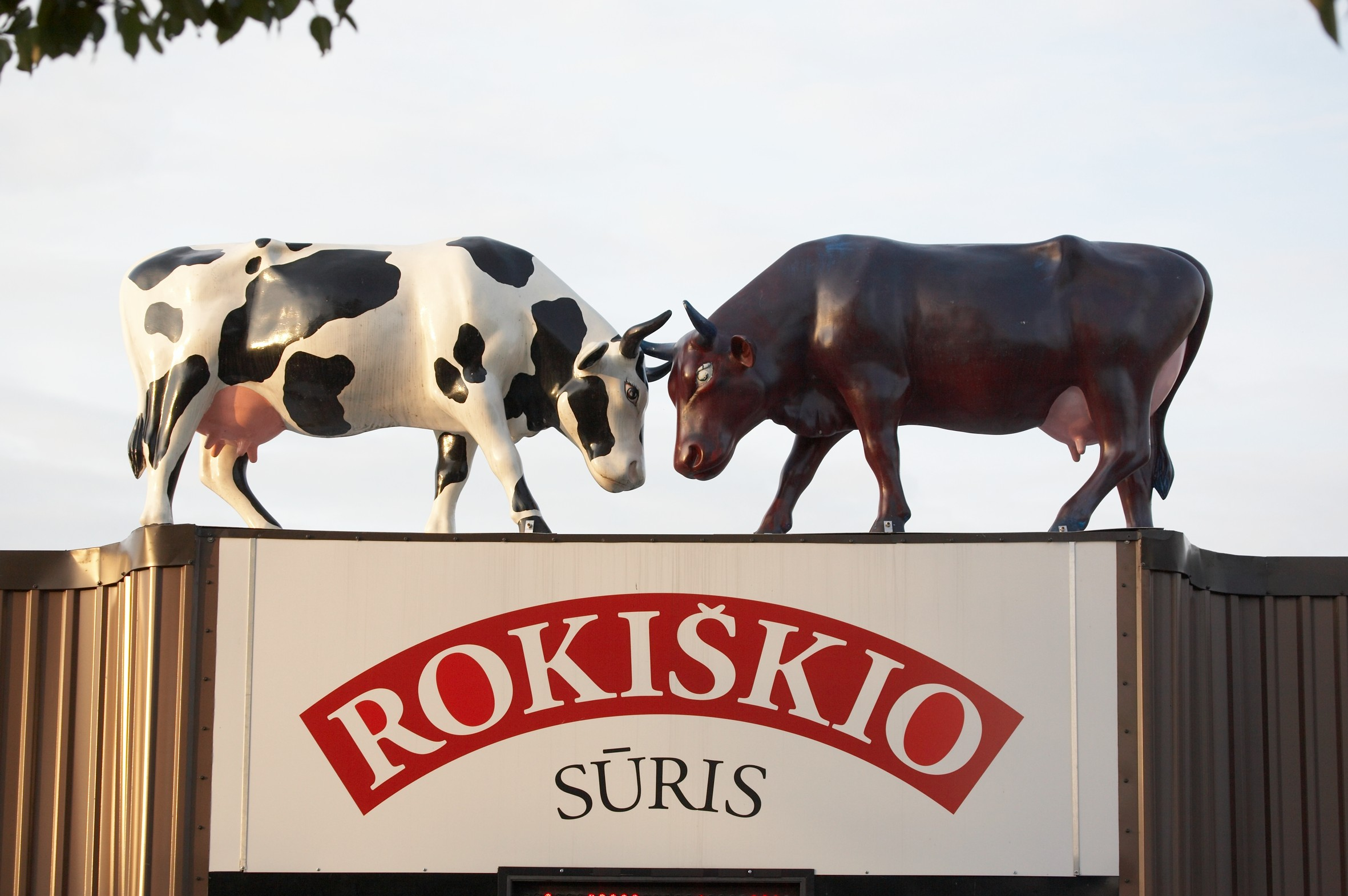
- From the top to bottom-right: Panevėžys, largest city in county, Rokiškis Manor, Biržai Castle, Sartai lake, Rokiškio sūris, largest dairy company in Lithuania

- Flag Coat of arms

- Location of Panevėžys County
- Country: Lithuania
- Administrative centre: Panevėžys
- Municipalities: List: Biržai district municipality; Kupiškis district municipality; Panevėžys city municipality; Panevėžys district municipality; Pasvalys district municipality; Rokiškis district municipality

Area
  - Total: 7,878 km^{2} (3,042 sq mi)
- (12.1% of the area of Lithuania)

Population (2020-01-01)
  - Total: 211,189
  - Rank: 5th of 10 (8.4% of the population of Lithuania)
  - Density: 26.81/km^{2} (69.43/sq mi)

GDP
  - Total: €3.8 billion (2023) · 5th
- Time zone: UTC+2 (EET)
  - Summer (DST): UTC+3 (EEST)
- ISO 3166 code: LT-PN
- HDI (2022): 0.850 very high · 6th

Panevėžys County (Lithuanian: Panevėžio apskritis) is one of ten counties in Lithuania. It is in the north-east of the country, and its capital is Panevėžys. On 1 July 2010, the county administration was abolished, and since that date, Panevėžys County remains as a territorial and statistical unit.

== History ==
Historical documents from the 16th century mention Panevėžys as an administrative region.

== Municipalities ==
Panevėžys County comprises the following municipalities:

Biržai district municipality
Kupiškis district municipality
Panevėžys city municipality
Panevėžys district municipality
Pasvalys district municipality
Rokiškis district municipality

== Geography ==
Panevėžys county is the fourth largest county in Lithuania:

- 202 km^{2} cities and towns;
- 145 km^{2} factories and roads;
- 4822 km^{2} farmland;
- 2109 km^{2} forests;
- 200 km^{2} lakes and streams;
- 406 km^{2} other.

Panevėžys County borders with Latvia, and also with Lithuanian counties of Utena, Vilnius, Kaunas and Šiauliai.

== Tourism ==
The region offers 9 hotels and 7 country inns for tourists and travellers. There are 8 tourist agencies and 3 tourist information centers catering to the public.
