= List of rivers of Lithuania =

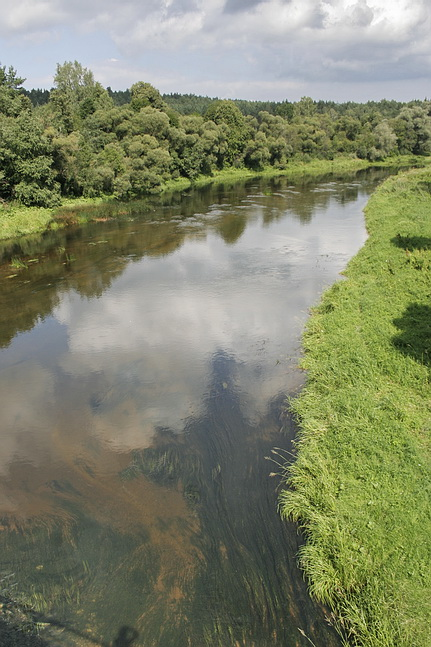
Šventoji River near Vepriai

Rivers of Lithuania are typical lowland rivers: they are slow, they make meanders, and the valleys are wide. Because of abundant precipitation, the river net is dense: on the average 0.99 km of rivers flow in 1 km² of the territory. However, the rivers are not evenly distributed. The highest density is in the Samogitian Highlands where it rains more often and in the northern Lithuania where the soil has clay and it does not allow the water to drain underground. The lowest density is in the southeastern Lithuania where the soil has a lot sand and the rainwater quickly ooze into the underground.

Almost 70% (some 49,600 km^{2}) of the territory of Lithuania are drained by the Neman River and its tributaries. The other five river basins are small and located nears the borders: Mūša-Nemunėlis (Lielupe; 8,976 km²), Venta (5,140 km²), Daugava (1,857 km²), small rivers flowing into the Baltic Sea (2,523 km²) and Pregolya (54 km²). During the winter all rivers freeze over. In the spring almost all rivers flood from melting snow and ice. However, usually only in the Neman River delta the water bursts out of the valley. Nowadays floods are controlled by dams and also due to drainage most rivers have lower water levels than they used to have. In the western Lithuania rivers tend to irregularly flooded during the fall because of excessive rains. In the eastern Lithuania rivers tend to discharge a constant amount of water because they are regulated by flow-through lakes and sandy soil, which quickly absorbs any excess rain or snow water.

During the Soviet times (1945-1990) rivers suffered much damage because of drainage. Many swamps were drained and now they cannot feed the rivers anymore. Other smaller rivers were straightened and turned into drainage canals.

Lithuania counts around 29 thousand watercourses longer than 0.25 km. The total length of all these watercourses would be around 65,000 km. The number of rivers and rivulets longer than 3 km has been calculated very precisely – 4,418. 758 rivers are longer than 10 km. Lithuania has 21 rivers longer than 100 km (62 mi):

== Longest rivers ==
| # | Name | Length (km) | | Mouth | Most important cities |
| # | Name | Total | In Lithuania | Mouth | Most important cities |
|---|---|---|---|---|---|
| 1 | Nemunas | 937 | 475 | Curonian Lagoon | Hrodna, Druskininkai, Alytus, Kaunas, Sovetsk |
| 2 | Neris | 510 | 235 | Nemunas | Vilnius, Kernavė, Jonava, Kaunas |
| 3 | Venta | 346 | 161 | Baltic Sea | Venta, Kuldīga, Ventspils |
| 4 | Šešupė | 298 | 209 | Nemunas | Marijampolė, Kudirkos Naumiestis, Krasnoznamensk |
| 5 | Šventoji | 246 | 246 | Neris | Anykščiai, Kavarskas, Ukmergė |
| 6 | Nevėžis | 209 | 209 | Nemunas | Panevėžys, Kėdainiai |
| 7 | Merkys | 203 | 190 | Nemunas | Baltoji Vokė, Merkinė |
| 8 | Minija | 202 | 202 | Nemunas Delta | Salantai, Gargždai, Priekulė |
| 9 | Nemunėlis | 199 | 160 | Lielupe | Bauska |
| 10 | Dysna | 173 | 58 | Daugava | |
| 11 | Jūra | 172 | 172 | Nemunas | Rietavas, Tauragė |
| 12 | Mūša | 157 | 140 | Lielupe | Bauska |
| 13 | Lėvuo | 145 | 145 | Mūša | |
| 14 | Šušvė | 135 | 135 | Nevėžis | |
| 15 | Dubysa | 131 | 131 | Nemunas | Šiauliai, Ariogala |
| 16 | Širvinta | 129 | 129 | Šventoji River | Širvintos |
| 17 | Švėtė | 118 | 50 | Lielupe | Žagarė |
| 18 | Šešuvis | 115 | 115 | Jūra | |
| 19 | Kotra River | 109 | 24 | Nemunas | |
| 20 | Mituva | 102 | 102 | Nemunas | Jurbarkas |
| 21 | Bartuva | 101 | 55 | Baltic Sea | Skuodas |

The Virvyčia (99.7 km) is just shy of the 100 km limit. The length of the Žeimena is an object of discussion; it could be up to 114 km.

Note: length in Lithuania also includes the length of rivers when they serve as borders with neighboring countries.

== See also ==
- List of drainage basins of Lithuania
