= Upytė (disambiguation) =

Upytė (in Lithuanian 'rivulet, little river') could refer to several Lithuanian toponyms:

Settlements

- Upytė, a village in Panevėžys District Municipality, a center of Upytė Eldership
- Upytė, Kaunas, a village Kaunas District Municipality
- Upytė, Vilnius, a former hamlet, now a Vilnius city part

Rivers

- Upytė (river in Panevėžys District Municipality), a tributary of the Nevėžis in Panevėžys District Municipality
- Upytė (river in Kėdainiai District Municipality), a tributary of the Nevėžis in Kėdainiai District Municipality
- Upytė (river in Kaunas District Municipality), a tributary of the Nevėžis in Kaunas District Municipality
- Upytė (Tatula tributary), a tributary of the Tatula in Biržai District Municipality and Pasvalys District Municipality
- Upytė (Dubysa tributary), a tributary of the Dubysa in Raseiniai District Municipality

Other

- Upytė Hillfort, a hillfort in Panevėžys District Municipality
- Upytė Land, an ancient Samogitian land

== See also ==
- Upyna (disambiguation)
