= Ringužė =

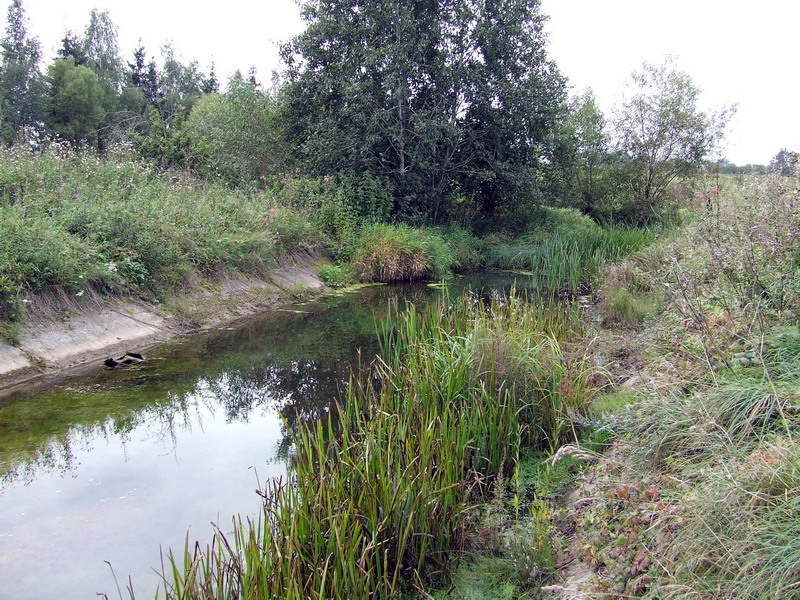

Location
- Country: Lithuania
- Region: Biržai district municipality, Panevėžys County

Physical characteristics
- Mouth: Upytė
  - coordinates: 56°8′25″N 24°37′18″E
- Length: 21 km (13 mi)
- Basin size: 16 km^{2} (6.2 sq mi)

Basin features
- Progression: Upytė→ Tatula→ Mūša→ Lielupe→ Baltic Sea

Ringužė is a river of Biržai district municipality, Panevėžys County, northern Lithuania. It flows for 21 kilometres (13 mi) and has a basin area of 16 km^{2} (6.2 sq mi).
