= Vabala =

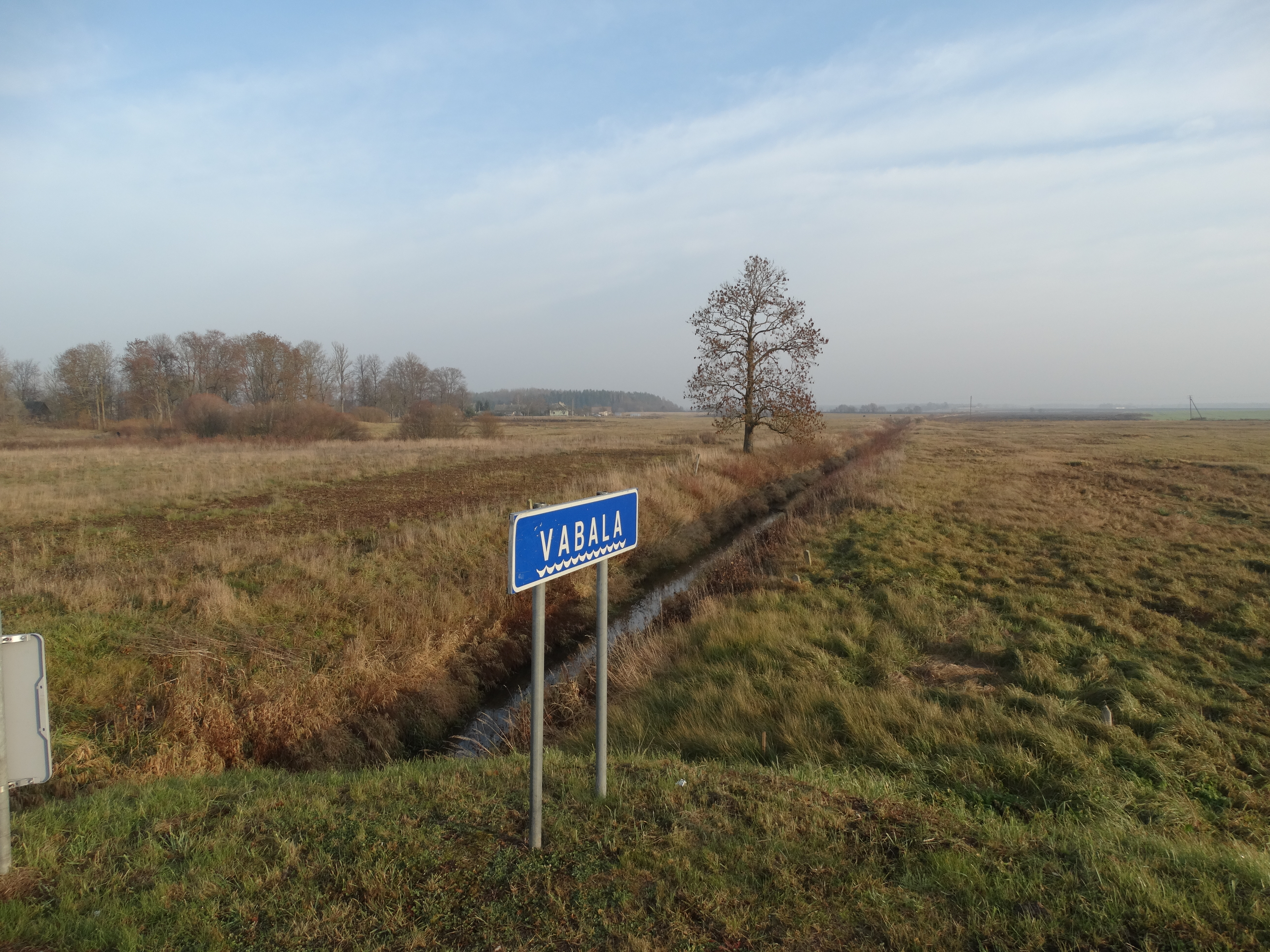

Location
- Country: Lithuania
- Region: Biržai district municipality, Panevėžys County

Physical characteristics
- Mouth: Tatula
  - coordinates: 55°58′54″N 24°43′16″E

Basin features
- Progression: Tatula→ Mūša→ Lielupe→ Baltic Sea

Vabala is a river of Biržai district municipality, Panevėžys County, northern Lithuania. It is a right tributary of the Tatula.
