= Geography of Lithuania =

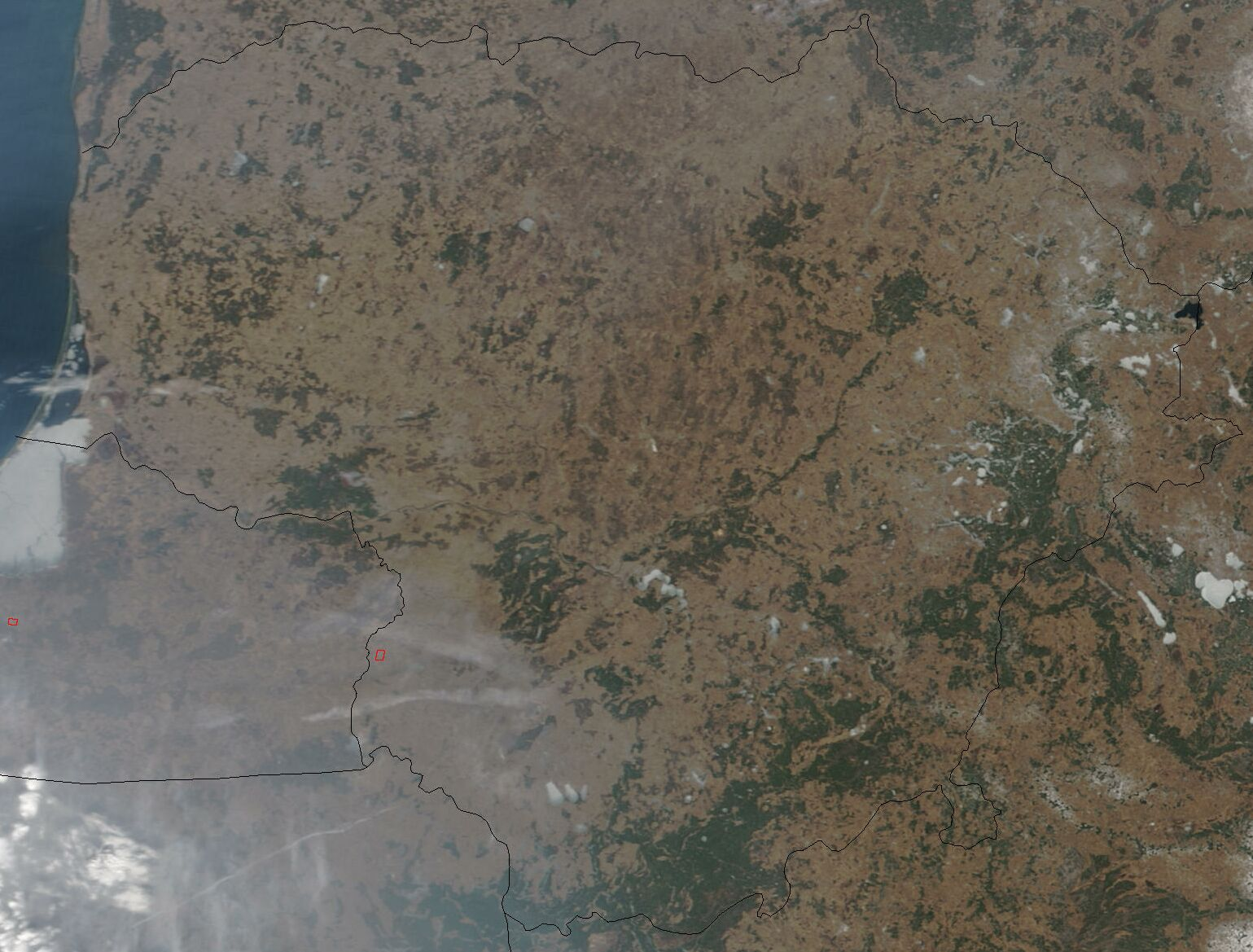
- Continent: Europe
- Region: Northern Europe
- Coordinates: 54°54′24″N 25°19′12″E
- Area
  - Total: 65,300 km^{2} (25,200 sq mi)
  - Land: 95.99%
  - Water: 4.01%
- Coastline: 262 km (163 mi)
- Borders: Total land borders: 1,574 km (978 mi)
- Highest point: Aukštojas Hill; 294 m (965 ft)
- Lowest point: Baltic Sea; 0 meters
- Longest river: Nemunas; 917 km (570 mi)
- Largest lake: Lake Drūkšiai; 44.79 km^{2} (17.29 mi^{2})
- Exclusive economic zone: 7,031 km^{2} (2,715 mi^{2})

Lithuania is one of the countries in the Baltic region of Europe. The most populous of the Baltic states, Lithuania has 262 km (163 mi) of coastline consisting of the continental coast and the "Curonian Spit" coast. Lithuania's major warm-water port of Klaipėda lies at the narrow mouth of Curonian Lagoon, a shallow lagoon extending south to Kaliningrad and separated from the Baltic sea by Curonian Spit, where Kuršių Nerija National Park was established for its remarkable sand dunes.

The Neman River and some of its tributaries are used for internal shipping (in 2000, 89 inland ships carried 900,000 tons of cargo, which is less than 1% of the total goods traffic).

Situated between 56.27 and 53.53 latitudes and 20.56 and 26.50 longitudes, Lithuania is glacially flat, except for morainic hills in the western uplands and eastern highlands no higher than 300 metres. The terrain is marked by numerous small lakes and swamps, and a mixed forest zone covers over 33% of the country. The growing season lasts 169 days in the east and 202 days in the west, with most farmland consisting of sandy- or clay-loam soils. Limestone, clay, sand, and gravel are Lithuania's primary natural resources, but the coastal shelf offers perhaps 1,600,000 m^{3} (10 Mbbl) of oil deposits, and the southeast could provide high yields of iron ore and granite.

== Geographical position ==
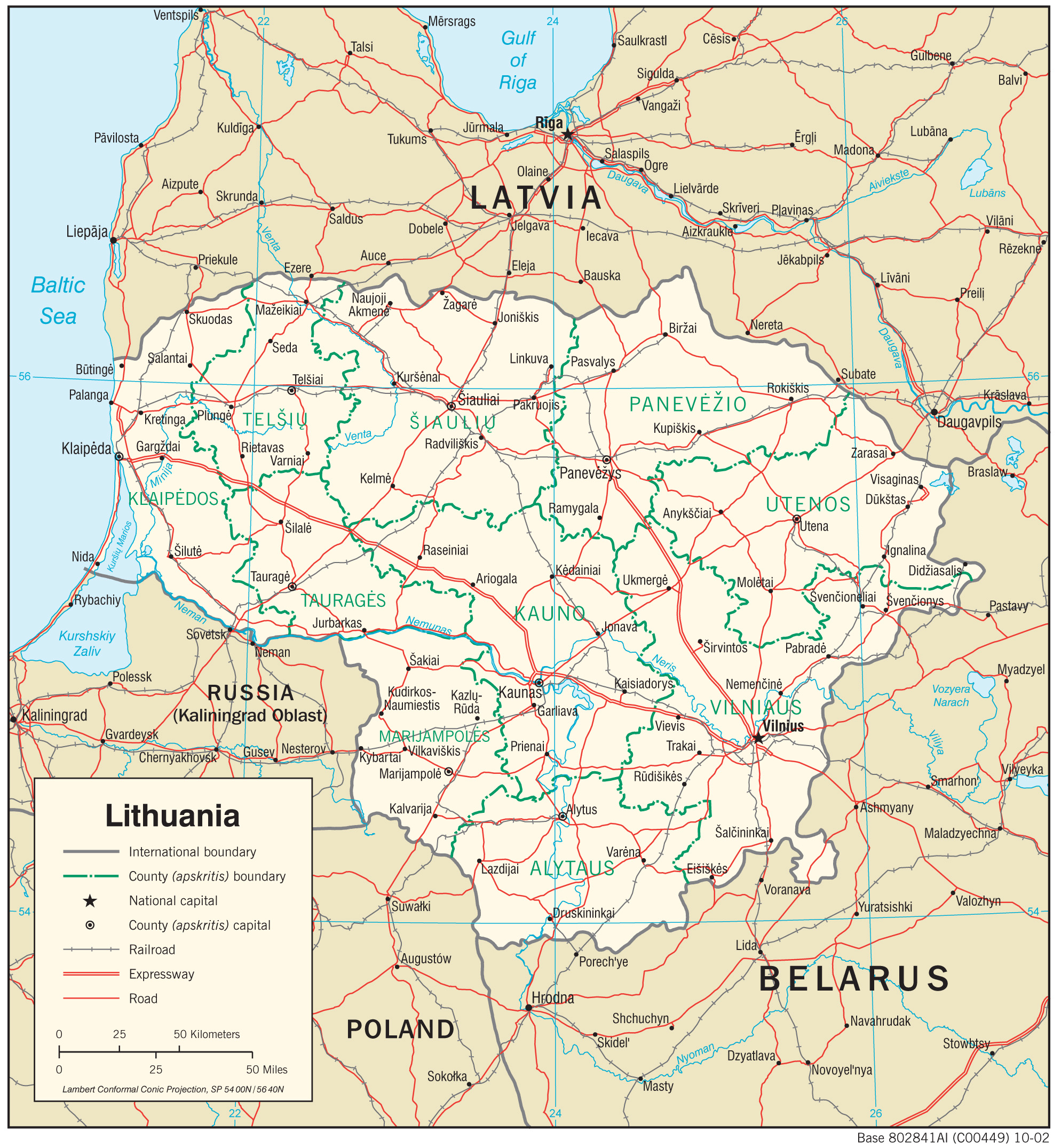
Political map of Lithuania

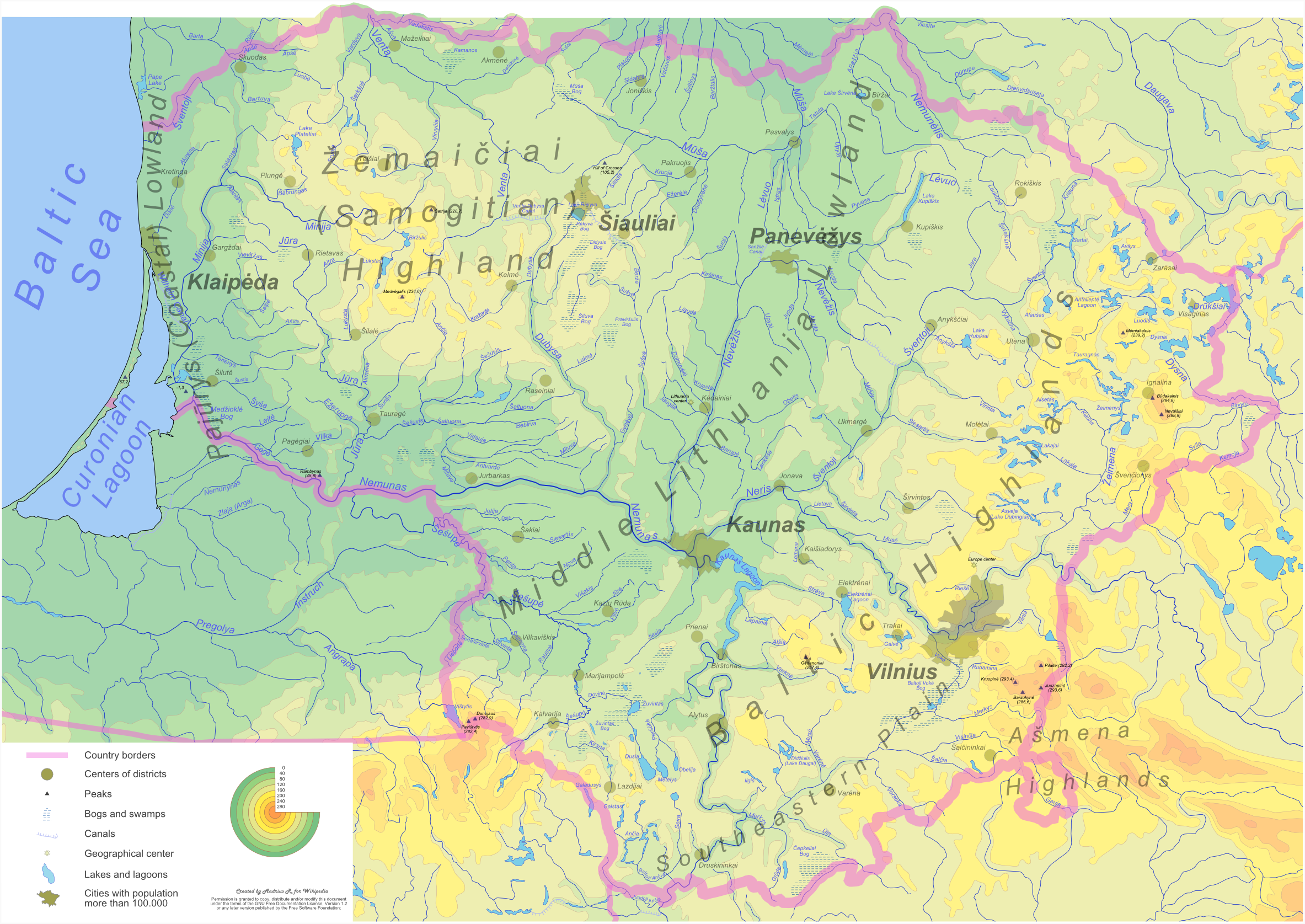
Physical map of Lithuania

Lithuania is situated on the eastern shore of the Baltic Sea. Lithuania's boundaries have changed several times since 1918, but they have been stable since 1945. Currently, Lithuania covers an area of about 65,300 km^{2} (25,200 mi^{2}). It is larger than Belgium, Denmark, Latvia, Estonia, the Netherlands, Slovakia, Slovenia or Switzerland. Lithuania borders Latvia on the north, Belarus on the east and south, and Poland and the Kaliningrad region of Russia on the southwest. The Eastern border together with Latvia in the South of its East comes along with the Krokuva-Vilnius-Veliky Novgorod route with it chiefly within the territory. It is a country of gently rolling hills, many forests, rivers and streams, and lakes. Its principal natural resource is agricultural land.

Lithuania's northern neighbor is Latvia. The two countries share a border that extends 453 kilometres. Lithuania's eastern border with Belarus is longer, stretching 502 kilometers. The border with Poland on the south is relatively short, only 91 kilometers, but it is very busy because of international traffic. Lithuania also has a 227-kilometer border with Russia. Russian territory adjacent to Lithuania is Kaliningrad Oblast, which is the northern part of the former German East Prussia, including the city of Kaliningrad. Finally, Lithuania has 108 kilometers of Baltic seashore with an ice-free harbor at Klaipėda. The Baltic coast offers sandy beaches and pine forests and attracts thousands of vacationers.

According to some geographers, the geographical midpoint of Europe is just north of Lithuania's capital, Vilnius.

=== Major coordinates ===
In terms of latitude or climate fifteen degrees (corresponding to the longitude or an hour fifteen degrees, except the polar climate sums being 7°30´ in latitude) Lithuania situates within the 52°30´-N - 67°30´-N latitude, that is northwards from Southend latitude, together with the North Sea major body, the Far North of Germany, Siberia. It situates in the southern quarter of the climate fifteen degrees, stretching northwards from the southern mark of the climate fifteen degrees further than in nearly one tenth or the sum of <1°30´, that is kind of an edge zone of the climate fifteen degrees, being generally boggy in the western Belarus, and on the 54°-N latitude the one tenth zone is marked by the greatest bog in Lithuania the Čepkeliai Marsh.

With the Eastern Hemisphere core longitude on the 67°30´-E, the hour or its longitude fifteen degrees that set on Lithuania are 15°-E - 30°-E (Greenwich, London) longitude, the core of which coming on the 22°30´-E longitude also marks the western one fourth, or the sum of 45° in the West of the Eastern Hemisphere if marking it with the Cape Verde archipelago and the Transantarctic Mountains. The 22°30´-E longitude comes in the West of Lithuania, with the river Jūra (pronounced as in Euro except the ending vowel) meaning sea locally flowing on the mark. Tilsit (Kaliningrad Oblast), Telšiai as the Greek thalassa situate in the western one fourth of the Eastern Hemisphere, although Talsi (Latvia) situate eastwards from the mark. The rivers Šešupė, Šešuvis, Šušvė plus Šyša situate in the sum of approximately 2°30´ longitude or one sixth of an hour fifteen degrees (šeši - six in Lithuanian), in the both sides of the 22°30´-E mark.

== Topography and drainage ==
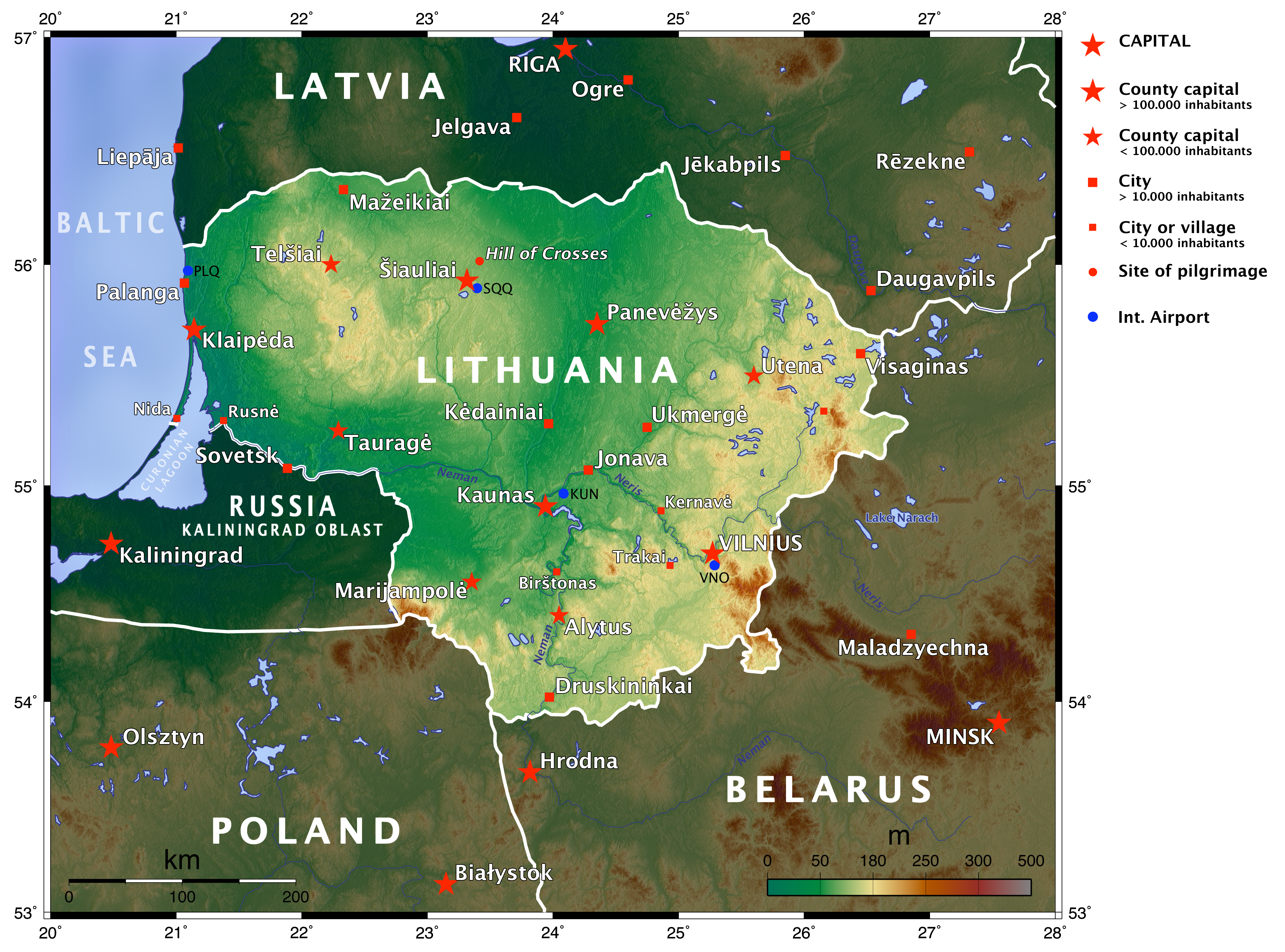
Topographical map of Lithuania

Lithuania lies at the edge of the North European Plain. Its landscape was shaped by the glaciers of the last Ice Age, which retreated about 25,000–22,000 years BP (Before Present). Lithuania's terrain is an alternation of moderate lowlands and highlands. The highest elevation is 297.84 meters above sea level, found in the eastern part of the republic and separated from the uplands of the western region of Samogitia by the fertile plains of the southwestern and central regions. The landscape is punctuated by 2,833 lakes larger than 1 hectare (2.5 acres) and 1,600 smaller ponds. The majority of the lakes are found in the eastern part of the country. Lithuania also has 758 rivers longer than 10 kilometres (6.2 mi). The largest river is the Nemunas (total length 917 km (570 mi)), which originates in Belarus. The other larger waterways are the Neris (510 km (320 mi)), Venta (346 km (215 mi)), and Šešupė (298 km (185 mi)) rivers. However, only 600 kilometres (370 mi) of Lithuania's rivers are navigable.

Once a heavily forested land, Lithuania's territory today consists of only 32.8 percent woodlands—primarily pine, spruce, and birch forests. Ash and oak are very scarce. The forests are rich in mushrooms and berries, as well as a variety of plants.

== Climate ==
Köppen–Geiger climate classification map at 1-km resolution for Lithuania 1991–2020

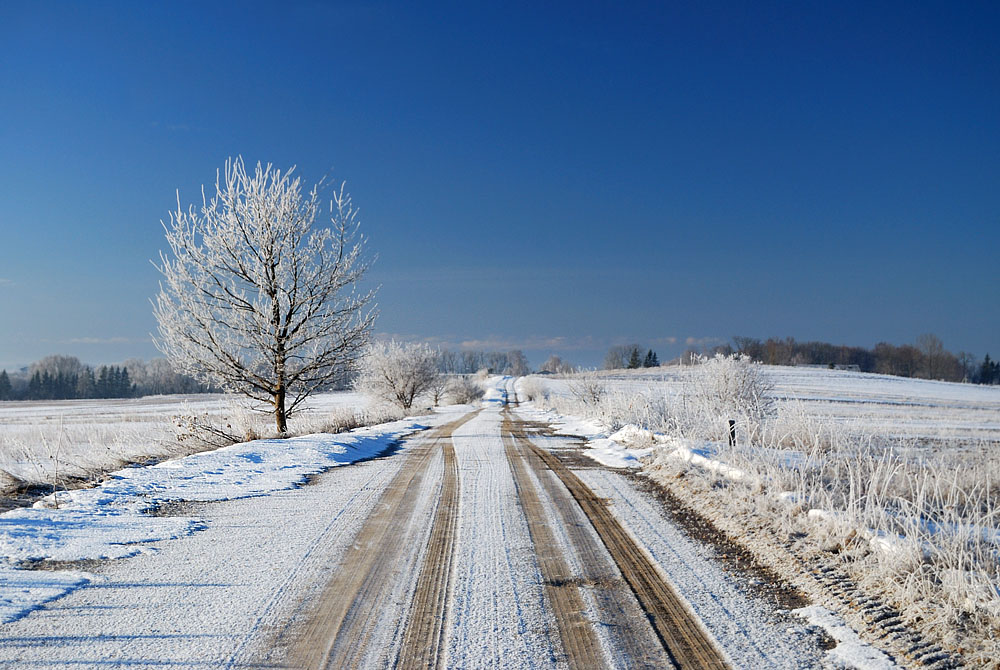
Winter landscape in Lithuania

Lithuania has a humid continental climate (Dfb in the Köppen climate classification). Average temperatures on the coast are 1.6 °C (34.9 °F) in January and 17.8 °C (64.0 °F) in July. In Vilnius the average temperatures are −3.7 °C (25.3 °F) in January and 18.1 °C (64.6 °F) in July. Simply speaking, 20 °C (68 °F) is frequent on summer days and 14 °C (57.2 °F) at night. Temperatures occasionally reach 30 or 35 °C (86 or 95 °F) in summer. Winters when easterly flows from Siberia predominate, like 1941–42, 1955–56 and 1984–85, are very cold, whereas winters dominated by westerly maritime airflows like 1924–25, 1960–61 and 1988–89 are mild with temperatures above freezing a normal occurrence. −20 °C or −4 °F occurs almost every winter. Winter extremes are −34 °C (−29 °F) at the coast and −43 °C (−45 °F) in the east of Lithuania. The average annual precipitation is 717 millimetres (28.2 in) on the coast, 900 mm (35.4 in) in Samogitia highlands, and 490 mm (19.3 in) in the eastern part of the country. Snow occurs every year, it can be snowing from October to April. In some years sleet can fall in September or May. The growing season lasts 202 days in the western part of the country and 169 days in the eastern part. Severe storms are rare in the eastern part of Lithuania and common nearer the coast.

The longest measured temperature records from the Baltic area cover about 250 years. The data show that there were warm periods during the latter half of the eighteenth century and that the nineteenth century was a relatively cool period. An early twentieth century warming culminated in the 1930s, followed by a smaller cooling that lasted until the 1960s. A warming trend has persisted since then.

Lithuania experienced a drought in 2002, causing forest and peat bog fires. The country suffered along with the rest of Northwestern Europe during a heatwave in the summer of 2006.

=== Examples ===
==== General averages ====
Climate data for Lithuania (general)
Month	Jan	Feb	Mar	Apr	May	Jun	Jul	Aug	Sep	Oct	Nov	Dec	Year
Record high °C (°F)	14.9 (58.8)	16.5 (61.7)	25.5 (77.9)	31.0 (87.8)	34.0 (93.2)	36.3 (97.3)	37.5 (99.5)	37.4 (99.3)	35.1 (95.2)	26.0 (78.8)	18.5 (65.3)	15.6 (60.1)	37.5 (99.5)
Mean daily maximum °C (°F)	−1.7 (28.9)	−1.3 (29.7)	2.3 (36.1)	9.4 (48.9)	16.5 (61.7)	19.9 (67.8)	20.9 (69.6)	20.6 (69.1)	15.8 (60.4)	9.9 (49.8)	3.5 (38.3)	−0.1 (31.8)	9.5 (49.1)
Daily mean °C (°F)	−3.9 (25.0)	−3.5 (25.7)	−0.1 (31.8)	5.5 (41.9)	11.6 (52.9)	15.2 (59.4)	16.7 (62.1)	16.1 (61.0)	12.2 (54.0)	7.0 (44.6)	1.8 (35.2)	−1.7 (28.9)	6.2 (43.2)
Mean daily minimum °C (°F)	−6.3 (20.7)	−6.6 (20.1)	−2.8 (27.0)	1.5 (34.7)	7.0 (44.6)	10.5 (50.9)	12.2 (54.0)	11.9 (53.4)	8.3 (46.9)	4.0 (39.2)	0.1 (32.2)	−3.7 (25.3)	2.7 (36.9)
Record low °C (°F)	−40.6 (−41.1)	−42.9 (−45.2)	−37.5 (−35.5)	−23.0 (−9.4)	−6.8 (19.8)	−2.8 (27.0)	0.9 (33.6)	−2.9 (26.8)	−6.3 (20.7)	−19.5 (−3.1)	−23.0 (−9.4)	−34.0 (−29.2)	−42.9 (−45.2)
Average precipitation mm (inches)	36.2 (1.43)	30.1 (1.19)	33.9 (1.33)	42.9 (1.69)	52.0 (2.05)	69.0 (2.72)	76.9 (3.03)	77.0 (3.03)	60.3 (2.37)	49.9 (1.96)	50.4 (1.98)	47.0 (1.85)	625.5 (24.63)
Source 1: Records of Lithuanian climate
Source 2: Weatherbase

==== Cities ====
Climate data for Vilnius (1991–2020 normals, sun 1961–1990, extremes 1777-present)
Month	Jan	Feb	Mar	Apr	May	Jun	Jul	Aug	Sep	Oct	Nov	Dec	Year
Record high °C (°F)	11.0 (51.8)	14.4 (57.9)	20.0 (68.0)	29.0 (84.2)	31.8 (89.2)	34.2 (93.6)	36.5 (97.7)	34.9 (94.8)	33.1 (91.6)	24.5 (76.1)	15.5 (59.9)	10.5 (50.9)	36.5 (97.7)
Mean maximum °C (°F)	4.9 (40.8)	5.7 (42.3)	13.1 (55.6)	22.4 (72.3)	26.7 (80.1)	28.8 (83.8)	30.8 (87.4)	30.3 (86.5)	25.4 (77.7)	18.3 (64.9)	11.1 (52.0)	6.1 (43.0)	32.1 (89.8)
Mean daily maximum °C (°F)	−1.7 (28.9)	−0.5 (31.1)	4.4 (39.9)	12.6 (54.7)	18.4 (65.1)	21.7 (71.1)	23.8 (74.8)	23.1 (73.6)	17.4 (63.3)	10.2 (50.4)	3.7 (38.7)	−0.3 (31.5)	11.2 (52.2)
Daily mean °C (°F)	−3.9 (25.0)	−3.1 (26.4)	0.9 (33.6)	7.6 (45.7)	13.0 (55.4)	16.4 (61.5)	18.7 (65.7)	17.9 (64.2)	13.0 (55.4)	7.0 (44.6)	1.8 (35.2)	−2.2 (28.0)	7.3 (45.1)
Mean daily minimum °C (°F)	−5.9 (21.4)	−5.6 (21.9)	−2.7 (27.1)	2.6 (36.7)	7.5 (45.5)	11.1 (52.0)	13.6 (56.5)	12.7 (54.9)	8.5 (47.3)	3.7 (38.7)	−0.1 (31.8)	−4.1 (24.6)	3.5 (38.3)
Mean minimum °C (°F)	−19.3 (−2.7)	−17.5 (0.5)	−10.8 (12.6)	−4.2 (24.4)	0.1 (32.2)	4.9 (40.8)	8.1 (46.6)	6.8 (44.2)	1.1 (34.0)	−3.8 (25.2)	−8.7 (16.3)	−14.1 (6.6)	−22.0 (−7.6)
Record low °C (°F)	−37.2 (−35.0)	−35.8 (−32.4)	−29.6 (−21.3)	−14.4 (6.1)	−4.4 (24.1)	0.1 (32.2)	3.5 (38.3)	1.0 (33.8)	−4.8 (23.4)	−14.4 (6.1)	−22.8 (−9.0)	−30.5 (−22.9)	−37.2 (−35.0)
Average precipitation mm (inches)	38.9 (1.53)	34.4 (1.35)	37.0 (1.46)	46.2 (1.82)	52.1 (2.05)	72.7 (2.86)	79.3 (3.12)	75.8 (2.98)	65.2 (2.57)	51.5 (2.03)	51.5 (2.03)	49.2 (1.94)	653.8 (25.74)
Average precipitation days	21.7	18.4	17.5	10.2	12.4	11.7	11.4	10.5	9.7	13.5	16.7	21.2	174.9
Mean monthly sunshine hours	37	70	117	165	242	231	220	217	141	93	33	25	1,591
Average ultraviolet index	0	1	2	3	5	6	6	5	3	2	1	0	3
Source: WMO (avg high and low) NOAA (sun, extremes, and mean temperatures), Météo Climat and Weather Atlas

Climate data for Kaunas (1991-2020 normals, extremes 1901-present)
Month	Jan	Feb	Mar	Apr	May	Jun	Jul	Aug	Sep	Oct	Nov	Dec	Year
Record high °C (°F)	11.7 (53.1)	14.8 (58.6)	23.3 (73.9)	28.6 (83.5)	31.4 (88.5)	32.9 (91.2)	34.9 (94.8)	35.3 (95.5)	33.3 (91.9)	23.9 (75.0)	16.7 (62.1)	11.1 (52.0)	35.3 (95.5)
Mean maximum °C (°F)	5.8 (42.4)	6.3 (43.3)	12.8 (55.0)	22.5 (72.5)	26.5 (79.7)	28.2 (82.8)	30.7 (87.3)	30.5 (86.9)	25.3 (77.5)	18.3 (64.9)	11.4 (52.5)	6.7 (44.1)	32.0 (89.6)
Mean daily maximum °C (°F)	−0.8 (30.6)	0.0 (32.0)	4.8 (40.6)	12.9 (55.2)	18.6 (65.5)	21.6 (70.9)	23.5 (74.3)	23.3 (73.9)	17.9 (64.2)	11.0 (51.8)	4.6 (40.3)	0.8 (33.4)	11.8 (53.2)
Daily mean °C (°F)	−3.5 (25.7)	−2.9 (26.8)	1.3 (34.3)	7.9 (46.2)	13.0 (55.4)	16.3 (61.3)	18.0 (64.4)	18.1 (64.6)	13.3 (55.9)	7.5 (45.5)	2.6 (36.7)	−1.4 (29.5)	7.9 (46.2)
Mean daily minimum °C (°F)	−6.1 (21.0)	−6.0 (21.2)	−2.2 (28.0)	2.7 (36.9)	7.3 (45.1)	10.9 (51.6)	13.0 (55.4)	12.6 (54.7)	8.7 (47.7)	4.1 (39.4)	0.6 (33.1)	−3.1 (26.4)	3.8 (38.8)
Mean minimum °C (°F)	−19.3 (−2.7)	−17.0 (1.4)	−9.9 (14.2)	−3.4 (25.9)	0.6 (33.1)	5.0 (41.0)	8.3 (46.9)	7.0 (44.6)	1.5 (34.7)	−2.9 (26.8)	−7.0 (19.4)	−12.2 (10.0)	−21.3 (−6.3)
Record low °C (°F)	−35.8 (−32.4)	−36.3 (−33.3)	−26.3 (−15.3)	−12.0 (10.4)	−3.7 (25.3)	0.1 (32.2)	2.1 (35.8)	0.3 (32.5)	−3.0 (26.6)	−13.7 (7.3)	−21.0 (−5.8)	−30.6 (−23.1)	−36.3 (−33.3)
Average precipitation mm (inches)	53.0 (2.09)	41.4 (1.63)	44.0 (1.73)	42.0 (1.65)	57.5 (2.26)	71.8 (2.83)	95.8 (3.77)	84.2 (3.31)	56.1 (2.21)	69.2 (2.72)	50.2 (1.98)	48.2 (1.90)	710.2 (27.96)
Average precipitation days	12.29	10.77	10.40	8.50	9.25	10.76	10.72	10.51	8.46	10.76	10.65	11.21	124.53
Mean monthly sunshine hours	40.3	67.8	127.1	174.0	251.1	264.0	257.3	238.7	159.0	99.2	42.0	27.9	1,748.4
Source 1: World Meteorological Organization NOAA (extremes)
Source 2: Hong Kong Observatory (sun only) Météo Climat (normal temps & precipitation)

Climate data for Klaipėda (1991-2020 normals, extremes 1929-present)
Month	Jan	Feb	Mar	Apr	May	Jun	Jul	Aug	Sep	Oct	Nov	Dec	Year
Record high °C (°F)	11.7 (53.1)	15.4 (59.7)	18.6 (65.5)	28.9 (84.0)	31.2 (88.2)	33.8 (92.8)	34.0 (93.2)	36.6 (97.9)	30.4 (86.7)	22.9 (73.2)	15.4 (59.7)	11.5 (52.7)	36.6 (97.9)
Mean maximum °C (°F)	6.1 (43.0)	5.7 (42.3)	10.6 (51.1)	21.0 (69.8)	26.2 (79.2)	27.6 (81.7)	30.0 (86.0)	29.2 (84.6)	23.9 (75.0)	17.5 (63.5)	11.1 (52.0)	7.5 (45.5)	31.3 (88.3)
Mean daily maximum °C (°F)	1.3 (34.3)	1.3 (34.3)	4.5 (40.1)	10.8 (51.4)	16.0 (60.8)	19.3 (66.7)	22.1 (71.8)	22.3 (72.1)	17.8 (64.0)	11.9 (53.4)	6.3 (43.3)	3.2 (37.8)	11.6 (52.9)
Daily mean °C (°F)	−0.7 (30.7)	−0.9 (30.4)	1.8 (35.2)	7.1 (44.8)	11.8 (53.2)	15.5 (59.9)	18.4 (65.1)	18.5 (65.3)	14.3 (57.7)	9.0 (48.2)	4.2 (39.6)	1.2 (34.2)	8.5 (47.3)
Mean daily minimum °C (°F)	−2.9 (26.8)	−3.1 (26.4)	−1.0 (30.2)	3.1 (37.6)	7.5 (45.5)	11.6 (52.9)	14.7 (58.5)	14.6 (58.3)	10.8 (51.4)	6.2 (43.2)	2.3 (36.1)	−0.8 (30.6)	5.3 (41.5)
Mean minimum °C (°F)	−13.5 (7.7)	−12.0 (10.4)	−7.5 (18.5)	−2.6 (27.3)	0.6 (33.1)	5.9 (42.6)	9.4 (48.9)	9.4 (48.9)	3.8 (38.8)	−1.4 (29.5)	−5.1 (22.8)	−9.0 (15.8)	−16.4 (2.5)
Record low °C (°F)	−32.0 (−25.6)	−33.4 (−28.1)	−20.8 (−5.4)	−12.8 (9.0)	−5.2 (22.6)	−2.8 (27.0)	5.2 (41.4)	2.9 (37.2)	−3.3 (26.1)	−7.5 (18.5)	−14.6 (5.7)	−24.1 (−11.4)	−33.4 (−28.1)
Average precipitation mm (inches)	73.4 (2.89)	50.7 (2.00)	47.1 (1.85)	36.2 (1.43)	43.7 (1.72)	59.7 (2.35)	74.1 (2.92)	96.8 (3.81)	89.5 (3.52)	108.3 (4.26)	90.1 (3.55)	79.9 (3.15)	853.1 (33.59)
Average precipitation days	14.77	11.35	10.05	7.45	7.59	9.22	9.42	11.67	11.55	14.86	14.49	15.39	138.72
Mean monthly sunshine hours	34	65	122	180	264	285	274	252	167	100	40	28	1,811
Source 1: Météo Climat
Source 2: NOAA

Climate data for Šiauliai (1991–2020 normals, extremes 1937-present)
Month	Jan	Feb	Mar	Apr	May	Jun	Jul	Aug	Sep	Oct	Nov	Dec	Year
Record high °C (°F)	10.5 (50.9)	13.3 (55.9)	21.0 (69.8)	26.6 (79.9)	30.4 (86.7)	32.1 (89.8)	35.0 (95.0)	35.7 (96.3)	30.1 (86.2)	23.3 (73.9)	16.9 (62.4)	13.4 (56.1)	35.7 (96.3)
Mean maximum °C (°F)	5.9 (42.6)	6.2 (43.2)	12.9 (55.2)	21.9 (71.4)	26.3 (79.3)	28.2 (82.8)	30.2 (86.4)	29.6 (85.3)	24.1 (75.4)	17.7 (63.9)	10.9 (51.6)	6.6 (43.9)	31.4 (88.5)
Mean daily maximum °C (°F)	−0.4 (31.3)	−0.1 (31.8)	4.7 (40.5)	12.4 (54.3)	17.9 (64.2)	21.2 (70.2)	23.6 (74.5)	22.9 (73.2)	17.3 (63.1)	10.7 (51.3)	4.5 (40.1)	0.8 (33.4)	11.4 (52.5)
Daily mean °C (°F)	−2.5 (27.5)	−2.9 (26.8)	1.1 (34.0)	7.4 (45.3)	12.4 (54.3)	16.0 (60.8)	18.5 (65.3)	17.9 (64.2)	13.0 (55.4)	7.6 (45.7)	2.4 (36.3)	−1.2 (29.8)	7.6 (45.7)
Mean daily minimum °C (°F)	−4.9 (23.2)	−5.7 (21.7)	−2.5 (27.5)	2.3 (36.1)	6.8 (44.2)	10.8 (51.4)	13.4 (56.1)	12.8 (55.0)	8.7 (47.7)	4.3 (39.7)	0.4 (32.7)	−3.2 (26.2)	3.6 (38.5)
Mean minimum °C (°F)	−17.3 (0.9)	−17.2 (1.0)	−11.0 (12.2)	−3.7 (25.3)	0.1 (32.2)	4.9 (40.8)	8.5 (47.3)	7.2 (45.0)	1.6 (34.9)	−3.0 (26.6)	−7.2 (19.0)	−12.7 (9.1)	−21.3 (−6.3)
Record low °C (°F)	−36.0 (−32.8)	−36.4 (−33.5)	−27.0 (−16.6)	−13.2 (8.2)	−3.5 (25.7)	0.1 (32.2)	5.2 (41.4)	2.1 (35.8)	−5.7 (21.7)	−8.5 (16.7)	−19.3 (−2.7)	−31.1 (−24.0)	−36.4 (−33.5)
Average precipitation mm (inches)	44.2 (1.74)	35.1 (1.38)	36.3 (1.43)	33.4 (1.31)	54.4 (2.14)	71.0 (2.80)	77.5 (3.05)	68.8 (2.71)	53.8 (2.12)	71.9 (2.83)	52.3 (2.06)	45.4 (1.79)	642.7 (25.30)
Average precipitation days	11.32	9.86	9.45	7.12	8.65	10.04	10.12	10.36	9.07	12.17	11.25	11.91	121.50
Mean monthly sunshine hours	37	65	125	176	263	277	261	243	166	100	42	29	1,784
Source 1: Météo Climat
Source 2: NOAA (extremes and sun)

Climate data for Panevėžys (1991−2020 normals, extremes 1959−present)
Month	Jan	Feb	Mar	Apr	May	Jun	Jul	Aug	Sep	Oct	Nov	Dec	Year
Record high °C (°F)	11.8 (53.2)	10.6 (51.1)	18.1 (64.6)	26.6 (79.9)	29.5 (85.1)	32.5 (90.5)	35.3 (95.5)	34.0 (93.2)	28.4 (83.1)	21.7 (71.1)	13.6 (56.5)	10.3 (50.5)	35.3 (95.5)
Mean daily maximum °C (°F)	−0.3 (31.5)	1.5 (34.7)	4.3 (39.7)	12.4 (54.3)	17.0 (62.6)	21.5 (70.7)	23.8 (74.8)	22.9 (73.2)	17.5 (63.5)	11.3 (52.3)	4.0 (39.2)	−0.3 (31.5)	11.3 (52.3)
Daily mean °C (°F)	−2.5 (27.5)	−1.3 (29.7)	0.8 (33.4)	7.7 (45.9)	11.5 (52.7)	16.4 (61.5)	18.3 (64.9)	17.3 (63.1)	12.7 (54.9)	8.0 (46.4)	1.9 (35.4)	−2.4 (27.7)	7.4 (45.3)
Mean daily minimum °C (°F)	−4.7 (23.5)	−4.0 (24.8)	−2.6 (27.3)	2.9 (37.2)	6.0 (42.8)	11.3 (52.3)	12.8 (55.0)	11.7 (53.1)	7.9 (46.2)	4.6 (40.3)	−0.3 (31.5)	−4.5 (23.9)	3.4 (38.2)
Record low °C (°F)	−27.4 (−17.3)	−27.7 (−17.9)	−17.0 (1.4)	−6.5 (20.3)	−2.5 (27.5)	1.9 (35.4)	5.8 (42.4)	0.0 (32.0)	−3.8 (25.2)	−8.0 (17.6)	−21.5 (−6.7)	−30.3 (−22.5)	−30.3 (−22.5)
Average precipitation mm (inches)	49.8 (1.96)	33.8 (1.33)	36.6 (1.44)	43.1 (1.70)	64.8 (2.55)	67.5 (2.66)	103.1 (4.06)	54.2 (2.13)	40.5 (1.59)	56.3 (2.22)	44.6 (1.76)	40.4 (1.59)	634.7 (24.99)
Average precipitation days (≥ 1 mm)	11.1	11.9	10.1	8.3	9.1	10.8	9.7	10.4	7.8	11.0	11.2	11.1	122.5
Source: NOAA

Climate data for Alytus
Month	Jan	Feb	Mar	Apr	May	Jun	Jul	Aug	Sep	Oct	Nov	Dec	Year
Mean daily maximum °C (°F)	−2.2 (28.0)	−1.1 (30.0)	3.9 (39.0)	11.1 (52.0)	18.3 (64.9)	21.1 (70.0)	22.2 (72.0)	22.2 (72.0)	16.7 (62.1)	11.1 (52.0)	4.4 (39.9)	−0.6 (30.9)	10.6 (51.1)
Daily mean °C (°F)	−5.0 (23.0)	−4.4 (24.1)	0.0 (32.0)	6.1 (43.0)	12.2 (54.0)	15.6 (60.1)	16.7 (62.1)	16.7 (62.1)	12.2 (54.0)	7.2 (45.0)	2.2 (36.0)	−2.8 (27.0)	6.4 (43.5)
Mean daily minimum °C (°F)	−7.8 (18.0)	−7.8 (18.0)	−3.9 (25.0)	1.1 (34.0)	6.1 (43.0)	10.0 (50.0)	11.7 (53.1)	10.6 (51.1)	7.2 (45.0)	3.3 (37.9)	0.0 (32.0)	−5.0 (23.0)	2.1 (35.8)
Average rainfall mm (inches)	41 (1.6)	27 (1.1)	36 (1.4)	41 (1.6)	56 (2.2)	74 (2.9)	80 (3.1)	70 (2.8)	60 (2.4)	48 (1.9)	51 (2.0)	50 (2.0)	634 (25.0)
Average precipitation days	8	9	14	16	16	12	13	14	12	14	8	7	143

== Environment ==
Concerned with environmental deterioration, Lithuanian governments have created several national parks and reservations. The country's flora and fauna have suffered, however, from an almost fanatical drainage of land for agricultural use. Environmental problems of a different nature were created by the development of environmentally unsafe industries. Air pollution problems exist mainly in the cities, such as Vilnius, Kaunas, Jonava, Mažeikiai, Elektrėnai, and Naujoji Akmenė—the sites of fertilizer and other chemical plants, an oil refinery, power station, and a cement factory.

Water quality has also been an issue. The city of Kaunas, with a population of about 400,000, had no water purification plant until 1999; sewage was sent directly into the Neman River. Tertiary wastewater treatment is scheduled to come on-line in 2007. River and lake pollution are other legacies of Soviet carelessness with the environment. The Courland Lagoon, for example, separated from the Baltic Sea by a strip of high dunes and pine forests, is about 85 percent contaminated. Beaches in the Baltic resorts, such as the well-known vacation area of Palanga, are frequently closed for swimming because of contamination. Forests affected by acid rain are found in the vicinity of Jonava, Mažeikiai, and Elektrėnai, which are the chemical, oil, and power-generation centers. Lithuania was among the first former Soviet republics to introduce environmental regulations. However, because of Moscow's emphasis on increasing production and because of numerous local violations, technological backwardness, and political apathy, serious environmental problems now exist.

Natural hazards: hurricane-force storms, blizzards, droughts, floods

Environment—current issues: contamination of soil and groundwater with petroleum products and chemicals at former Soviet military bases

Environment—international agreements:

- party to:

Air Pollution, Air Pollution-Nitrogen Oxides, Air Pollution-Persistent Organic Pollutants, Air Pollution-Sulphur 85, Air Pollution-Sulphur 94, Air Pollution-Volatile Organic Compounds, Biodiversity, Climate Change, Climate Change-Kyoto Protocol, Desertification, Endangered Species, Environmental Modification, Hazardous Wastes, Law of the Sea, Ozone Layer Protection, Ship Pollution, Wetlands

- signed, but not ratified:

== Natural resources ==
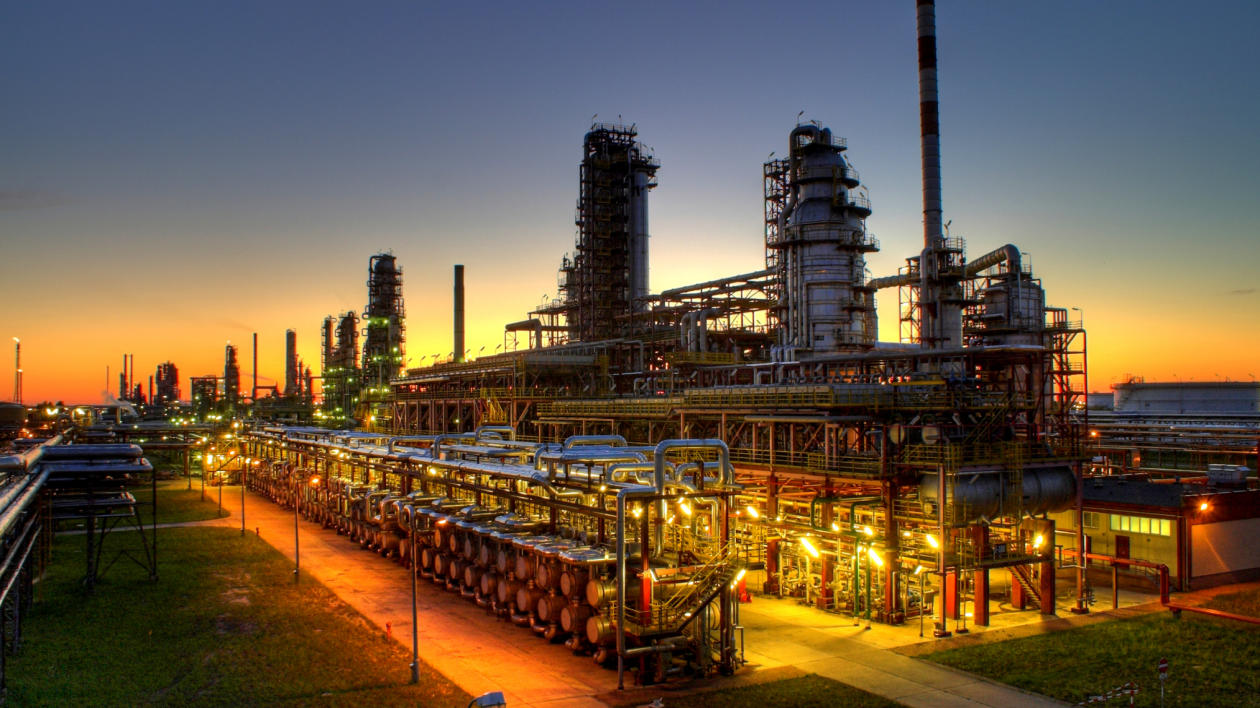
Oil refinery in Mažeikiai

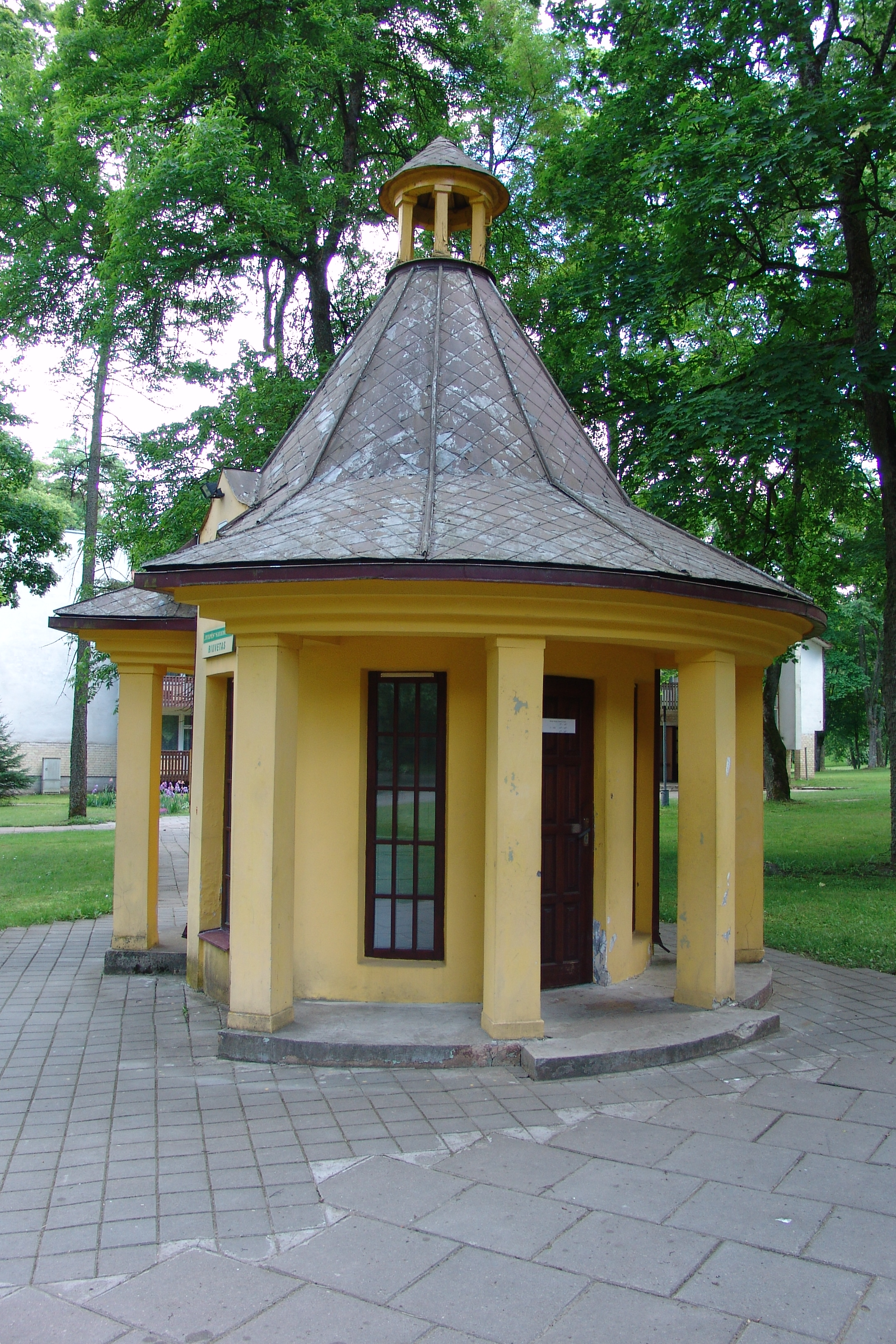
Mineral water spring in resort city Birštonas

Lithuania has an abundance of limestone, clay, quartz sand, gypsum sand, and dolomite, which are suitable for making high-quality cement, glass, and ceramics. There also is an ample supply of mineral water, but energy sources and industrial materials are all in short supply. Oil was discovered in Lithuania in the 1950s, but only a few wells operate, and all that do are located in the western part of the country. It is estimated that the Baltic Sea shelf and the western region of Lithuania hold commercially viable amounts of oil, but if exploited this oil would satisfy only about 20 percent of Lithuania's annual need for petroleum products for the next twenty years. Lithuania has a large amount of thermal energy along the Baltic Sea coast which could be used to heat hundreds of thousands of homes, as is done in Iceland. In addition, iron ore deposits have been found in the southern region of Lithuania. But commercial exploitation of these deposits probably would require strip mining, which is environmentally unsound. Moreover, exploitation of these resources will depend on Lithuania's ability to attract capital and technology from abroad.

Lithuania and Denmark are the only countries in Europe, which are fully equipped with fresh groundwater. The Lithuanians consume about 0.5 million cubic metres of water per day, which is only 12–14 percent of all explored fresh groundwater resources. Water quality in the country is very high and is determined by the fact that drinking water comes from deep layers that are protected from pollution on the surface of the earth. Drilling depth usually reaches 30–50 metres, but in Klaipėda Region it even reaches 250 metres. Consequently, Lithuania is one of very few European countries where groundwater is used for centralized water supply. With a large underground fresh water reserves, Lithuania exports mineral-rich water to other countries. Approved mineral water quantity is about 2.7 million cubic metres per year, while production is only 4–5 percent of all mineral water resources.

Lithuania's capital Vilnius is the only Baltic capital city that uses centralized water supplying from deep water springs, which are protected from pollution and has no nitrates or nitrites that are harmful to the human body. Water is cleaned without chemicals in Lithuania. About 20% of the consumed water in the state is a non-filtered very high quality water.

Natural resources: peat, arable land, amber.

Land use:

- arable land: 33.48%
- permanent crops: 0.47%
- other: 66.05% (2011)

Irrigated land: 13.4 km^{2} (2011)

Total renewable water resources: 24.9 km^{3} (2011)

== Area and boundaries ==
Interactive map showing land and maritime border of Lithuania

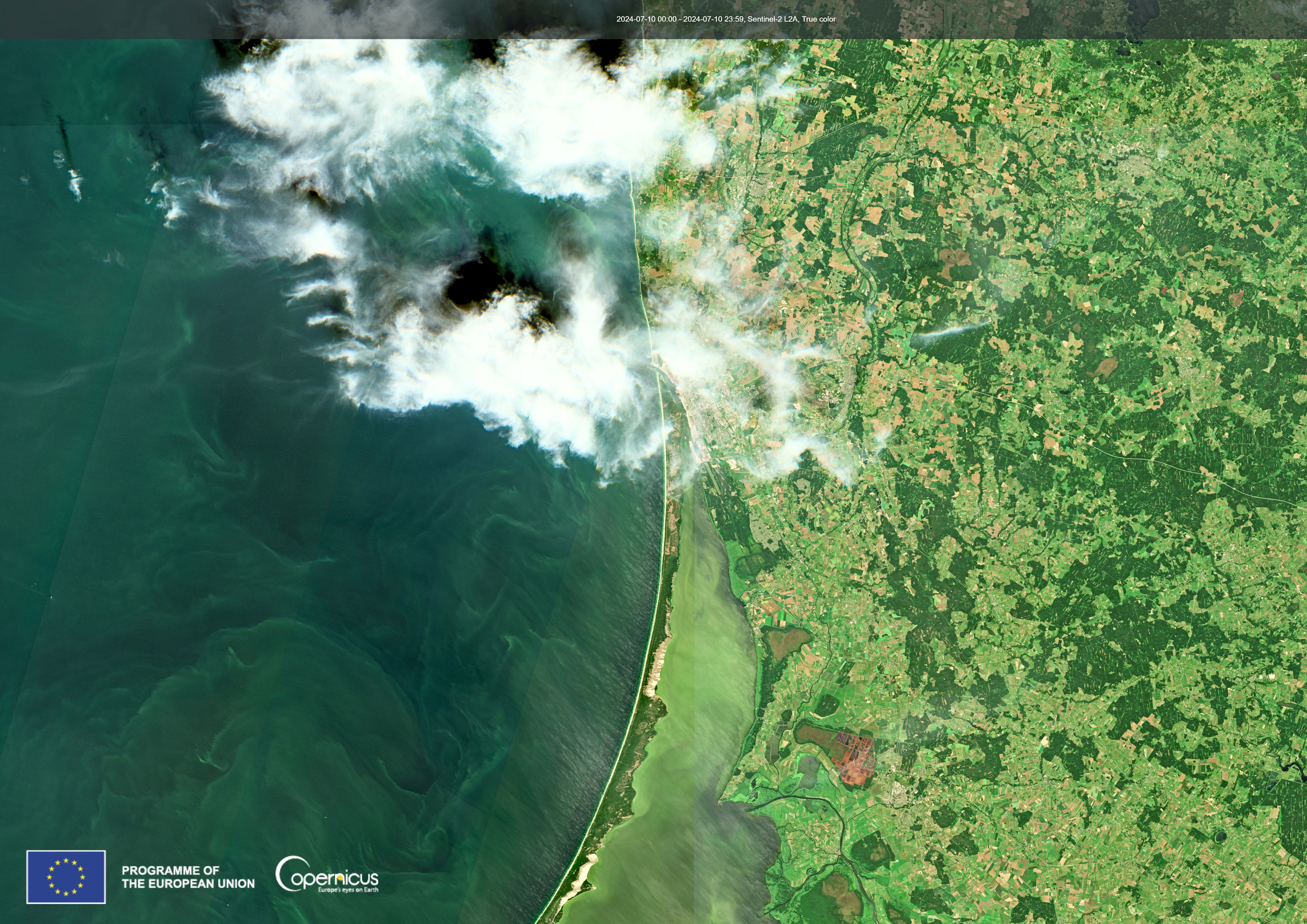
Lithuanian coastline with the Nemunas delta, Curonian lagoon and spit.

Area:

- Total: 65,300 km^{2}
- Land: 62,680 km^{2}
- Water: 2,620 km^{2}

Comparative area

- Australia comparative: slightly smaller (5.5%) than Tasmania
- Canada comparative: about 9% smaller than New Brunswick
- United Kingdom comparative: about 17% smaller than Scotland
- United States comparative: slightly larger (4%) than West Virginia

Land boundaries:

- Total: 1,574 km
- Border countries: Belarus 680 km, Latvia 576 km, Poland 91 km, Russia (Kaliningrad) 227 km

Coastline: 262 km (163 mi). The coastline consists of 20 kilometres from Klaipėda, 50 kilometres at Cape Nehrung, and 21 kilometres in the region of Palanga and the mouth of the Šventoji river. Lithuania Minor occupies two-thirds of the Lithuanian coast-line.

Maritime claims:

- Territorial sea: 12 nmi (22.2 km; 13.8 mi)
- Exclusive Economic Zone: 7,031 km^{2} (2,715 mi^{2}) with 12 nmi (22.2 km; 13.8 mi)

== Latitude and longitude ==
- Northern point: near former Lemkinė village on the shores of Nemunėlis in the Biržai district municipality 56°27′1″N 24°53′05″E
- Southern point: in the Varėna district municipality, in uninhabitable forest area, cadastrally belonging to village Musteika. 53°53′48″N 24°21′07″E The southernmost habitable place is in the village Ašašninkai, so called fraction Plaskiniškės.53°55′51″N 24°17′14″E
- Eastern point: near Vosiūnai village in the Ignalina district municipality 55°17′08″N 26°50′08″E
- Western point: Nida 55°16′51″N 20°57′18″E

Elevation extremes:

- Lowest point: Baltic Sea 0 m
- Highest point: Aukštojas Hill 294 metres (965 ft)

== See also ==
- List of protected areas of Lithuania
- Lithuania
