= Lithuanian Reserve Battalion =

Former Lithuanian military formation in the Russian Army (1917–18)

- Lietuvių atsargos batalionas
- Active: December 5, 1917 – April 8, 1918
- Country: Russian Republic
- Branch: Russian Army (1917)
- Type: Infantry
- Size: 600 (January 1918)

Commanders
- First and only commander: Jurgis Kubilius

The Lithuanian Reserve Battalion (Lithuanian: Lietuvių atsargos batalionas) was a Lithuanian unit of the Russian Army that operated in Smolensk from late 1917 to early 1918. This battalion was one of the first 20th-century Lithuanian military units, together with the Lithuanian Dragoon Half-Regiment.

In historiography, the unit has also been called the Lithuanian Reserve Battalion in Smolensk (Lithuanian: Lietuvių atsargos batalionas Smolenske).

== Formation ==
The unit began to be formed in late 1917 – early 1918 under the care of the Central Committee of the Lithuanian Soldiers' Union in Smolensk. Smolensk was the place where the Lithuanian Reserve Battalion was organised because it was further away from the Eastern Front. The city also had warehouses of war supplies and a large concentration of Lithuanian war refugees. The Lithuanian community in Smolensk supported the battalion with its own funds throughout its existence.

On 19 November 1917, the Ministry of War of Russia gave permission to form a Lithuanian infantry regiment. However, due to the beginning of the October coup, work briefly stopped and resumed only on December 5, when the commander of the Minsk military district ordered the formation of a Lithuanian reserve battalion that was 4 companies strong. This meant that instead of a regiment, only a reserve battalion was allowed to be formed. The commander of the Minsk military district also ordered that all of the district's Lithuanian soldiers be sent to the Lithuanian Reserve Battalion. The battalion actually started functioning only on December 15, when Jasaitis, the owner of the Vilija factory, gave horses, carriages, kitchen and other things to it. Colonel Jurgis Kubilius was appointed as the battalion's commander.

== Composition ==
From January 1918, the number of soldiers greatly increased and the 600-man strong battalion was fully formed that month. It had four infantry companies, supply and communications units. The soldiers were taught courses about Lithuanian language, Lithuanian history, geography, in addition to reading, writing, and arithmetic. The education was nationally oriented.

== History ==
Service in the battalion was difficult for the soldiers not only because of poverty but also because of the Bolshevik agitation led by R. Rasikas. The Bolshevik authorities demanded that an election of commanders be held and a battalion committee be elected. However, the Lithuanian soldiers behaved in a principled manner and elected all former commanding officers into their former positions. Dissatisfied with such behaviour by the soldiers, the Bolsheviks stopped providing supplies or paying salaries to the battalion. The officers lived and ate together with the soldiers.

After the announcement of the demobilization of the Russian army on 31 January 1918, an attempt was made by the Bolshevik authorities to include the Lithuanian Reserve Battalion in the army of Soviet Russia. Due to the refusal of the battalion command, the supply of food and ammunition was cut off to the battalion was cut off on February 8.

After failing to incite the battalion to join the ranks of the Red Army, the Bolsheviks began to threaten to liquidate it. Not wanting the soldiers to suffer, the Lithuanian officers decided to disband the battalion. On 5 March 1918, an order was received from the headquarters of the Minsk Military District to demobilize the battalion's soldiers, and a liquidation commission was appointed.

== Aftermath ==
Some of the soldiers went to Lithuania before April 8, most of whom joined the Lithuanian Army, while others transferred to the Red Army.

At least 18 future volunteers of the Lithuanian Army served in the Lithuanian Reserve Battalion: Divisional General Jurgis Kubilius, Colonel Mykolas Kalmantas, Lieutenant Colonel Kleopas Mikalauskas, Reserve Captains Liudas Žukauskas, Petras Šernas, Reserve Lieutenants Emilis Šneideraitis, Petras Gureckas, Reserve Officers Paulius Pranckūnas and Kazys Nasevičius, Reserve Corporals Bronius Grudzinskas and Jonas Keleris, Reserve Non-Commissioned Officers Stasys Butkus and Jonas Avėnas, Reserve Junior Non-commissioned Officer Stasys Čepauskas, Reserve Privates Petras Bugailiškis, Feliksas Zaremba, Jonas Butkys and Mykolas Paulavičius.

== Sources ==
- Gužas, Petras (1937). "Lietuvių pulkų steigimo komisijos darbas Smolenske". Karys (in Lithuanian). 37–38: 1042.
- Jurevičiūtė, Aušra (2018). "Lietuvių dalinių formavimas Rusijoje ir jų karių savanoriška tarnyba Lietuvos kariuomenėje 1918–1923 m." (PDF). Vytauto Didžiojo Karo Muziejus 2017 metais: Almanachas (in Lithuanian). Kaunas: 228–229.
- Vaičenonis, Jonas (2017). "Lietuvių atsargos batalionas". vle.lt (in Lithuanian).
