= Juodupė (Tatula) =

Location
- Country: Lithuania
- Region: Biržai district municipality, Panevėžys County

Physical characteristics
- Mouth: Tatula
  - coordinates: 56°10′40″N 24°37′55″E
- Length: 24.2 km (15.0 mi)
- Basin size: 68.5 km^{2} (26.4 sq mi)

Basin features
- Progression: Tatula→ Mūša→ Lielupe→ Baltic Sea

Juodupė is a river of Biržai district municipality, Panevėžys County, northern Lithuania. It flows for 24 kilometres (15 mi) and has a basin area of 68 km^{2} (26 sq mi).
