= Central Lithuania =

Central Lithuania may refer to:

- Republic of Central Lithuania, a short-lived Poland-dependent puppet state created in 1920 in the Vilnius Region
- The central region in the geography of Lithuania, around Kaunas, Kėdainiai, and Jonava
