= Jura River =

The Jura River may refer to:

- Jūra, river in Lithuania
- Jura River (Papua New Guinea), river near Agaun, Milne Bay Province, Papua New Guinea
- Jura River (California), a hypothetical ancient river in the California Mother Lode, named for the Jurassic Period
- Jura River (Paris), mythological river under Paris, France
