= Upytė (Tatula tributary) =

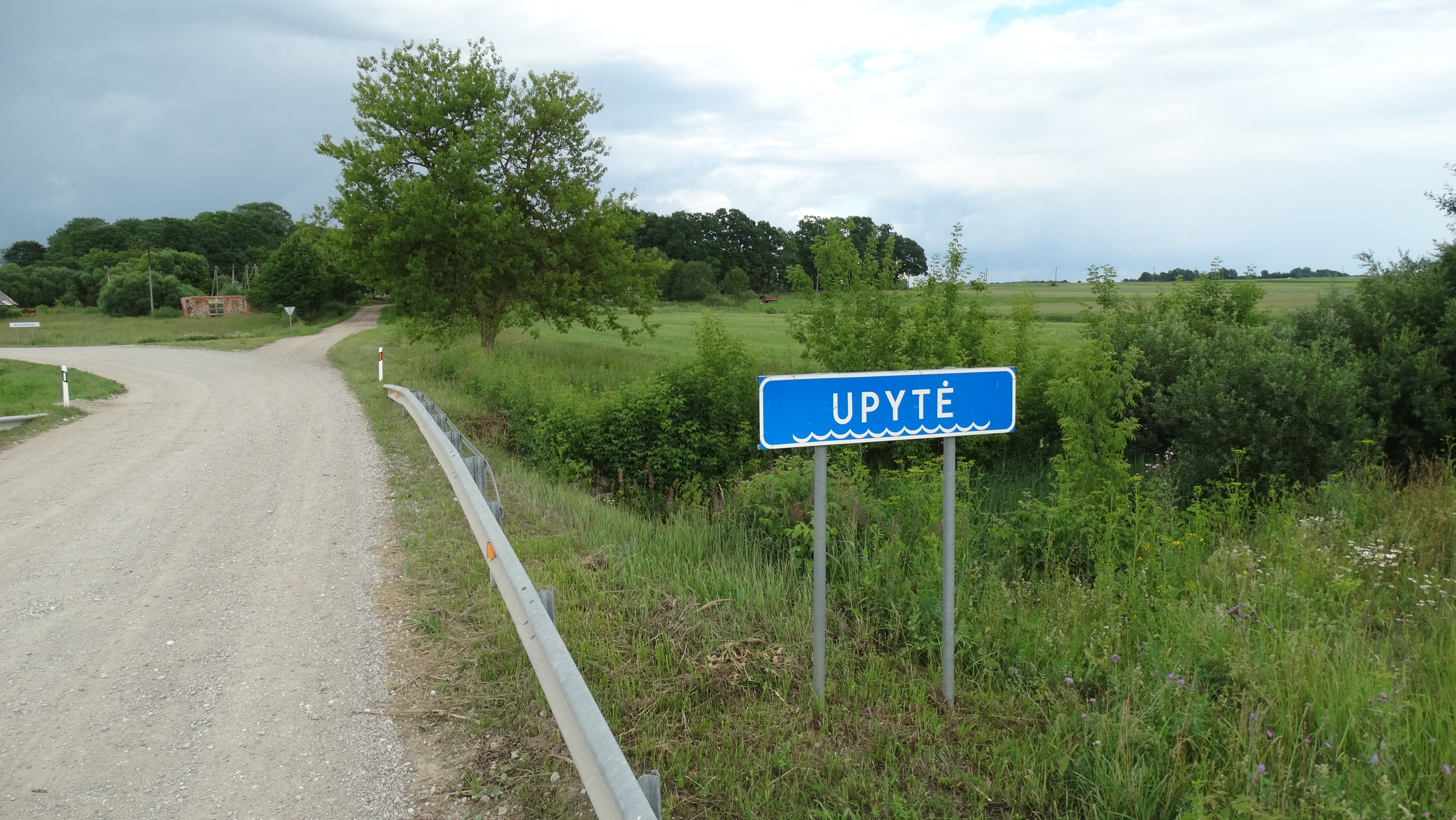

Location
- Country: Lithuania
- Region: Biržai district municipality, Panevėžys County

Physical characteristics
- Mouth: Tatula
  - coordinates: 56°10′6″N 24°34′28″E
- Length: 29 km (18 mi)
- Basin size: 100 km^{2} (39 sq mi)

Basin features
- Progression: Tatula→ Mūša→ Lielupe→ Baltic Sea
- Tributaries
  - right: Ringužė

Upytė is a river of Biržai district municipality, Panevėžys County, northern Lithuania. It flows for 29 kilometres (18 mi) and has a basin area of 100 km^{2} (39 sq mi).
