= List of drainage basins of Lithuania =

There are six major drainage basins in Lithuania: the rivers Neman (Lithuanian:Nemunas), Lielupe, Venta, Daugava, Pregolya, and a strip along the Baltic where rivers flow directly into the sea.

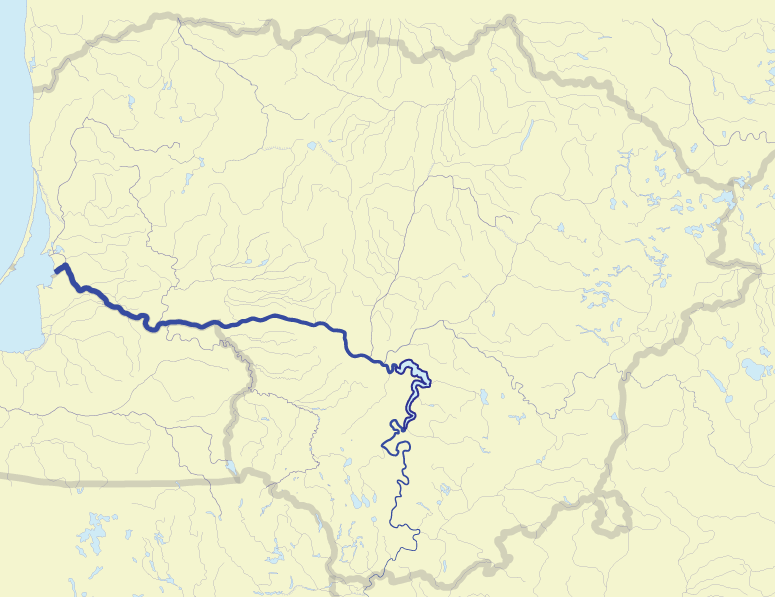
The Neman River drains 65.9% of Lithuania’s territory

== Neman basin ==
The Neman River, which drains into the Baltic Sea, drains 42,970 square kilometres within Lithuania (65.9% of its area). The river rises in Belarus, southeast of Lithuania, and receives waters from the Šešupė River, which rises in Poland.

== Lielupe ==
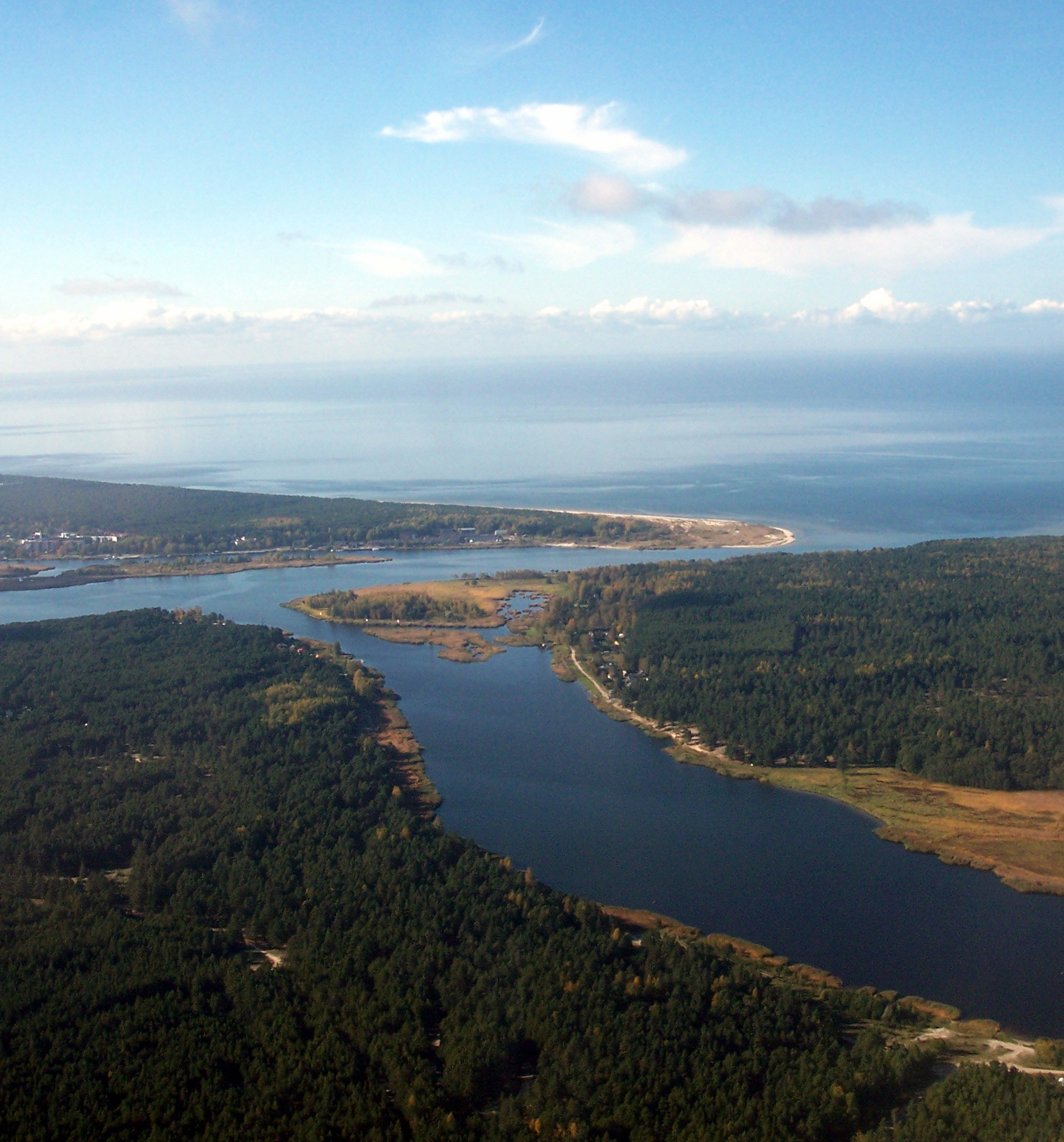
The Lielupe River flows into the Baltic Sea, while the Buļļupe branch flows towards the Daugava River to the west.

The Lielupe River basin encompasses 10,690 square kilometers within Lithuania. The Lielupe flows northward into Latvia and into the Gulf of Riga, a bay of the Baltic Sea. Its tributaries include three rivers that rise in Lithuania (the Svete, Mūša, and Nemunėlis (Mēmele)).

== Venta ==
The Venta River rises in Lithuania, flows northward into Latvia, and discharges into the Baltic. It drains 5,930 square kilometers within Lithuania.

== Pregolya River ==
The Pregolya River (also known as the Pregel) flows in southwestern Lithuania near its border with the Kaliningrad Oblast, later entering the Baltic via the Vistula Lagoon. Its basin includes 70 square kilometers of Lithuanian territory.

== Coastal basin ==
2,870 square kilometers of the country’s area drain directly into the Baltic.
