= Vytautas Mykolas Kalmantas =

Lithuanian-Soviet athlete

Personal information
- Nationality: Lithuanian-Soviet
- Born: 12 February 1932 Kaunas, Lithuania
- Died: 18 July 2008 (aged 76) Vilnius, Lithuania

Sport
- Country: USSR
- Sport: Fencing (foil), shooting
- Coached by: Juozas Ūdras

Vytautas Mykolas Kalmantas (12 February 1932 – 18 July 2008) was a Lithuanian-Soviet foil fencer, handgun shooter, and electrical engineer who is credited for the invention of the semi-automatic core wrapping machine.

== Biography ==
Vytautas Mykolas Kalmantas was born on 12 February 1932 in Kaunas to Mykolas Kalmantas and Vanda Kalmantienė (née Gintilaitė). From 1955 to 1960, he coached the Kaunas Polytechnic Institute athletes team. After graduating in 1960, Kalmantas was senior engineer of electric networks in Vilnius. From 1965 to 1970 he was a radio component factory constructor. From 1970 to 1978 Kalmantas headed a department of the Institute of Urban Construction and Design. From 1978 to 1989 he was one of the institute's senior managers, and from 1989 to 1992 was a designer of the Esta company. Kalmantas died on 18 July 2008 in Vilnius.

== Sports career ==
Kalmantas was the recipient of many prizes for shooting sports and fencing from 1947 to 1970. He was awarded Master of Sport of the USSR for his performance in a fencing championship in 1958 and a shooting championship in 1968. In Lithuania, Kalmantas was a prominent shooter, being champion in 1953, and later holding a 25-meter distance shooting record in 1968 with a small caliber pistol, scoring 592 points out of 600. He also won a shooting championship in 1957. Kalmantas achieved third place in a 1951 USSR javelin junior championship. Kalmantas was foil individual champion in 1956, 1958, and 1960; team champion in 1956, 1957, 1958, and 1971; individual champion of a Spartakiad hosted for countries of the Baltic region in 1957 and 1966, and team champion in 1957. He also achieved seventh place in the 1956 foil Spartakiad, second place in a 1957 USSR championship, and first place in a students' championship in 1960. In 1966 Kalmantas became a fencing judge of "international category". He refereed fencing in the 1980 Summer Olympics, and was the general secretary of the Lithuanian Fencing Federation.

Kalmantas's first coach was Juozas Ūdras. Famous students of Kalmantas include Stasys Šaparnis, Jurijus Moskvičiovas, and Simas Žekonis.
