= Mykolas Kalmantas =

Lithuanian military officer

Colonel Mykolas Kalmantas-Kalmantavičius
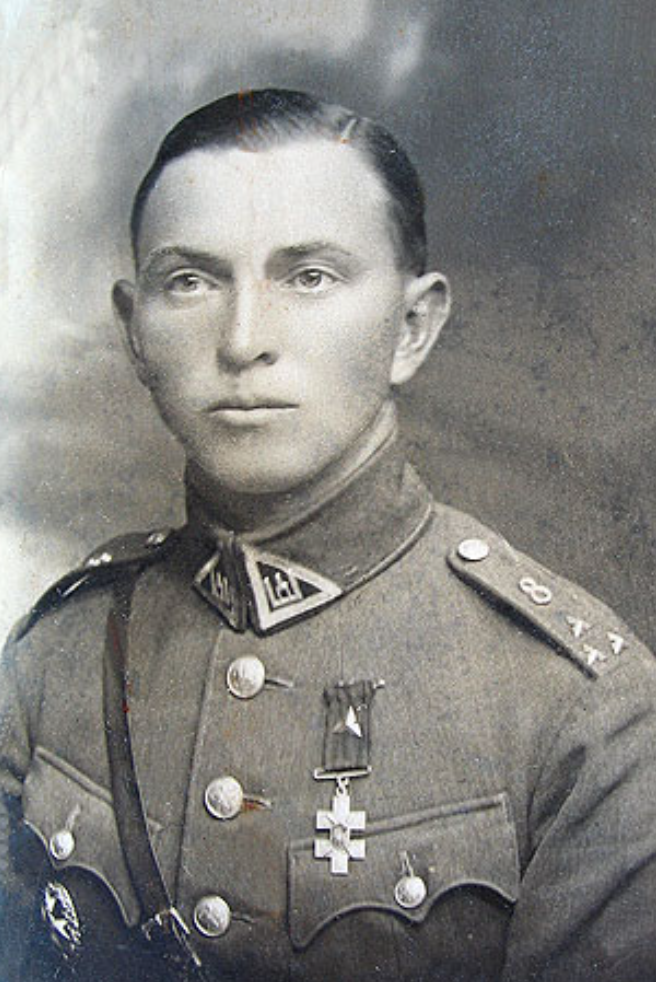

Chairman of the Lithuanian Riflemen's Union
- In office 1925–1935

Personal details
- Born: 18 October 1895 Mėčionys, Vilna Governorate, Russian Empire
- Died: 6 June 1976 (aged 80) Chicago, United States
- Resting place: Lithuanian National Cemetery
- Spouse: Vanda Kalmantienė née Gintilaitė (m. 1930; 1908–1965)
- Children: Vytautas Mykolas Kalmantas (1932–2008), Vanda Danutė Kazlauskienė (1934)
- Education: Higher Officers' Courses, Vytautas Magnus University

Military service
- Allegiance: Russian Empire; Lithuania
- Years of service: 1916–1918 (Russian Imperial Army); 1920–1940 (Lithuanian Army)
- Rank: Colonel

Mykolas Kalmantas (born Mykolas Kalmantavičius; (Note: Kalmantavičius was given the codename Mikas Bajoras during the Klaipėda Revolt of 1923. Kalmantavičius officially changed his surname to Kalmantas in 1927.) 18 October 1895 – 6 June 1976) was a Lithuanian military officer. Apart from being one of the founders of the Aeroclub of Lithuania, Kalmantas had a significant role in commanding a contingent of Lithuanian soldiers during the Klaipėda Revolt of 1923. His son, Vytautas Mykolas Kalmantas, was a famous fencer and athlete.

== Biography ==
=== Early life ===
Mykolas Kalmantas was born on 18 October 1895 in the village of Mėčionys, then belonging to the Vilna Governorate of the Russian Empire, to Matas Kalmantavičius and Anelė Kalmantavičienė née Kuodytė. In 1912 Kalmantas graduated from the St. Petersburg Secondary Technical School.

=== World War I ===
In 1915 Kalmantas attended the St. Petersburg gymnasium, later studying at the Moscow Institute of Archeology. Kalmantas's studies were interrupted by the outbreak of the First World War as he was conscripted into the Imperial Russian Army in 1915. In 1916 he graduated from the Petergof 3rd Praporshchik War School, after which he received the rank of praporshchik, an NCO rank equivalent to sergeant major. Kalmantas served in the 124th and 293rd Reserve Regiments of the Russian Army. In 1917 he was sent to work at a commandant's office in the city of Torzhok, located in the Tver Governorate. For one year Kalmantas served as the commander of the commandant's company at the 128th Division. In 1917 he joined the Lithuanian Reserve Battalion, one of the first 20th-century Lithuanian military units.

After the unit was disbanded, Kalmantas returned to Lithuania and for some time worked for the Vilija company's workshop office in Vilnius.

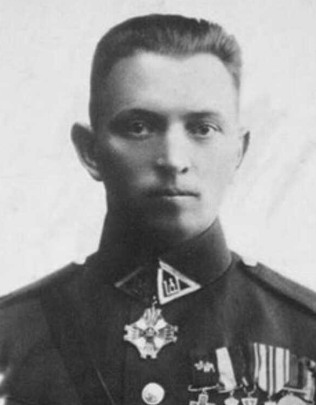
Mykolas Kalmantas in 1919

=== Independence Wars ===
On 3 July 1919 Kalmantas was mobilized into the Lithuanian Army and assigned to the Ukmergė Infantry Battalion's 2nd Company as a junior officer. Later he was appointed the commander of the company's machine-gun squad. In November he was promoted to senior lieutenant. After the battalion was transformed into the 8th Infantry Regiment on 10 December, Kalmantas became the regiment's chief of the regimental communications team just five days later on 15 December. From 1919 to 1920 Kalmantas along with the battalion fought against various Bolshevik forces in the region of Zarasai, and against Polish forces near Augustów and Vilnius. On 20 August 1920 he was made chief of the 6th, and later the Training, Company. As was the customary reward for people serving in the army during the Lithuanian Wars of Independence, Kalmantas received land in the village of Beržai near Jonava.

In May 1922 Kalmantas was promoted to captain. On 13 October 1922 Kalmantas graduated from the Higher Officers' Courses.

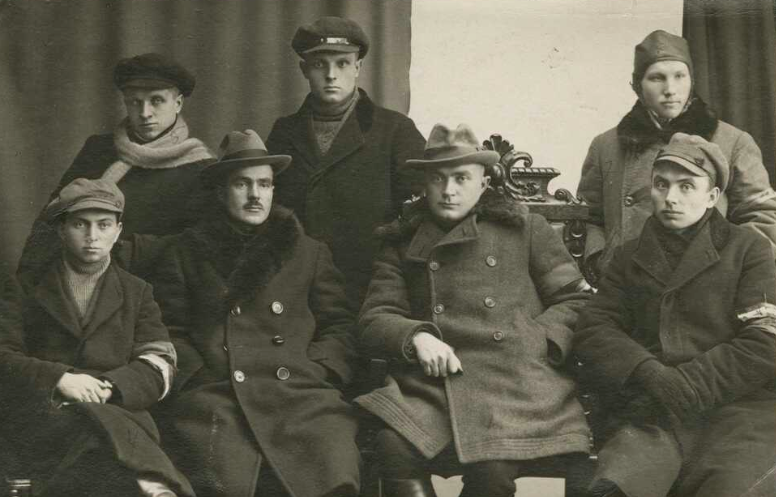
Leadership of the Klaipėda Revolt in 1923. Mykolas Kalmantas is on the left

=== Klaipėda Revolt ===
The Lithuanian government and military intelligence sent Lithuanian activists to Lithuania Minor to propagate unification with Lithuania. The Supreme Committee for the Salvation of Lithuania Minor (SCSLM), chaired by Martynas Jankus, was established to unite all such "local" activist committees. After signing up as a volunteer for the march to Klaipėda, the SCSLM was notified about Kalmantas being made the commander of the second group of rebels under the codename of Mikas Bajoras. From 9 to 22 January 1923, Kalmantas commanded his contingent in taking over the Pagėgiai city and district; Jonas Budrys, one of the most important military intelligence figures in the revolt, reported Kalmantavičius's activity as follows:

"<...> Mikas Kalmatavičius (Bajoras) was appointed the commander of the 2nd group with the task of occupying the Pagėgiai county and establishing himself in the Tilžė district, which he fulfilled at the appointed time."

On 15 January, Kalmantas's contingent broke through the French lines at Klaipėda, occupying the city. Kalmantas personally arrested the senior French governor of the region Gabriel Jean Petisné – it is said that after Petisné demanded Kalmantas show his papers, Kalmantas instead drew his revolver and arrested Petisné. Jonas Budrys described that:

"Later, with two other companies, he was summoned near the city of Klaipėda and after Captain Strielnikas captured the Althof manor, he [Kalmantas] received the task of occupying the bar and taking the city. They pushed the entrenched enemy with a powerful blow and forced them to retreat. The operation was complicated by the fact that the left wing – the second company – stopped as its company commander was killed near the Rumpischen estate and began to retreat in confusion. Nevertheless, at the risk of death every minute, setting an example to his subjects, he went forward and captured a part of the city as far as the river Danga, capturing about 60 well-armed Frenchmen with officers and 10 machine guns."

Kalmantas's contingent also had the task of protecting the border with Germany. Kalmantas was later made the area's commandant. On January 16, Kalmantas was made the commander of the Klaipėda Region's Volunteer Army's 1st Regiment. From 1923 to 1925 Kalmantas was commander of an unknown battalion belonging to the 8th Infantry Regiment. In July 1923, Kalmantas was awarded the Order of the Cross of Vytis, 1st degree, for "bravery and cleverness during the operation of the liberation of Klaipėda".

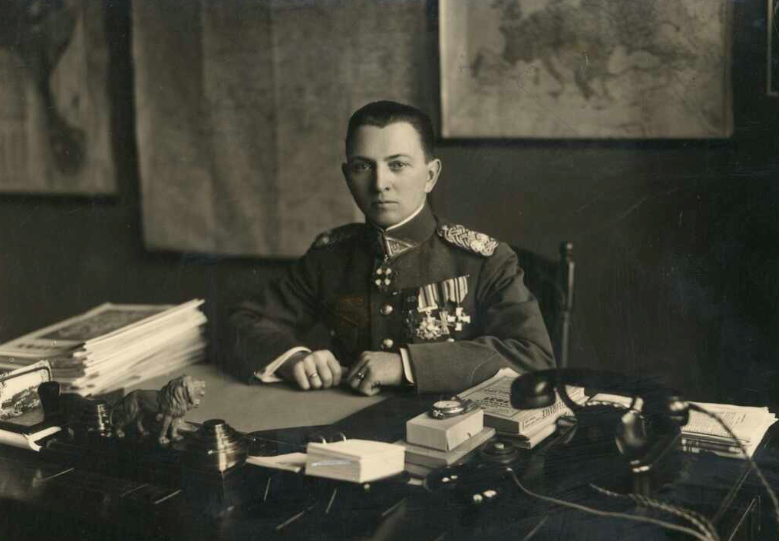
Mykolas Kalmantas, head of the Riflemens Union

=== Military officer career in Lithuania ===
As was common for military officials, Kalmantas studied at the Vytautas Magnus University Facility of Law. In 1924 Kalmantas flew to Denmark to participate in an international scout meeting. In 1927 Kalmantas led a scout delegation that went to Sweden for an international scout festival. From 1925 to 1927 he was a chief scout. In February 1926 Kalmantas was promoted to mayor. In 1927 Kalmantas, along with others, established the Aeroclub of Lithuania. In 1929 Kalmantas was promoted to lieutenant colonel. From 1925 to 1935 Kalmantas was the Commander-in-Chief of the Lithuanian Riflemen's Union, a paramilitary organization. A reform in 1935 made it so the Union was directly subordinate to the Chief of Defence of Lithuania, integrating it closer with the Lithuanian defensive structure. Such reforms caused disagreements between Kalmantas and the military leadership, and so Kalmantas officially resigned in the same year.

After his resignation, Kalmantas was elected a member of the council of elders of the Kaunas Garrison Officers' Club, as well as the President Antanas Smetona's secretary. In 1935 Kalmantas was chairman of the Lithuanian-Finnish Rapprochement Society. On 20 July 1935 he was transferred to the army headquarters and appointed as a special affairs officer under the army commander general Stasys Raštikis. In November 1935 Kalmantas was promoted to colonel. On 3 November 1938 he transferred to the armaments board as chief of the General Department.

=== Soviet occupation and World War II ===
When the Soviet Union occupied Lithuania, Kalmantas was discharged to the infantry officers reserve on 25 June 1940. On 17 December, NKVD officer Aleksandras Gudaitis-Guzevičius gave the order to follow Kalmantas. On 14 May 1941 Kalmantas was arrested and interrogated. The interrogators especially questioned Kalmantas on his work with the Lithuanian-Finnish Rapprochement Society. However, the interrogation did not finish due to the Operation Barbarossa. Furthermore, the June Uprising which occurred on 23 June 1941, freed Kalmantas from prison, after which he joined rebels in Kaunas. On the same day, Kalmantas was appointed as the deputy head of the armaments board of the Kaunas war command, which was just formed by order of the Provisional Government of Lithuania. On 23–24 July, pro-Nazi voldemarininkai, following the wishes of Nazi Germany, unsuccessfully tried to overthrow it.

Kalmantas at this point was made deputy military commandant of Kaunas. After some time Kalmantas was allowed to resign. For some time he served in the Lithuanian Auxiliary Police's communications headquarters. From 1943 to 1944 Kalmantas was head of Kaunas city and county pension department. After the Germans began to retreat from the Soviet Union, Kalmantas decided to flee Lithuania. In summer of 1944 he moved to Germany, however on 29 August he returned and was appointed the head of the press and education department of the headquarters of the Fatherland Defense Force. After the Battle of Seda, having lost contact with his family, Kalmantas moved to the Allied-occupied zones in Western Germany.

=== Emigration and later years ===
In 1948 Kalmantas emigrated to the United States and settled in Chicago, a city with a significant population of Lithuanian émigrés. He was a member of the group that revived the Lithuanian Riflemen's Union in 1954. Although the KGB searched for Kalmantas and his wife even after the war, after receiving information that Kalmantas was already in Chicago, the search was canceled in 1964. Although Soviet authorities claimed that they were in possession of his medals and a parade sword on which his Klaipėda Revolt codename Bajoras was inscribed, all of the items were lost. In his old age, Kalmantas lived in a nursing home, where he was provided with the help of Lithuanian doctors.

Kalmantas died on 28 November 1976. He was buried in the Lithuanian National Cemetery in Chicago.

== Awards ==
Kalmantas received the following awards:

- Order of the Cross of Vytis, 1st degree (1923)
- Silver Medal of the Liberation of Klaipėda (1925)
- Finnish National Guard Iron Cross (1926)
- Lithuanian Independence Medal (1928)
- Order of the Grand Duke Gediminas, 3rd degree (1928)
- Latvian War of Independence 10 Year Anniversary Commemorative Medal (1929)
- Aizsargi Cross of Merit (1929)
- Riflemen's Star (1931)
- Order of the Lily (1931)
- Order of the Wolf of Gediminas (1932)
- Firefighters' "To Help a Close One" Order (1934)
- Estonian Firefighters' Cross, 1st gold order (1935)
- Riflemen's Star (1939)
