= Lithuanian Dragoon Half-Regiment =

Former Lithuanian military formation in the Russian Army (1917–18)

- Lietuvių dragūnų divizionas
- Active: December 9, 1917 – March 3, 1918
- Country: Russian Republic
- Branch: Russian Army (1917)
- Type: Dragoons
- Size: 1 officer, 3 NCOs fulfilling officer duties, 200 soldiers (February 1918)
- Part of: 12th Army

Commanders
- First and only commander: Juozas Mikuckis

The Lithuanian Dragoon Half-Regiment (Lithuanian: Lietuvių dragūnų divizionas) was a Lithuanian unit of the Russian Army that operated in Valka/Valga (now Latvia and Estonia, respectively) from late 1917 to early 1918 and which was also one of the first 20th-century Lithuanian military units, together with the Lithuanian Reserve Battalion. It was two squadrons strong.

== History ==
=== Formation ===
Many Lithuanian served in the cavalry of the Russian Army during World War I. In November 1917, the officer Juozas Mikuckis learnt at the 12th Army's Lithuanian Soldiers' Congress that there are 100 Lithuanians in the 20th Finnish Dragoon Regiment. He offered to organize them into a Lithuanian dragoon squadron. Throughout the unit's existence, its commander was Juozas Mikuckis. Mikuckis was originally an infantry officer and thus commanding a cavalry unit proved challenging, but he was helped by the cavalry wachtmeisters and non-commissioned officers.

At the initiative of Mikuckis and others, the request to form a Lithuanian dragoon squadron was approved by the command of the 12th Army of the Russian Army's Northern Front in late 1917. Organizational work began after the permission and Mikuckis put in a lot of effort, even going so far as utilizing his acquaintances from his days in the Kaunas gymnasium. Mikuckis was also aided by the doctor general V. Gintala, who considered himself a Lithuanian.

=== December 1917 – Spring 1918 ===
On December 9, permission was obtained from the 12th Army's command to form not only a squadron, but a larger unit - a half-regiment (divizion) that was two squadrons strong. Then, the command of the 12th Army sent telegrams to all its units that they were inviting Lithuanians to the half-regiment.

On December 16, Wachtmeister Jonas Eidukaitis arrived in Valka (now Latvia) with 50 dragoons. The squadron was formed in December 1917 from roughly a hundred Lithuanians in the 20th Finnish Dragoon Regiment as well as other units. A total of 120 soldiers and 83 horses were assembled and so, the formation of a second squadron began. A second squadron was quickly formed, and J. Ruškys was appointed as its commander.

The half-regiment's provisions were taken care of by the 12th Cavalry Division. In February 1918, the half-regiment contained more than 200 soldiers with horses.

On 18 February 1918, after the end of the Russo-German armistice and the German Empire's Operation Faustschlag against Soviet Russia, the Lithuanian Dragoon Half-Regiment retreated with the 12th Russian Cavalry Division towards Pskov.

== Capture and aftermath ==
On 3 March 1918, the retreating half-regiment was in the town of Võru (now Estonia) and was captured by the Imperial German Army that same day. The unit could have withdrawn to Russia, but not a single soldier did so, because everyone wanted to return to Lithuania. The Germans disarmed the half-regiment and there was an agreement to transfer it to Lithuania, but the Germans took all the soldiers as prisoners of war to Germany, to a prisoner-of-war camp.

Within 8 months of capture, all were released and returned to Lithuania. Many later became volunteers of the Lithuanian army. At least 5 future volunteers of the Lithuanian Army certainly belonged to this unit: Reserve Captain Juozas Mikuckis, Lieutenant Jonas Eidukaitis, Corporals Aleksandras Šileika and Juozas Garmus, Private Jonas Leckas.

== Sources ==
- Jurevičiūtė, Aušra (2018). "Lietuvių dalinių formavimas Rusijoje ir jų karių savanoriška tarnyba Lietuvos kariuomenėje 1918–1923 m." (PDF). Vytauto Didžiojo Karo Muziejus 2017 metais: Almanachas (in Lithuanian). Kaunas: 223, 231–232.
- Vaičenonis, Jonas (2008). "Lietuvių dragūnų divizionas". vle.lt (in Lithuanian).
