= Pyvesa =

River in Lithuania

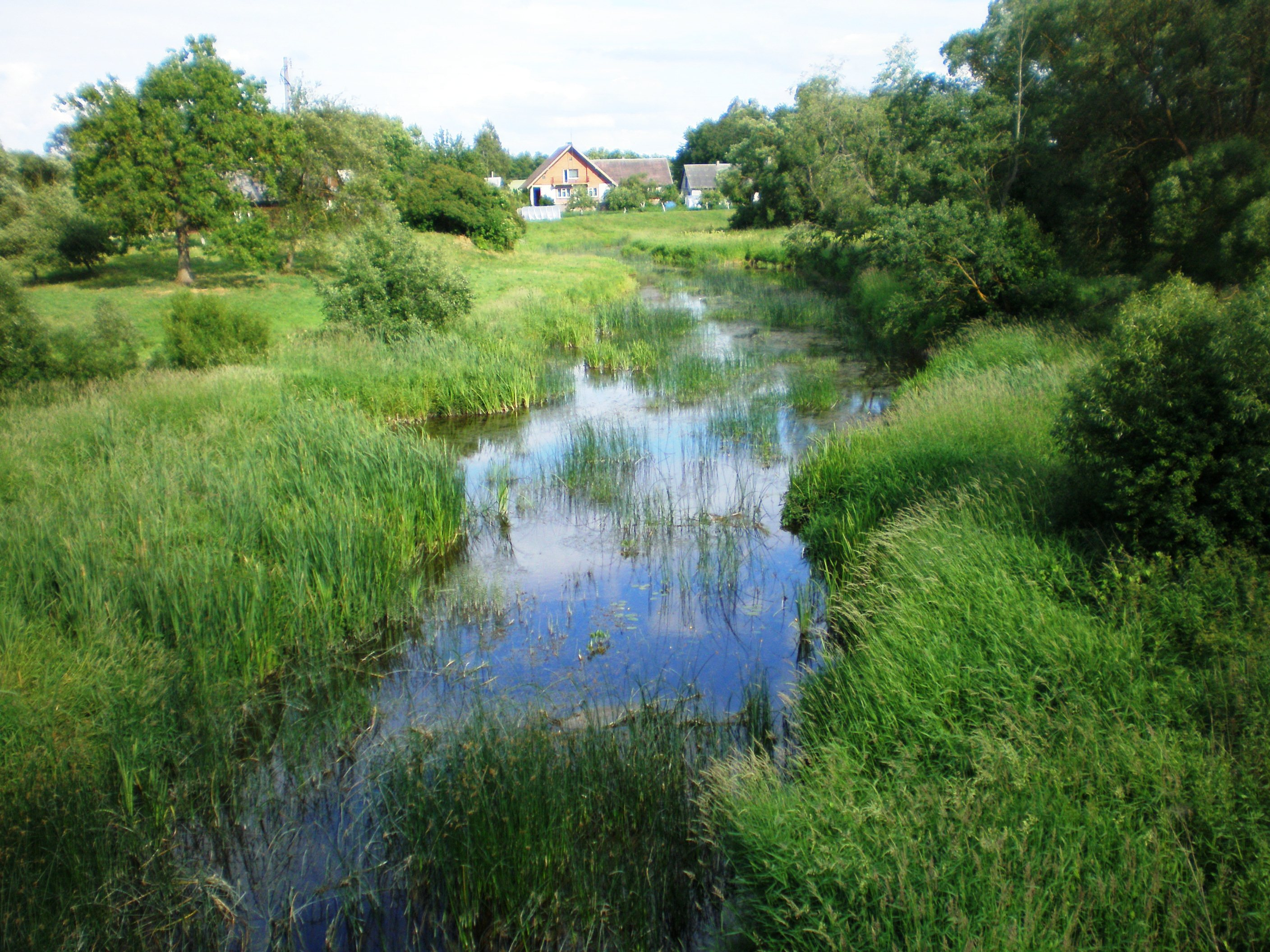

Location
- Countries: Lithuania
- Region: Biržai district municipality, Panevėžys County

Physical characteristics
- Mouth: Mūša
  - coordinates: 56.0983°N 24.4396°E
- Length: 92.6 km (57.5 mi)
- Basin size: 501.6 km^{2} (193.7 sq mi)

Basin features
- Progression: Mūša→ Lielupe→ Baltic Sea

Pyvesa is a river of Biržai district municipality, Panevėžys County, northern Lithuania. It flows for 92.6 kilometres (57.5 mi) and has a basin area of 501.6 km^{2} (193.7 sq mi).

It is a right tributary of the Mūša.
