= Upytė Eldership =

Eldership of Lithuania

The Upytė Eldership (Lithuanian: Upytės seniūnija) is an eldership of Lithuania, located in the Panevėžys District Municipality. In 2021 its population was 1301.
