= Tatula =

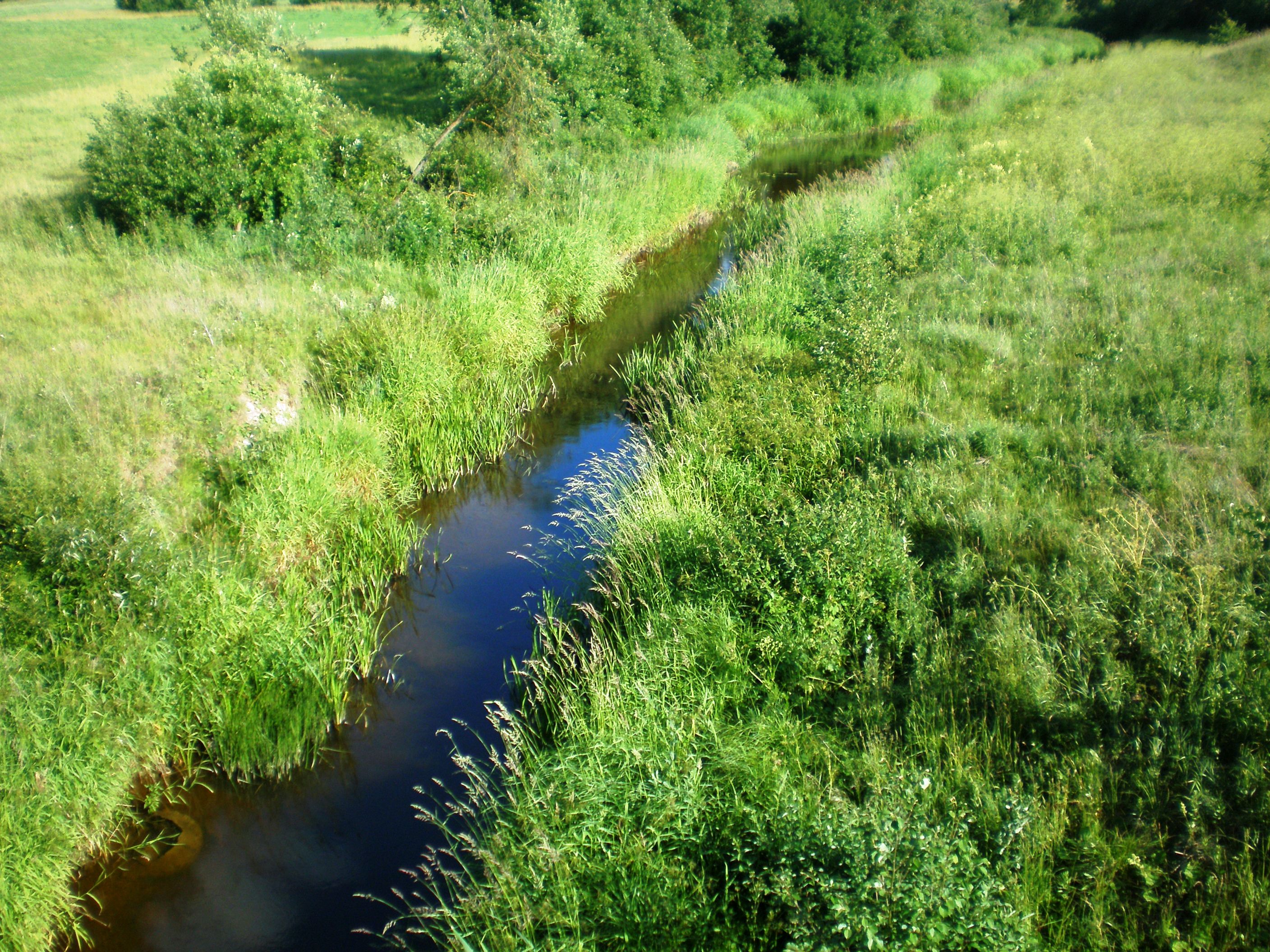

Location
- Country: Lithuania
- Region: Biržai district municipality, Panevėžys County

Physical characteristics
- Mouth: Mūša
  - coordinates: 56.1234°N 24.4540°E
- Length: 64.7 km (40.2 mi)
- Basin size: 453.4 km^{2} (175.1 sq mi)

Basin features
- Progression: Mūša→ Lielupe→ Baltic Sea
- Tributaries
  - left: Upytė
  - right: Vabala, Juodupė

Tatula is a river of Biržai district municipality, Panevėžys County, northern Lithuania. It flows for 64.7 kilometres (40.2 mi) and has a basin area of 453.4 km^{2} (175.1 sq mi).

It is a right tributary of the Mūša.
