= Šešuvis =

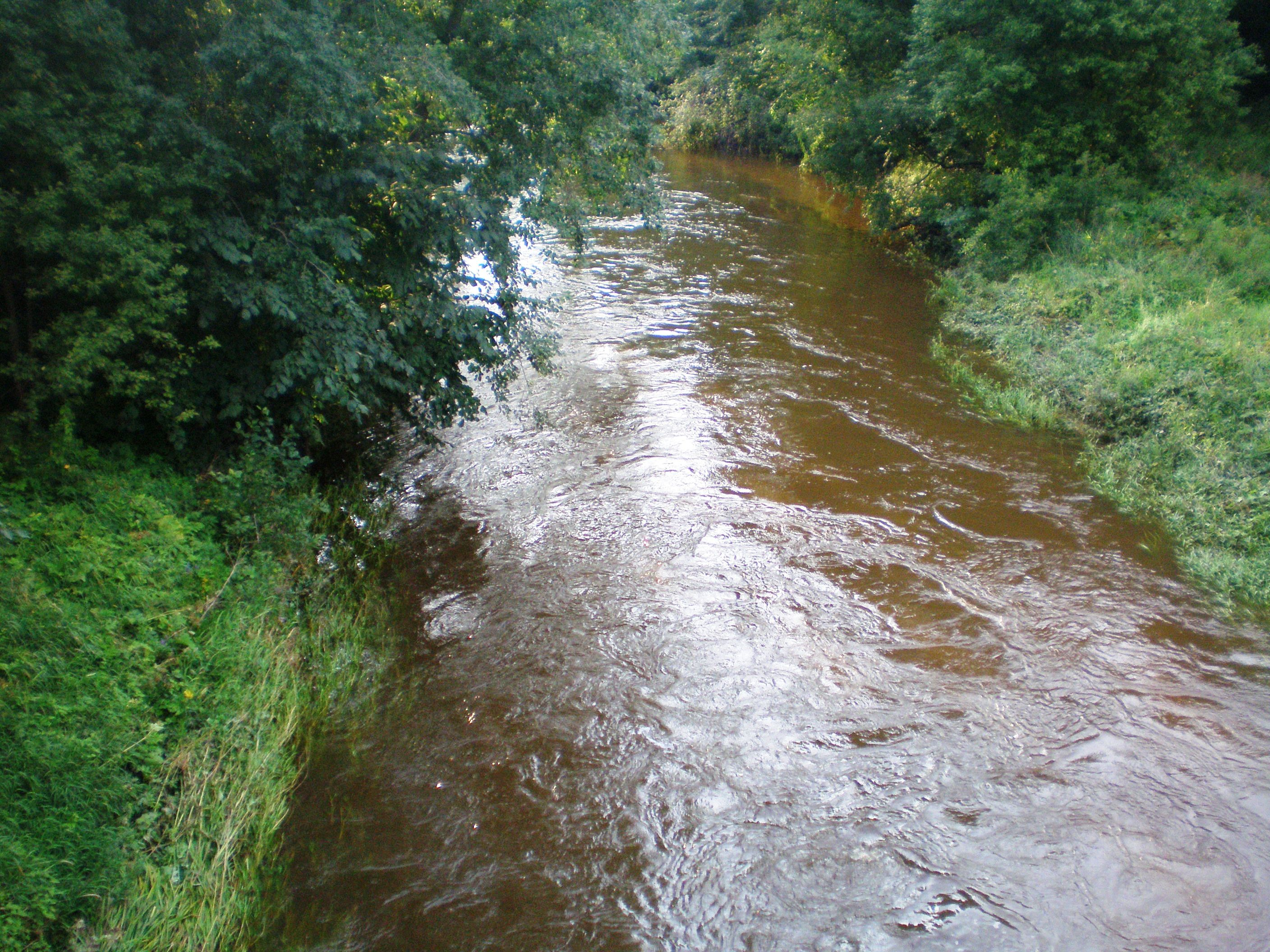

Location
- Country: Lithuania

Physical characteristics
- Source
  - location: Šienlaukis village in Raseiniai district
- Mouth: Jūra
  - location: near Tauragė
  - coordinates: 55°13′05″N 22°15′13″E
- Length: 115 km (71 mi)
- Basin size: 1,916 km^{2} (740 sq mi)
- Discharge
  - average: 16.4 m^{3}/s (580 cu ft/s)

Basin features
- Progression: Jūra→ Neman→ Baltic Sea

The Šešuvis is a river in western Lithuania and the main tributary of the Jūra River. The Šešuvis begins 12 km (7.5 mi) northwest of Raseiniai and flows mostly in a southwesterly direction. Its main tributaries are the Ančia, Šaltuona, Agluona, Žalpė, and Įkojis rivers. There are almost no lakes in Šešuvis' basin; therefore, its water level is subject to great seasonal fluctuations.
