= Jūra =

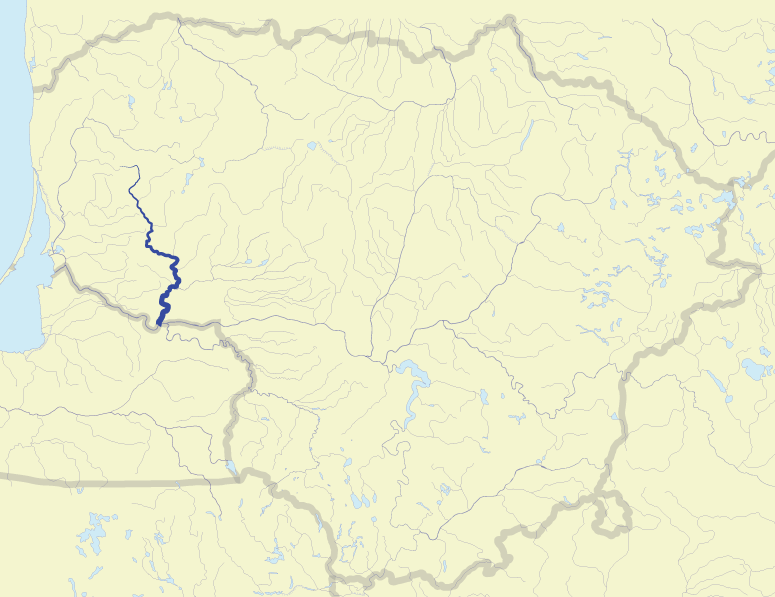
- Map with the Jūra river highlighted

Location
- Country: Lithuania

Physical characteristics
- Source
  - location: Žemaičių Highlands
- Mouth: Neman
  - coordinates: 55.0485°N 22.1343°E
- Length: 177 km (110 mi)
- Basin size: 3,994 km^{2} (1,542 sq mi)
- Discharge
  - average: 41.8 m^{3}/s (1,480 cu ft/s)

Basin features
- Progression: Neman→ Baltic Sea

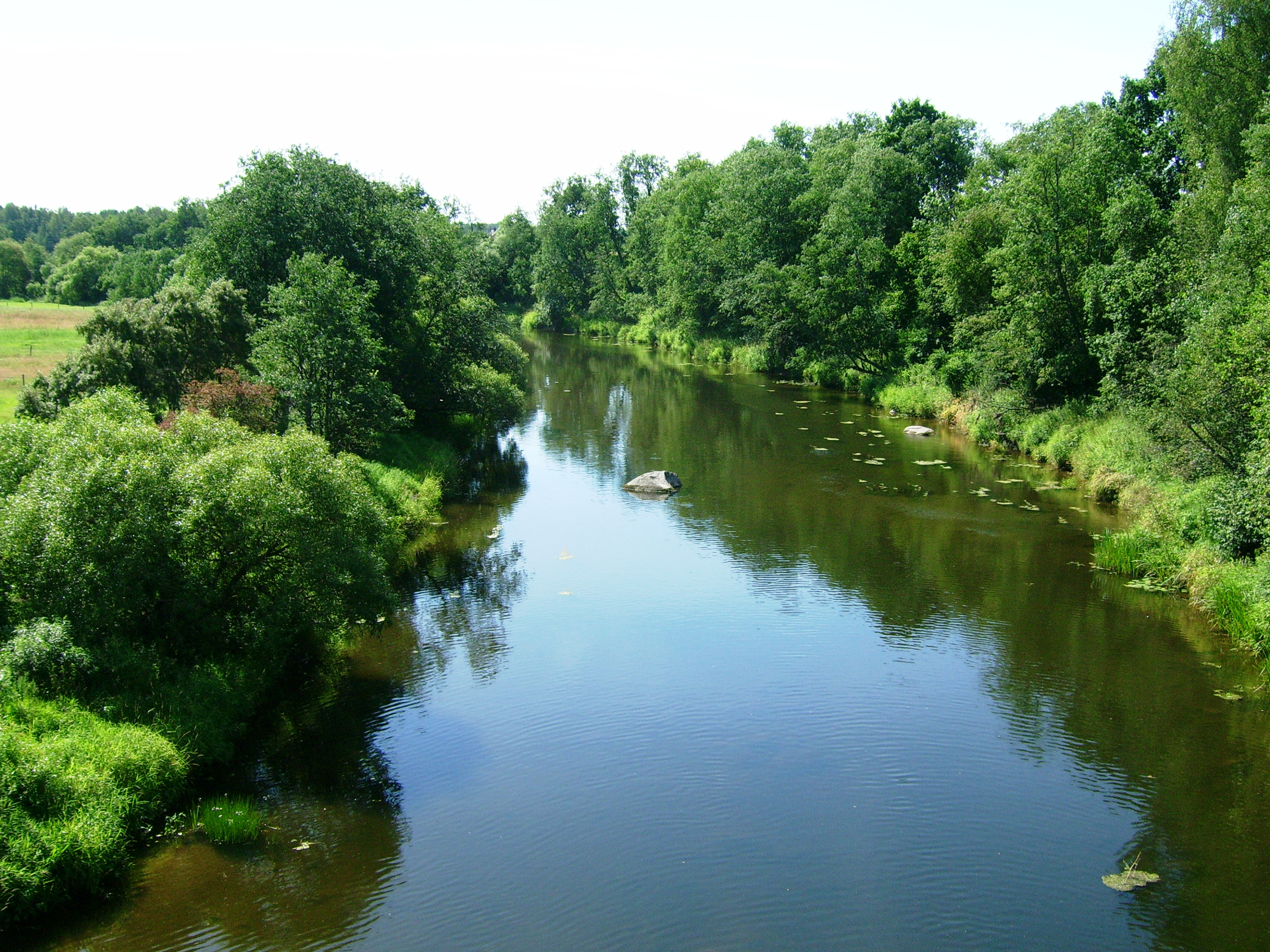
Jūra near Pajūris

The Jūra is a river in Lithuania and a right tributary of the Nemunas (Neman). It mostly follows a meandering and natural course, although two concrete dams of hydroelectric power plants prevent paddling, as do dense vegetation and large stones in its upper reaches. The Jūra is 177 km (110 mi) long.

The river's name comes from the Lithuanian word jūra, which means "sea". Towns on the Jūra include Tauragė, Rietavas, Kvėdarna, and Pajūris.

== Tributary rivers ==
- left - Aitra, Lokysta, Akmena, Šunija, Šešuvis.
- right - Letausas, Šlaunis.
