= Mūša =

River in Lithuania and Latvia

Mūša, Mūsa
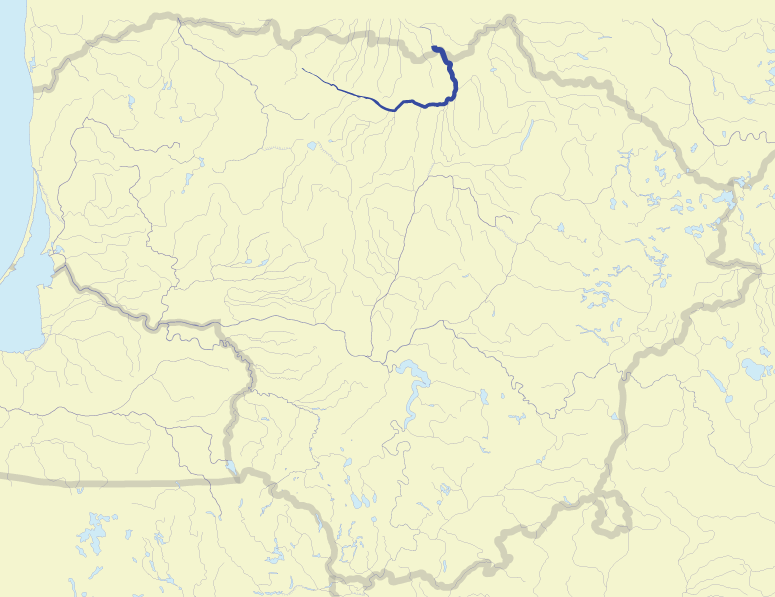
- Map highlighting Mūša

Location
- Country: Lithuania and Latvia

Physical characteristics
- Source
  - location: Joniškis district
- Mouth: Lielupe
  - location: Bauska
  - coordinates: 56°24′10″N 24°9′34″E
- Length: 164 km (102 mi)
- Basin size: 5,318 km^{2} (2,053 sq mi)

Basin features
- Progression: Lielupe→ Baltic Sea
- Tributaries
  - right: Kruoja, Lėvuo, Pyvesa, Tatula

The Mūša (Latvian: Mūsa; German: Muhsse) is a river in Northern Lithuania and Southern Latvia (Zemgale region). At its confluence with the river Nemunėlis (Latvian: Mēmele) in Latvia, near the city of Bauska, the river Lielupė is formed. The river is 164 kilometres (102 mi) long, with 146 kilometres (91 mi) in Lithuania and 18 kilometres (11 mi) in Latvia.

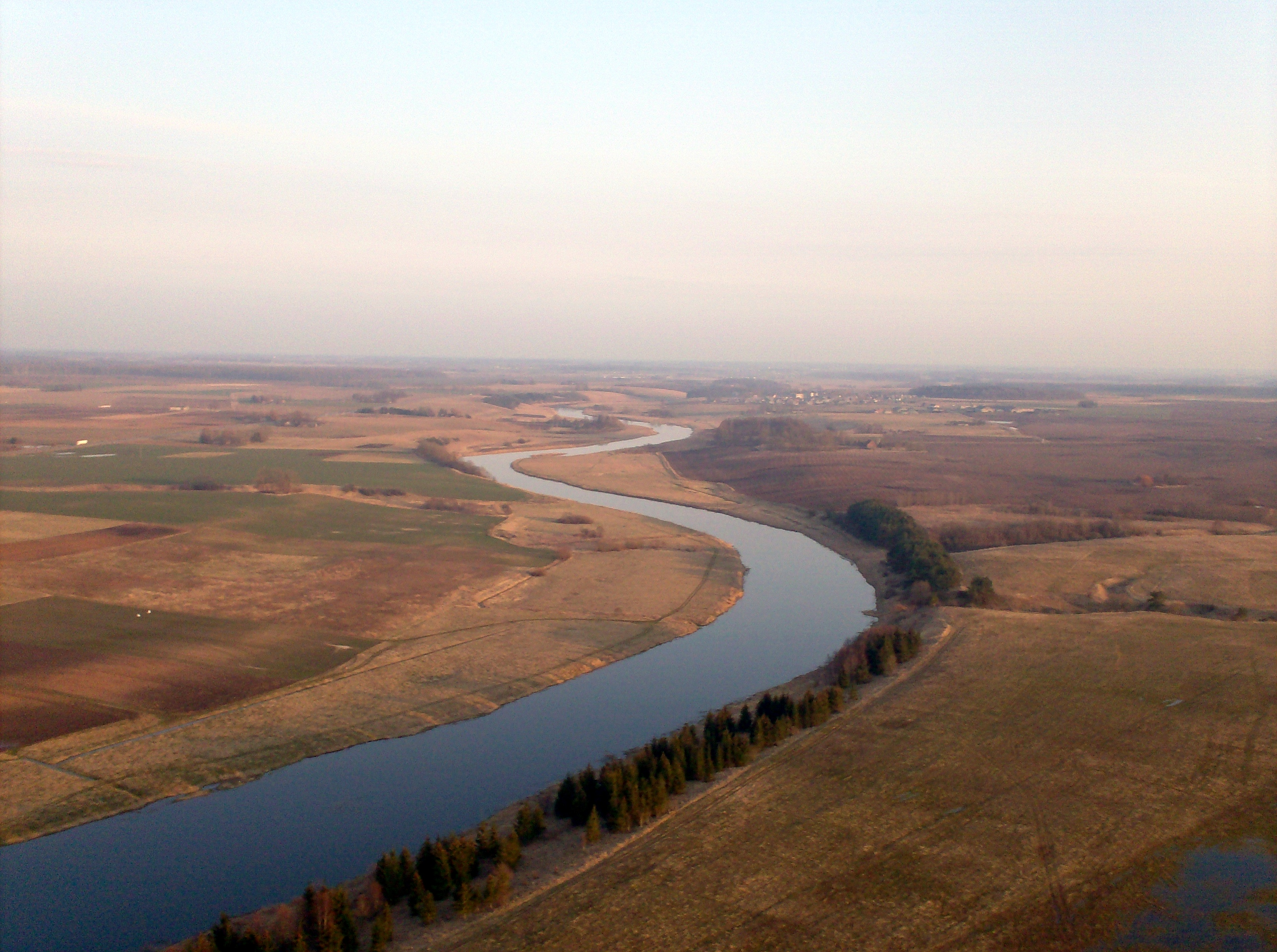
Mūša in Pasvalys district, Lithuania

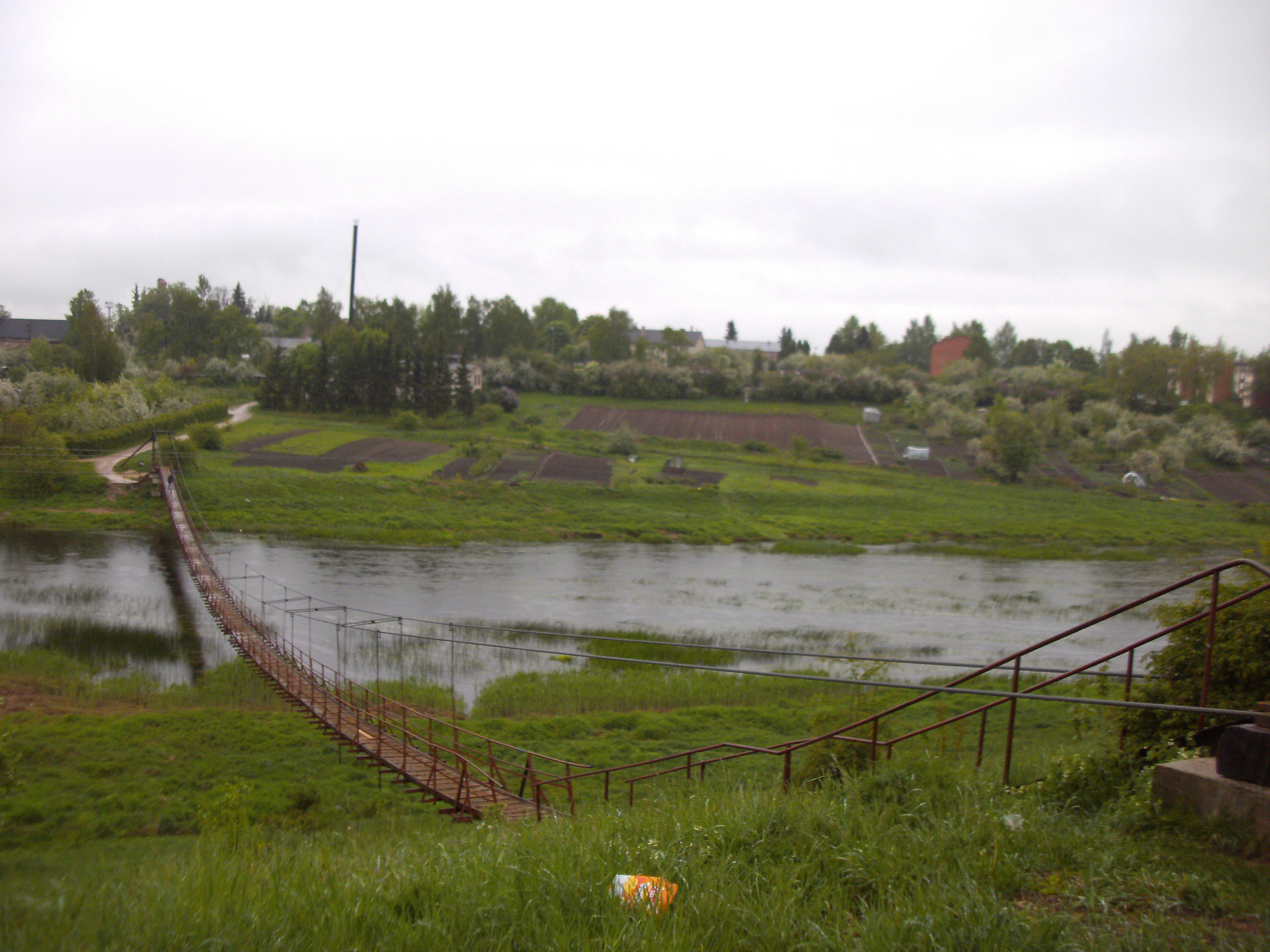
Pedestrian bridge over Mūsa in Bauska
