= Kupiškis =

- Town
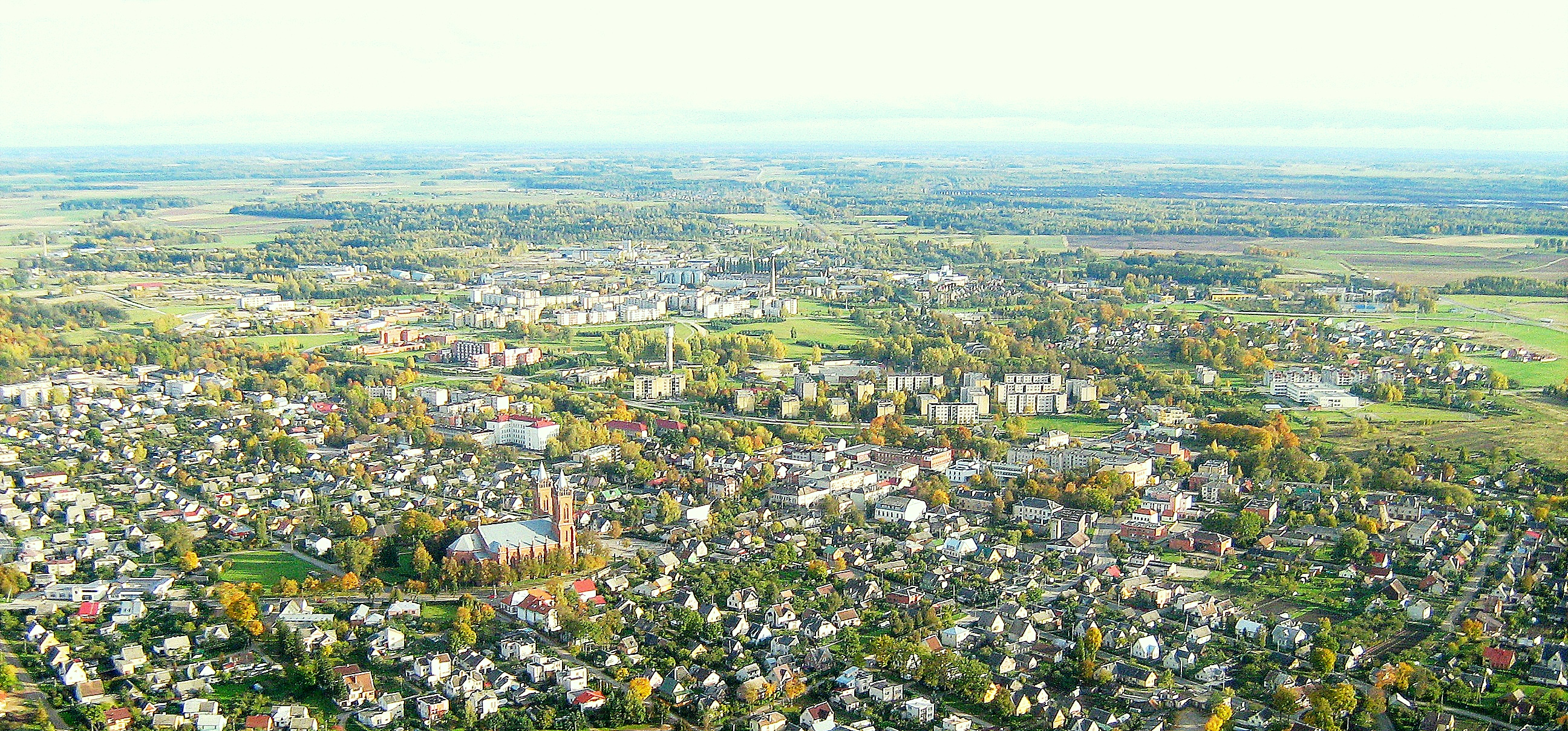
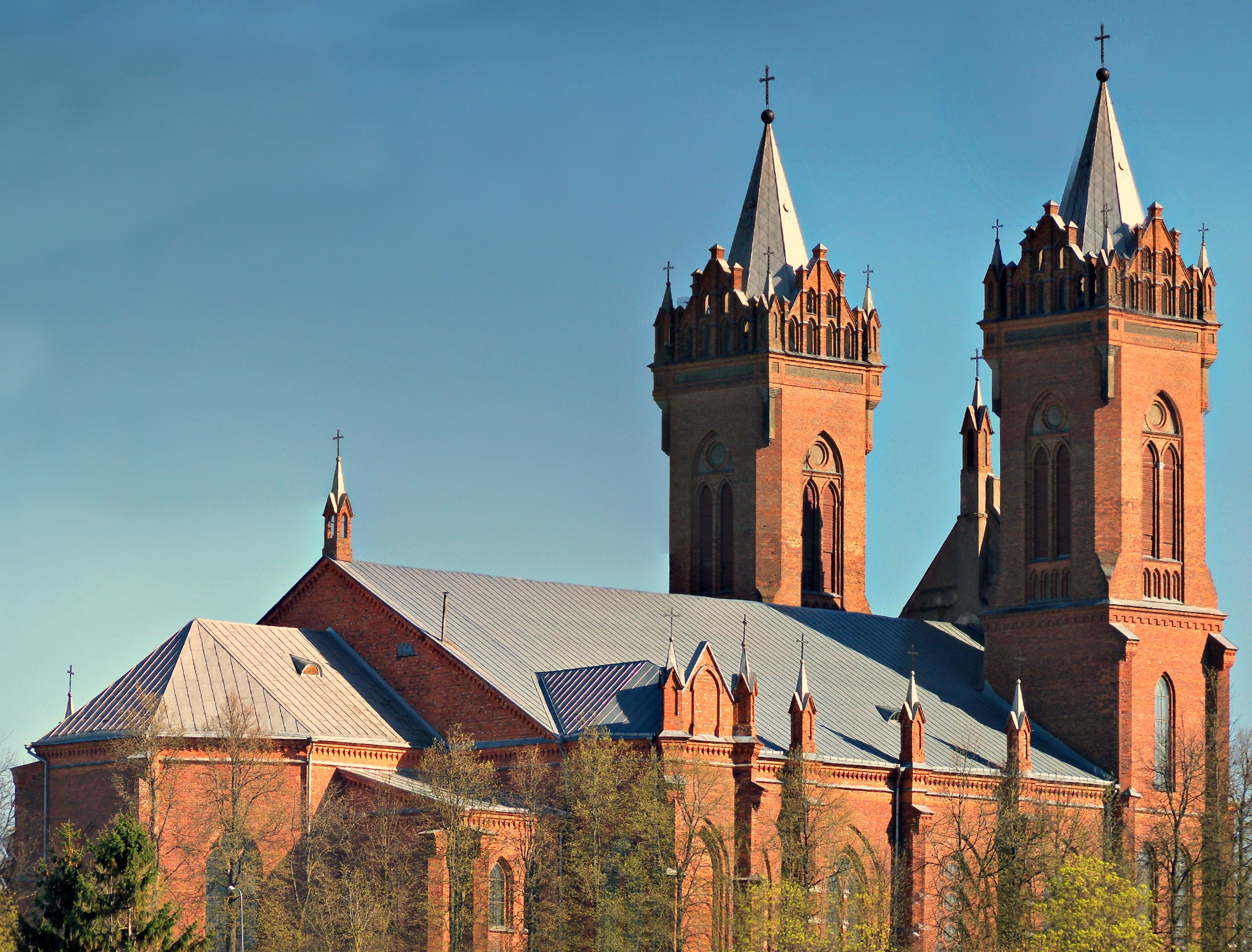
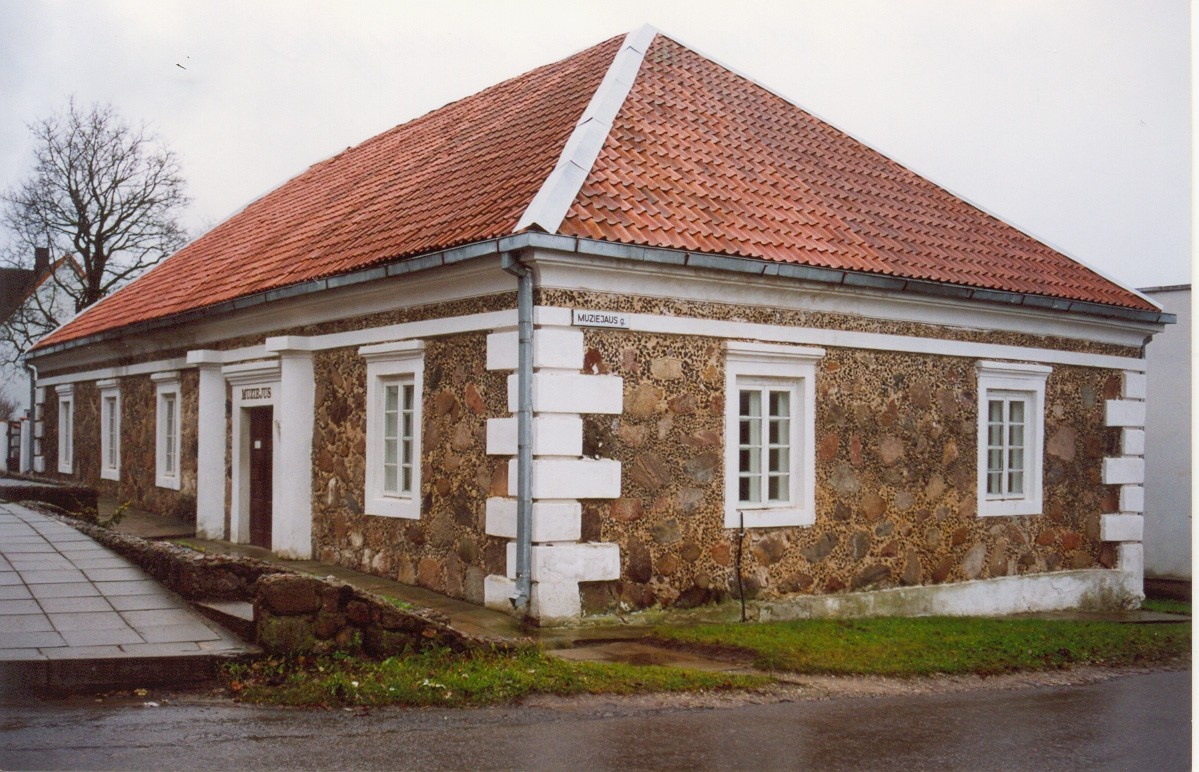
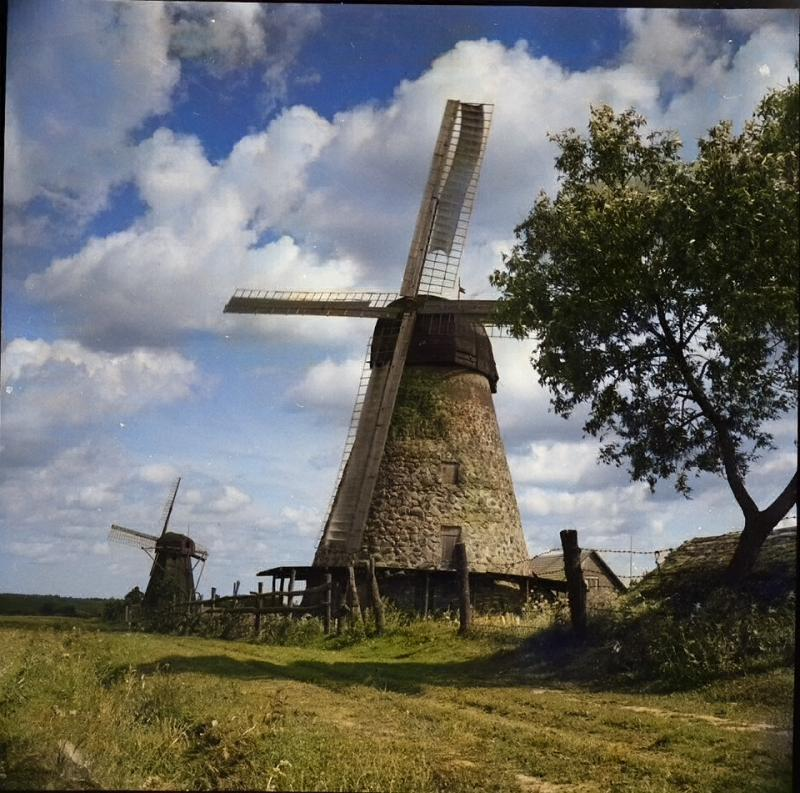
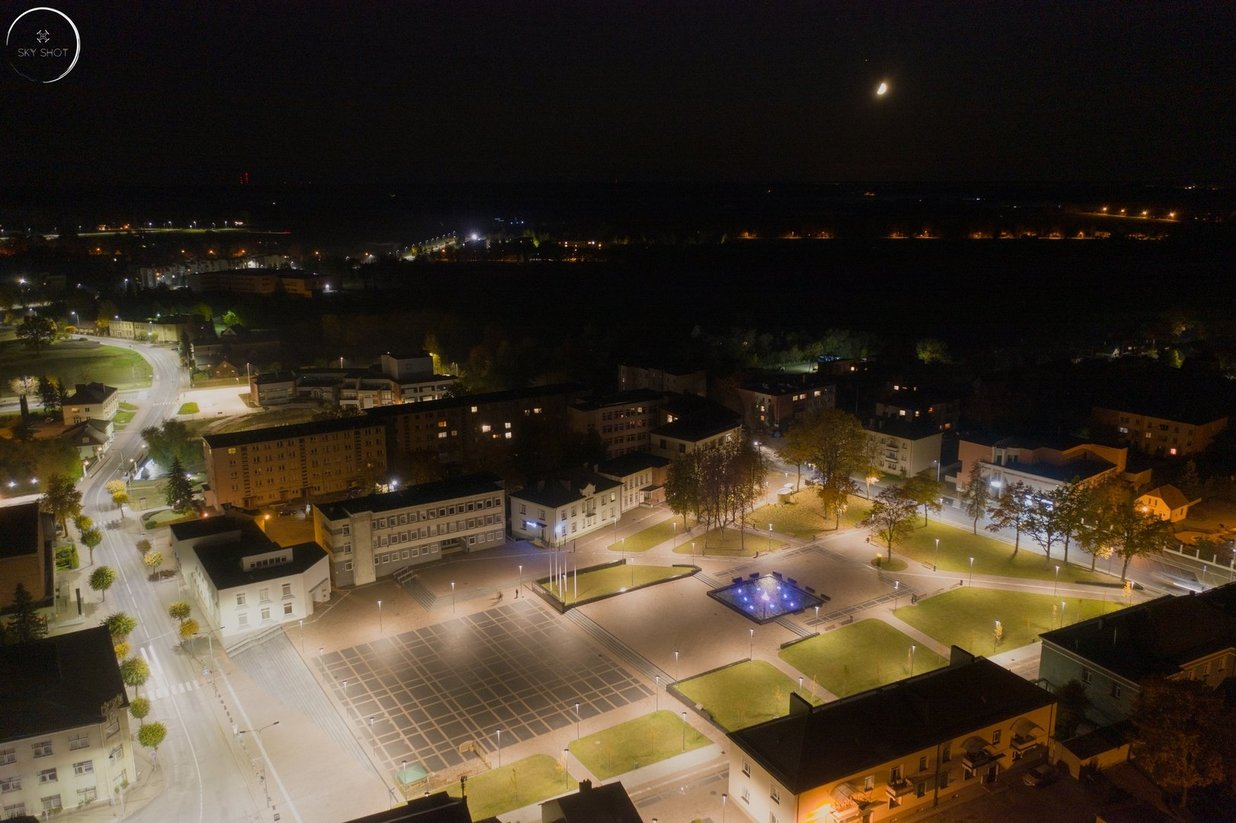
- Clockwise from top: Panorama of the city from north-west side; Church of the Ascension of Christ; Wind mills in Malūnų St.; City square; Museum of Ethnography; Culture Center

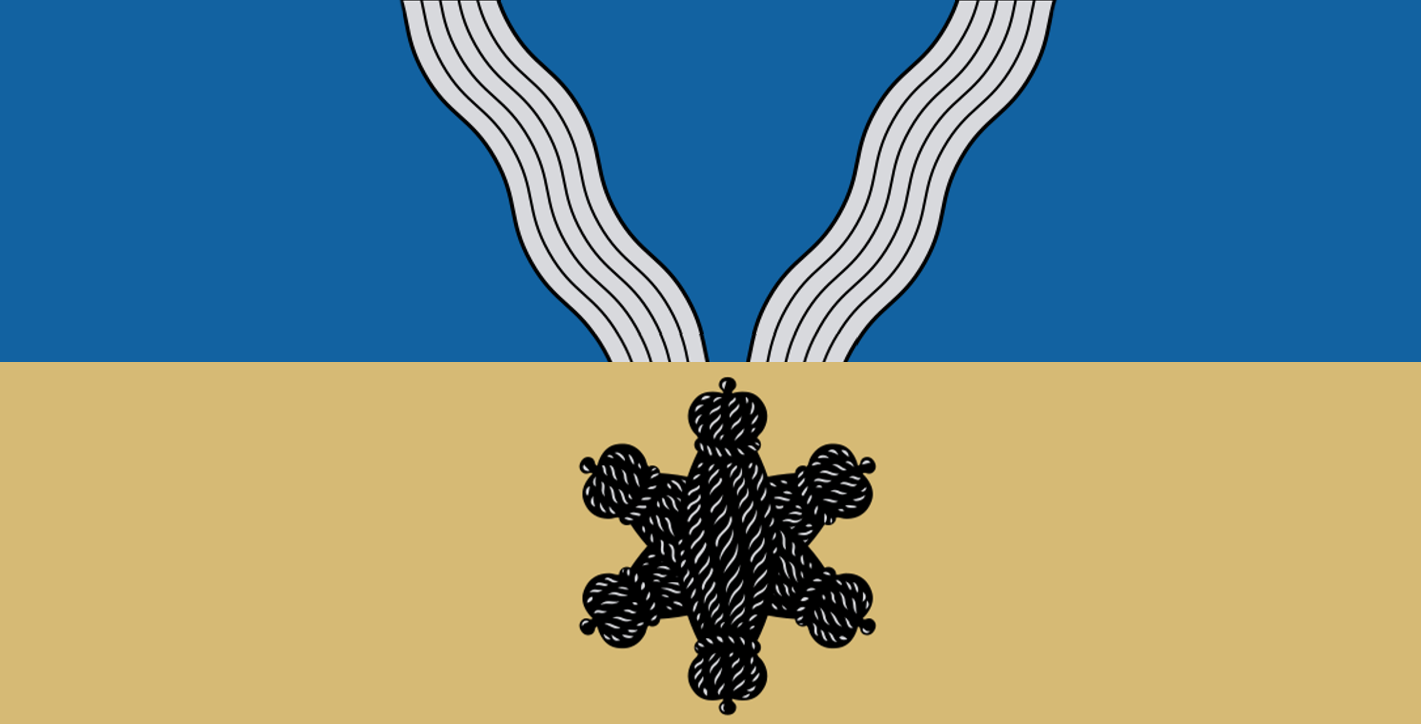
- Flag Coat of arms

- Location of Kupiškis
- Coordinates: 55°50′0″N 24°58′0″E
- Country: Lithuania
- County: Panevėžys County
- Municipality: Kupiškis district municipality
- Eldership: Kupiškis eldership
- Capital of: Kupiškis district municipality Kupiškis eldership
- First mentioned: 1480
- Granted town rights: 1791

Population (2024)
  - Total: 6,105
- Time zone: UTC+2 (EET)
  - Summer (DST): UTC+3 (EEST)

Kupiškis (Yiddish: קופישוק) is a city in northeastern Lithuania. It is the capital of the Kupiškis district municipality, mainly known for its sculptures and fourth biggest water reservoir in Lithuania. Kupiškis is located on the Lėvuo and Kupa rivers. The name of the town comes from the Kupa River. The Gediminas Bridge crosses the Kupa River. There are six parts of the town, which are named:

- Centras (Center or Old Town; the oldest buildings in the town hall, sanitation and utility buildings, library, church, high school, blocks of flats, detached houses)
- Krantinė (high-rise housing complex between 4 and 5 floors, detached houses, shopping malls, preschool, primary school)
- Kraštiečiai (high-rise housing complex between 2 and 6 floors, shopping malls, preschool)
- Račiupėnai (a residential area; detached houses, middle school, business and technological school, bus station)
- Zuntė (a residential area; detached houses)
- Pramoninė teritorija (Industrial district; factories, warehouses, train station)

== History ==
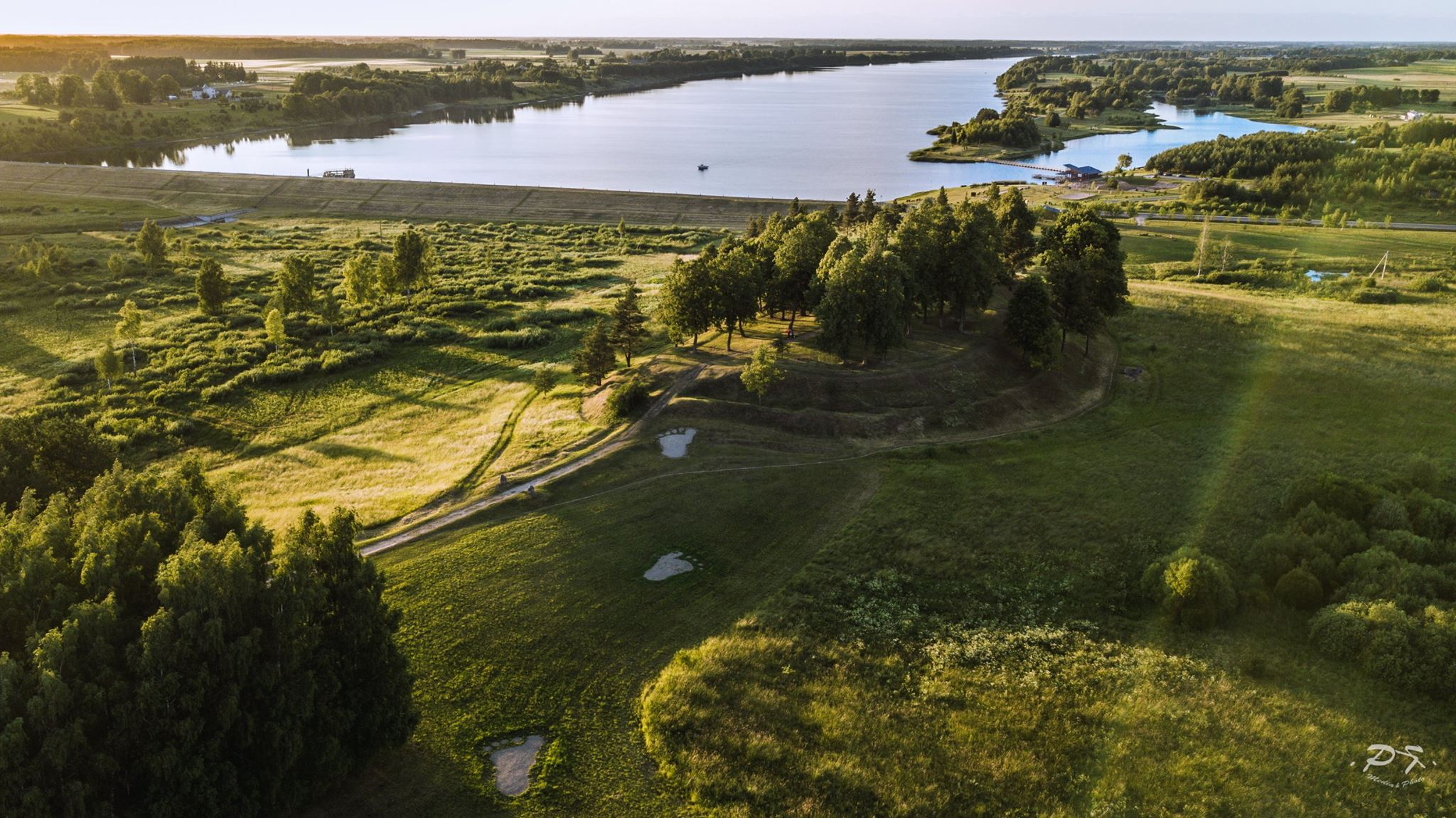
Kupiškis Hillfort

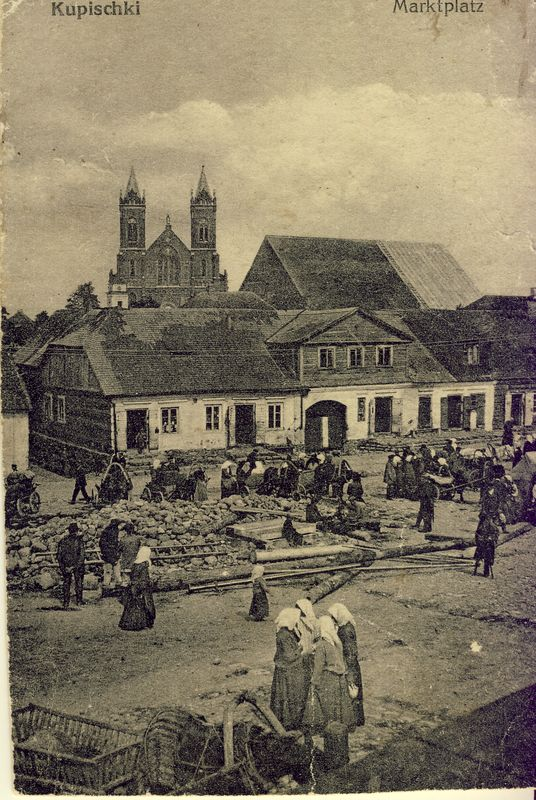
Market Square in 1918

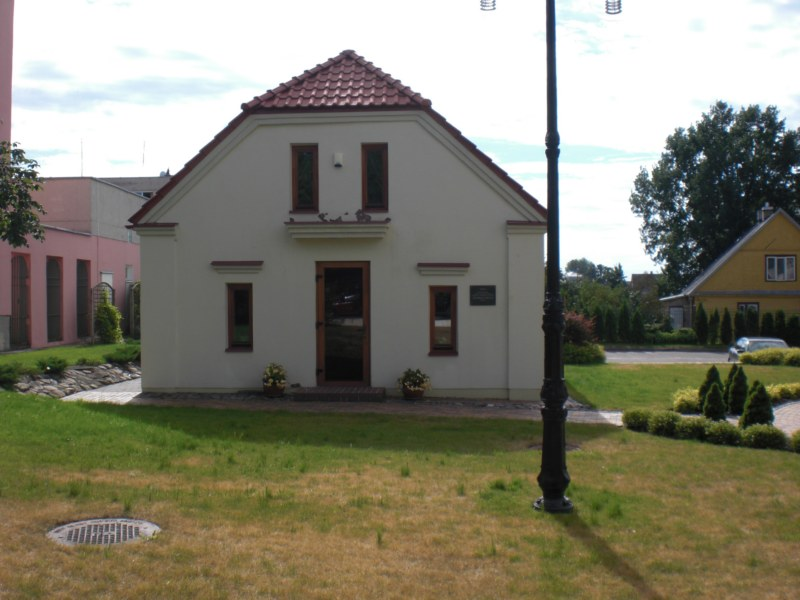
The former Hanseatic Merchants' Flax Warehouse, one of the oldest masonry buildings in Kupiškis

Archeological finds provide evidence that even in the 3rd and 2nd centuries BC people dwelt in the surroundings of Kupiškis. However, there is no information on when the very settlement was founded. The findings around the Aukštupėnai mound show that in the 8th century a wooden defence castle stood there and it functioned as defensive. In the oldest days the area of Kupiškis was inhabited by Selonian tribes. It is believed that the castle on the Kupiškis (Aukštupėnai) Mound was destroyed by the Livonian Brothers of the Sword during the Livonian Crusade in c. 1240.

Kupiškis began to form around the market square and for many years the town structure of 6–9 streets remained unchanged. The earliest known surviving mentioning of Kupiškis in historical sources dates to 1480 when a local of Kupiškis, Stanislaus Johannis de Cupyschky ("de Cupyschky" literally means "from Kupiškis"), has applied as student to the Jagiellonian University in Kraków.

In 1529 historical source the town was mentioned as a property of Grand Duke Sigismund I the Old, the ruler of the Grand Duchy of Lithuania. However, the royal manor of Kupiškis was likely established in the early or middle of the 15th century.

From 1561 to 1565 Kupiškis was a center of small ruler's center, belonging to the Upytė district and later the Ukmergė district. At that time the main road from Vilnius to Riga led via Kupiškis and the local peasants of Kupiškis area were known for success in growing flax. The town was often mentioned in 1561–1565 historical sources because during the Livonian War the Army of the Grand Duchy of Lithuania often marched through the town. In 1616, the first Catholic church was built in Kupiškis. In 1781, the first school of the Lancasterian System was established. In the first half of the 18th century the first masonry building in Kupiškis was built as a flax warehouse and has survived.

In 1844, the town had 1950 residents of who 973 were Catholics. The railway line from Daugavpils to Šiauliai to Liepāja was built in 1873 and stimulated the growth of the town despite suffering from wars and occupations. In the second half of the 19th century the merchants of Riga warehouses were in Kupiškis. A hospital was opened in the town before 1880. In 1888 during the Lithuanian press ban a forbidden Lithuanian language literature press house was established in the town. Moreover, in 1885–1904 a secret school operated which trained Lithuanian in-home teachers. In 1905 Kupiškis already had 3910 residents and in it operated five wind mills and one water mill of which three mills has survived. In 1905 anti–Russian Empire demonstrations took place in Kupiškis. In 1913 electrical lighting was installed in the town.

During the interwar period the population of the town decreased to less than 3000 residents and because of it its towns rights were temporarily suspended, however the establishment of barracks of the Lithuanian Armed Forces has improved the residents situation. In 1935 the Lithuanian Americans has built a cooperative house in the town with small shops, bank and hotel, and it was the town's first building with central heating.

Following the Soviet occupation of Lithuania during World War II the Soviets has deported 37 residents of Kupiškis to Siberia. The Lithuanian partisans of Algimantas district fought against the Soviets in Kupiškis area.

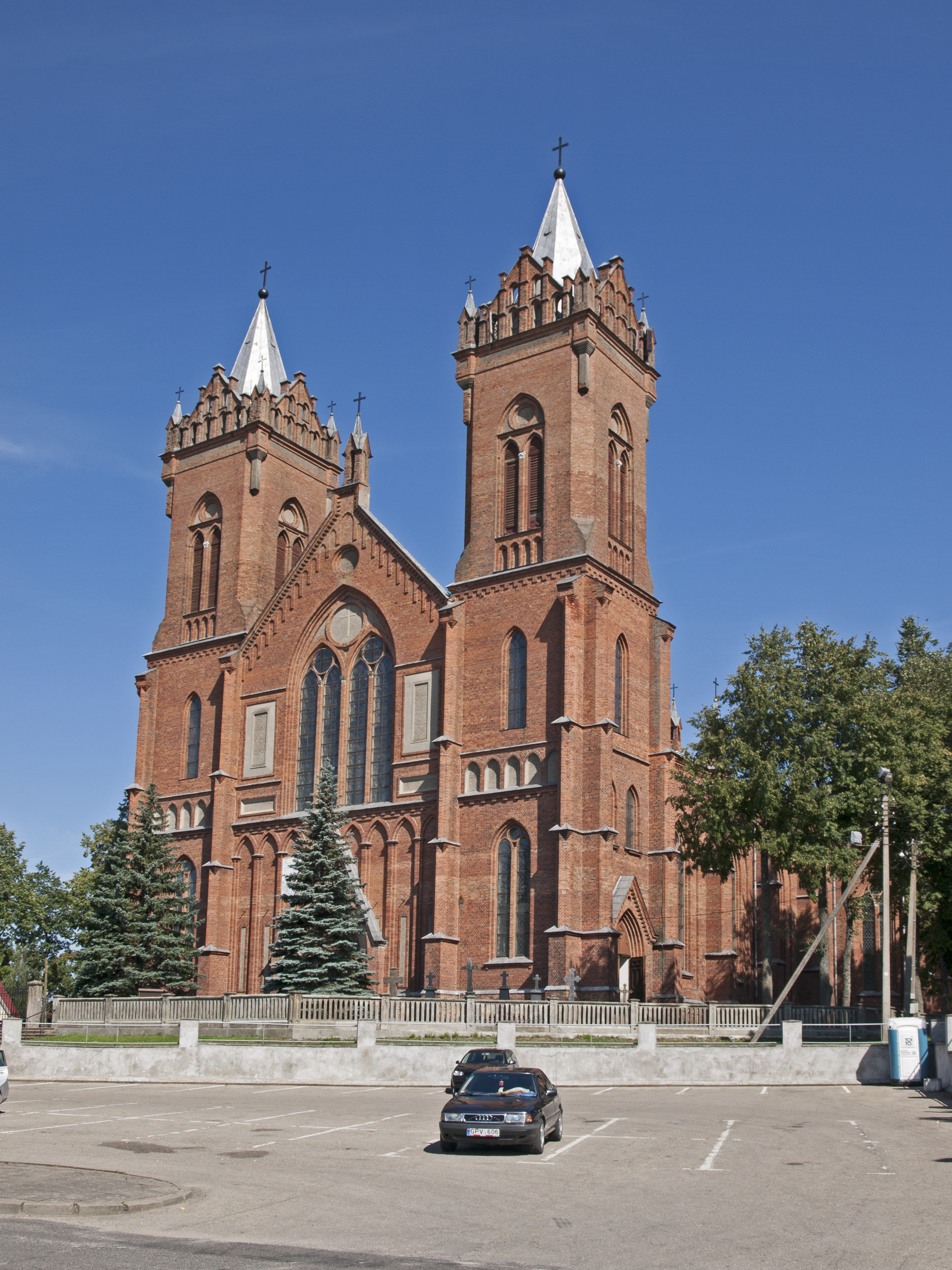
Church of the Ascension of Christ in 2018

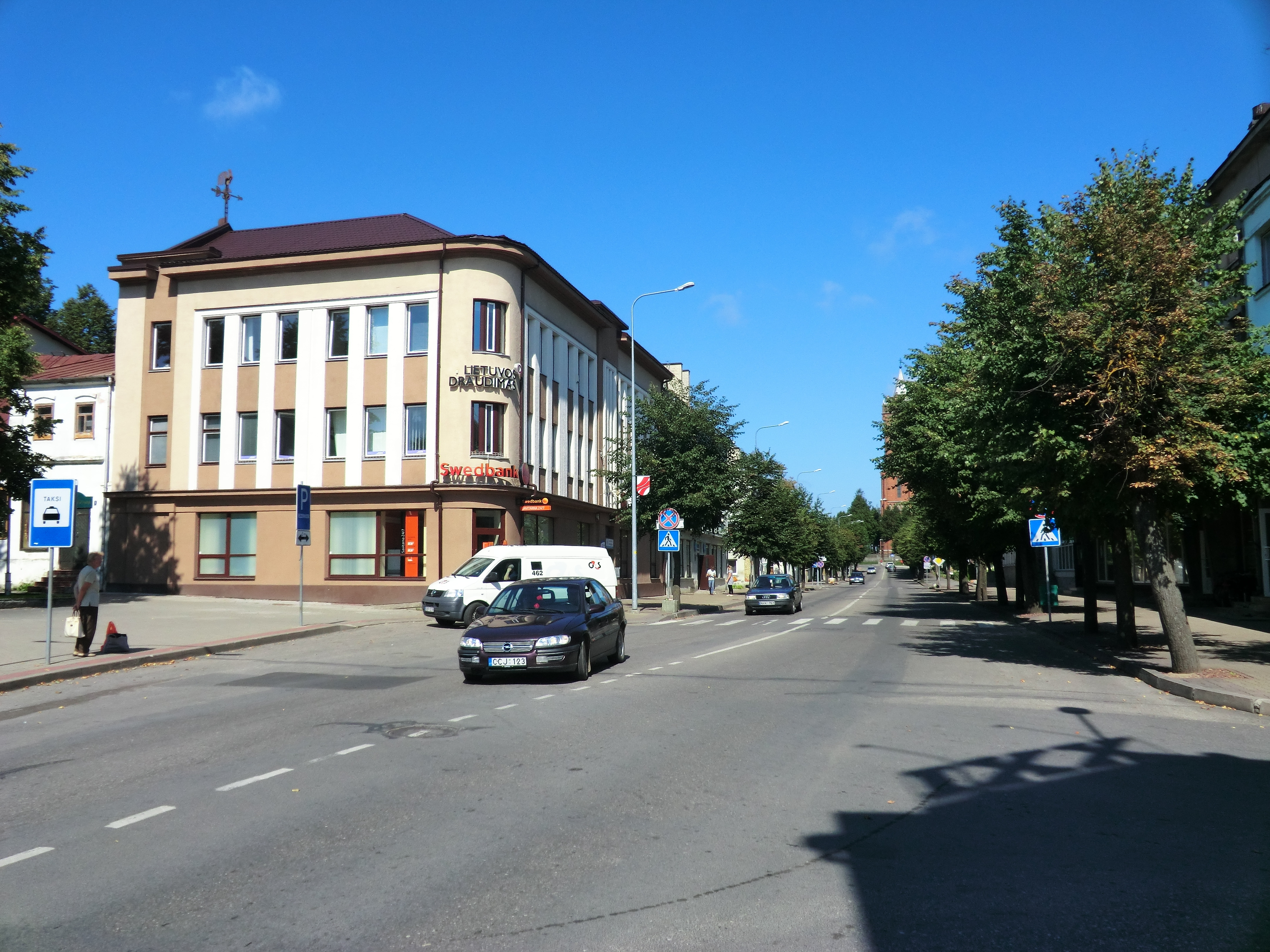
View of one of central streets of Kupiškis in 2012

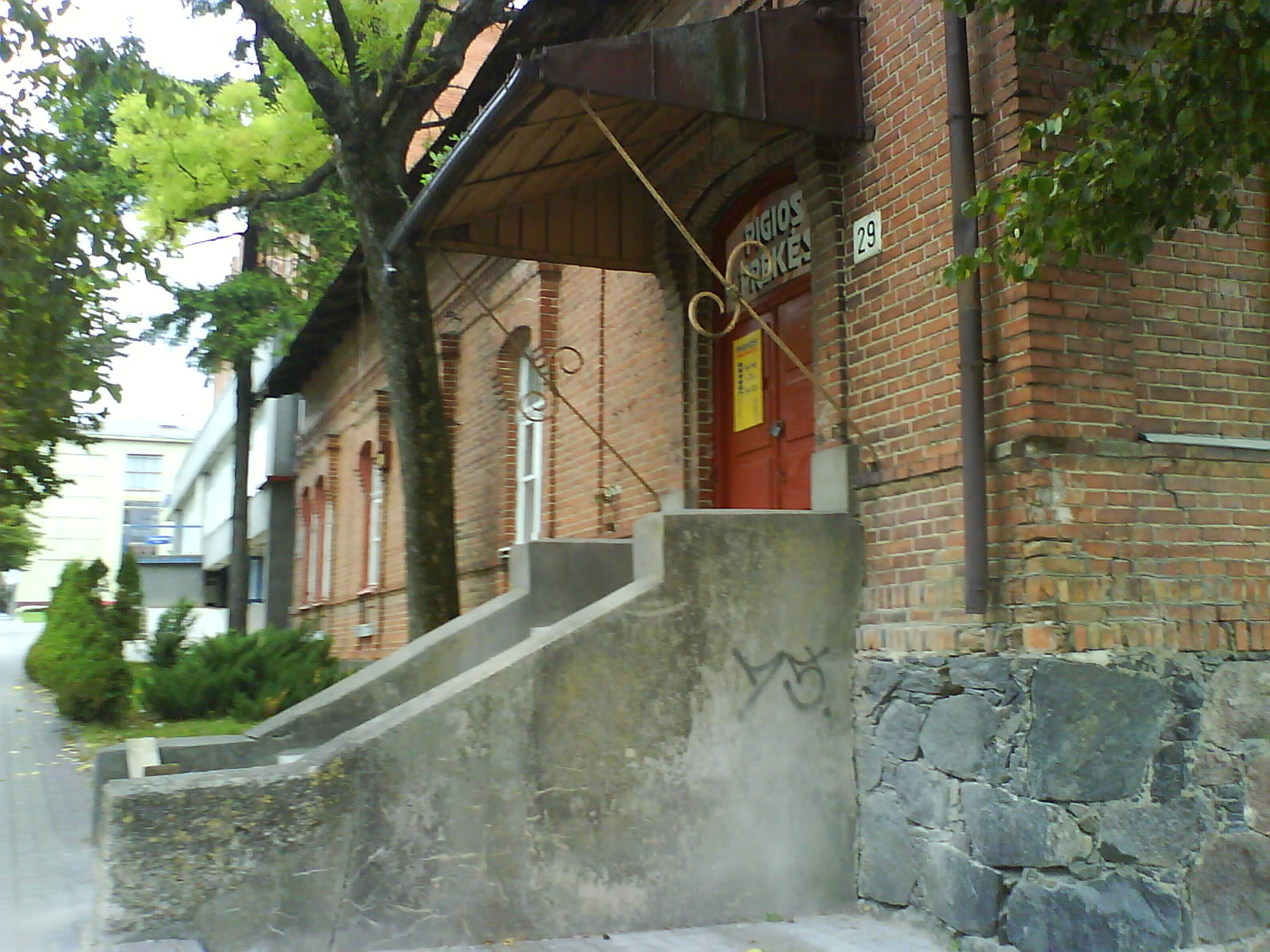
The Old Post

After the restoration of Lithuania's independence in 1990, Kupiškis is the center of the Kupiškis District Municipality since 1995. In 2019 the town's central square named after Laurynas Gucevičius was reconstructed and a musical fountain was installed which elevates the water to up to 8 meters.

== Population ==
According to the State Data Agency, the population of Kupiškis as of January 1, 2024 was 6,105. The ethnic composition of the Kupiškis district municipality, according to the 2001 census, was:

- 23,965 (97.3%) Lithuanians
- 430 (1.7%) Russians
- 64 (0.3%) Poles
- 49 (0.2%) Ukrainians
- 38 (0.2%) Belarusians
- 82 (0.3%) Other nationalities

=== Jews in Kupiškis ===
Kupiškis, known in Yiddish as Kupishok or Kupishik, was home to 1,444 Jews before World War II. The Jewish population basically constituted about 42% of the town's population as of 1939. In the summer of 1941, all of the Jewish men, women, and children in the town were herded into a makeshift ghetto and tormented for about two days, and starved of food and were denied even water, and were then marched in groups to a cemetery reserved for atheists, where they were shot and buried in unmarked pits. In the aftermath of the war, Christian midwives from the Jewish Hospital in Panevezys compiled a list of more than 800 names of the murdered Jews. However, historians estimate that 1,500 to 2,000 Jews were killed by the Nazi and their collaborators "Kupiškis self-defense unit".

A German national named Werner Loew, who had been pretending to be a communist, while teaching the German language at the local gymnasium in Kupiskis, decided to seize control of the town in July 1941 and became the self appointed "commandant" of the town. He had then engaged the services of a small band of deserting soldiers who were part of the Soviet Red Army's 618th artillery unit, who had previously been deployed to Kupiskis in 1940. These Lithuanian former soldiers of the Red Army, were led by Lieutenant Antanas Gudelis, who later became the commander of a unit of executioners under Loew's personal direction.

The Great Synagogue in Kupiškis was built of stone. The red brick portion was a Misnagdim Synagogue. The Great Synagogue was used as the "Culture House" during the Soviet period. The Misnagdim portion is now used as a boiler room for heating the main building which now contains the Public Library and Wall of Memory Holocaust Memorial erected on July 13, 2004. The Memorial dedication service was initiated and attended by Jewish descendants of the residents of Kupiskis. They held a worship service, the first since the destruction of the Jewish community in 1941, in the library which was once the synagogue. Rabbi Michael Mayersohn of Orange County, California, whose paternal grandparents had lived in Kupiskis, led the historic worship service.

Amongst the many Jewish families from Kupiskis who were murdered by the Nazis and their collaborators was the Kacevas family, of which six family members were wiped out in one particular action. A detailed list compiled by the Christian midwives of the known Jewish victims bares testimony to the heinous nature of these and many other murders of the Jewish community, amongst whom were many children. The date for this particular action was 28 June 1941.

The names of the Jewish victims who were murdered in this one particular action which lasted for two days, are contained on this list, and are reflected on the Wall of Memory Holocaust Memorial in the foyer of the former Misnagdim Synagogue, which is now the public library building.

Some non-Jewish residents of the town, such as Dr Franzkevicius, tried to hide and protect some Jewish residents; however, none of those who were protected survived.

== Educational institutions ==
=== Schools ===
Kupiškis Povilas Matulionis Progymnasium

Kupiškis Laurynas Stuoka-Gucevičius Gymnasium

- Kupiškis Laurynas Stuoka-Gucevičius Gymnasium (High School) (for students from 14 to 18)
- Kupiškis Povilas Matulionis Progymnasium (for students from 6 to 14)
- Kupiškis Technological And Business School (for students from 16 to 21)

=== Art schools ===
- Kupiškis Arts School

=== Preschools ===
- Varpelis
- Obelėlė
- Saulutė

== Sport ==
- FC Kupiškis football club;
- Kupiškio centrinis stadionas.

== Twin towns – sister cities ==
Kupiškis is twinned with:

- Balvi, Latvia
- Jēkabpils Municipality, Latvia
- Kežmarok, Slovakia
- (Georgia (country)) Lanchkhuti, Georgia
- Manevychi Raion, Ukraine
- Rēzekne Municipality, Latvia
- Sztum, Poland
- Zgierz, Poland

== Notable people ==
- Laurynas Gucevičius, a Polish-Lithuanian architect, was born in the village of Migonys near Kupiškis.
- Jonas Černius, former prime minister of Lithuania, was born in this town.
