= Gediminas Bridge =

Bridge in Lithuania

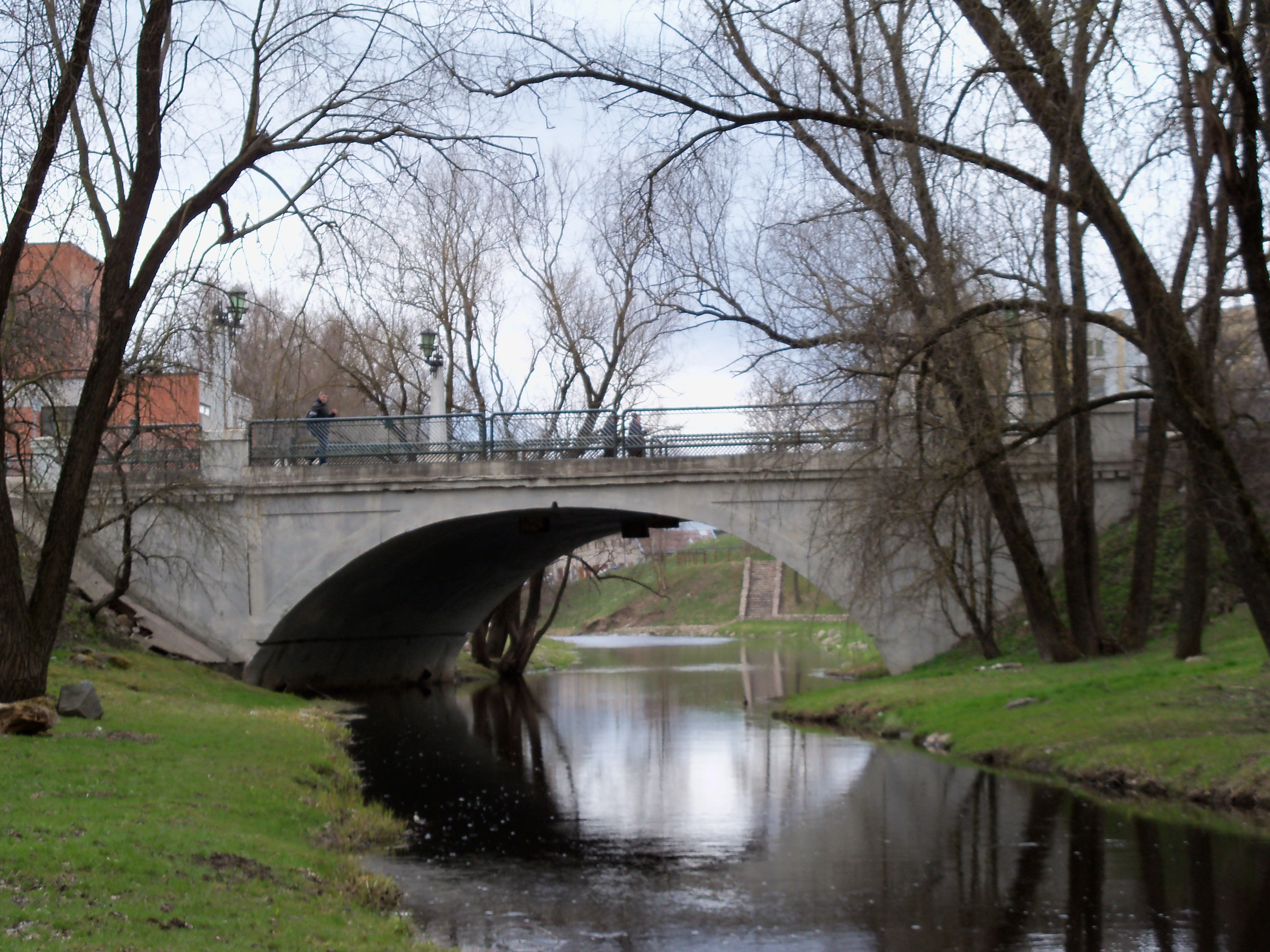
- Coordinates: 55°50′14″N 24°58′37″E
- Crosses: Kupa
- Locale: Kupiškis
- Official name: Gedimino tiltas

Characteristics
- Total length: 24 m
- Width: 14 m
- Height: 8 m

History
- Opened: ~1940

Location
- Interactive map of Gediminas Bridge

Gediminas Bridge (Lithuanian: Gedimino tiltas) is a bridge in Kupiškis, Lithuania. The bridge crosses the Kupa River. It is one of eight bridges in Kupiškis. The bridge is named after the street that crosses the bridge. Gediminas (c. 1275–1341) was Grand Duke of Lithuania from 1315 or 1316 until his death.
