= Svalia =

Svalia may refer to:

- Svalia, Norway, a village in Overhalla municipality in Trøndelag county, Norway
- Svalia (river), a 36-km long river in northern Lithuania and a tributary of the Lėvuo river
