= Pieno žvaigždės =

Dairy company

AB Pieno žvaigždės

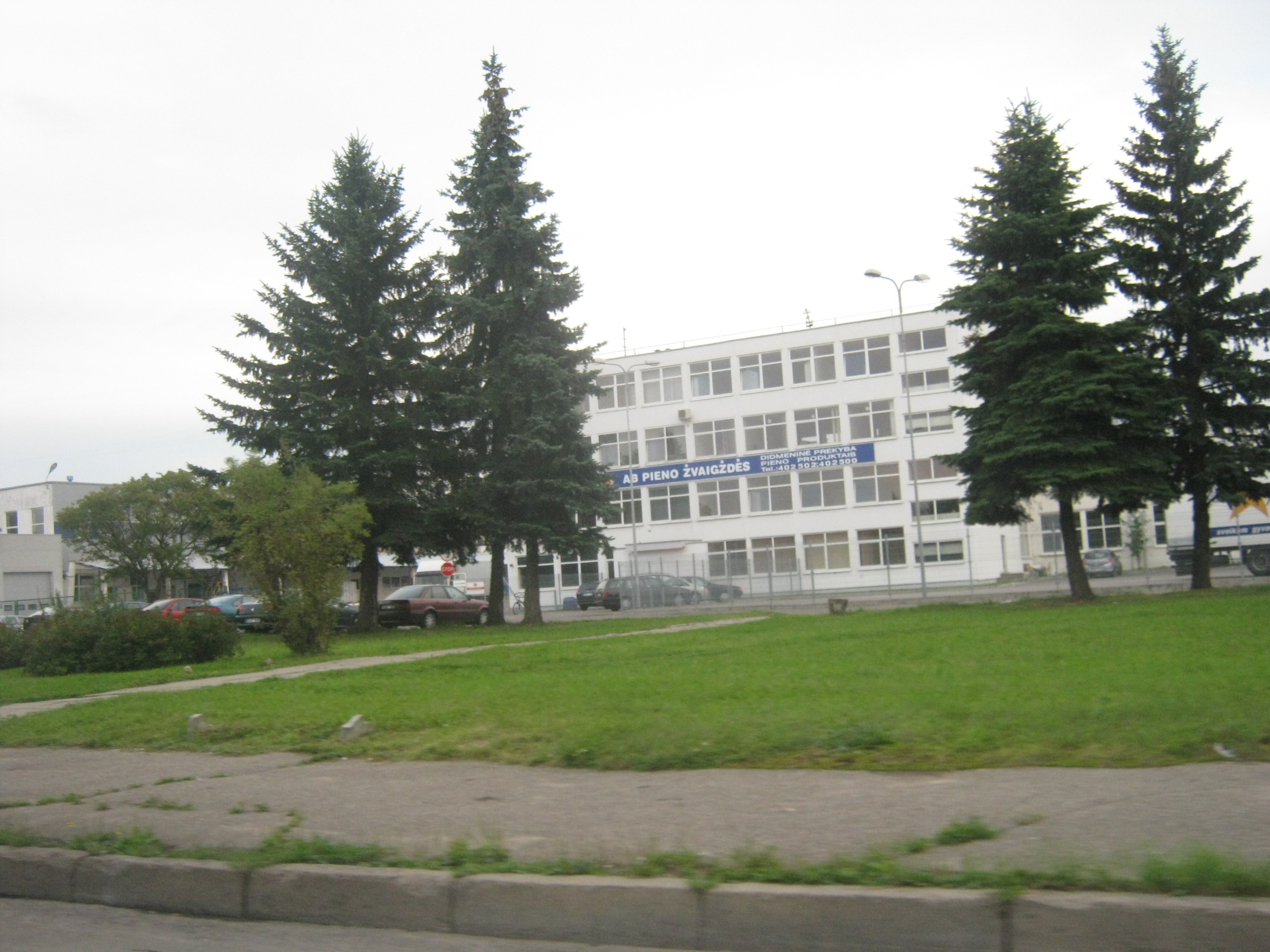
- Pieno žvaigždės in Kaunas, 2011
- Company type: Publicly listed
- Industry: Dairy
- Founded: 23 December 1998
- Founder: Julius Kvaraciejus
- Headquarters: Perkūnkiemio gatvė 3, Vilnius, Lithuania
- Area served: Worldwide
- Key people: Aleksandr Smagin CEO
- Products: Milk, yogurt, kefir, cheese, ice cream
- Revenue: ▲€210.36 million (2024)
- Operating income: ▼€12.60 million (2024)
- Net income: ▼€10.07 million (2024)
- Total assets: ▲€77.63 million (2024)
- Total equity: ▲€40.03 million (2024)
- Number of employees: ▲1,698 (2024)
- Divisions: List: Pasvalio sūrinė; Mažeikių pieninė; Kauno pienas; Panevėžio pienas
- Website: www.pienozvaigzdes.lt

AB Pieno žvaigždės is a Lithuanian multi-country dairy products company, traded publicly in the NASDAQ OMX Vilnius under the ticker symbol PZV1L. It is the fourth-largest dairy company in the country uniting Mažeikiai dairy, Kaunas dairy, Pasvalys creamery and company "Panevėžio pienas".

The company president is Aleksandr Smagin.

== History ==
In 1998, company was founded after the merger of the companies "Mažeikių pieninė" (founded in 1926) and "Pasvalio sūrai" (founded in 1948). In 2000, the company "Kauno pienas" (founded in 1936) joined, in 2004 – Panevėžio pienas" (founded in 1942).

In 2014, due to sanctions on Russia, the company stopped its exports to Kaliningrad.

Since 2015, the company has started exporting its products to Chile.

Sales share by country (in 2024):
1. Lithuania (58.5%)
2. Poland (6.94%)
3. Germany (7.04%)
4. Latvia (4.36%)
5. Uzbekistan (3.17%)
6. Israel (2.78%)
7. United Kingdom (2.75%)
8. United States (2.59%)
9. Azerbaijan (1.43%)
10. Estonia (1.10%)
11. Indonesia (1.32%)
12. Ireland (1.08%)
13. Netherlands (0.97%)
14. Kazakhstan (0.70%)
15. Other (5.24%)

== See also ==
- Žemaitijos pienas
- Rokiškio sūris
