= Pasvalys =

- City
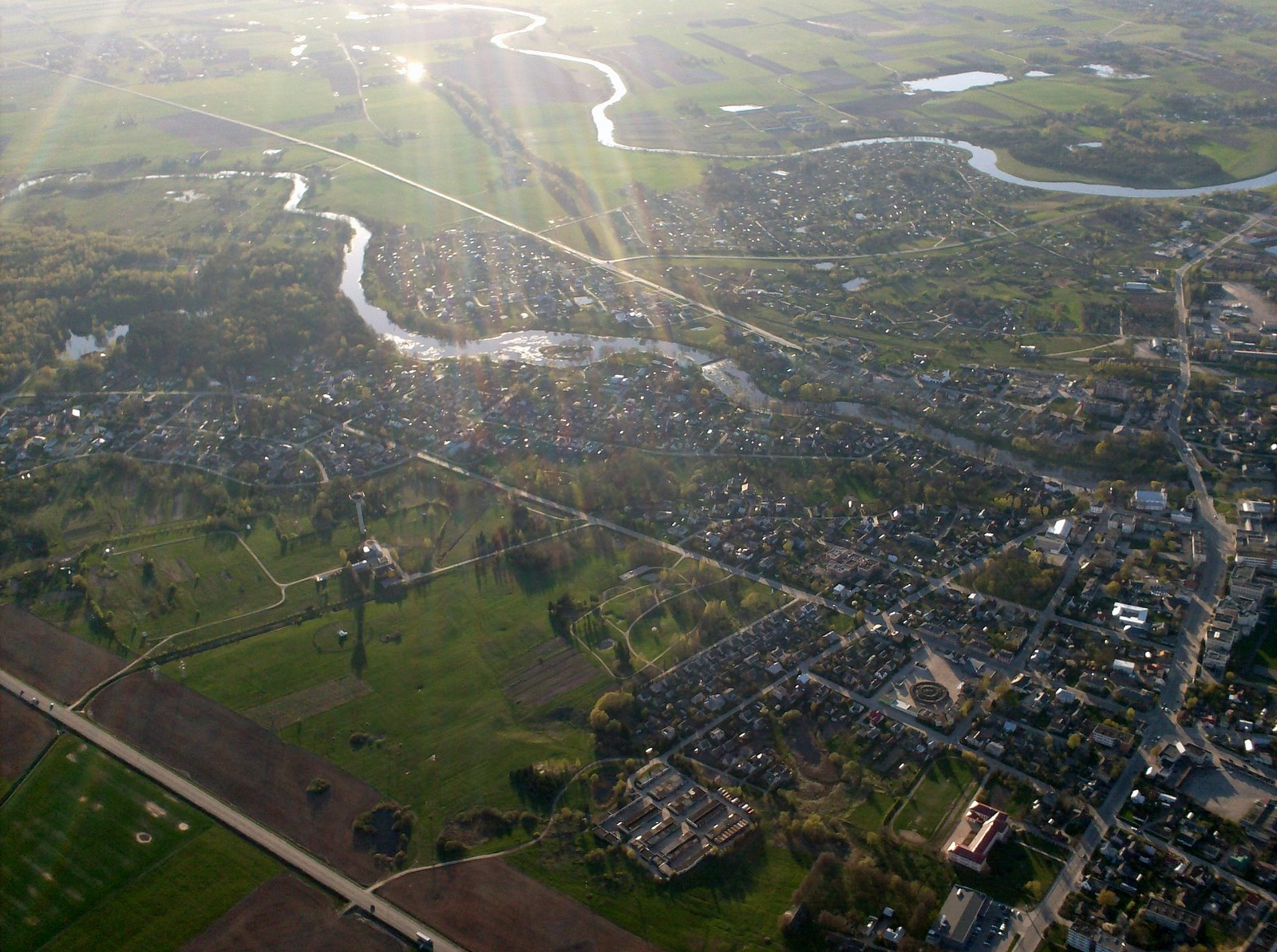

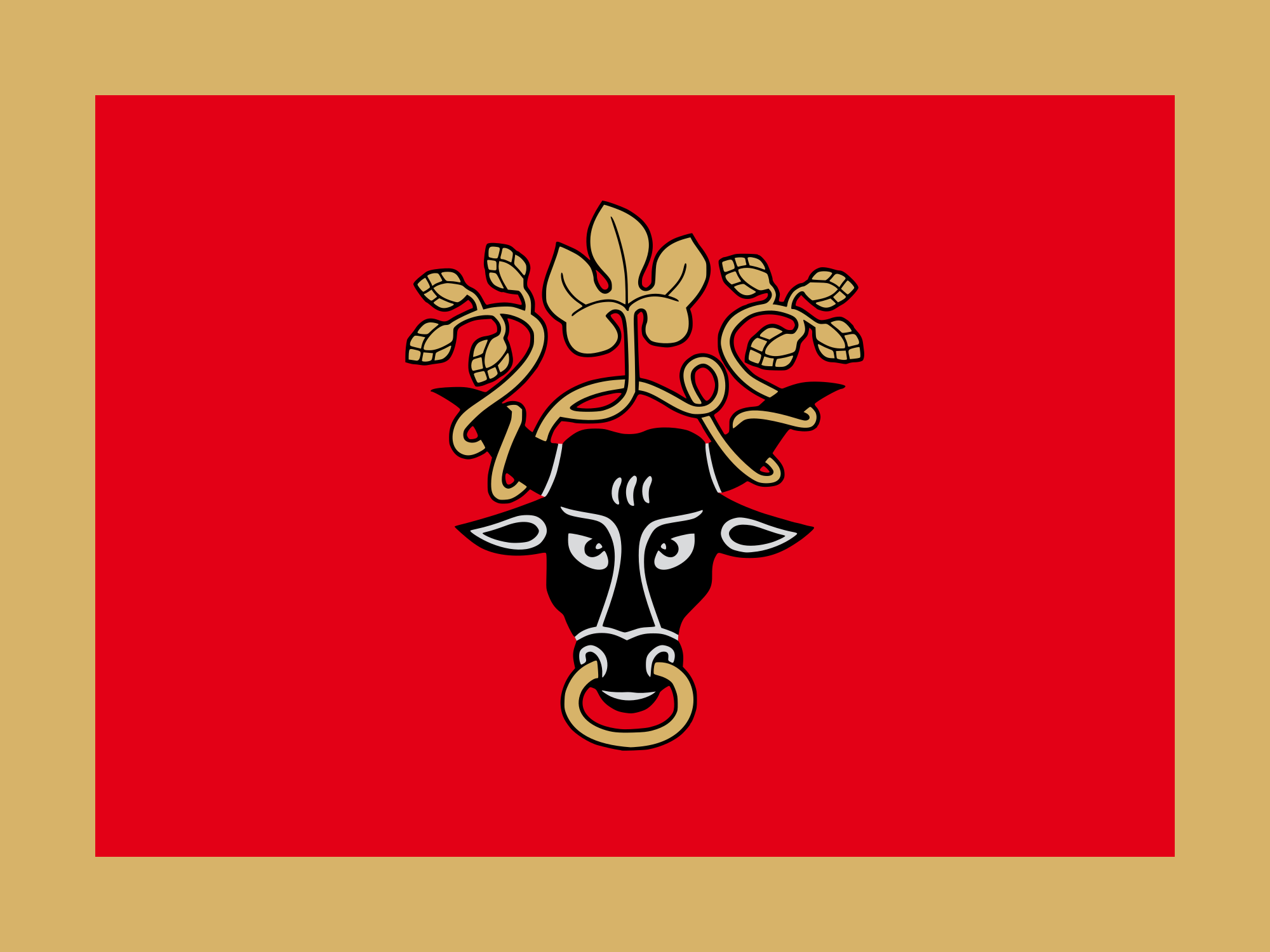
- Flag Coat of arms

- Location of Pasvalys
- Coordinates: 56°3′34″N 24°24′13″E
- Country: Lithuania
- Ethnographic region: Aukštaitija
- County: Panevėžys County
- Municipality: Pasvalys district municipality
- Eldership: Pasvalys city eldership
- Capital of: Pasvalys district municipality Pasvalys city eldership Pasvalys rural eldership
- First mentioned: 1497
- Granted city rights: 1946

Population (2023)
  - Total: 6,411
- Time zone: UTC+2 (EET)
  - Summer (DST): UTC+3 (EEST)
- Website: www.pasvalys.lt

Pasvalys is a city in Panevėžys County, Lithuania, located near the bank of the Svalia River.

== History ==
In 1557, the Treaty of Pasvalys was signed in the town, which provoked Ivan IV of Russia to start the Livonian War. Pasvalys has mineral spring waters – in 1923 physician K. Armonas created a small sanatorium. At this time about 200 people spent time in sanatorium yearly.

Soviet occupation and mass deportations in 1941 were devastating – most of the most active teachers and civil servants, intellectuals were deported to remote regions in Russia and Central Asia.

In August 1941, 1349 Jews from the village and the surroundings were executed by an Einsatzgruppen of Germans and local collaborators as mentioned in the Jäger Report.

After 1944 Soviet mass deportations started again – the main target were farmers and their families. Hundreds of families were deported. The program of forced collectivization has started.

Since 1947 partisans of Pasvalys district fought against Soviet occupants. Pasvalys' partisans belonged to Algimantas military district (apygarda), later – to Vytis military district of the Lithuanian partisans. Most of the partisans operated in Žalioji rinktinė (The Green Squad), which was based in Žalioji giria (The Green Forest).

== Education ==
Pasvalys Gymnasium of Petras Vileišis

Pasvalys Gymnasium of Svalia

Lėvens primary school

== Industry ==
Pasvalys is famous for its farmhouse beer and is a part of Beer Route in Lithuania.

Cheese factory owned by the company Pieno Žvaigždės is located in the city.

== Sports ==
Pasvalys has its basketball club (which is now defunct)- BC Pieno žvaigždės.

It also has two football clubs- SK Sanžile (defunct) and FK Pasvalys who play in the 4th tier of Lithuanian football.

== Museums ==
Pasvalys Mill Museum

Museum of the Region of Pasvalys

== Gallery ==
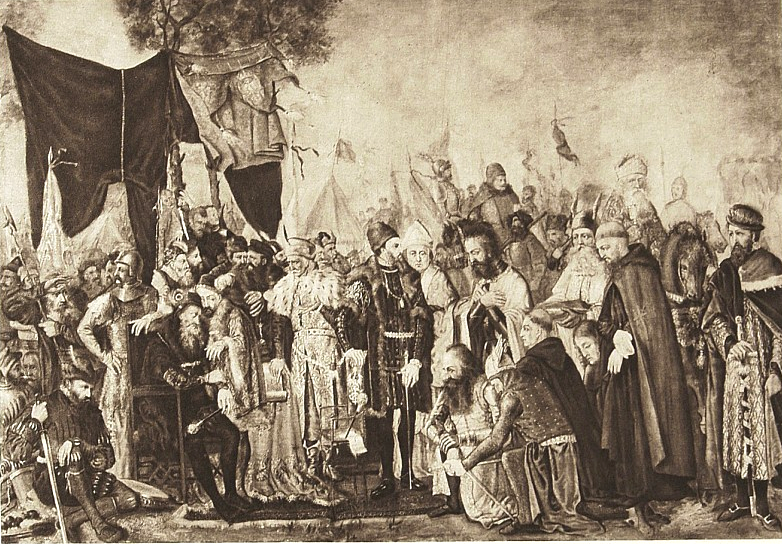
Treaty of Pasvalys, signed between Polish-Lithuanian King Žygimantas Augustas and the Livonian Order

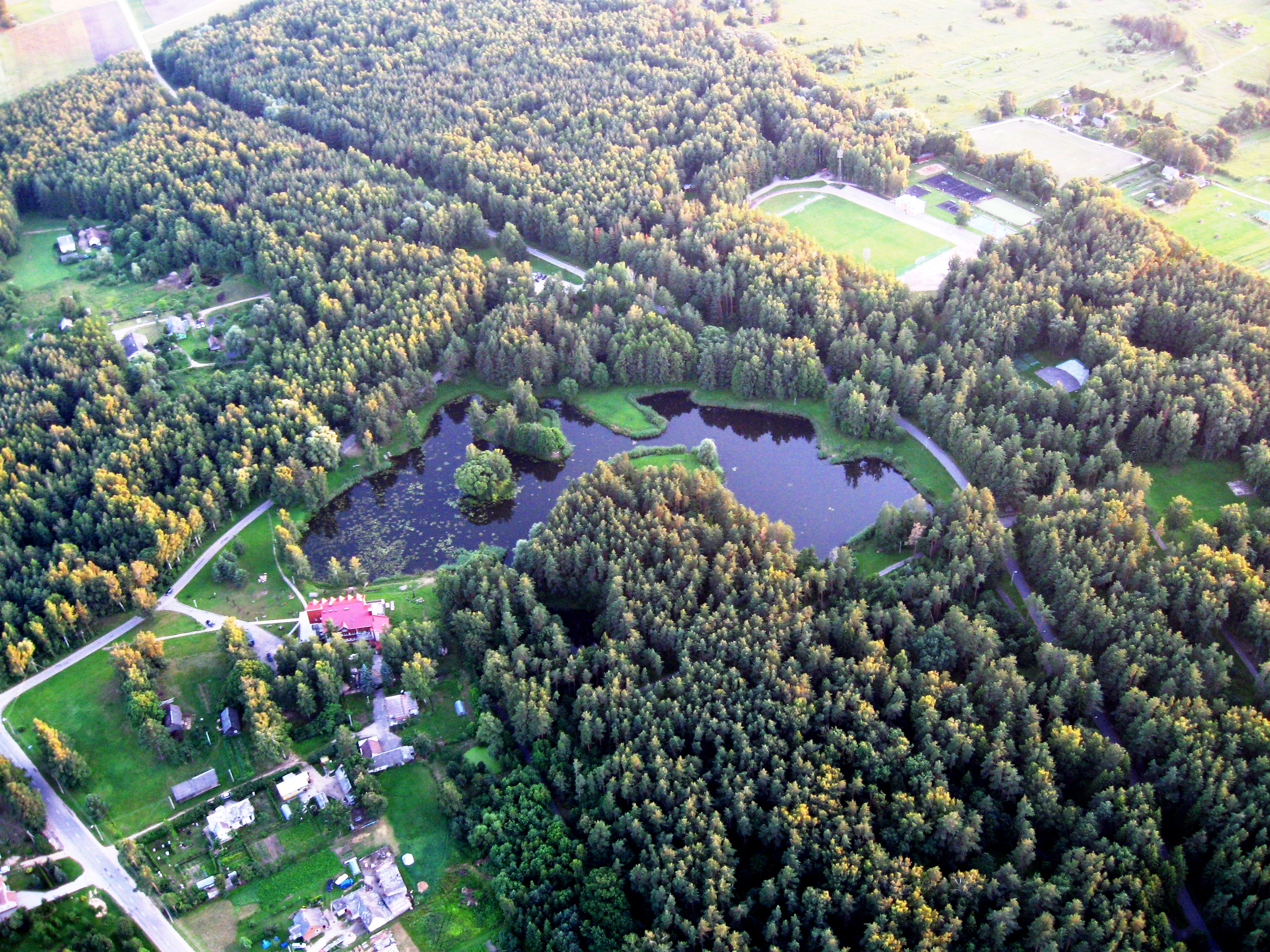
Pinewood and stadium

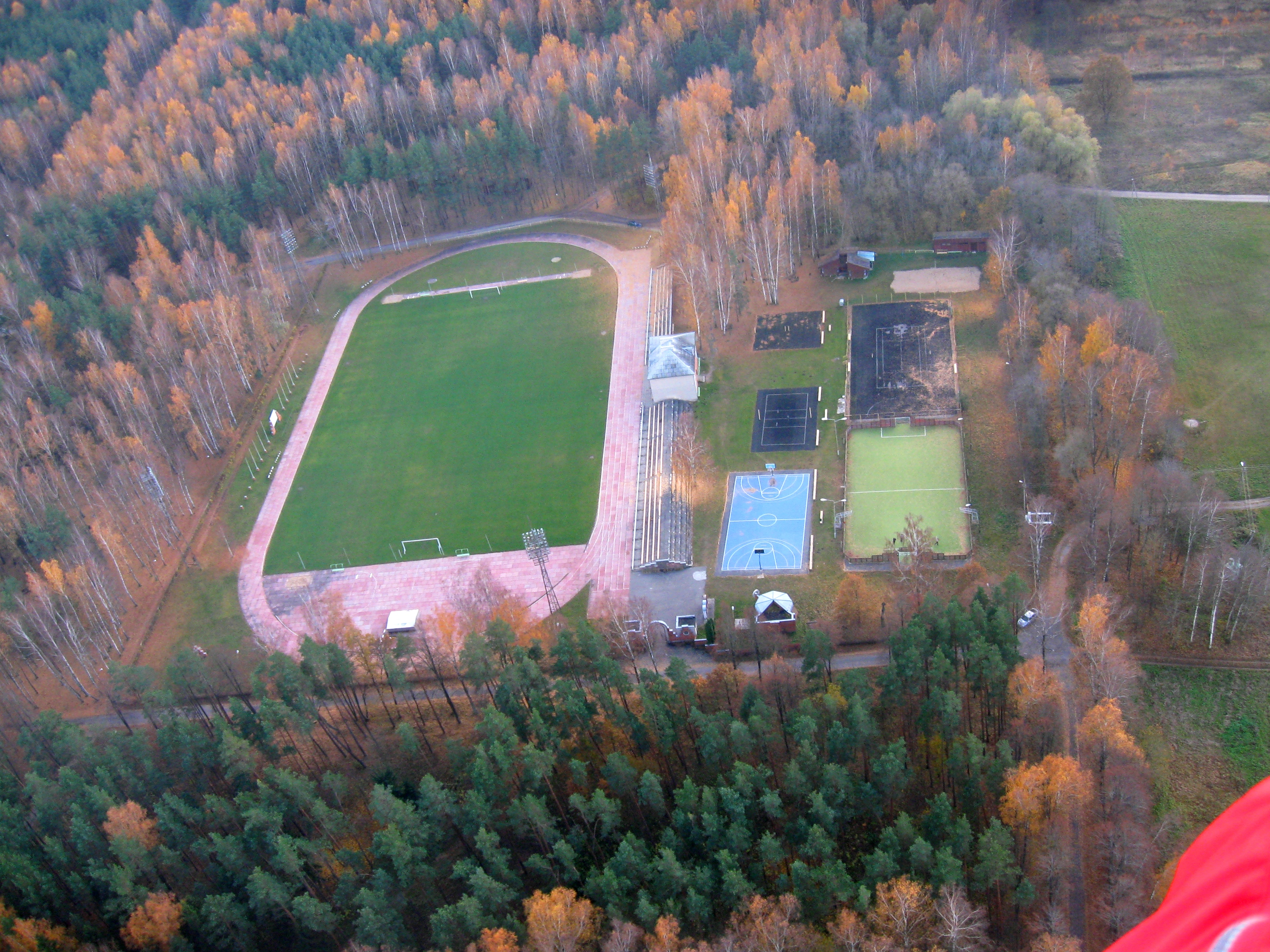
Pasvalys stadium

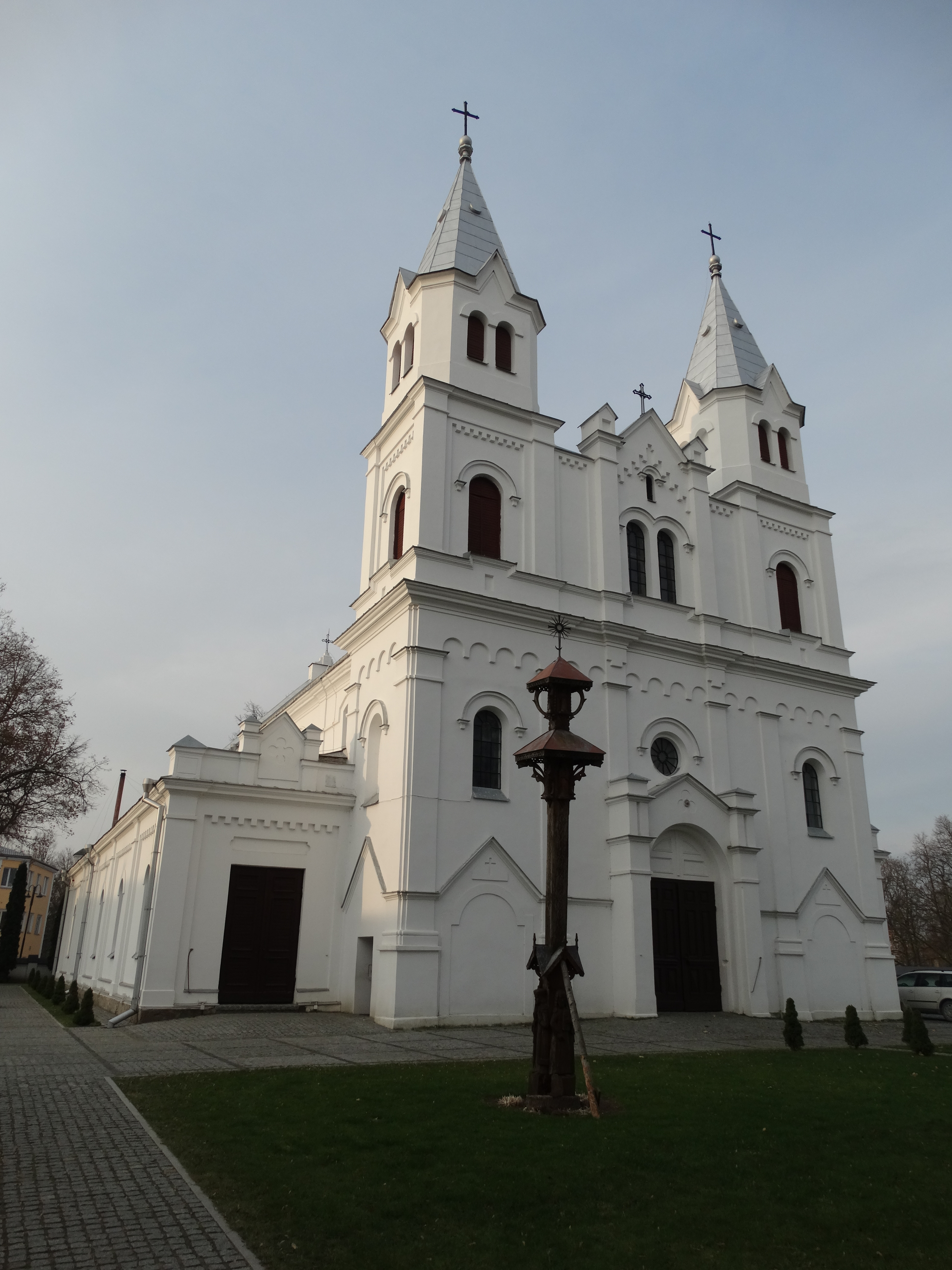
Church of St. John the Baptist in Pasvalys

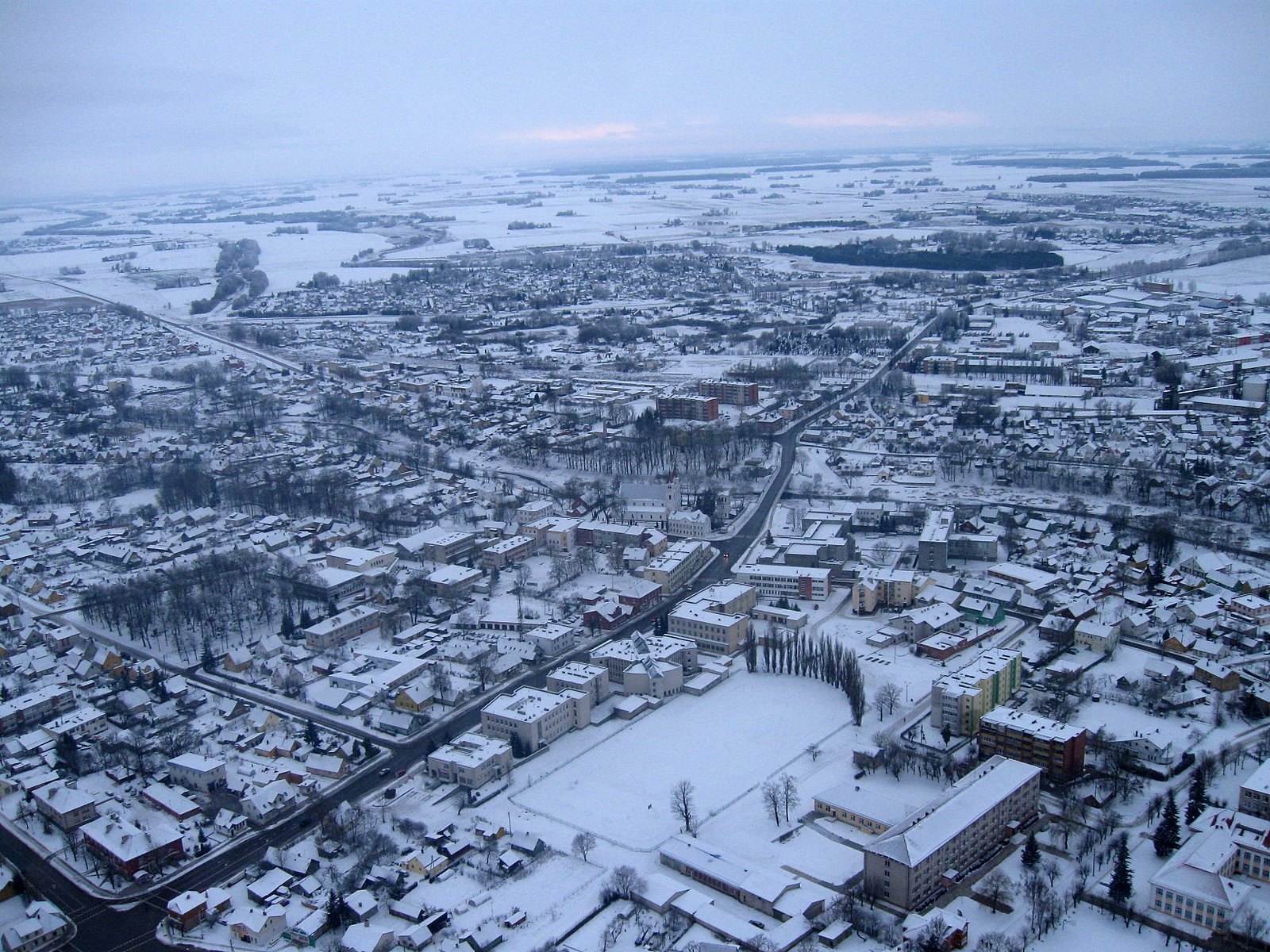
Pasvalys in winter

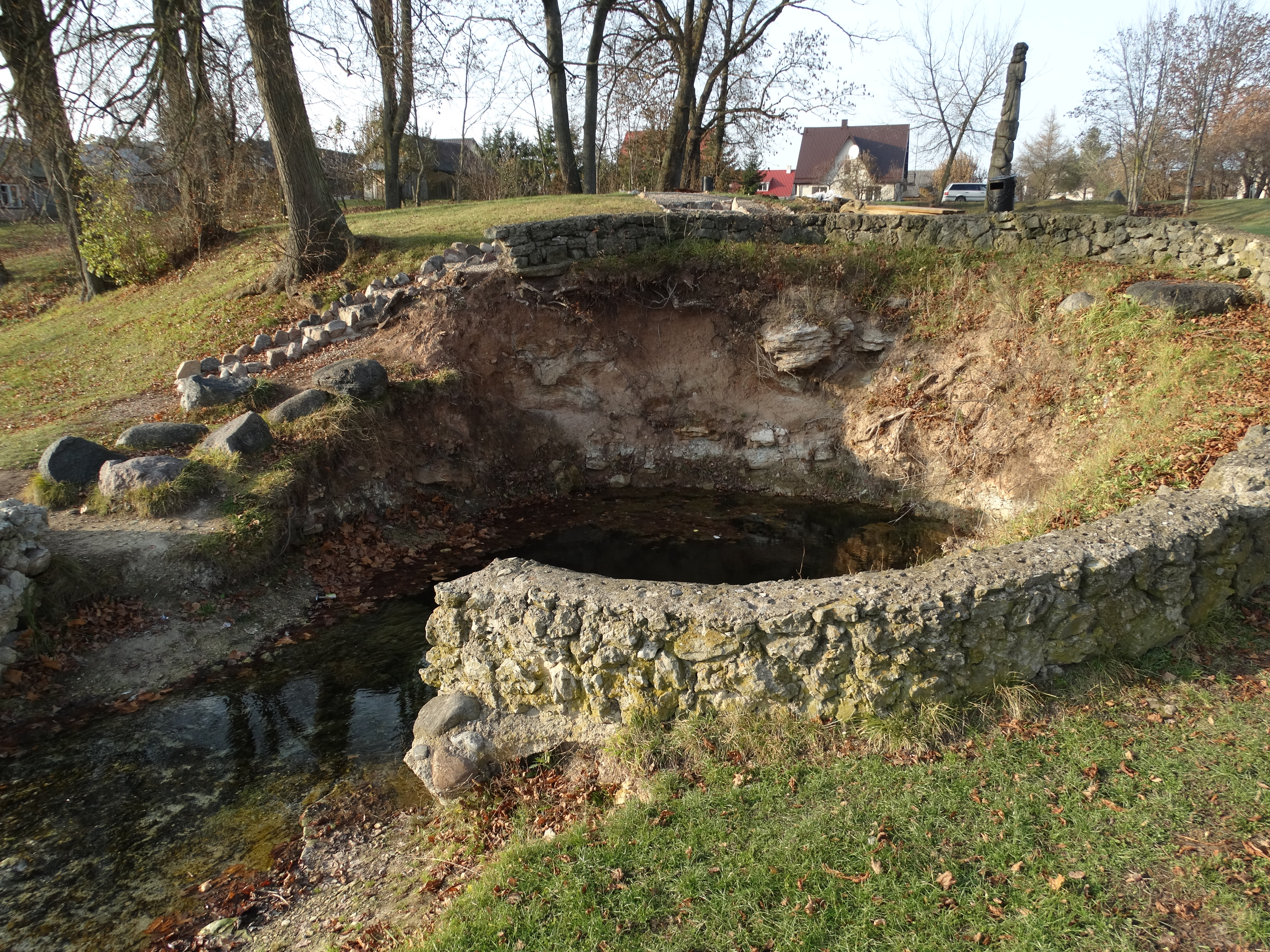
The Green Spring in Pasvalys

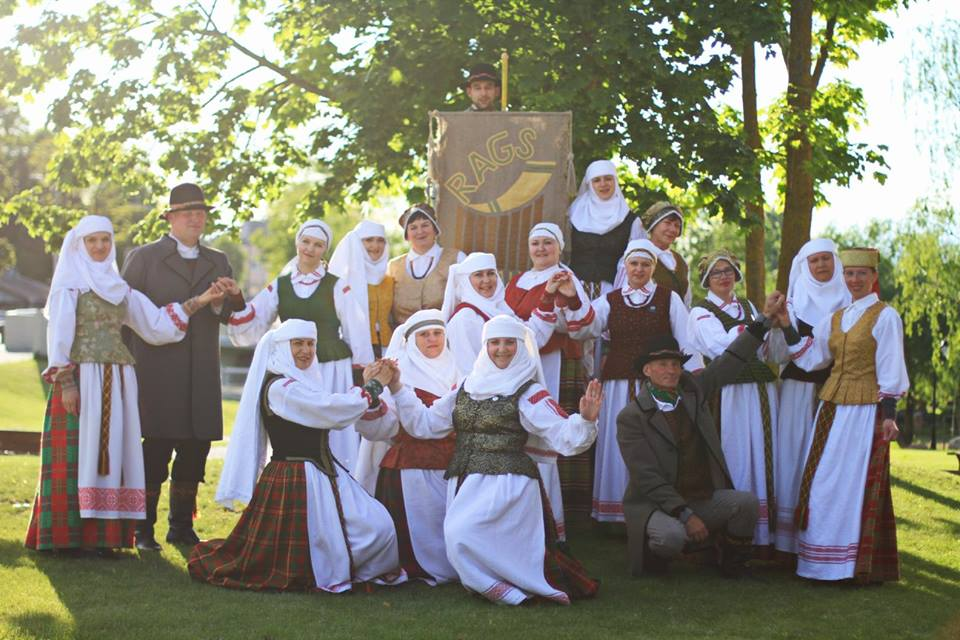
Folk ensemble Rags

=== Twin towns and Sister cities ===
Pasvalys is twinned with:

- Żory in Poland
