= Viešinta =

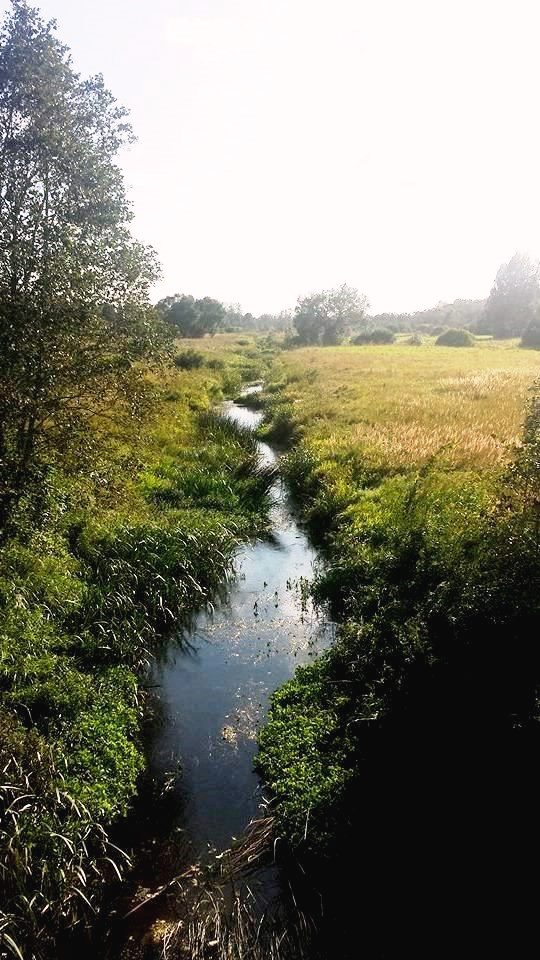

Location
- Country: Lithuania
- Region: Anykščiai district municipality, Utena County

Physical characteristics
- Mouth: Lėvuo
  - coordinates: 55.7857°N 24.7694°E
- Length: 29 km (18 mi)
- Basin size: 223 km^{2} (86 sq mi)

Basin features
- Progression: Lėvuo→ Mūša→ Lielupe→ Baltic Sea

Viešinta is a river of Anykščiai district municipality, Utena County, northeastern Lithuania. It flows for 29 kilometres (18 mi) and has a basin area of 223 km^{2} (86 sq mi). It is a left tributary of the river Lėvuo.
