= Žemaitijos pienas =

Dairy company

Žemaitijos pienas AB

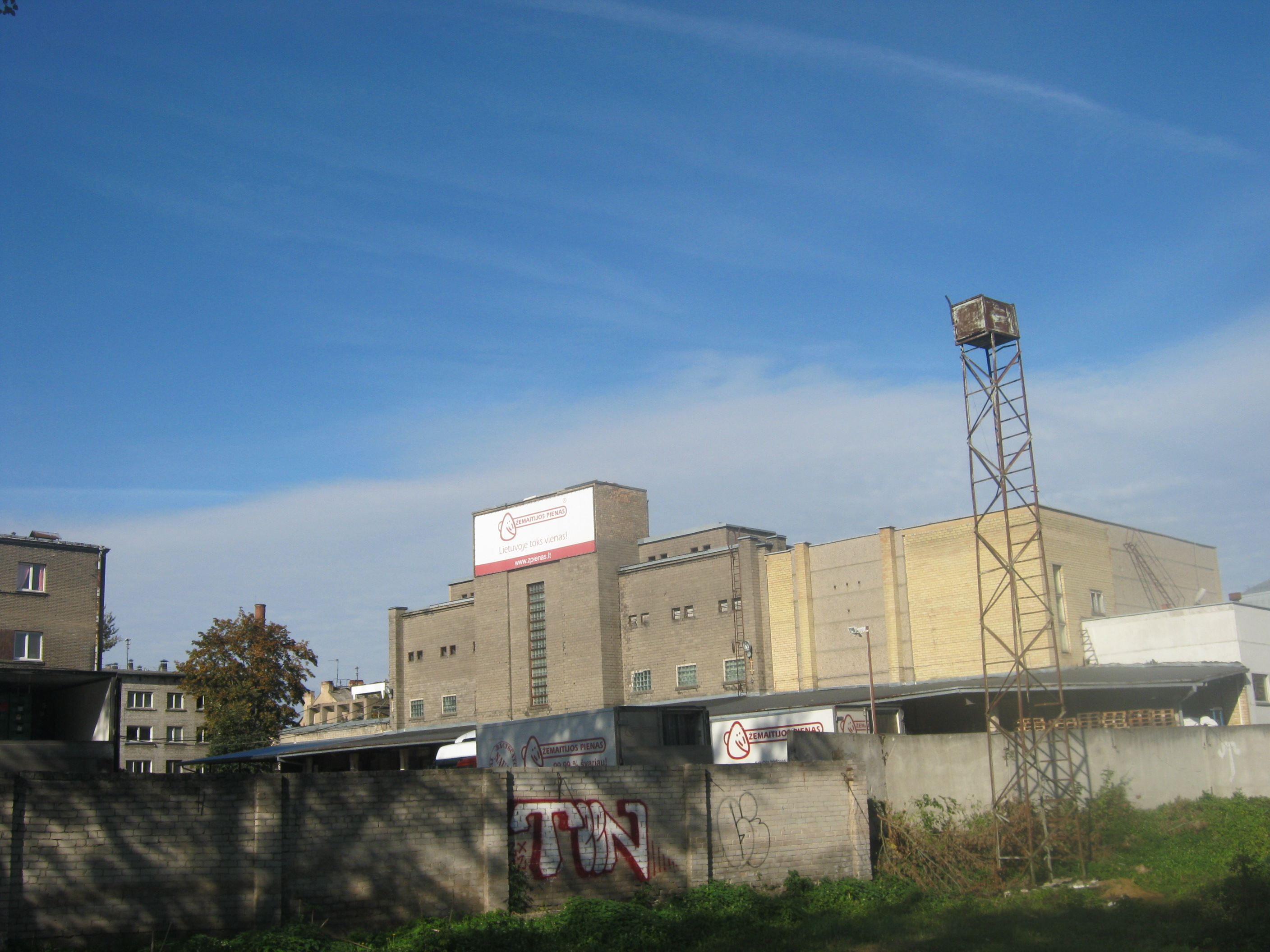
- Warehouse in Vilnius, 2012
- Type: Private
- Industry: Dairy
- Founded: 1993
- Headquarters: Sedos g. 35, Telšiai, Lithuania
- Key people: Robertas Pažemeckas (CEO)
- Products: Milk, yogurt, cheese, kefir
- Revenue: ▲€340.322 million (2025)
- Number of employees: 1,283 (2023)
- Website: www.zpienas.lt

Žemaitijos pienas is second-largest dairy products company in Lithuania. Company's name translated to English literally means Samogitia's milk.

Žemaitijos pienas is listed in the NASDAQ OMX Vilnius under the ticker symbol ZMP1L.

== History ==
Žemaitijos pienas was established in 1993. After privatization company built cheese factory. In 1995, it acquired AB Klaipėdos pienas, and in 1997 Šilutės Rambynas AB. Both companies were fully integrated into the concern.

In 2014, due to sanctions on Russia, the company stopped its exports to Kaliningrad.

Since 2015, the company has started exporting its products to Chile.

In 2019, Žemaitijos pienas started producing Ghee butter.

From 2020 Žemaitijos pienas started selling its products online.

In first quarter of 2023, Žemaitijos pienas profit grew by six times.

By end of 2024, Žemaitijos pienas is planning to buy two wind turbines from German company Enercon for €10 million.

== See also ==
- Pieno žvaigždės
- Rokiškio sūris
