= Rokiškio sūris =

Dairy company

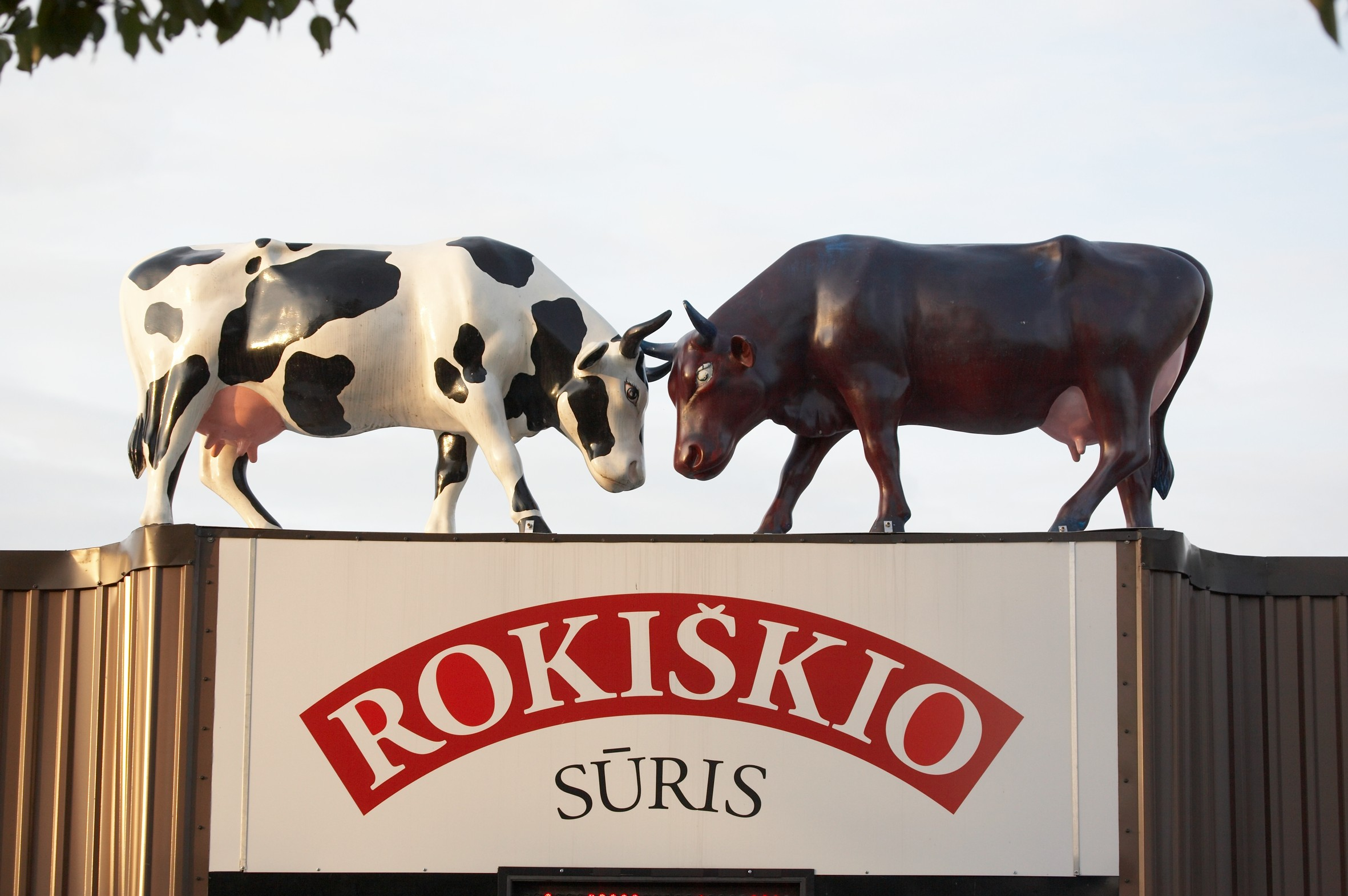
- Rokiškio sūris logo on building
- Type: Private
- Industry: Dairy
- Founded: 1992
- Headquarters: Pramonės g. 3, Rokiškis, Lithuania
- Key people: Dalius Trumpa (CEO)
- Products: Milk, yogurt, cheese
- Revenue: ▲€402.670 million (2025)
- Number of employees: 740 (2023)
- Website: www.rokiskio.com

Rokiškio sūris is one of the largest dairy products company in Lithuania and the largest cheese producer in the Baltic states.

Rokiškio sūris is listed in the NASDAQ OMX Vilnius under the ticker symbol RSU1L.

In 2014, due to sanctions on Russia, the company stopped its exports to Kaliningrad.

Since 2015, the company has started exporting its products to Chile.

Since 2017, Rokiškio has been exporting mozzarella cheese to China.

In 2017, New Zealand's dairy company Fonterra bought 10% of Rokiškio sūris shares.

Since 2021, Rokiškio sūris has been exporting its products to China via Poland due to decreased relations with China.

In Canada and the United States, some of the company's products were spotted for sale under Russian names.

== History ==
In 1957, first data on the production of dairy products in the old Rokiškis manor dairy have been recorded.

In 1961, the Council of Ministers of the Lithuanian Soviet Socialist Republic adopted a resolution on the construction of a cheese factory in Rokiškis.

In 1991, the company was privatized.

== See also ==
- Žemaitijos pienas
- Pieno žvaigždės
