= Kupa (Lėvuo) =

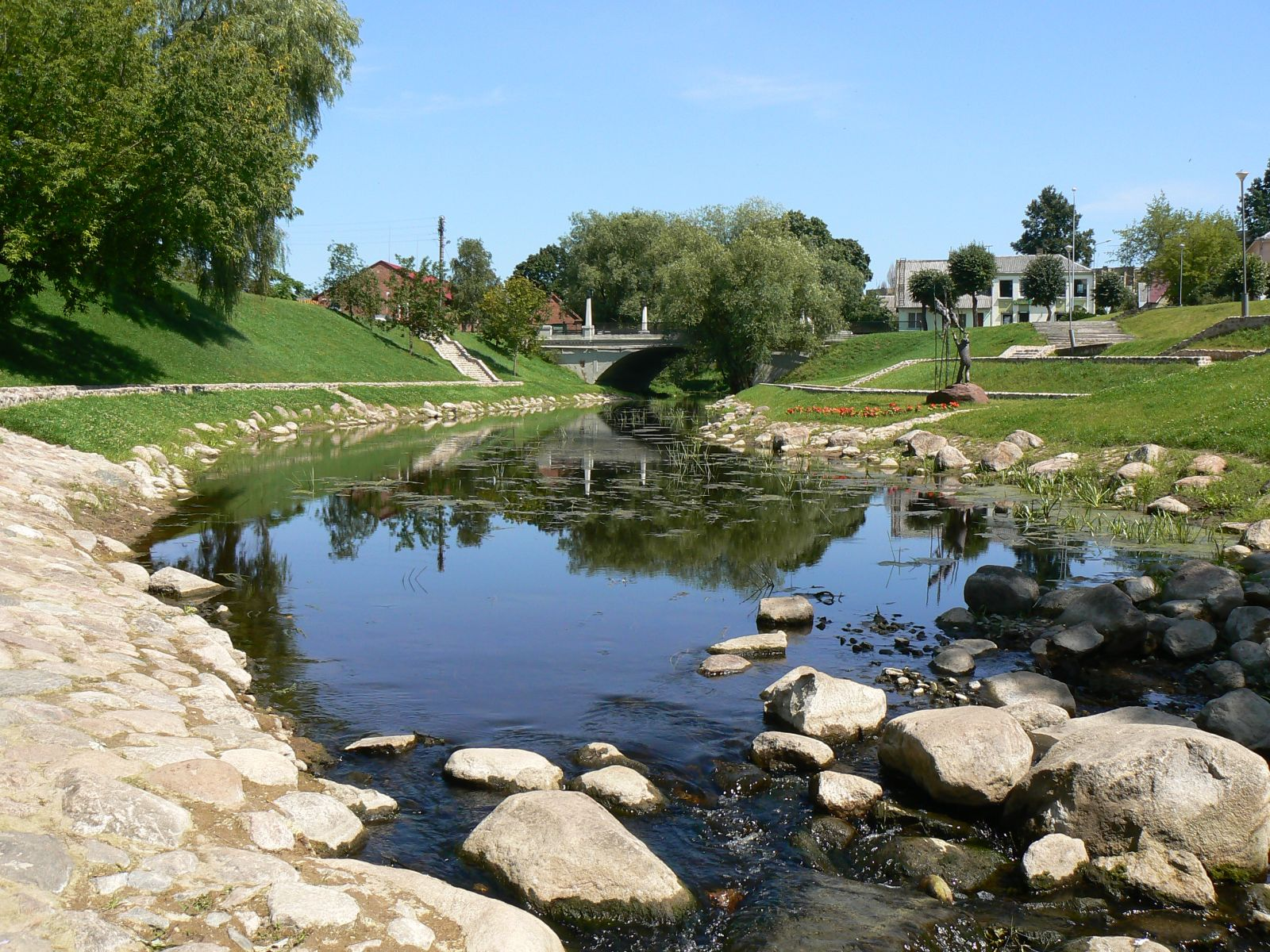
- Kupa at Kupiškis

Location
- Country: Lithuania

Physical characteristics
- Source
  - location: 5 km (3.1 mi) northeast from Šimonys
- Mouth: Lėvuo
  - coordinates: 55.8354°N 24.944°E
- Length: 27 km (17 mi)
- Basin size: 188 km^{2} (73 sq mi)
- Discharge
  - average: 1 m^{3}/s (35 cu ft/s)

Basin features
- Progression: Lėvuo→ Mūša→ Lielupe→ Baltic Sea

The Kupa is a small river in northern Lithuania and a left tributary of the Lėvuo. At first it flows to north but then near Juodupė town turns to the west. It flows through Kupiškis; the name of the town is derived from name of the river.
