= Lėvuo =

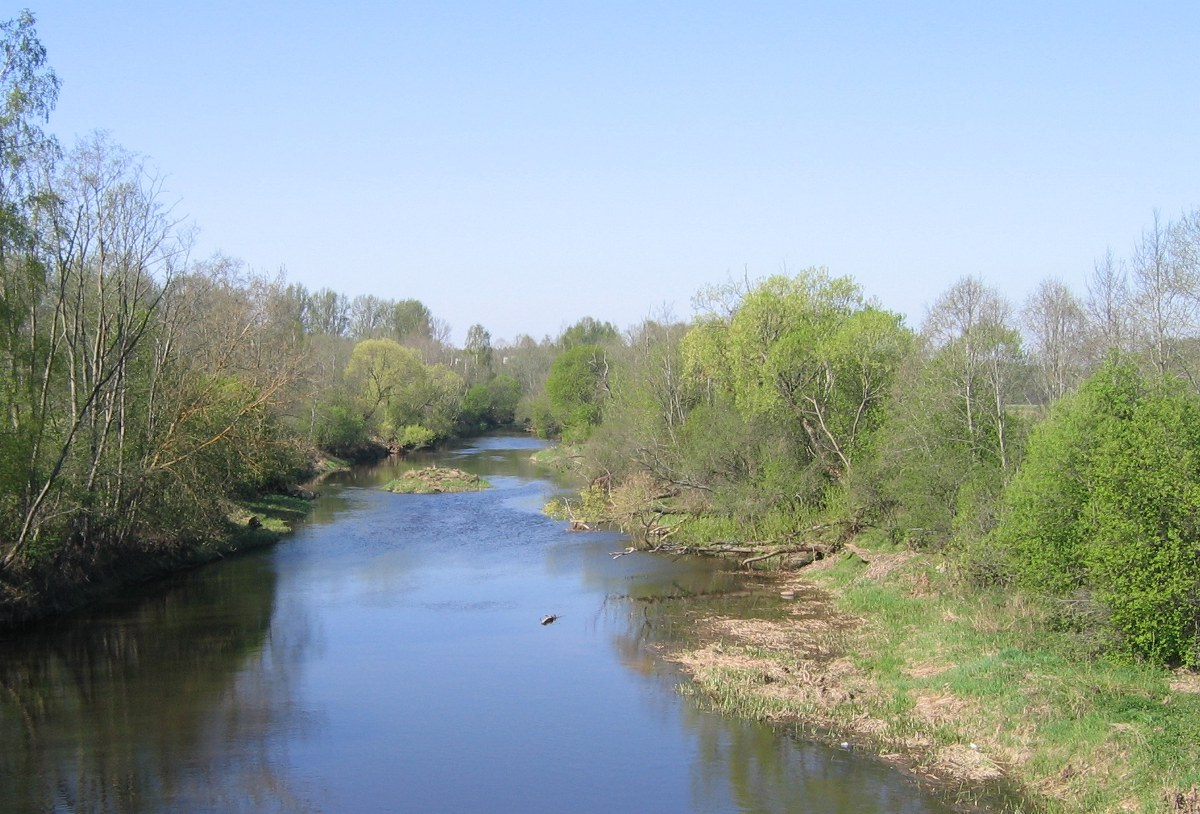
- Lėvuo near Akmeniai village

Location
- Country: Lithuania

Physical characteristics
- Source
  - location: Kupiškis district
- Mouth: Mūša
  - coordinates: 56.0840°N 24.4267°E
- Length: 148 km (92 mi)
- Basin size: 1,588 km^{2} (613 sq mi)
- Discharge
  - average: 9.02 m^{3}/s (319 cu ft/s)

Basin features
- Progression: Mūša→ Lielupe→ Baltic Sea
- Tributaries
  - left: Kupa, Viešinta
  - right: Svalia

The Lėvuo is a river in Northern Lithuania, a right tributary of the river Mūša. Lėvuo is 148 kilometres long. In 1931 Sanžilė channel, connecting Lėvuo and Nevėžis rivers was built. The largest tributaries of Lėvuo are Mituva, Svalia, Kupa and Viešinta.
