= Svalia (river) =

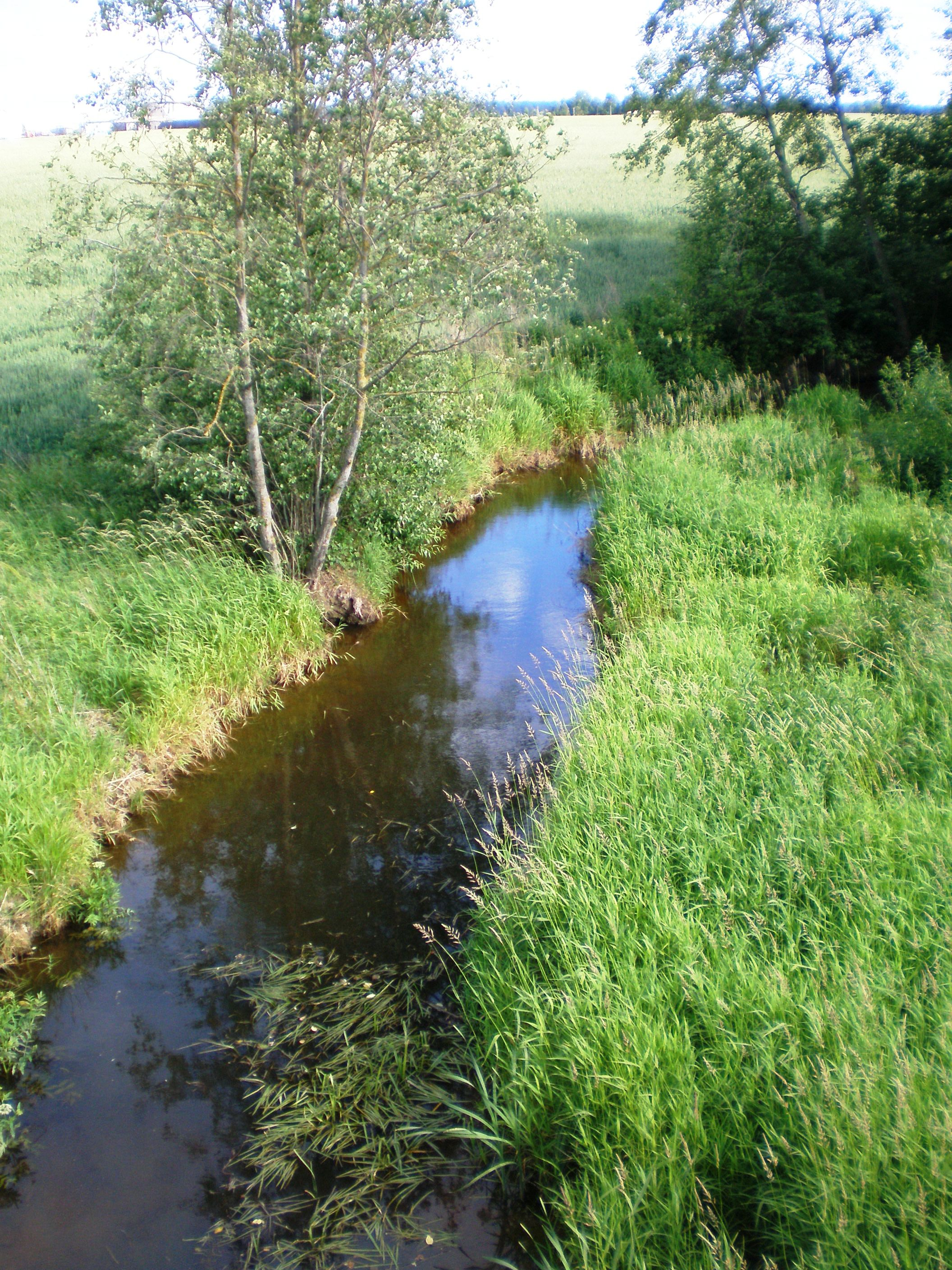
- The Svalia near Pasvalys

Location
- Country: Lithuania

Physical characteristics
- Source
  - location: Klimbalė Marsh
- Mouth: Lėvuo
  - coordinates: 56°3′42″N 24°23′49″E
- Length: 36 km (22 mi)
- Basin size: 72 km^{2} (28 sq mi)
- Discharge
  - average: 0.4 m^{3}/s (14 cu ft/s)

Basin features
- Progression: Lėvuo→ Mūša→ Lielupe→ Baltic Sea

The Svalia is a 36-km long river in northern Lithuania and a right tributary of the Lėvuo river.

The town of Pasvalys is located near the mouth of the Svalia and is named after it. Pasvalys in Lithuanian language means "[town] near Svalia".
