= Radviliškis Eldership =

Eldership of Lithuania

The Radviliškis Eldership (Lithuanian: Radviliškio seniūnija) is an eldership of Lithuania, located in the Radviliškis District Municipality. In 2021 its population was 2511.
