= Žasliai Eldership =

Eldership of Lithuania

The Žasliai Eldership (Lithuanian: Žaslių seniūnija) is an eldership of Lithuania, located in the Kaišiadorys District Municipality. In 2021 its population was 1841.
