= Rozalimas Eldership =

Eldership of Lithuania

The Rozalimas Eldership (Lithuanian: Rozalimo seniūnija) is an eldership of Lithuania, located in the Pakruojis District Municipality. In 2021 its population was 1752.
