= Kintai Eldership =

Eldership of Lithuania

The Kintai Eldership (Lithuanian: Kintų seniūnija) is an eldership of Lithuania, located in the Šilutė District Municipality. In 2021 its population was 1442.
