= Mindūnai Eldership =

Eldership of Lithuania

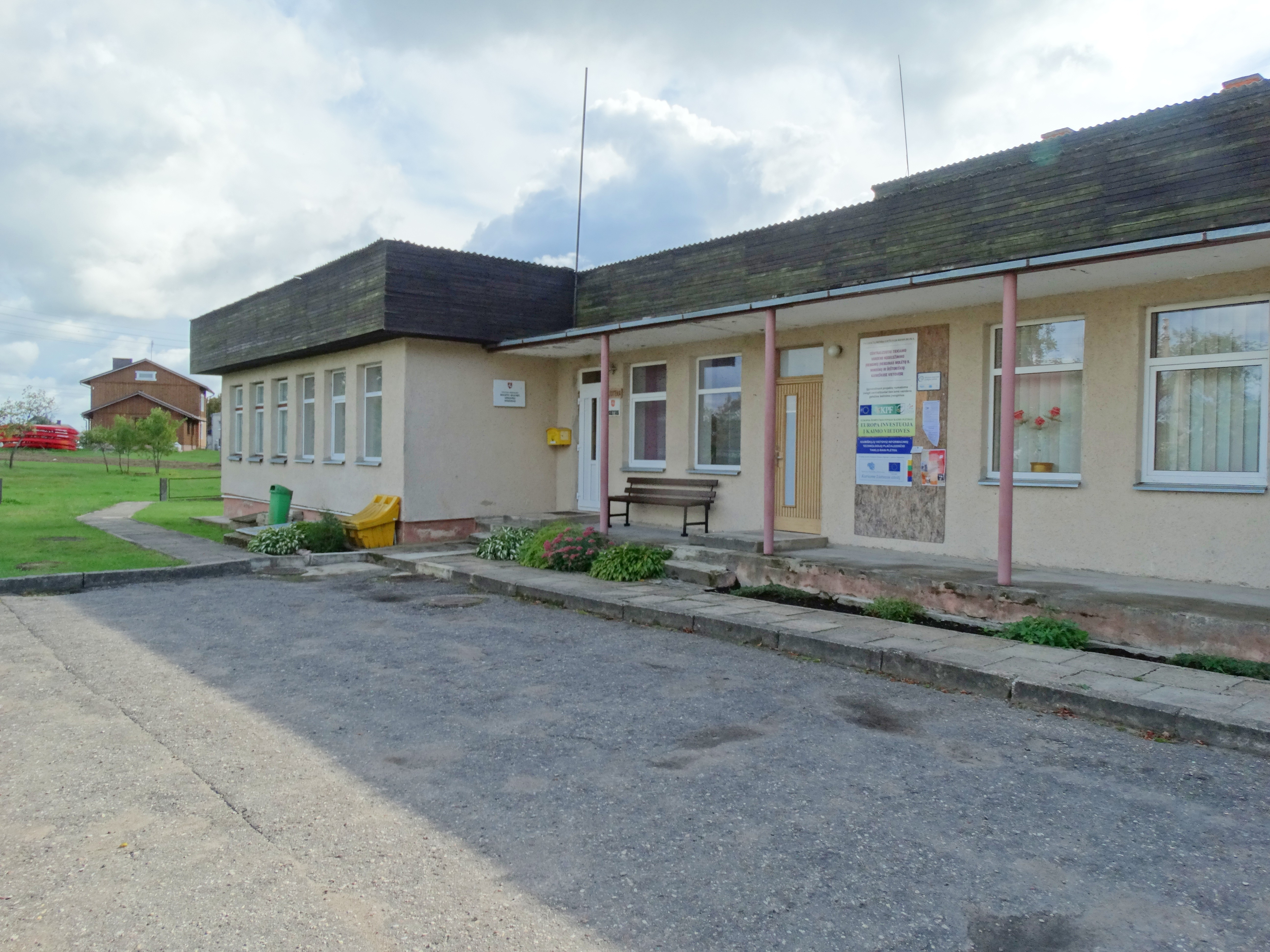

The Mindūnai Eldership (Lithuanian: Mindūnų seniūnija) is an eldership of Lithuania, located in the Molėtai District Municipality. In 2021 its population was 463.
