= Užventis Eldership =

Eldership of Lithuania

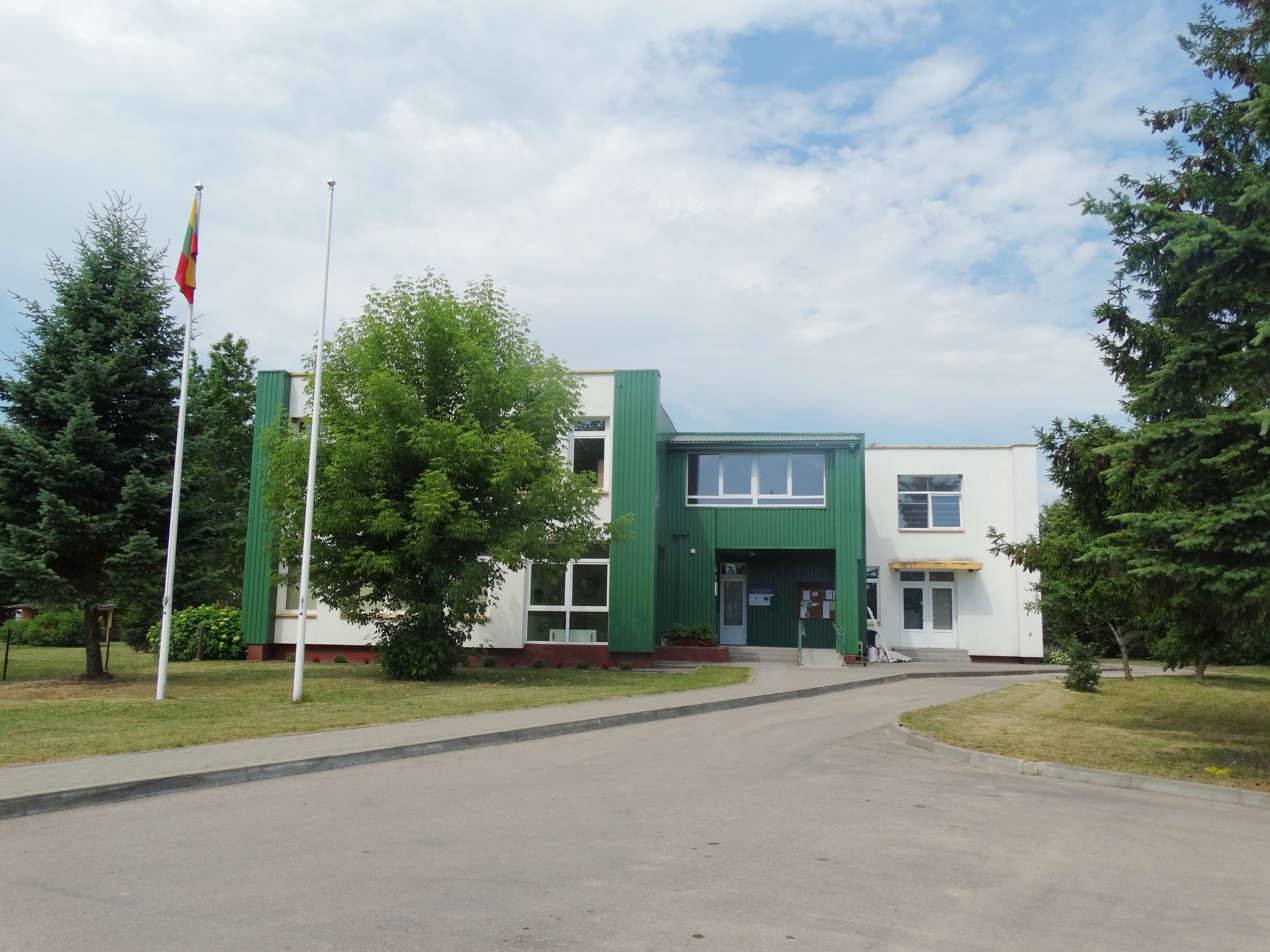
Užventis Eldership, Kelmė district, Lithuania

The Užventis Eldership (Lithuanian: Užvenčio seniūnija) is an eldership of Lithuania, located in the Kelmė District Municipality. In 2021 its population was 2493.
