= Alytus Area Eldership =

The Alytus Area Eldership (Lithuanian: Alytaus apylinkių seniūnija) is an eldership of Lithuania, located in the Alytus District Municipality. In 2021 its population was 4874.
