= Židikai Eldership =

Eldership of Lithuania

The Židikai Eldership (Lithuanian: Židikų seniūnija) is an eldership of Lithuania, located in the Mažeikiai District Municipality. In 2021 its population was 1834.
