= Kernavė Eldership =

Eldership of Lithuania

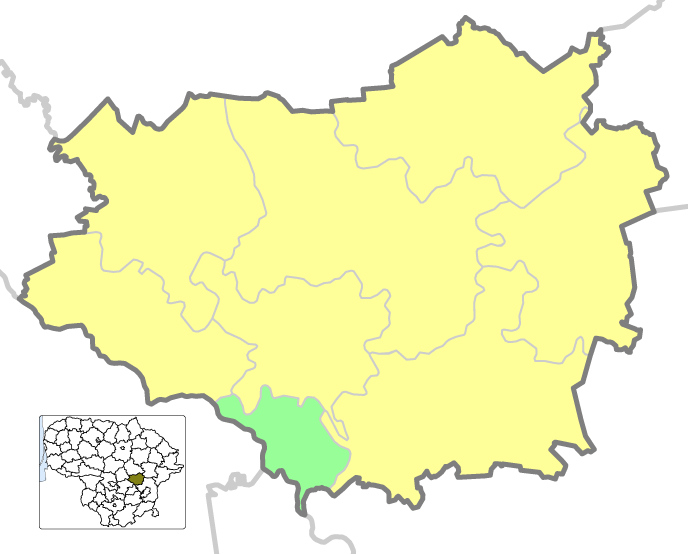
Location of Kernavė Eldership in Širvintos District Municipality

The Kernavė Eldership (Lithuanian: Kernavės seniūnija) is an eldership of Lithuania, located in the Širvintos District Municipality. In 2021 its population was 399.
