= Nemunaitis Eldership =

Eldership of Lithuania

The Nemunaitis Eldership (Lithuanian: Nemunaičio seniūnija) is an eldership of Lithuania, located in the Alytus District Municipality. In 2021 its population was 981.
