= Turmantas Eldership =

Eldership of Lithuania

The Turmantas Eldership (Lithuanian: Turmanto seniūnija) is an eldership of Lithuania, located in the Zarasai District Municipality. In 2021 its population was 957.
