= Lenkimai Eldership =

Eldership of Lithuania

The Lenkimai Eldership (Lithuanian: Lenkimų seniūnija) is an eldership of Lithuania, located in the Skuodas District Municipality. In 2021 its population was 742.
