= Kepaliai Eldership =

Eldership of Lithuania

The Kepaliai Eldership (Lithuanian: Kepalių seniūnija) is an eldership of Lithuania, located in the Joniškis District Municipality. In 2021 its population was 1416.
