= Šešuoliai Eldership =

Eldership of Lithuania

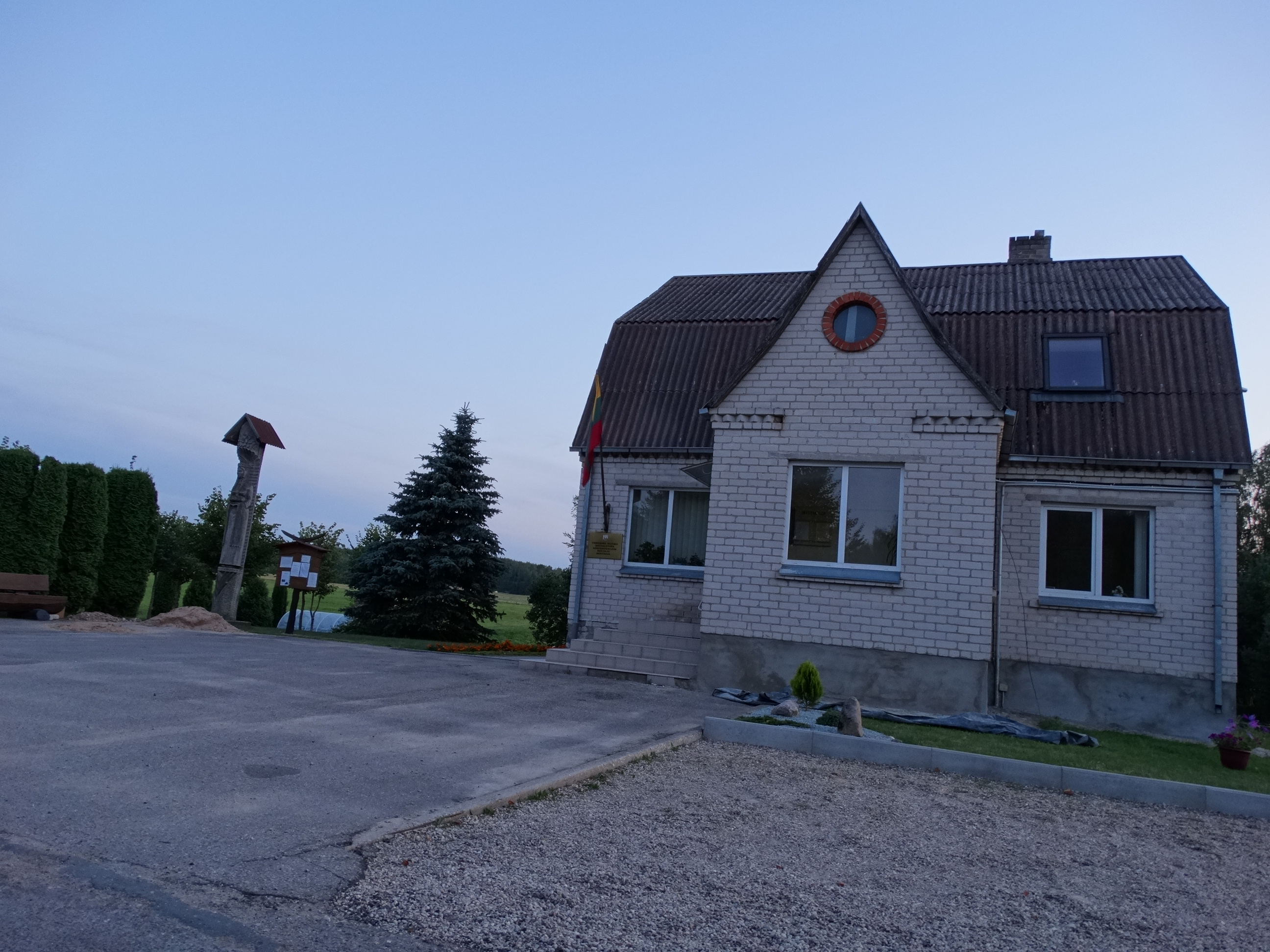
Eldership, Liaušiai, Ukmergė district, Lithuania

The Šešuoliai Eldership (Lithuanian: Šešuolių seniūnija) is an eldership of Lithuania, located in the Ukmergė District Municipality. In 2021 its population was 679.
