= Joniškėlis Area Eldership =

Eldership of Lithuania

The Joniškėlis Area Eldership (Lithuanian: Joniškėlio apylinkių seniūnija) is an eldership of Lithuania, located in the Pasvalys District Municipality. In 2021 its population was 2080.
