= Rusnė Eldership =

Eldership of Lithuania

The Rusnė Eldership (Lithuanian: Rusnės seniūnija) is an eldership of Lithuania, located in the Šilutė District Municipality. In 2021 its population was 1357.
