= Krokialaukis Eldership =

Eldership of Lithuania

The Krokialaukis Eldership (Lithuanian: Krokialaukio seniūnija) is an eldership of Lithuania, located in the Alytus District Municipality. In 2021 its population was 1788.
