= Alovė Eldership =

Coordinates: 54°21′0″N 24°10′12″E

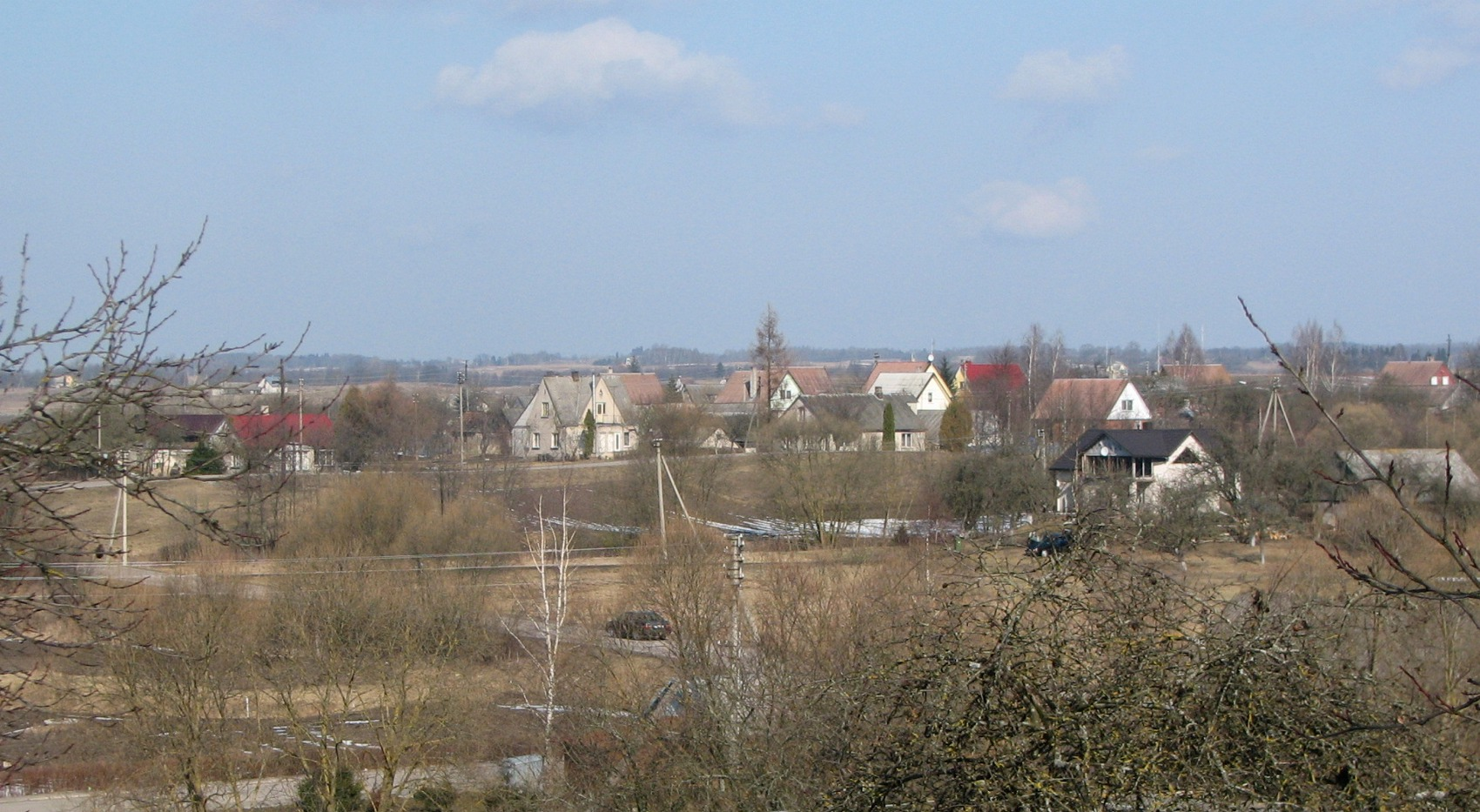
Alove view

The Alovė Eldership (Lithuanian: Alovės seniūnija) is an eldership of Lithuania, located in the Alytus District Municipality. In 2021 its population was 3112.
