= Raseiniai Eldership =

Eldership of Lithuania

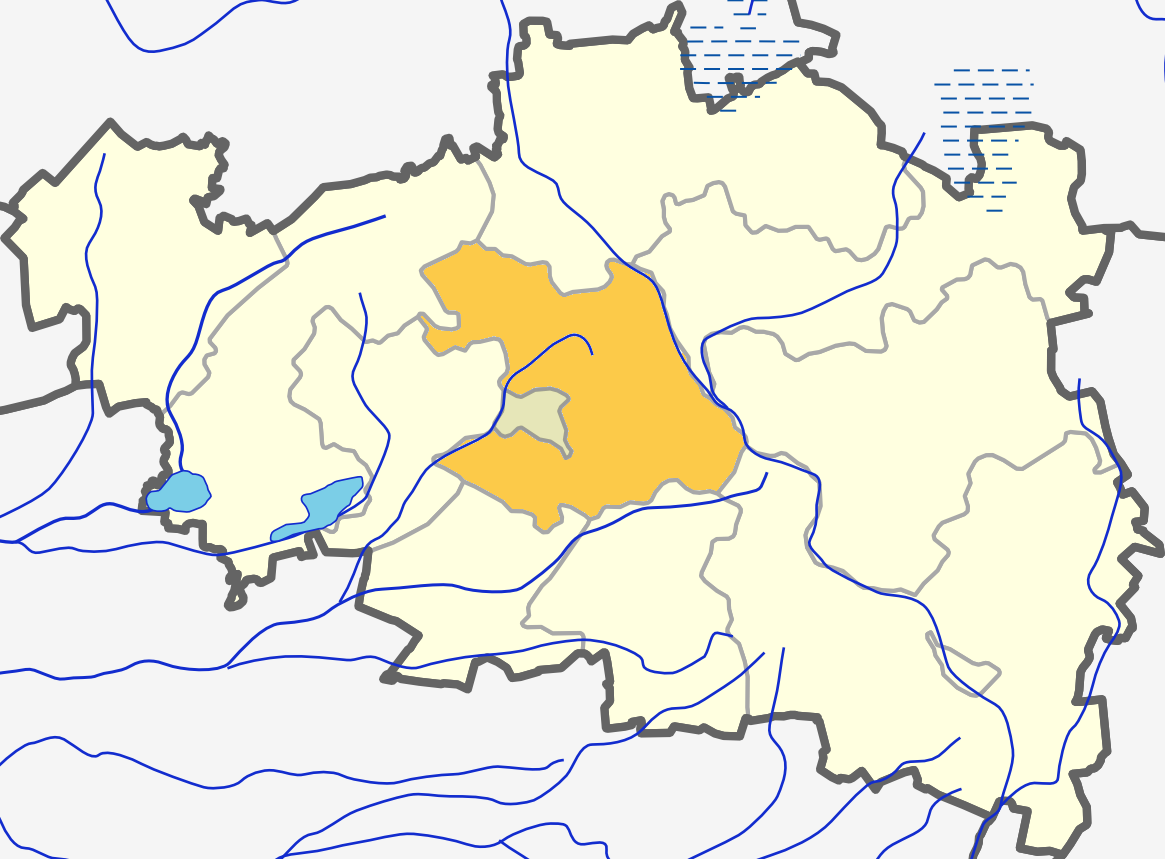
The location of Raseiniai eldership on the map of Raseiniai district

The Raseiniai Eldership (Lithuanian: Raseinių seniūnija) is an eldership of Lithuania, located in the Raseiniai District Municipality. In 2021, its population was 2,879.
