= Barzdai Eldership =

The Barzdai Eldership (Lithuanian: Barzdų seniūnija) is an eldership of Lithuania, located in the Šakiai District Municipality. In 2021 its population was 804.
