= Čiobiškis Eldership =

Eldership of Lithuania

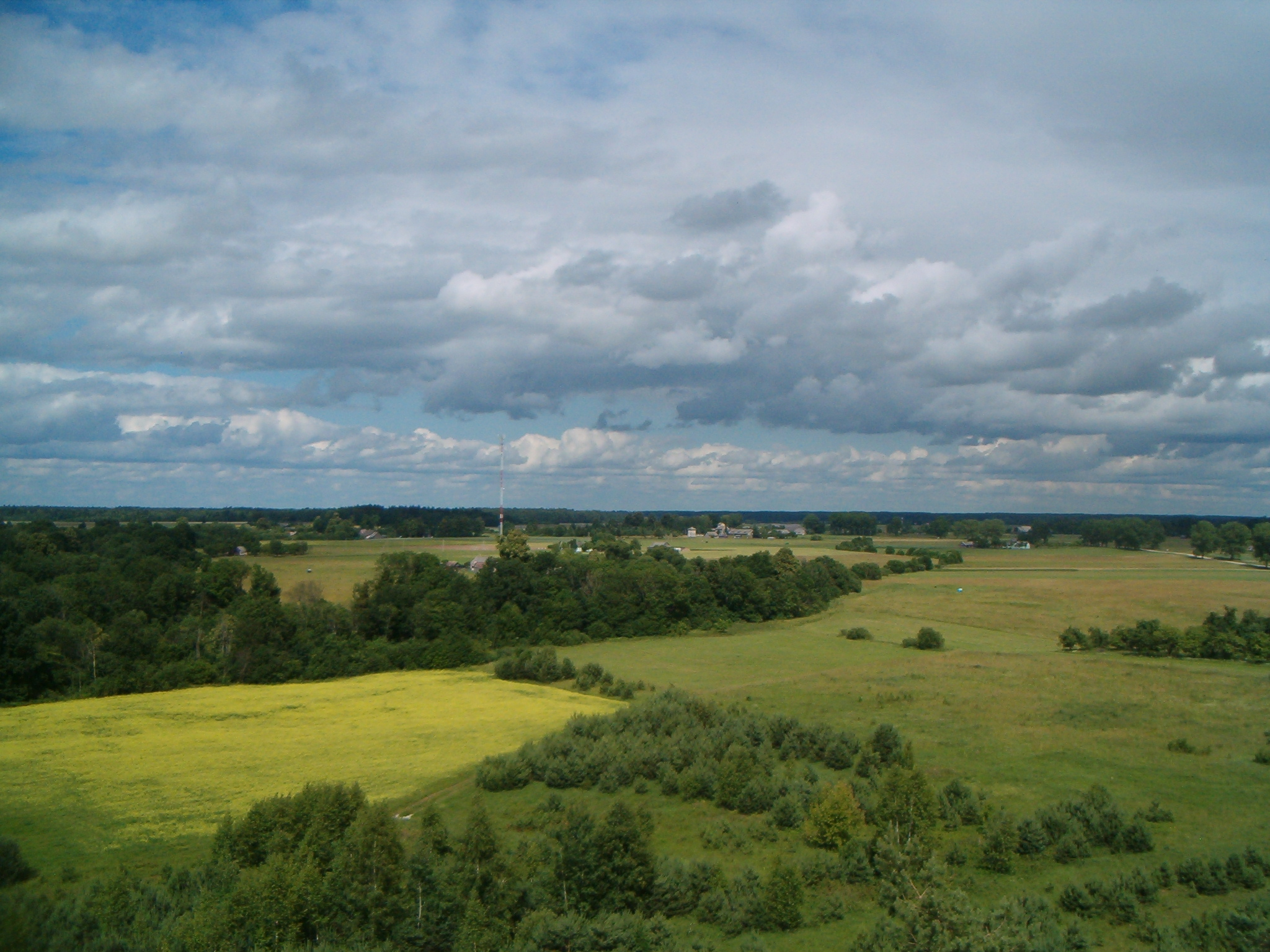

The Bijotai Eldership (Lithuanian: Čiobiškio seniūnija) is an eldership of Lithuania, located in the Širvintos District Municipality. In 2021 its population was 647.
