= Pašvitinis Eldership =

Eldership of Lithuania

The Pašvitinis Eldership (Lithuanian: Pašvitinio seniūnija) is an eldership of Lithuania, located in the Pakruojis District Municipality. In 2021 its population was 1260.
