= Pabarė Eldership =

Eldership of Lithuania

The Pabarė Eldership (Lithuanian: Pabarės seniūnija) is an eldership of Lithuania, located in the Šalčininkai District Municipality. In 2021 its population was 1119.
