= Žalgiris Eldership =

Eldership of Lithuania

The Žalgiris Eldership (Lithuanian: Žalgirio seniūnija) is an eldership of Lithuania, located in the Kretinga District Municipality. In 2021 its population was 3638.
