= Imbarė Eldership =

Eldership of Lithuania

The Imbarė Eldership (Lithuanian: Imbarės seniūnija) is an eldership of Lithuania, located in the Kretinga District Municipality. In 2021 its population was 1869.
