= Linkmenys Eldership =

Eldership of Lithuania

The Linkmenys Eldership (Lithuanian: Linkmenų seniūnija) is an eldership of Lithuania, located in the Ignalina District Municipality. In 2021 its population was 763.
