= Žagarė Eldership =

Eldership of Lithuania

The Žagarė Eldership (Lithuanian: Žagarės seniūnija) is an eldership of Lithuania, located in the Joniškis District Municipality. In 2021 its population was 2525.
