= Panevėžys Eldership =

Eldership of Lithuania

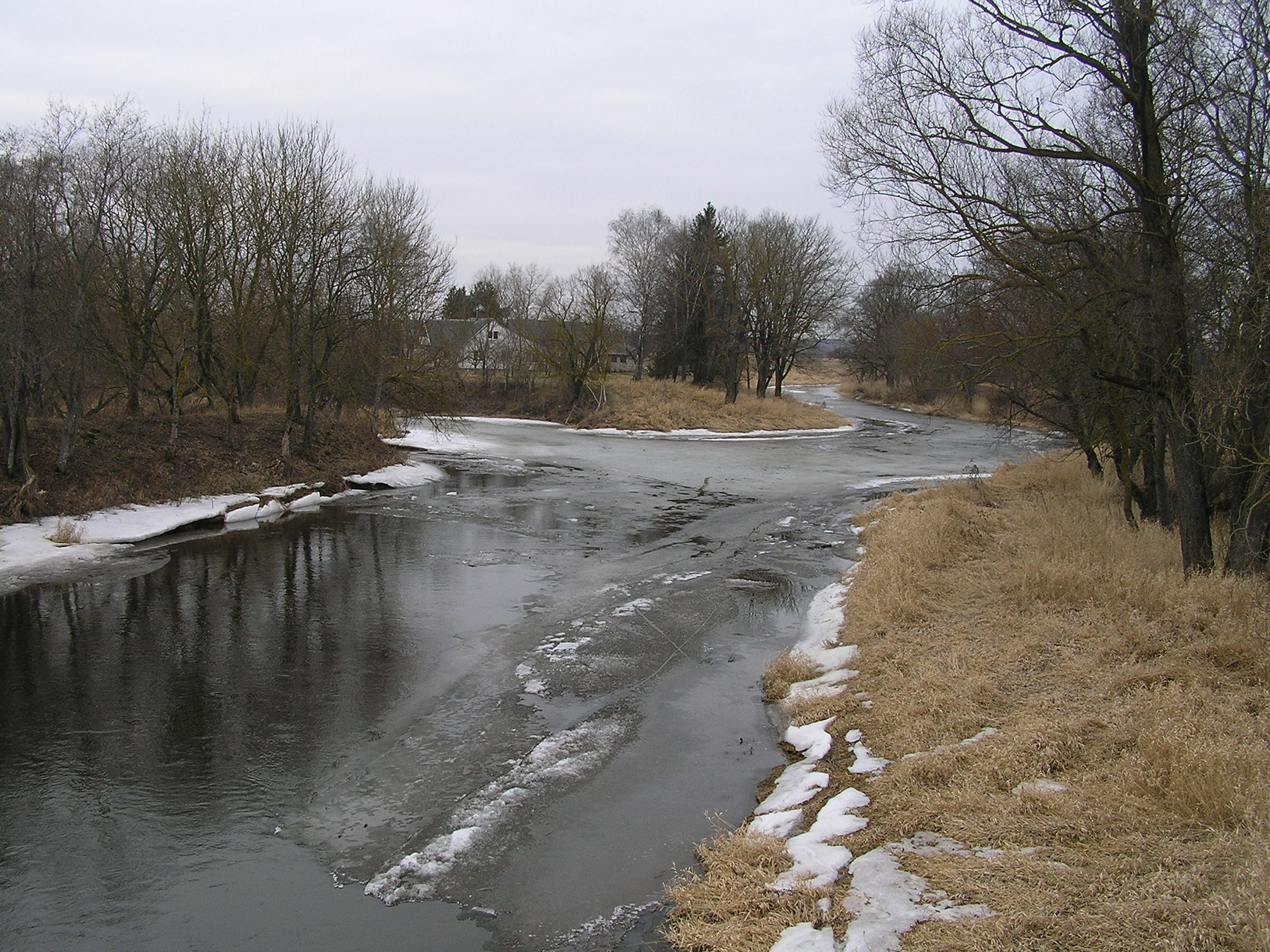
The intersection of the Leven and Sanzile rivers

The Panevėžys Eldership (Lithuanian: Panevėžio seniūnija) is an eldership of Lithuania, located in the Panevėžys District Municipality. In 2021 its population was 7583.
