= Nemakščiai Eldership =

Eldership of Lithuania

The Nemakščiai Eldership (Lithuanian: Nemakščių seniūnija) is an eldership of Lithuania, located in the Raseiniai District Municipality. In 2021 its population was 1520.
