= Skėmai Eldership =

Eldership of Lithuania

The Skėmai Eldership (Lithuanian: Skėmių seniūnija) is an eldership of Lithuania, located in the Radviliškis District Municipality. In 2021 its population was 971.
