= Videniškiai Eldership =

Eldership of Lithuania

The Videniškiai Eldership (Lithuanian: Videniškių seniūnija) is an eldership of Lithuania, located in the Molėtai District Municipality. In 2021 its population was 554.
