= Virbalis Eldership =

Eldership of Lithuania

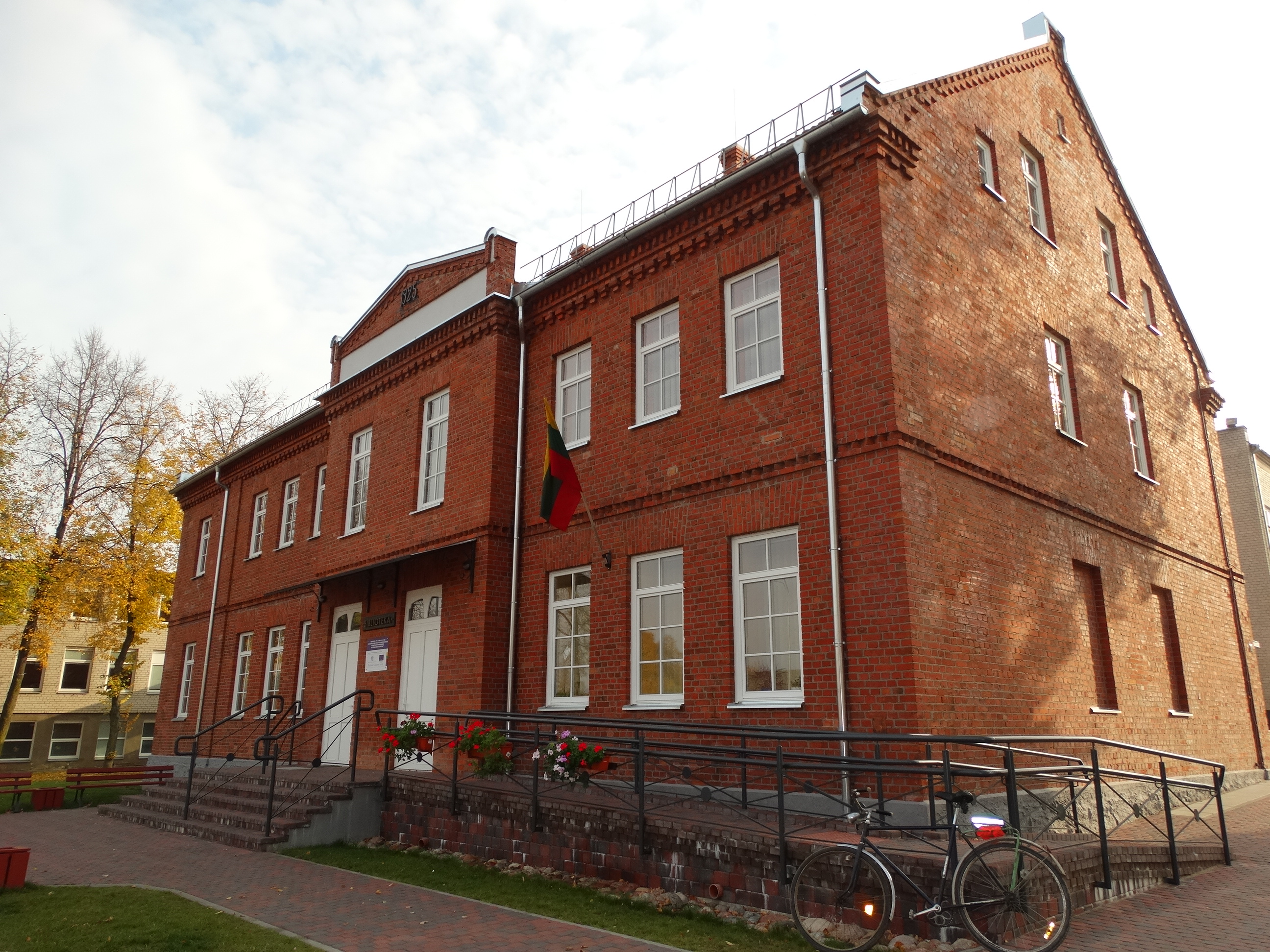

The Virbalis Eldership (Lithuanian: Virbalio seniūnija) is an eldership of Lithuania, located in the Vilkaviškis District Municipality. In 2021 its population was 1449.
