= Plokščiai Eldership =

Eldership of Lithuania

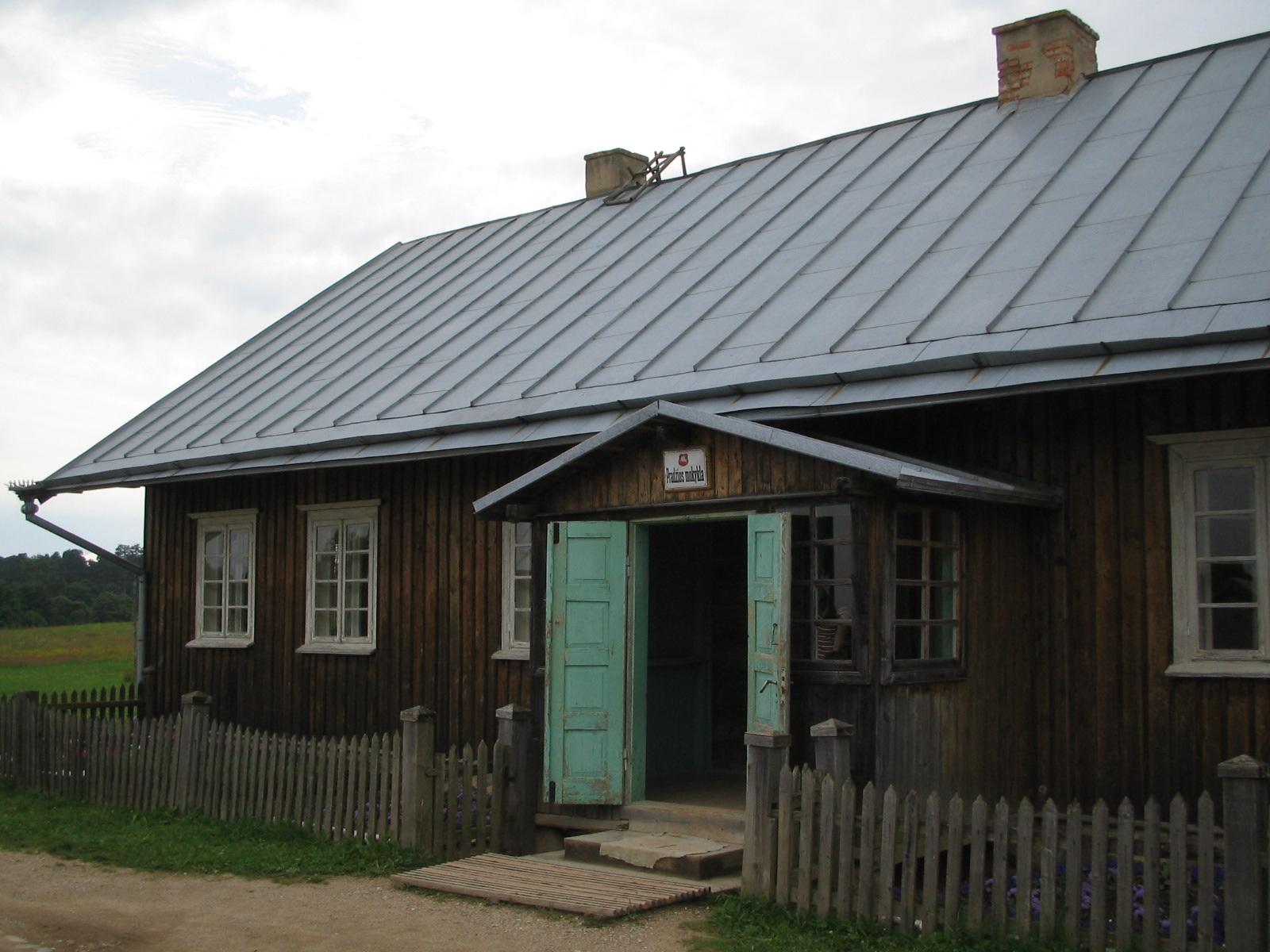
Plokščiai school building at Rumšiškės museum.

The Plokščiai Eldership (Lithuanian: Plokščių seniūnija) is an eldership of Lithuania, located in the Šakiai District Municipality. In 2021 its population was 776.
