= Baisogala Eldership =

The Baisogala Eldership (Lithuanian: Baisogalos seniūnija) is an eldership of Lithuania, located in the Radviliškis District Municipality. In 2021 its population was 3305.
