= Šeimena Eldership =

Eldership of Lithuania

The Šeimena Eldership (Lithuanian: Šeimenos seniūnija) is an eldership of Lithuania, located in the Vilkaviškis District Municipality. In 2021 its population was 4766.
