= Tyruliai Eldership =

Eldership of Lithuania

The Tyruliai Eldership (Lithuanian: Tyrulių seniūnija) is an eldership of Lithuania, located in the Radviliškis District Municipality. In 2021 its population was 610.
