= Žiežmariai Area Eldership =

Eldership of Lithuania

The Žiežmariai Area Eldership (Lithuanian: Žiežmarių apylinkės seniūnija) is an eldership of Lithuania, located in the Kaišiadorys District Municipality. In 2021 its population was 2688.
