= Nevarėnai Eldership =

Eldership of Lithuania

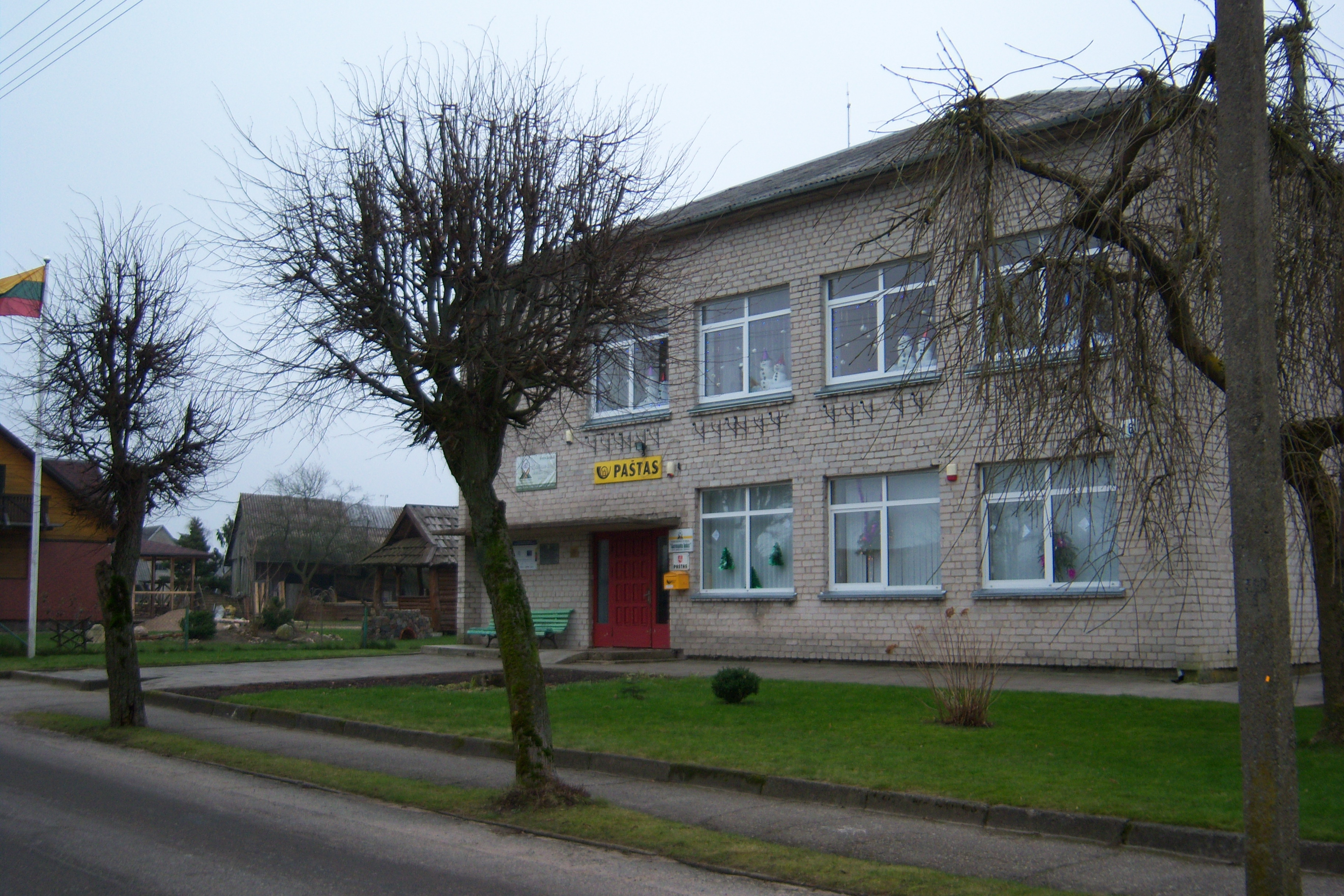

The Nevarėnai Eldership (Lithuanian: Nevarėnų seniūnija) is an eldership of Lithuania, located in the Telšiai District Municipality. In 2021 its population was 1251.
