= Elderships of Lithuania =

Smallest administrative divisions of Lithuania

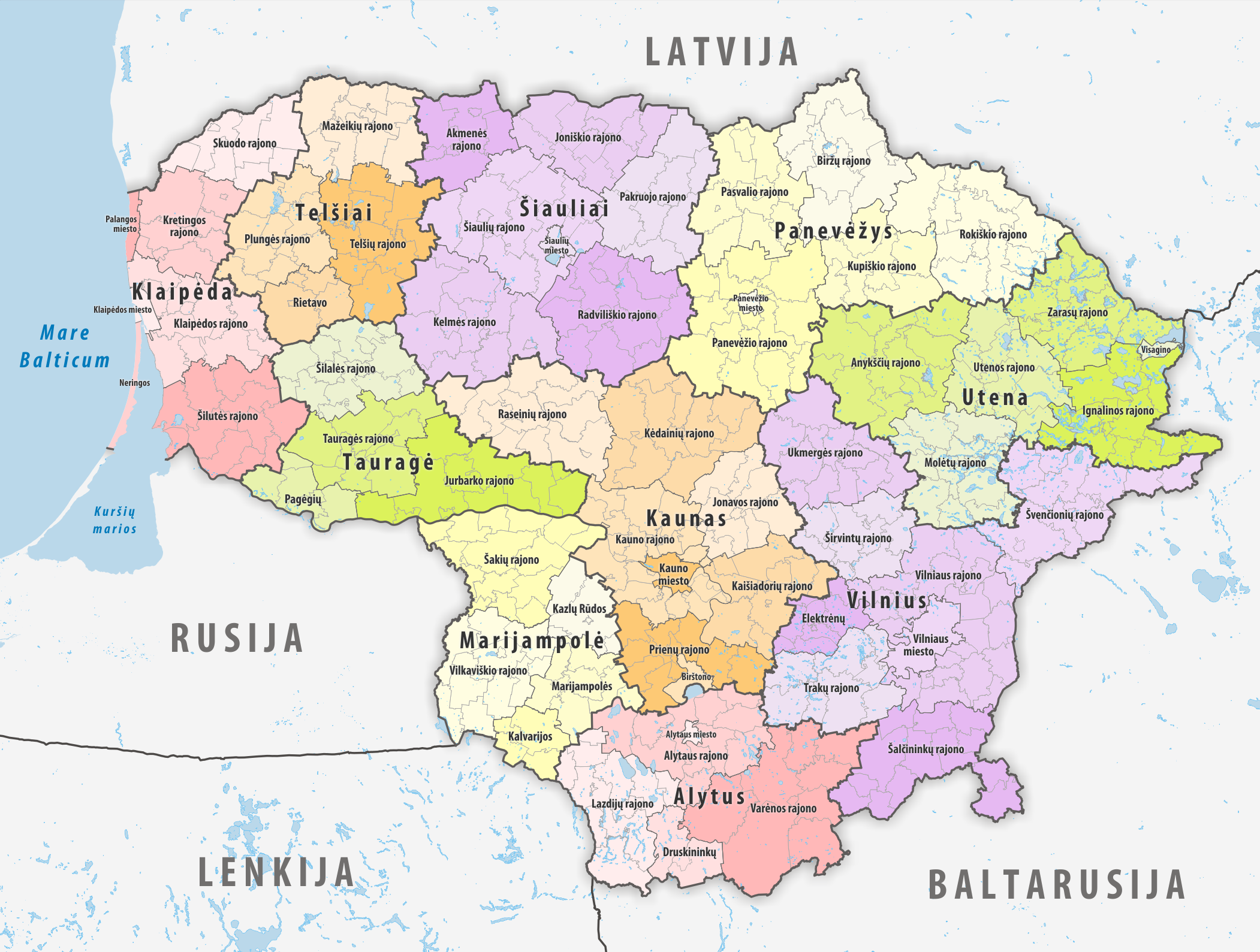
Seniūnijos of Lithuania

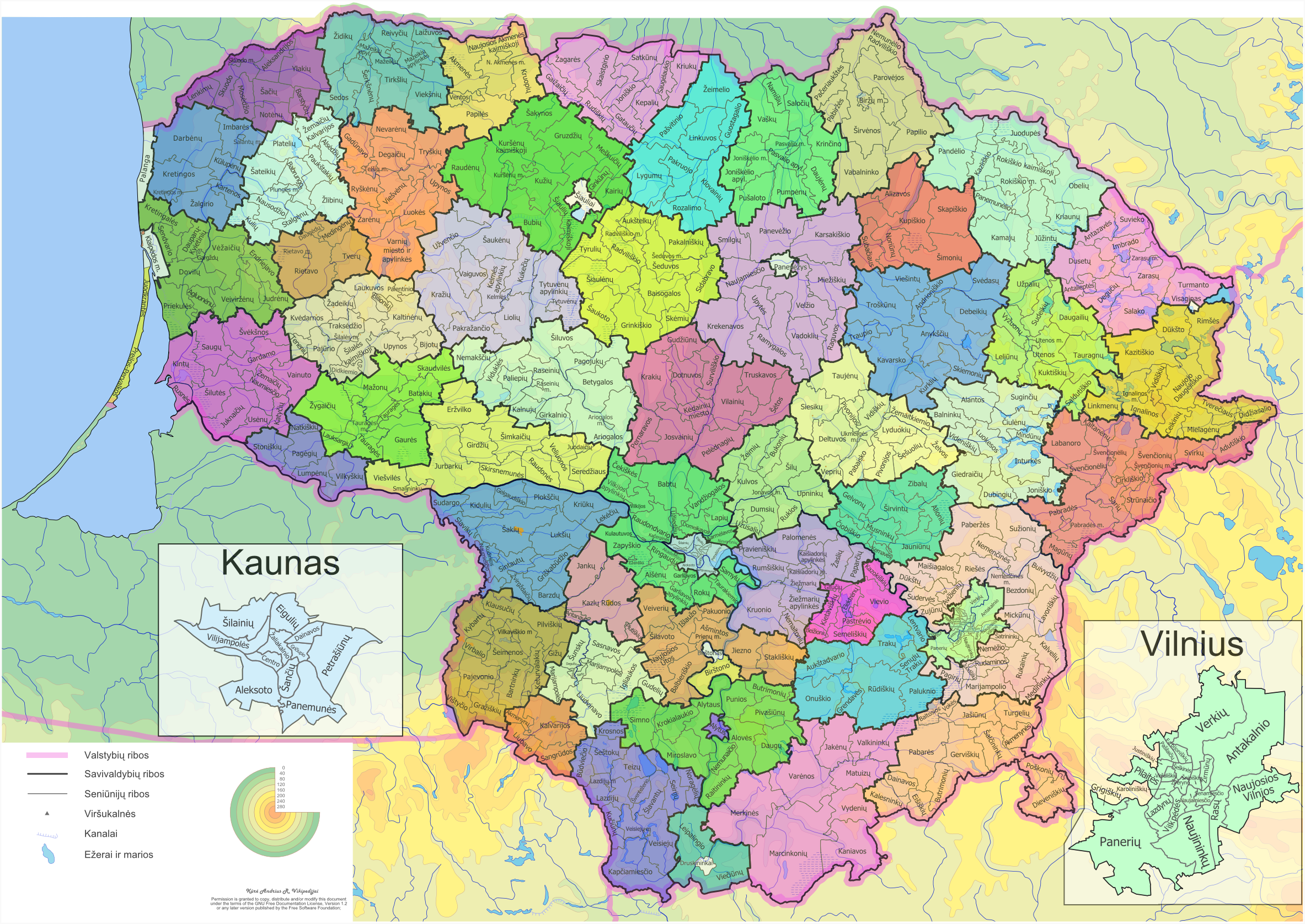
Detailed map of Lithuanian Elderships within Municipalities

Lithuanian Elderships by closest Major City

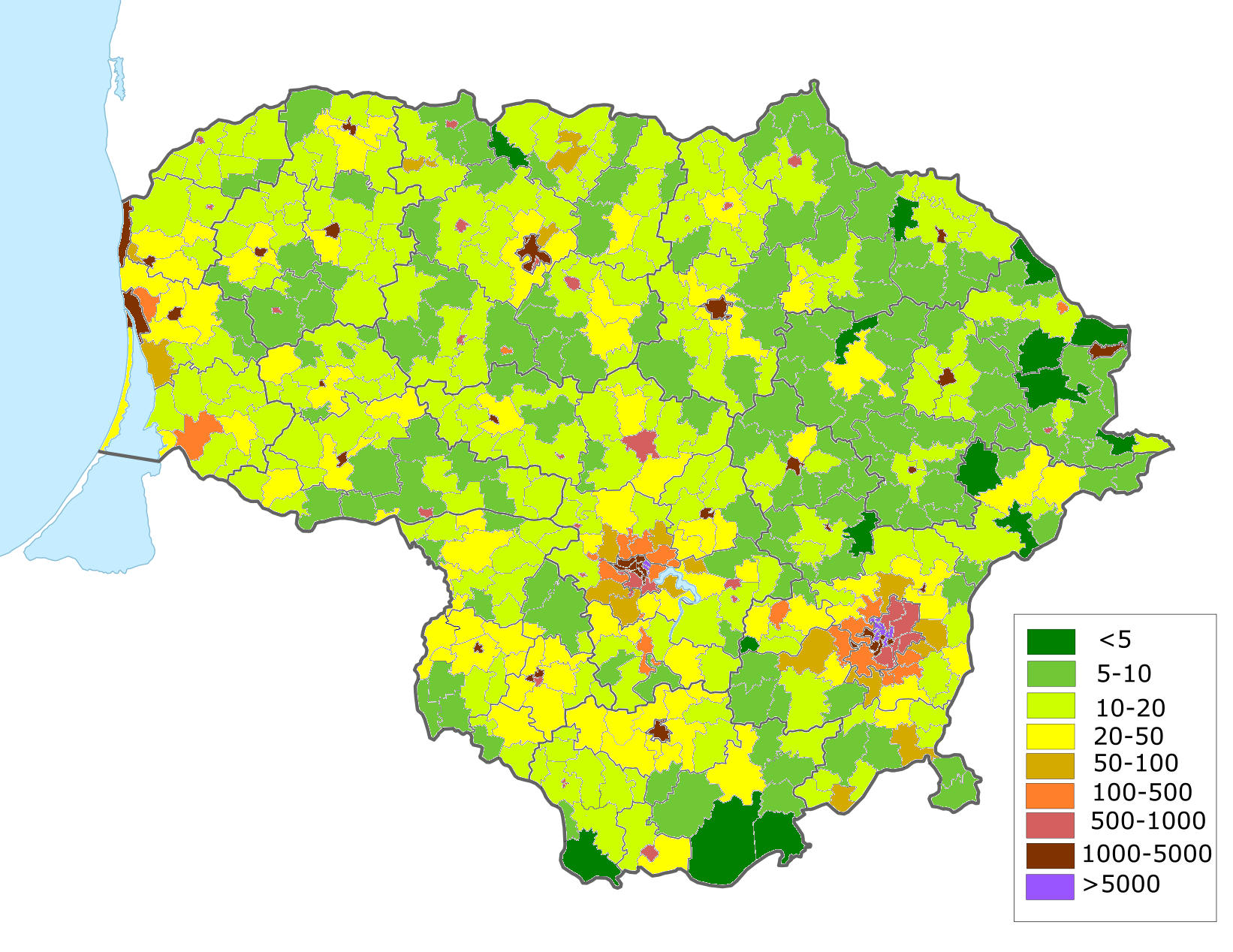
Elderships by population density per km^{2} (2021 census data)

An eldership (Lithuanian: seniūnija, plural: seniūnijos; also known in English as elderate, ward, or subdistrict) is the smallest administrative division of Lithuania. An eldership may comprise a very small region consisting of few villages, one single town, or a part of a big city. Elderships vary in size and population depending on their location and nature. A few elderships make up a municipality. Šilainiai, Dainava, Verkiai, Žirmūnai, and Pašilaičiai are the most populous elderates, with population counts over 40,000, around twice the population of some entire municipalities.

Elderships manage small-scale local matters, such as repairing pavements and dirt roads, and keep records on all families living in the eldership. The premise of the concept is that — unlike in higher administrative divisions — an elder (the leader of the eldership) could have time to talk to every person in the eldership who wants to.

Modern Lithuania is divided into 10 counties, 60 municipalities, and 546 elderships. Elderships function as municipal districts. In cities, an elder is elected to each eldership district, along with a mayor for the city.

In the Grand Duchy of Lithuania, the term referred to significantly larger administrative units, such as the Eldership of Samogitia, the name of the Duchy of Samogitia during 1422–1441.

== List ==
Eldership	Municipality	Population (2021)	Area (km^{2})	Density (per km^{2})
Adutiškis Eldership	Švenčionys District Municipality	795	125	6.36
Agluonėnai Eldership	Klaipėda District Municipality	1001	57	17.56
Akademija Eldership	Kaunas District Municipality	2928	4.64	631.03
Akmenė Eldership	Akmenė District Municipality	3562	190.55	18.69
Akmenynė Eldership	Šalčininkai District Municipality	652	54	12.07
Akmenynai Eldership	Kalvarija Municipality	545	46.5	11.72
Alanta Eldership	Molėtai District Municipality	1419	154	9.21
Aleksandrija Eldership	Skuodas District Municipality	1164	99	11.76
Aleksotas Eldership	Kaunas City Municipality	21390	24	891.25
Alioniai Eldership	Širvintos District Municipality	706	150	4.71
Alizava Eldership	Kupiškis District Municipality	1376	158	8.71
Alytus Area Eldership	Alytus District Municipality	4874	113	43.13
Alovė Eldership	Alytus District Municipality	3112	142	21.92
Alsėdžiai Eldership	Plungė District Municipality	1043	55.8	18.69
Alšėnai Eldership	Kaunas District Municipality	3957	57	69.42
Andrioniškis Eldership	Anykščiai District Municipality	413	92.6	4.46
Anykščiai Eldership	Anykščiai District Municipality	11993	271.06	44.24
Antakalnis Eldership	Vilnius City Municipality	39257	77.2	508.51
Antalieptė Eldership	Zarasai District Municipality	537	67	8.01
Antanavas Eldership	Kazlų Rūda Municipality	693	19	36.47
Antazavė Eldership	Zarasai District Municipality	778	100.43	7.75
Ariogala (city) Eldership	Raseiniai District Municipality	2743	4.82	569.09
Ariogala Eldership	Raseiniai District Municipality	2710	235	11.53
Aukštadvaris Eldership	Trakai District Municipality	1963	213	9.22
Aukštelkiai Eldership	Radviliškis District Municipality	1366	98.7	13.84
Avižieniai Eldership	Vilnius District Municipality	10867	45	241.49
Babrungas Eldership	Plungė District Municipality	2123	100.5	21.12
Babtai Eldership	Kaunas District Municipality	3851	143	26.93
Baisogala Eldership	Radviliškis District Municipality	3305	131	25.23
Balbieriškis Eldership	Prienai District Municipality	2390	153.26	15.59
Balninkai Eldership	Molėtai District Municipality	735	105.86	6.94
Baltoji Vokė Eldership	Šalčininkai District Municipality	1703	89.8	18.96
Barstyčiai Eldership	Skuodas District Municipality	675	75	9.00
Bartninkai Eldership	Vilkaviškis District Municipality	1871	128.46	14.56
Barzdai Eldership	Šakiai District Municipality	804	71	11.32
Batakiai Eldership	Tauragė District Municipality	1153	102.5	11.25
Batniava Eldership	Kaunas District Municipality	1168	42.8	27.29
Beižionys Eldership	Elektrėnai Municipality	240	51.4	4.67
Betygala Eldership	Raseiniai District Municipality	1652	184	8.98
Bezdonys Eldership	Vilnius District Municipality	2790	118.8	23.48
Bijotai Eldership	Šilalė District Municipality	800	54.1	14.79
Bilionys Eldership	Šilalė District Municipality	341	37	9.22
Birštonas Eldership	Birštonas Municipality	1056	111	9.51
Biržai (city) Eldership	Biržai District Municipality	10734	15.55	690.29
Bubiai Eldership	Šiauliai District Municipality	3098	225	13.77
Buivydžiai Eldership	Vilnius District Municipality	816	98.4	8.29
Bukonys Eldership	Jonava District Municipality	1194	108	11.06
Butrimonys Eldership	Alytus District Municipality	1625	78	20.83
Butrimonys Eldership	Šalčininkai District Municipality	1483	92	16.12
Būdvietis Eldership	Lazdijai District Municipality	883	61	14.48
Ceikiniai Eldership	Ignalina District Municipality	441	83	5.31
Centras Eldership	Kaunas City Municipality	14356	4.58	3,134.50
Cirkliškis Eldership	Švenčionys District Municipality	755	47	16.06
Čekiškė Eldership	Kaunas District Municipality	1417	82.6	17.15
Čiobiškis Eldership	Širvintos District Municipality	647	66.3	9.76
Čiulėnai Eldership	Molėtai District Municipality	1199	104	11.53
Dainava Eldership	Kaunas City Municipality	53053	5.28	10,047.92
Dainava Eldership	Šalčininkai District Municipality	680	55	12.36
Darbėnai Eldership	Kretinga District Municipality	3863	327	11.81
Daugailiai Eldership	Utena District Municipality	1139	135.4	8.41
Daugėdai Eldership	Rietavas Municipality	327	20.3	16.11
Daugai Eldership	Alytus District Municipality	2725	147	18.54
Daujėnai Eldership	Pasvalys District Municipality	999	97	10.30
Dauparai-Kvietiniai Eldership	Klaipėda District Municipality	2797	92	30.40
Debeikiai Eldership	Anykščiai District Municipality	1458	172.46	8.45
Degaičiai Eldership	Telšiai District Municipality	1759	112	15.71
Degučiai Eldership	Marijampolė Municipality	16209	5.94	2,728.79
Degučiai Eldership	Zarasai District Municipality	677	108.49	6.24
Deltuva Eldership	Ukmergė District Municipality	2374	170.9	13.89
Didkiemis Eldership	Šilalė District Municipality	233	38.4	6.07
Didžiasalis Eldership	Ignalina District Municipality	1222	82.2	14.87
Dieveniškės Eldership	Šalčininkai District Municipality	1585	207	7.66
Domeikava Eldership	Kaunas District Municipality	9134	57.8	158.03
Dotnuva Eldership	Kėdainiai District Municipality	4006	132	30.35
Doviliai Eldership	Klaipėda District Municipality	5250	121.7	43.14
Dubingiai Eldership	Molėtai District Municipality	733	99	7.40
Dusetos Eldership	Zarasai District Municipality	2091	139.4	15.00
Dūkštas Eldership	Ignalina District Municipality	1291	154	8.38
Dūkštos Eldership	Vilnius District Municipality	1808	91	19.87
Eiguliai Eldership	Kaunas City Municipality	39371	14.5	2,715.24
Eišiškės Eldership	Šalčininkai District Municipality	3805	63	60.40
Elektrėnai Eldership	Elektrėnai Municipality	12243	39.66	308.70
Endriejavas Eldership	Klaipėda District Municipality	1372	145	9.46
Eržvilkas Eldership	Jurbarkas District Municipality	1923	222.2	8.65
Ežerėlis Eldership	Kaunas District Municipality	1640	2.26	725.66
Fabijoniškės Eldership	Vilnius City Municipality	37006	5.87	6,304.26
Gadūnavas Eldership	Telšiai District Municipality	1473	138.9	10.60
Gaižaičiai Eldership	Joniškis District Municipality	352	121.9	2.89
Gardamas Eldership	Šilutė District Municipality	1519	134	11.34
Gargždai Eldership	Klaipeda District Municipality	15065	11.02	1,367.06
Garliava Area Eldership	Kaunas District Municipality	7751	84.3	91.95
Garliava Eldership	Kaunas District Municipality	10366	3.65	2,840.00
Gataučiai Eldership	Joniškis District Municipality	1261	109	11.57
Gaurė Eldership	Tauragė District Municipality	1959	243.8	8.04
Gelgaudiškis Eldership	Šakiai District Municipality	2417	72	33.57
Gelvonai Eldership	Širvintos District Municipality	1035	113	9.16
Gerviškės Eldership	Šalčininkai District Municipality	1790	184	9.73
Giedraičiai Eldership	Molėtai District Municipality	1648	175	9.42
Gilučiai Eldership	Elektrėnai Municipality	462	24.8	18.63
Ginkūnai Eldership	Šiauliai District Municipality	3294	37	89.03
Girdžiai Eldership	Jurbarkas District Municipality	927	89	10.42
Girkalnis Eldership	Raseiniai District Municipality	1381	105	13.15
Gižai Eldership	Vilkaviškis District Municipality	854	38.92	21.94
Gražiškiai Eldership	Vilkaviškis District Municipality	703	120	5.86
Grendavė Eldership	Trakai District Municipality	504	67	7.52
Gričiupis Eldership	Kaunas City Municipality	23894	3.81	6,271.39
Grigiškės Eldership	Vilnius City Municipality	10335	7.1	1,455.63
Grinkiškis Eldership	Radviliškis District Municipality	1818	196	9.28
Griškabūdis Eldership	Šakiai District Municipality	2030	145	14.00
Gruzdžiai Eldership	Šiauliai District Municipality	1935	176	10.99
Gudeliai Eldership	Marijampolė Municipality	726	56.4	12.87
Gudžiūnai Eldership	Kedainiai District Municipality	1292	93.5	13.82
Guostagalis Eldership	Pakruojis District Municipality	1038	105	9.89
Igliauka Eldership	Marijampolė Municipality	1831	96.5	18.97
Ignalina (city) Eldership	Ignalina District Municipality	5106	6.9	740.00
Ignalina Eldership	Ignalina District Municipality	1380	262	5.27
Imbarė Eldership	Kretinga District Municipality	1689	149.2	11.32
Imbradas Eldership	Zarasai District Municipality	794	120	6.62
Inturkė Eldership	Molėtai District Municipality	1096	129	8.50
Išlaužas Eldership	Prienai District Municipality	1566	65.57	23.88
Ylakiai Eldership	Skuodas District Municipality	2308	216	10.69
Jakėnai Eldership	Varėna District Municipality	957	149.2	6.41
Jankai Eldership	Kazlų Rūda Municipality	904	169.4	5.34
Jašiūnai Eldership	Šalčininkai District Municipality	3545	108.1	32.79
Jauniūnai Eldership	Širvintos District Municipality	1626	164.3	9.90
Jieznas Eldership	Prienai District Municipality	2484	112	22.18
Jonava (city) Eldership	Jonava District Municipality	27381	10.6	2,583.11
Joniškėlis Area Eldership	Pasvalys District Municipality	2080	192.4	10.81
Joniškėlis (city) Eldership	Pasvalys District Municipality	1026	2.36	434.75
Joniškis Eldership	Joniškis District Municipality	10011	106.8	93.74
Joniškis Eldership	Molėtai District Municipality	978	130	7.52
Josvainiai Eldership	Kėdainiai District Municipality	2669	185	14.43
Judrėnai Eldership	Klaipėda District Municipality	588	64	9.19
Juknaičiai Eldership	Šilutė District Municipality	2178	159.7	13.64
Juodaičiai Eldership	Jurbarkas District Municipality	322	31	10.39
Juodšiliai Eldership	Vilnius District Municipality	4479	19.04	235.24
Juodupė Eldership	Rokiškis District Municipality	2735	192	14.24
Jurbarkas City Eldership	Jurbarkas District Municipality	10186	14.3	712.31
Jurbarkai Eldership	Jurbarkas District Municipality	2582	265.8	9.71
Justiniškės Eldership	Vilnius City Municipality	25956	2.98	8,710.07
Jūžintai Eldership	Rokiškis District Municipality	1304	190	6.86
Kačerginė Eldership	Kaunas District Municipality	739	1.47	502.72
Kairiai Eldership	Šiauliai District Municipality	3021	92	32.84
Kaišiadorys Area Eldership	Kaišiadorys District Municipality	1890	58.6	32.25
Kaišiadorys (city) Eldership	Kaišiadorys District Municipality	8380	11	761.82
Kalesninkai Eldership	Šalčininkai District Municipality	1638	104	15.75
Kalnujai Eldership	Raseiniai District Municipality	836	73	11.45
Kaltanėnai Eldership	Švenčionys District Municipality	349	68	5.13
Kaltinėnai Eldership	Šilalė District Municipality	1928	160	12.05
Kalvarija Eldership	Kalvarija Municipality	7781	216.11	36.00
Kalveliai Eldership	Vilnius District Municipality	3950	118.9	33.22
Kamajai Eldership	Rokiškis District Municipality	1668	200.59	8.32
Kaniava Eldership	Varėna District Municipality	1009	262.7	3.84
Kapčiamiestis Eldership	Lazdijai District Municipality	832	230	3.62
Karmėlava Eldership	Kaunas District Municipality	6265	43.8	143.04
Karoliniškės Eldership	Vilnius City Municipality	24751	4	6,187.75
Karsakiškis Eldership	Panevėžys District Municipality	2473	305.6	8.09
Kartena Eldership	Kretinga District Municipality	1433	85.4	16.78
Katyčiai Eldership	Šilutė District Municipality	814	63.05	12.91
Kavarskas Eldership	Anykščiai District Municipality	2361	256	9.22
Kazitiškis Eldership	Ignalina District Municipality	763	162	4.71
Kazliškis Eldership	Rokiškis District Municipality	517	123	4.20
Kazlų Rūda Eldership	Kazlų Rūda Municipality	3282	360	9.12
Kazokiškės Eldership	Elektrėnai Municipality	391	62	6.31
Kelmė Area Eldership	Kelmė District Municipality	2022	133.7	15.12
Kelmė Eldership	Kelmė District Municipality	7688	7.85	979.36
Kepaliai Eldership	Joniškis District Municipality	1416	91.3	15.51
Kernavė Eldership	Širvintos District Municipality	399	40.7	9.80
Keturvalakiai Eldership	Vilkaviškis District Municipality	1354	84.4	16.04
Kėdainiai Eldership	Kėdainiai District Municipality	24547	44	557.89
Kiduliai Eldership	Šakiai District Municipality	1809	124.05	14.58
Kietaviškės Eldership	Elektrėnai Municipality	1257	55.6	22.61
Kintai Eldership	Šilutė District Municipality	1442	95	15.18
Kybartai Eldership	Vilkaviškis District Municipality	6026	154	39.13
Klausučiai Eldership	Vilkaviškis District Municipality	2354	117	20.12
Klovainiai Eldership	Pakruojis District Municipality	2122	174	12.20
Krakės Eldership	Kėdainiai District Municipality	2314	173	13.38
Kražiai Eldership	Kelmė District Municipality	2050	255	8.04
Krekenava Eldership	Panevėžys District Municipality	3526	368.9	9.56
Kretingalė Eldership	Klaipėda District Municipality	5005	110	45.50
Kretinga (city) Eldership	Kretinga District Municipality	17249	15.6	1,105.71
Kretinga Area Eldership	Kretinga District Municipality	4849	144.7	33.51
Kriauniai Eldership	Rokiškis District Municipality	752	105	7.16
Krinčinis Eldership	Pasvalys District Municipality	1591	122	13.04
Kriukai Eldership	Joniškis District Municipality	1088	134	8.12
Kriūkai Eldership	Šakiai District Municipality	1457	97	15.02
Krokialaukis Eldership	Alytus District Municipality	1788	89	20.09
Krosna Eldership	Lazdijai District Municipality	692	42	16.48
Kruonis Eldership	Kaišiadorys District Municipality	2295	223.5	10.27
Kruopiai Eldership	Akmenė District Municipality	786	129.41	6.07
Kučiūnai Eldership	Lazdijai District Municipality	639	66	9.68
Kudirkos Naumiestis Eldership	Šakiai District Municipality	2167	76	28.51
Kukečių Eldership	Kelmė District Municipality	1322	120	11.02
Kuktiškiai Eldership	Utena District Municipality	681	62.3	10.93
Kulautuva Eldership	Kaunas District Municipality	1393	2.82	493.97
Kuliai Eldership	Plungė District Municipality	962	128.5	7.49
Kulva Eldership	Jonava District Municipality	1863	112.9	16.50
Kupiškis Eldership	Kupiškis District Municipality	3025	250	12.10
Kurkliai Eldership	Anykščiai District Municipality	1015	146.47	6.93
Kuršėnai Area Eldership	Šiauliai District Municipality	3466	341	10.16
Kuršėnai (city) Eldership	Šiauliai District Municipality	10916	11.92	915.77
Kužiai Eldership	Šiauliai District Municipality	3330	191	17.43
Kūlupėnai Eldership	Kretinga District Municipality	1407	69	20.39
Kvėdarna Eldership	Šilalė District Municipality	2898	144.1	20.11
Labanoras Eldership	Švenčionys District Municipality	290	205	1.41
Laižuva Eldership	Mažeikiai District Municipality	800	58	13.79
Lapės Eldership	Kaunas District Municipality	3547	56.7	62.56
Lauksargiai Eldership	Tauragė District Municipality	1054	63.9	16.49
Laukuva Eldership	Šilalė District Municipality	2497	167	14.95
Lavoriškės Eldership	Vilnius District Municipality	2070	122.8	16.86
Lazdijų (city) Eldership	Lazdijai District Municipality	4016	4.8	836.67
Lazdijai Area Eldership	Lazdijai District Municipality	2413	170	14.19
Lazdynai Eldership	Vilnius City Municipality	30945	9.9	3,125.76
Leipalingis Eldership	Druskininkai Municipality	3143	258.54	12.16
Lekėčiai Eldership	Šakiai District Municipality	1316	79	16.66
Leliūnai Eldership	Utena District Municipality	2695	153	17.61
Lenkimai Eldership	Skuodas District Municipality	742	74	10.03
Lentvaris Eldership	Trakai District Municipality	12812	49.2	260.41
Linkmenys Eldership	Ignalina District Municipality	763	96	7.95
Lioliai Eldership	Kelmė District Municipality	1947	155	12.56
Linksmakalnis	Kaunas District Municipality	634	2.94	215.65
Linkuva Eldership	Pakruojis District Municipality	2688	168	16.00
Liubavas Eldership	Kalvarija Municipality	576	58.6	9.83
Liudvinavas Eldership	Marijampolė Municipality	4734	168	28.18
Lyduokiai Eldership	Ukmergė District Municipality	908	75.7	11.99
Lygumai Eldership	Pakruojis District Municipality	1885	214	8.81
Lukšiai Eldership	Šakiai District Municipality	2076	162	12.81
Lumpėnai Eldership	Pagėgiai Municipality	843	62	13.60
Luokesa Eldership	Molėtai District Municipality	1208	101	11.96
Luokė Eldership	Telšiai District Municipality	1392	132	10.55
Magūnai Eldership	Švenčionys District Municipality	603	101	5.97
Maišiagala Eldership	Vilnius District Municipality	2822	100.8	28.00
Marcinkonys Eldership	Varėna District Municipality	1021	565	1.81
Marijampolė Eldership	Marijampolė Municipality	5461	187	29.20
Marijampolis Eldership	Vilnius District Municipality	3481	124.7	27.91
Matuizos Eldership	Varėna District Municipality	1833	148	12.39
Mažeikiai Area Eldership	Mažeikiai District Municipality	3340	101	33.07
Mažeikiai Eldership	Mažeikiai District Municipality	33101	13.95	2,372.83
Mažonys Eldership	Tauragė District Municipality	2732	220.7	12.38
Medelynas Eldership	Šiauliai City Municipality	5004	3.7	1,352.43
Medingėnai Eldership	Rietavas Municipality	432	60.7	7.12
Medininkai Eldership	Vilnius District Municipality	953	62.9	15.15
Merkinė Eldership	Varėna District Municipality	2552	390.3	6.54
Meškuičiai Eldership	Šiauliai District Municipality	1781	141	12.63
Mickūnai Eldership	Vilnius District Municipality	5409	82	65.96
Mielagėnai Eldership	Ignalina District Municipality	639	115	5.56
Miežiškiai Eldership	Panevėžys District Municipality	2008	209	9.61
Mindūnai Eldership	Molėtai District Municipality	463	65.65	7.05
Miroslavas Eldership	Alytus District Municipality	2798	135	20.73
Mokolai Eldership	Marijampolė Municipality	10109	7.05	1,433.90
Mosėdis Eldership	Skuodas District Municipality	1900	97	19.59
Musninkai Eldership	Širvintos District Municipality	977	59.3	16.48
Namišiai Eldership	Pasvalys District Municipality	739	64.5	11.46
Nartas Eldership	Marijampolė Municipality	10409	11.09	938.59
Natkiškiai Eldership	Pagėgiai Municipality	654	52	12.58
Naujamiestis Eldership (Panevėžys)	Panevėžys District Municipality	2320	136.7	16.97
Naujamiestis Eldership	Vilnius City Municipality	28157	4.8	5,866.04
Naujininkai Eldership	Vilnius City Municipality	30030	41.1	730.66
Naujasis Daugėliškis Eldership	Ignalina District Municipality	1072	160	6.70
Naujoji Akmenė Area Eldership	Akmenė District Municipality	1803	240	7.51
Naujoji Akmenės (city) Eldership	Akmenė District Municipality	7985	10.74	743.48
Naujoji Ūta Eldership	Prienai District Municipality	785	81	9.69
Naujoji Vilnia Eldership	Vilnius City Municipality	36507	38.6	945.78
Nausodis Eldership	Plungė District Municipality	3695	81.5	45.34
Nemaitonys Eldership	Kaišiadorys District Municipality	365	57.8	6.31
Nemakščiai Eldership	Raseiniai District Municipality	1520	114.3	13.30
Nemenčinė (city) Eldership	Vilnius District Municipality	4831	3.95	1,223.04
Nemenčinė Eldership	Vilnius District Municipality	3565	152.51	23.38
Nemėžis Eldership	Vilnius District Municipality	8950	39.6	226.01
Nemunaitis Eldership	Alytus District Municipality	981	42	23.36
Nemunėlis Radviliškio Eldership	Biržai District Municipality	1238	196.26	6.31
Nevarėnai Eldership	Telšiai District Municipality	1251	132	9.48
Neveronys Eldership	Kaunas District Municipality	3094	13	238.00
Noragėliai Eldership	Lazdijai District Municipality	776	60	12.93
Noriūnai Eldership	Kupiškis District Municipality	1712	91	18.81
Notėnai Eldership	Skuodas District Municipality	763	91	8.38
Obeliai Eldership	Rokiškis District Municipality	2435	240	10.15
Onuškis Eldership	Trakai District Municipality	1438	250	5.75
Pabaiskas Eldership	Ukmergė District Municipality	927	98.15	9.44
Pabarė Eldership	Šalčininkai District Municipality	1119	115	9.73
Paberžė Eldership	Vilnius District Municipality	3175	209	15.19
Pabiržė Eldership	Biržai District Municipality	1442	84.11	17.14
Pabradė Eldership	Švenčionys District Municipality	6257	365	17.14
Pačeriaukštė Eldership	Biržai District Municipality	1130	123.13	9.18
Pagėgiai Eldership	Pagėgiai Municipality	3196	140	22.83
Pagiriai Eldership	Vilnius District Municipality	7147	87.2	81.96
Pagojukai Eldership	Raseiniai District Municipality	1215	109	11.15
Paįstrys Eldership	Panevėžys District Municipality	2388	163.8	14.58
Pajevonys Eldership	Vilkaviškis District Municipality	1104	120.9	9.13
Pajūris Eldership	Šilalė District Municipality	1758	116.5	15.09
Pakalniškiai Eldership	Radviliškis District Municipality	1981	166	11.93
Pakražantis Eldership	Kelmė District Municipality	1643	160	10.27
Pakruojis Eldership	Pakruojis District Municipality	6450	142	45.42
Pakuonis Eldership	Prienai District Municipality	1508	99.4	15.17
Palentinis Eldership	Šilalė District Municipality	230	32.4	7.10
Paliepiai Eldership	Raseiniai District Municipality	1518	92	16.50
Palomenė Eldership	Kaišiadorys District Municipality	1606	203.2	7.90
Paluknys Eldership	Trakai District Municipality	1184	140	8.46
Pandėlys Eldership	Rokiškis District Municipality	2321	324.39	7.15
Panemunėlis Eldership	Rokiškis District Municipality	1088	141	7.72
Panemunė Eldership	Kaunas City Municipality	14888	24.8	600.32
Paneriai Eldership	Vilnius City Municipality	8807	84.8	103.86
Panevėžys Area Eldership	Panevėžys District Municipality	7583	169.5	44.74
Paparčiai Eldership	Kaišiadorys District Municipality	573	60	9.55
Papilė Eldership	Akmenė District Municipality	2475	238	10.40
Papilys Eldership	Biržai District Municipality	1439	256.41	5.61
Parovėja Eldership	Biržai District Municipality	1607	174	9.24
Pastrėvys Eldership	Elektrėnai Municipality	641	56	11.45
Pasvalys Area Eldership	Pasvalys District Municipality	2779	132.5	20.97
Pasvalys (city) Eldership	Pasvalys District Municipality	6451	7.22	893.49
Pašilaičiai Eldership	Vilnius City Municipality	40384	7.9	5,111.90
Pašvitinis Eldership	Pakruojis District Municipality	1260	157	8.03
Paukštakiai Eldership	Plungė District Municipality	1034	96.8	10.68
Pelėdnagiai Eldership	Kėdainiai District Municipality	3467	141.6	24.48
Pernarava Eldership	Kėdainiai District Municipality	1093	114.7	9.53
Petrašiūnai Eldership	Kaunas City Municipality	12835	28.5	450.35
Pilaitė Eldership	Vilnius City Municipality	28234	13.9	2,031.22
Pilviškiai Eldership	Vilkaviškis District Municipality	3775	159	23.74
Pivašiūnai Eldership	Alytus District Municipality	1420	108	13.15
Pivonija Eldership	Ukmergė District Municipality	1160	163.4	7.10
Plateliai Eldership	Plungė District Municipality	1583	136.5	11.60
Plokščiai Eldership	Šakiai District Municipality	776	98	7.92
Plungė (city) Eldership	Plungė District Municipality	17543	11.8	1,486.69
Plutiškės Eldership	Kazlų Rūda Municipality	585	30.2	19.37
Poškonys Eldership	Šalčininkai District Municipality	566	85	6.66
Pravieniškės Eldership	Kaišiadorys District Municipality	3233	42.1	76.79
Priekulė Eldership	Klaipėda District Municipality	8473	161.77	52.38
Prienai Eldership	Prienai District Municipality	9690	81.12	119.45
Pumpėnai Eldership	Pasvalys District Municipality	1991	176.7	11.27
Punia Eldership	Alytus District Municipality	2362	78	30.28
Pušalotas Eldership	Pasvalys District Municipality	1348	141.8	9.51
Radviliškis (city) Eldership	Radviliškis District Municipality	15103	17.32	872.00
Radviliškis Area Eldership	Radviliškis District Municipality	2511	145	17.32
Raguva Eldership	Panevėžys District Municipality	1243	94.7	13.13
Raitininkai Eldership	Alytus District Municipality	748	103	7.26
Ramygala Eldership	Panevėžys District Municipality	2871	237.2	12.10
Raseiniai (city) Eldership	Raseiniai District Municipality	9865	8.48	1,163.33
Raseiniai Eldership	Raseiniai District Municipality	2879	137	21.01
Rasos Eldership	Vilnius City Municipality	10230	16.3	627.61
Raudėnai Eldership	Šiauliai District Municipality	1020	203	5.02
Raudondvaris Eldership	Kaunas District Municipality	5642	105	53.73
Raudonė Eldership	Jurbarkas District Municipality	1027	109.7	9.36
Reivyčiai Eldership	Mažeikiai District Municipality	1674	98	17.08
Rėkyva Eldership	Šiauliai City Municipality	5240	9.7	540.21
Riešė Eldership	Vilnius District Municipality	6386	102.2	62.49
Rietavas (city) Eldership	Rietavas Municipality	3234	3.45	937.39
Rietavas Area Eldership	Rietavas Municipality	2317	315.5	7.34
Rimšė Eldership	Ignalina District Municipality	624	98	6.37
Ringaudai Eldership	Kaunas District Municipality	7892	50	157.84
Ryškėnai Eldership	Telšiai District Municipality	2201	107	20.57
Rokiškis Area Eldership	Rokiškis District Municipality	4125	285.31	14.46
Rokiškis City Eldership	Rokiškis District Municipality	11770	11.36	1,036.09
Rokai Eldership	Kaunas District Municipality	894	41.6	21.49
Rozalimas Eldership	Pakruojis District Municipality	1752	152	11.53
Rudamina Eldership	Vilnius District Municipality	5769	47	122.74
Rudiškiai Eldership	Joniškis District Municipality	583	59.2	9.85
Rukainiai Eldership	Vilnius District Municipality	2385	143.6	16.61
Rukla Eldership	Jonava District Municipality	2210	72.3	30.57
Rumšiškės Eldership	Kaišiadorys District Municipality	3806	122	31.20
Rusnė Eldership	Šilutė District Municipality	1357	56	24.23
Rūdiškės Eldership	Trakai District Municipality	3308	250	13.23
Salakas Eldership	Zarasai District Municipality	782	172.8	4.53
Salantai (city) Eldership	Kretinga District Municipality	1272	3.2	397.50
Saldutiškis Eldership	Utena District Municipality	703	114.6	6.13
Saločiai Eldership	Pasvalys District Municipality	2181	160.3	13.61
Samylai Eldership	Kaunas District Municipality	4452	76.2	58.43
Sangrūda Eldership	Kalvarija Municipality	1191	92.6	12.86
Sariai Eldership	Švenčionys District Municipality	359	144	2.49
Sasnava Eldership	Marijampolė Municipality	2925	132.07	22.15
Satkūnai Eldership	Joniškis District Municipality	1043	100.15	10.41
Saugėlaukis Eldership	Joniškis District Municipality	1104	70.66	15.62
Saugos Eldership	Šilutė District Municipality	2758	160	17.24
Seda Eldership	Mažeikiai District Municipality	2261	170	13.30
Seirijai Eldership	Lazdijai District Municipality	2024	175.7	11.52
Semeliškės Eldership	Elektrėnai Municipality	1024	66.7	15.35
Senamiestis Eldership	Vilnius City Municipality	21782	4.5	4,840.44
Sendvaris Eldership	Klaipėda District Municipality	10969	71.93	152.50
Senieji Trakai Eldership	Trakai District Municipality	2633	98.3	26.79
Seredžius Eldership	Jurbarkas District Municipality	1906	136.64	13.95
Sidabravas Eldership	Radviliškis District Municipality	1342	144	9.32
Siesikai Eldership	Ukmergė District Municipality	1231	168	7.33
Simnas Eldership	Alytus District Municipality	3148	131	24.03
Sintautai Eldership	Šakiai District Municipality	1329	95	13.99
Skaistgiris Eldership	Joniškis District Municipality	1901	142.4	13.35
Skapiškis Eldership	Kupiškis District Municipality	1251	142	8.81
Skaudvilė Eldership	Tauragė District Municipality	3180	139.8	22.75
Skėmai Eldership	Radviliškis District Municipality	971	79	12.29
Skiemonys Eldership	Anykščiai District Municipality	880	142.48	6.18
Skirsnemunė Eldership	Jurbarkas District Municipality	1653	98	16.87
Skuodas (city) Eldership	Skuodas District Municipality	5508	5.96	924.16
Skuodas Area Eldership	Skuodas District Municipality	2320	158	14.68
Slavikai Eldership	Šakiai District Municipality	554	65	8.52
Smalininkai Eldership	Jurbarkas District Municipality	1052	22.3	47.17
Smilgiai Eldership	Panevėžys District Municipality	1423	130.7	10.89
Stakliškės Eldership	Prienai District Municipality	2046	170	12.04
Stalgėnai Eldership	Plungė District Municipality	836	82.5	10.13
Stoniškiai Eldership	Pagėgiai Municipality	1534	134	11.45
Strūnaitis Eldership	Švenčionys District Municipality	1002	106	9.45
Subačius Eldership	Kupiškis District Municipality	1657	83	19.96
Sudargas Eldership	Šakiai District Municipality	719	68.14	10.55
Sudeikiai Eldership	Utena District Municipality	1213	108	11.23
Sudervė Eldership	Vilnius District Municipality	2829	79.1	35.76
Suginčiai Eldership	Molėtai District Municipality	1407	220	6.40
Surviliškis Eldership	Kėdainiai District Municipality	1277	83	15.39
Suviekas Eldership	Zarasai District Municipality	527	124	4.25
Sužionys Eldership	Vilnius District Municipality	1621	160.1	10.12
Svėdasai Eldership	Anykščiai District Municipality	1761	185	9.52
Svirkos Eldership	Švenčionys District Municipality	707	101	7.00
Šatės Eldership	Skuodas District Municipality	870	81	10.74
Šakiai Eldership	Šakiai District Municipality	8990	240	37.46
Šakyna Eldership	Šiauliai District Municipality	1040	148	7.03
Šalčininkai Eldership	Šalčininkai District Municipality	9533	145.11	65.69
Šančiai Eldership	Kaunas District Municipality	18954	7.41	2,557.89
Šateikiai Eldership	Plungė District Municipality	2055	133.6	15.38
Šatrininkai Eldership	Vilnius District Municipality	2881	34.6	83.27
Šaukėnai Eldership	Kelmė District Municipality	1875	250	7.50
Šaukotas Eldership	Radviliškis District Municipality	797	151	5.28
Šeduva Eldership	Radviliškis District Municipality	3963	148	26.78
Šeimena Eldership	Vilkaviškis District Municipality	4766	164	29.06
Šerkšnėnai Eldership	Mažeikiai District Municipality	1561	133	11.74
Šeškinė Eldership	Vilnius City Municipality	28137	4.4	6,394.77
Šeštokai Eldership	Lazdijai District Municipality	1252	89	14.07
Šešuoliai Eldership	Ukmergė District Municipality	679	104.8	6.48
Šėta Eldership	Kėdainiai District Municipality	1628	130	12.52
Šiaulėnai Eldership	Radviliškis District Municipality	1166	199	5.86
Šiauliai Area Eldership	Šiauliai District Municipality	8016	242	33.12
Šilainiai Eldership	Kaunas City Municipality	55125	25.3	2,178.85
Šilalė Area Eldership	Šilalė District Municipality	2572	125	20.58
Šilalė (city) Eldership	Šilalė District Municipality	4729	3.48	1,358.91
Šilavotas Eldership	Prienai District Municipality	1440	79	18.23
Šilutė Eldership	Šilutė District Municipality	20866	150	139.11
Šiluva Eldership	Raseiniai District Municipality	1923	227	8.47
Šilai Eldership	Jonava District Municipality	1670	143	11.68
Šimkaičiai Eldership	Jurbarkas District Municipality	1561	236.5	6.60
Šimonys Eldership	Kupiškis District Municipality	1291	230	5.61
Širvėna Eldership	Biržai District Municipality	3431	263.43	13.02
Širvintos (city) Eldership	Širvintos District Municipality	5827	4.03	1,445.91
Širvintos Area Eldership	Širvintos District Municipality	2865	178.9	16.01
Šnipiškės Eldership	Vilnius City Municipality	16474	3.12	5,280.13
Šunskai Eldership	Marijampolė Municipality	2442	73	33.45
Šveicarija Eldership	Jonava District Municipality	2229	91.5	24.36
Švenčionėliai Eldership	Švenčionys District Municipality	6103	239	25.54
Švenčionys Eldership	Švenčionys District Municipality	5831	164	35.55
Šventežeris Eldership	Lazdijai District Municipality	1521	130.9	11.62
Švėkšna Eldership	Šilutė District Municipality	2690	180	14.94
Taujėnai Eldership	Ukmergė District Municipality	1222	233.8	5.23
Tauragė (city) Eldership	Tauragė District Municipality	21203	14.16	1,497.39
Tauragė Area Eldership	Tauragė District Municipality	4689	127.6	36.75
Tauragnai Eldership	Utena District Municipality	997	186	5.36
Taurakiemis Eldership	Kaunas District Municipality	1661	75	22.15
Telšiai (city) Eldership	Telšiai District Municipality	22642	16.4	1,380.61
Teneniai Eldership	Šilalė District Municipality	410	39.1	10.49
Tirkšliai Eldership	Mažeikiai District Municipality	3520	119	29.58
Tyruliai Eldership	Radviliškis District Municipality	610	84	7.26
Tytuvėnai Area Eldership	Kelmė District Municipality	2414	286.7	8.42
Tytuvėnai (city) Eldership	Kelmė District Municipality	1850	9.8	188.78
Traksėdis Eldership	Šilalė District Municipality	1540	84.2	18.29
Trakai Eldership	Trakai District Municipality	8200	141.5	57.95
Traupis Eldership	Anykščiai District Municipality	569	75	7.59
Tryškiai Eldership	Telšiai District Municipality	2154	193	11.16
Troškūnai Eldership	Anykščiai District Municipality	2214	291.53	7.59
Truskava Eldership	Kėdainiai District Municipality	969	130	7.45
Turgeliai Eldership	Šalčininkai District Municipality	1953	119	16.41
Turmantas Eldership	Zarasai District Municipality	957	209	4.58
Tverečius Eldership	Ignalina District Municipality	382	79	4.84
Tverai Eldership	Rietavas Municipality	1071	142	7.54
Ukmergė (city) Eldership	Ukmergė District Municipality	21258	20.45	1,039.51
Upyna Eldership (Šilalė)	Šilalė District Municipality	1449	105.6	13.72
Upyna Eldership (Telšiai)	Telšiai District Municipality	1456	109	13.36
Upytė Eldership	Panevėžys District Municipality	1301	115.3	11.28
Upninkai Eldership	Jonava District Municipality	1076	173.4	6.21
Usėnai Eldership	Šilutė District Municipality	999	77.9	12.82
Utena (city) Eldership	Utena District Municipality	25343	15.28	1,658.57
Utena Eldership	Utena District Municipality	1996	146	13.67
Užliedžiai Eldership	Kaunas District Municipality	6481	34.2	189.50
Užpaliai Eldership	Utena District Municipality	1439	176	8.18
Užusaliai Eldership	Jonava District Municipality	2198	81	27.14
Užventis Eldership	Kelmė District Municipality	2493	234	10.65
Vabalninkas Eldership	Biržai District Municipality	2293	247	9.28
Vadokliai Eldership	Panevėžys District Municipality	1529	168.3	9.08
Vaiguva Eldership	Kelmė District Municipality	722	91	7.93
Vainutas Eldership	Šilutė District Municipality	1728	180	9.60
Valkininkai Eldership	Varėna District Municipality	1572	156	10.08
Vandžiogala Eldership	Kaunas District Municipality	1335	126.3	10.57
Varėna Eldership	Varėna District Municipality	11084	350	31.67
Varniai Eldership	Telšiai District Municipality	2857	274	10.43
Vaškai Eldership	Pasvalys District Municipality	1963	188.8	10.40
Veisiejai Eldership	Lazdijai District Municipality	3199	252.6	12.66
Veiveriai Eldership	Prienai District Municipality	3377	100	33.77
Veiviržėnai Eldership	Klaipėda District Municipality	2458	188	13.07
Veliuonia Eldership	Jurbarkas District Municipality	1220	120	10.17
Velžys Eldership	Panevėžys District Municipality	6761	147.3	45.90
Venta Eldership	Akmenė District Municipality	2974	35.5	83.77
Vepriai Eldership	Ukmergė District Municipality	959	63.1	15.20
Verkiai Eldership	Vilnius City Municipality	50754	55.65	912.02
Vėžaičiai Eldership	Klaipėda District Municipality	3986	160.5	24.83
Videniškiai Eldership	Molėtai District Municipality	554	70	7.91
Vidiškiai Eldership (Ignalina)	Ignalina District Municipality	1009	62	16.27
Vidiškiai Eldership (Ukmergė)	Ukmergė District Municipality	2361	99.37	23.76
Viduklė Eldership	Raseiniai District Municipality	2950	174	16.95
Vydeniai Eldership	Varėna District Municipality	1109	140.3	7.90
Vydmantai Eldership	Kretinga District Municipality	2239	30.4	73.65
Viečiūnai Eldership	Druskininkai Municipality	3998	197.7	20.22
Viekšniai Eldership	Mažeikiai District Municipality	4029	211	19.09
Viešintai Eldership	Anykščiai District Municipality	657	111.62	5.89
Viešvėnai Eldership	Telšiai District Municipality	2191	116.55	18.80
Viešvilė Eldership	Jurbarkas District Municipality	815	125	6.52
Vievis Eldership	Elektrėnai Municipality	7118	152	46.83
Vilainiai Eldership	Kėdainiai District Municipality	3090	179	17.26
Vilijampolė Eldership	Kaunas City Municipality	23687	14.4	1,644.93
Vilkaviškis (city) Eldership	Vilkaviškis District Municipality	10286	7.53	1,366.00
Vilkija Area Eldership	Kaunas District Municipality	1968	149	13.21
Vilkija Eldership	Kaunas District Municipality	1762	2.69	655.02
Vilkyškiai Eldership	Pagėgiai Municipality	1213	157.22	7.72
Vilkpėdė Eldership	Vilnius City Municipality	19325	10.8	1,789.35
Virbalis Eldership	Vilkaviškis District Municipality	1449	46.6	31.09
Viršuliškės Eldership	Vilnius City Municipality	13877	2.5	5,550.80
Vištytis Eldership	Vilkaviškis District Municipality	826	93.6	8.82
Vyžuoniai Eldership	Utena District Municipality	1303	73	17.85
Zapyškis Eldership	Kaunas District Municipality	2429	149	16.30
Zarasai (city) Eldership	Zarasai District Municipality	6077	12.82	474.02
Zarasai Eldership	Zarasai District Municipality	1894	148.05	12.79
Zibalai Eldership	Širvintos District Municipality	941	138.8	6.78
Zujūnai Eldership	Vilnius District Municipality	7311	51	143.35
Žadeikiai Eldership	Šilalė District Municipality	666	69	9.65
Žagarė Eldership	Joniškis District Municipality	2525	181	13.95
Žalgiris Eldership	Kretinga District Municipality	3638	164.6	22.10
Žaliakalnis Eldership	Kaunas City Municipality	21200	7.35	2,884.35
Žarėnai Eldership	Telšiai District Municipality	834	100	8.34
Žasliai Eldership	Kaišiadorys District Municipality	1841	109	16.89
Žeimelis Eldership	Pakruojis District Municipality	1662	165.7	10.03
Žeimiai Eldership	Jonava District Municipality	1774	154.9	11.45
Želva Eldership	Ukmergė District Municipality	908	93.8	9.68
Žemaičių Kalvarija Eldership	Plungė District Municipality	1570	124.6	12.60
Žemaičių Naumiestis Eldership	Šilutė District Municipality	2716	89	30.52
Žemaitkiemis Eldership	Ukmergė District Municipality	566	80.6	7.02
Židikai Eldership	Mažeikiai District Municipality	1834	198	9.26
Žiežmariai Area Eldership	Kaišiadorys District Municipality	2688	140	19.20
Žiežmariai Eldership	Kaišiadorys District Municipality	3158	3.82	826.70
Žirmūnai Eldership	Vilnius City Municipality	43453	5.7	7,623.33
Žygaičiai Eldership	Tauragė District Municipality	2032	200	10.16
Žlibinai Eldership	Plungė District Municipality	1221	140.3	8.70
Žvėrynas Eldership	Vilnius City Municipality	12089	2.6	4,649.62
Žvirgždaičiai Eldership	Šakiai District Municipality	490	56	8.75

== See also ==
Terms

- Ward
- Parish
- Subdistrict
- Barangay

Lithuania

- Administrative divisions of Lithuania
- Counties (Lithuanian: plural – apskritys, singular – apskritis)
- Municipalities (Lithuanian: plural – savivaldybės, singular – savivaldybė)
- Seniūnaitija (sub-eldership)
- Cities (Lithuanian: plural – miestai, singular – miestas)
- Towns (Lithuanian: plural – miesteliai, singular – miestelis)
