= Velžys Eldership =

Eldership of Lithuania

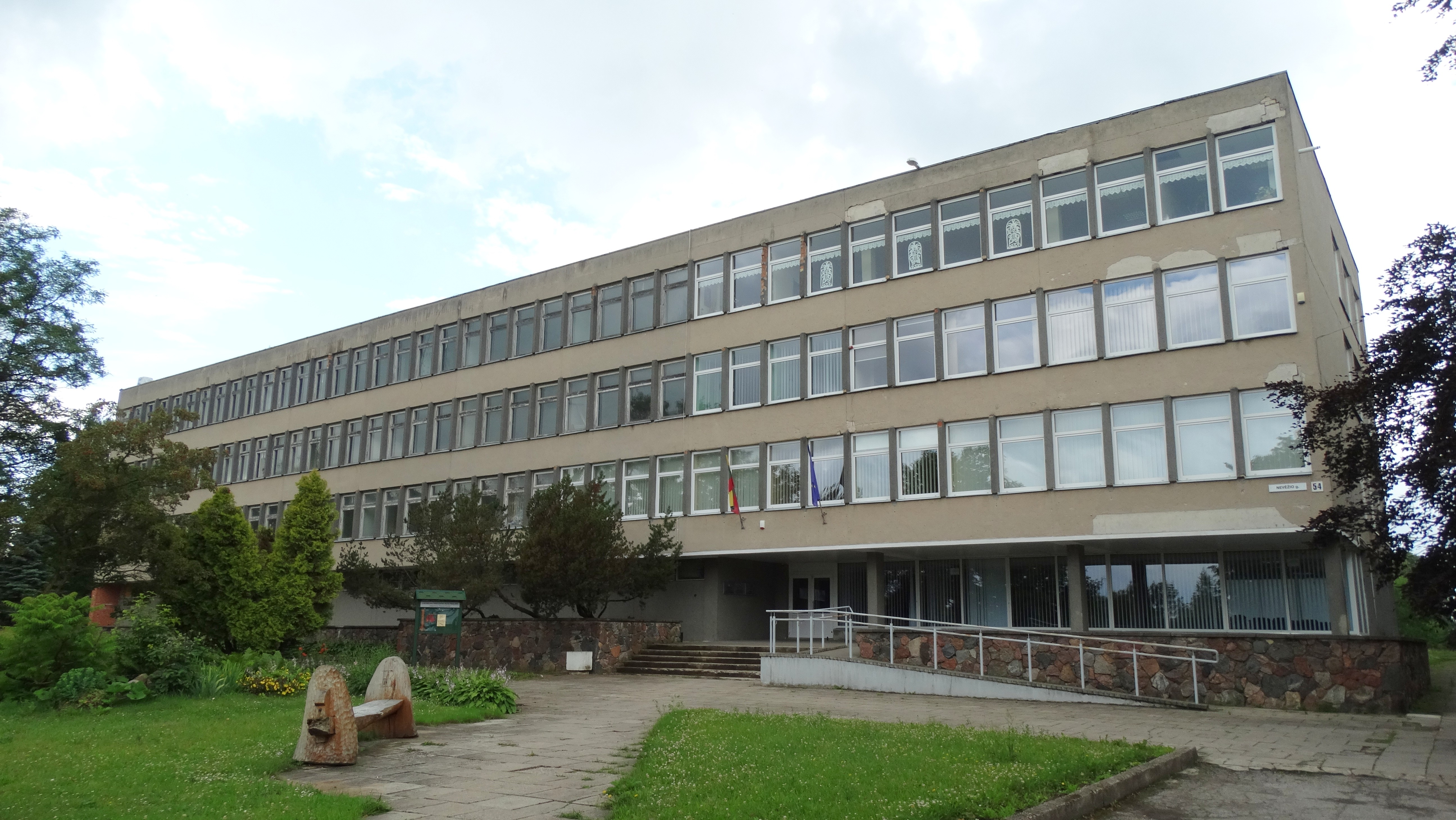

The Velžys Eldership (Lithuanian: Velžio seniūnija) is an eldership of Lithuania, located in the Panevėžys District Municipality. In 2021 its population was 6761.
