= Medingėnai Eldership =

Eldership of Lithuania

The Medingėnai Eldership (Lithuanian: Medingėnų seniūnija) is an eldership of Lithuania, located in the Rietavas Municipality. In 2021 its population was 432.
