= Utena Eldership =

Eldership of Lithuania

The Utena Eldership (Lithuanian: Utenos seniūnija) is an eldership of Lithuania, located in the Utena District Municipality. In 2021 its population was 1996.
