= Poškonys Eldership =

Eldership of Lithuania

The Poškonys Eldership (Lithuanian: Poškonių seniūnija) is an eldership of Lithuania, located in the Šalčininkai District Municipality. In 2021 its population was 566.
