= Vadokliai Eldership =

Eldership of Lithuania

The Vadokliai Eldership (Lithuanian: Vadoklių seniūnija) is an eldership of Lithuania, located in the Panevėžys District Municipality. In 2021 its population was 1529.
