= Šimkaičiai Eldership =

Eldership of Lithuania

The Šimkaičiai Eldership (Lithuanian: Šimkaičių seniūnija) is an eldership of Lithuania, located in the Jurbarkas District Municipality. In 2021 its population was 1561.
