= Žeimelis Eldership =

Eldership of Lithuania

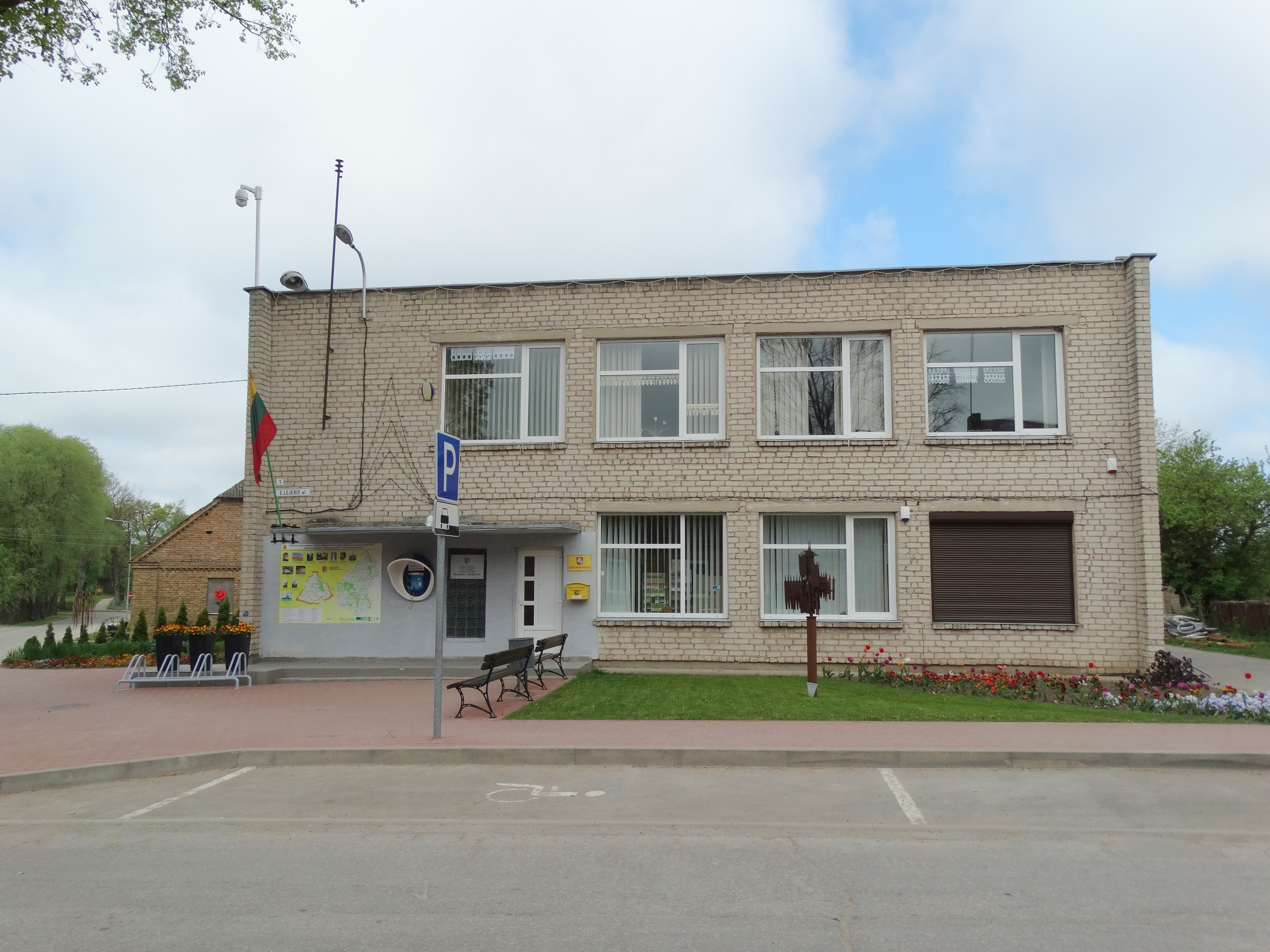
Eldership, Žeimelis, Lithuania

The Žeimelis Eldership (Lithuanian: Žeimelio seniūnija) is an eldership of Lithuania, located in the Pakruojis District Municipality. In 2021 its population was 1662.
