= Pivašiūnai Eldership =

Eldership of Lithuania

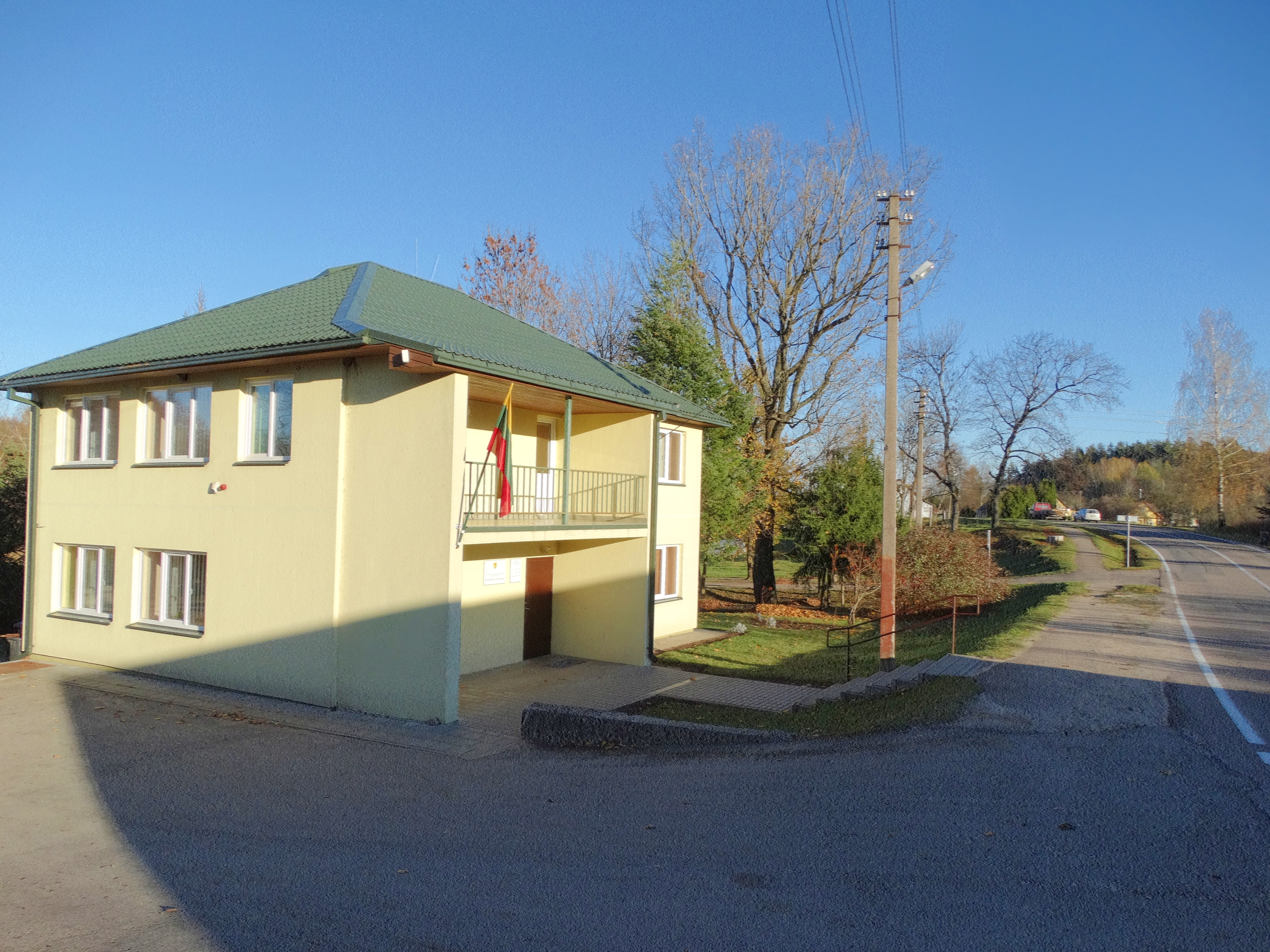
Pivašiūnai eldership, Alytus district, Lithuania

The Pivašiūnai Eldership (Lithuanian: Pivašiūnų seniūnija) is an eldership of Lithuania, located in the Alytus District Municipality. In 2021 its population was 1420.
