= Kuršėnai Rural Eldership =

Eldership of Lithuania

The Kuršėnai Rural Eldership (Lithuanian: Kuršėnų kaimiškoji seniūnija) is an eldership of Lithuania, located in the Šiauliai District Municipality. In 2021 its population was 3466.
