= Akmenynė Eldership =

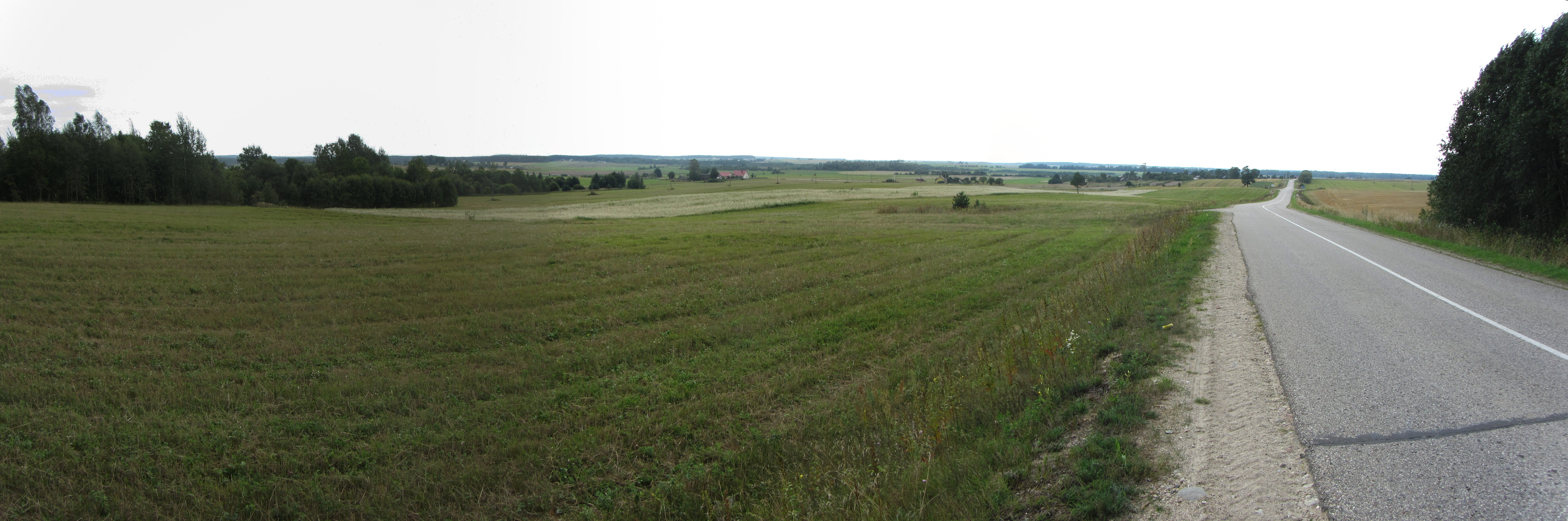

The Akmenynė Eldership (Lithuanian: Akmenynės seniūnija) is an eldership of Lithuania, located in the Šalčininkai District Municipality. In 2021 its population was 652.
