= Šunskai Eldership =

Eldership of Lithuania

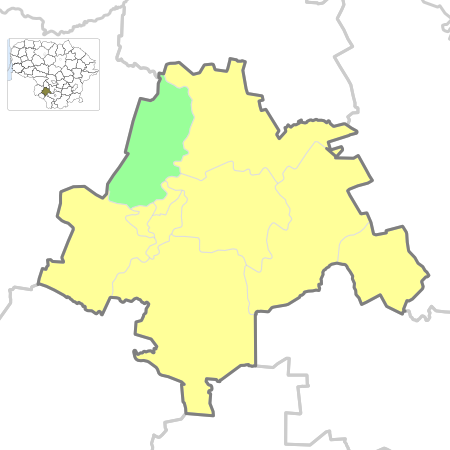
Location of Šunskai Eldership in Marijampolė Municipality

The Šunskai Eldership (Lithuanian: Šunskų seniūnija) is an eldership of Lithuania, located in the Marijampolė Municipality. In 2021 its population was 2442.
