= Suviekas Eldership =

Eldership of Lithuania

The Suviekas Eldership (Lithuanian: Suvieko seniūnija) is an eldership of Lithuania, located in the Zarasai District Municipality. In 2021 its population was 527.
