= Kazitiškis Eldership =

Eldership of Lithuania

The Kazitiškis Eldership (Lithuanian: Kazitiškio seniūnija) is an eldership of Lithuania, located in the Ignalina District Municipality. In 2021 its population was 763.
