= Gruzdžiai Eldership =

Eldership of Lithuania

The Gruzdžiai Eldership (Lithuanian: Gruzdžių seniūnija) is an eldership of Lithuania, located in the Šiauliai District Municipality. In 2021 its population was 1935.
