= Paparčiai Eldership =

Eldership of Lithuania

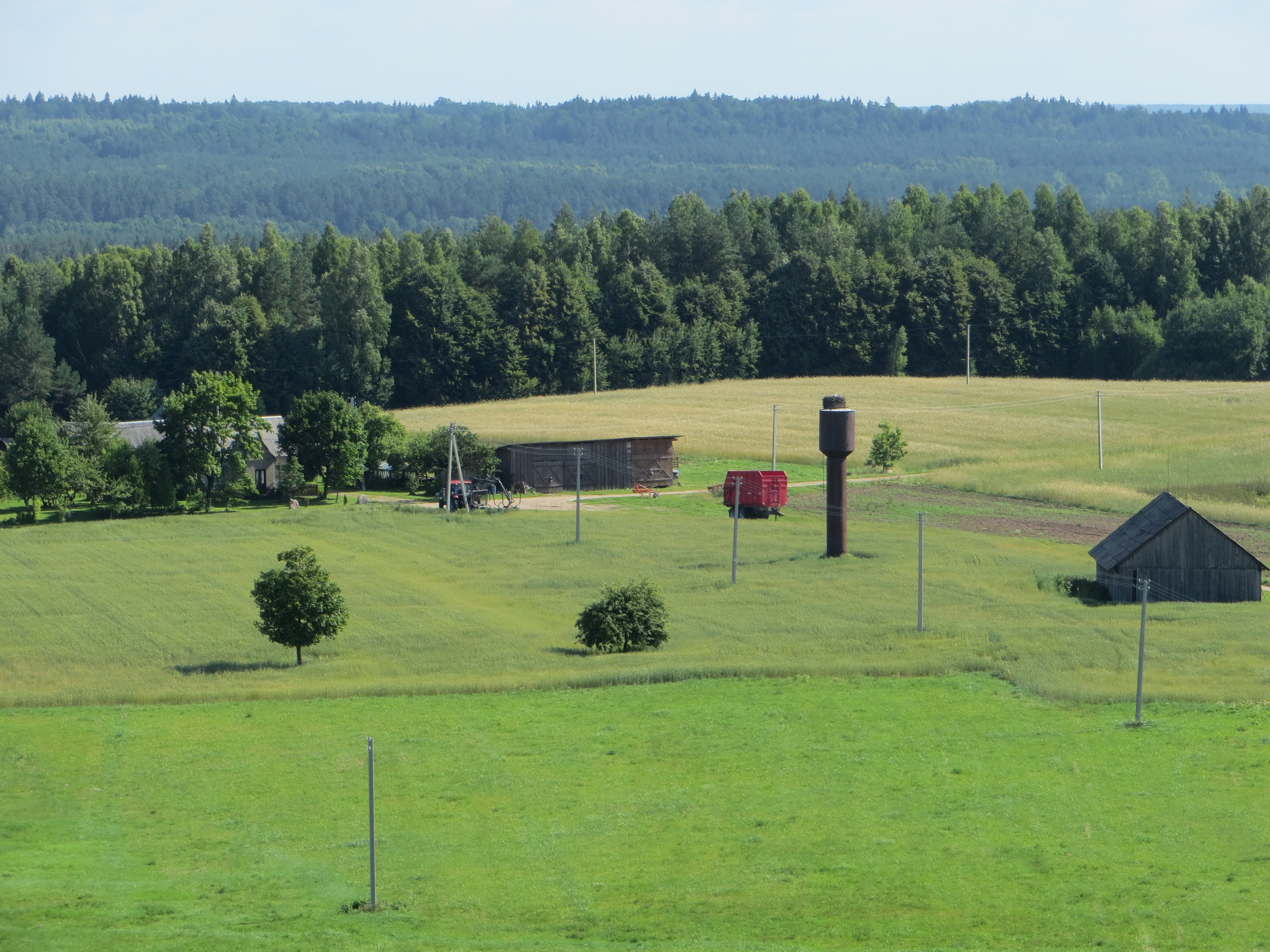
Paparčiai Eldership

The Paparčiai Eldership (Lithuanian: Paparčių seniūnija) is an eldership of Lithuania, located in the Kaišiadorys District Municipality. In 2021 its population was 573.
