= Skaistgiris Eldership =

Eldership of Lithuania

The Skaistgiris Eldership (Lithuanian: Skaistgirio seniūnija) is an eldership of Lithuania, located in the Joniškis District Municipality. In 2021 its population was 1901.
