= Simnas Eldership =

Eldership of Lithuania

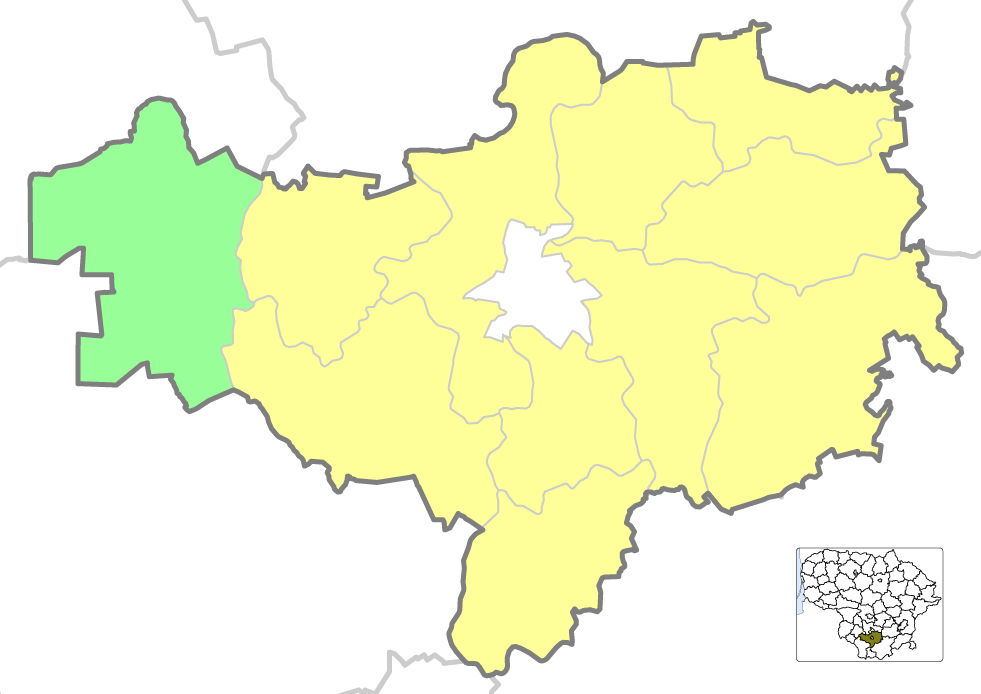
Location of Simnas Eldership in Alytus District Municipality

The Simnas Eldership (Lithuanian: Simno seniūnija) is an eldership of Lithuania, located in the Alytus District Municipality. In 2021 its population was 3148.
