= Seredžius Eldership =

Eldership of Lithuania

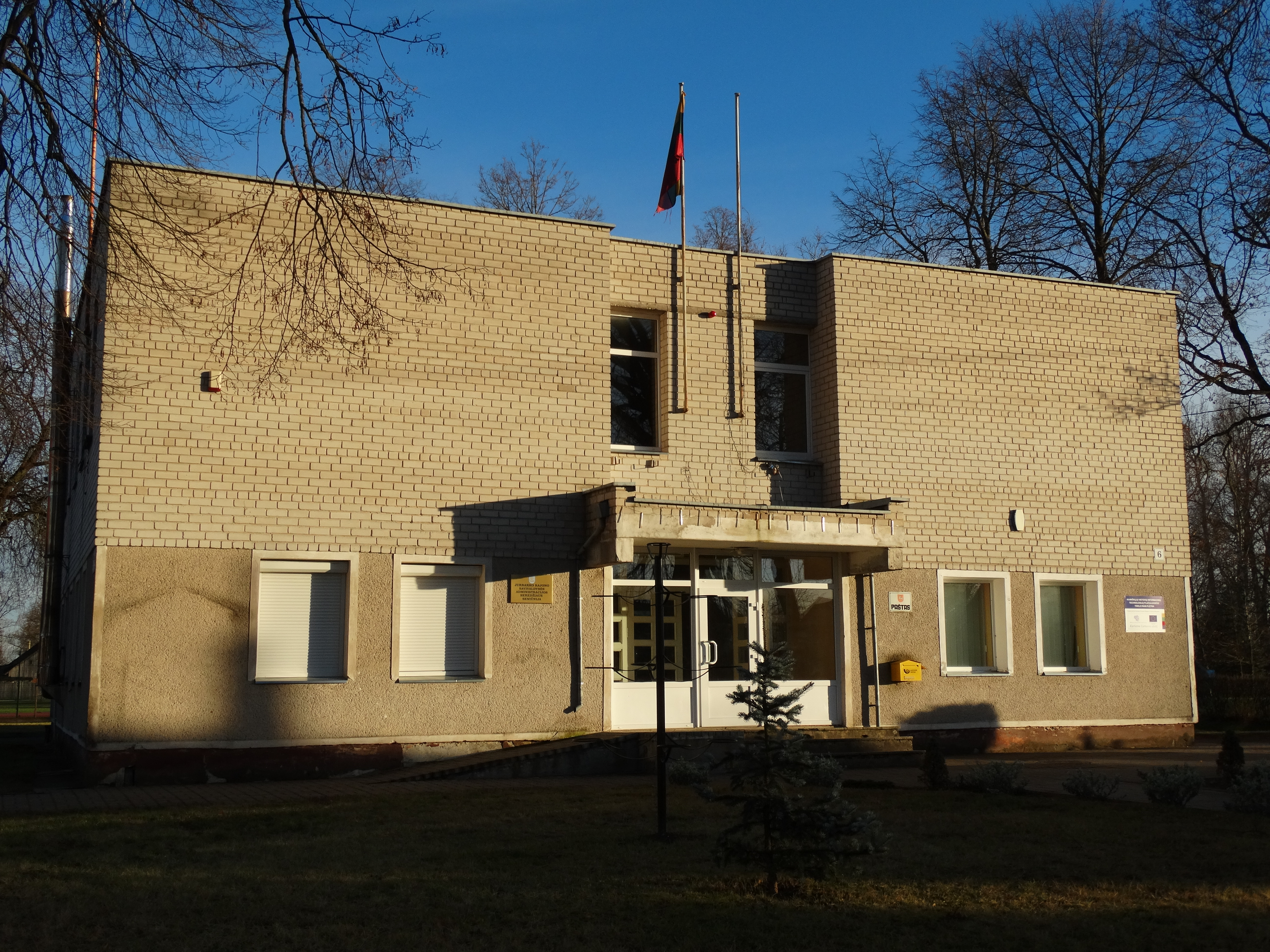
Seredžiaus building

The Seredžius Eldership (Lithuanian: Seredžiaus seniūnija) is an eldership of Lithuania, located in the Jurbarkas District Municipality. In 2021 its population was 1906.
