= Balbieriškis Eldership =

The Balbieriškis Eldership (Lithuanian: Balbieriškio seniūnija) is an eldership of Lithuania, located in the Prienai District Municipality. In 2021 its population was 2390.
