= Pakražantis Eldership =

Eldership of Lithuania

The Pakražatis Eldership (Lithuanian: Pakražančio seniūnija) is an eldership of Lithuania, located in the Kelmė District Municipality. In 2021 its population was 1643.
