= Kruopiai Eldership =

Eldership of Lithuania

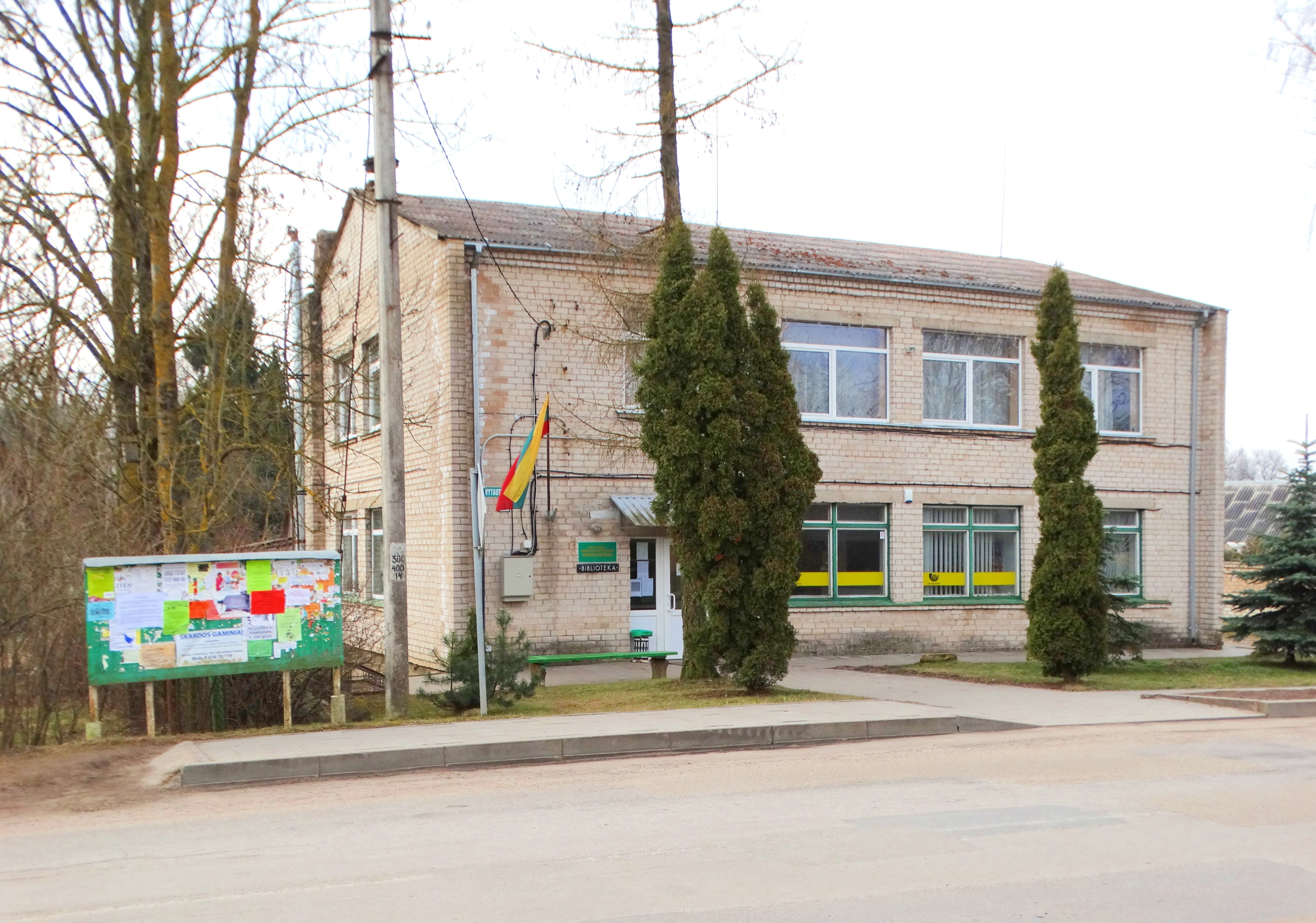
Kruopiai Eldership, Akmenė district, Lithuania

The Kruopiai Eldership (Lithuanian: Kruopių seniūnija) is an eldership of Lithuania, located in the Akmenė District Municipality. In 2021 its population was 786.
