= Keturvalakiai Eldership =

Eldership of Lithuania

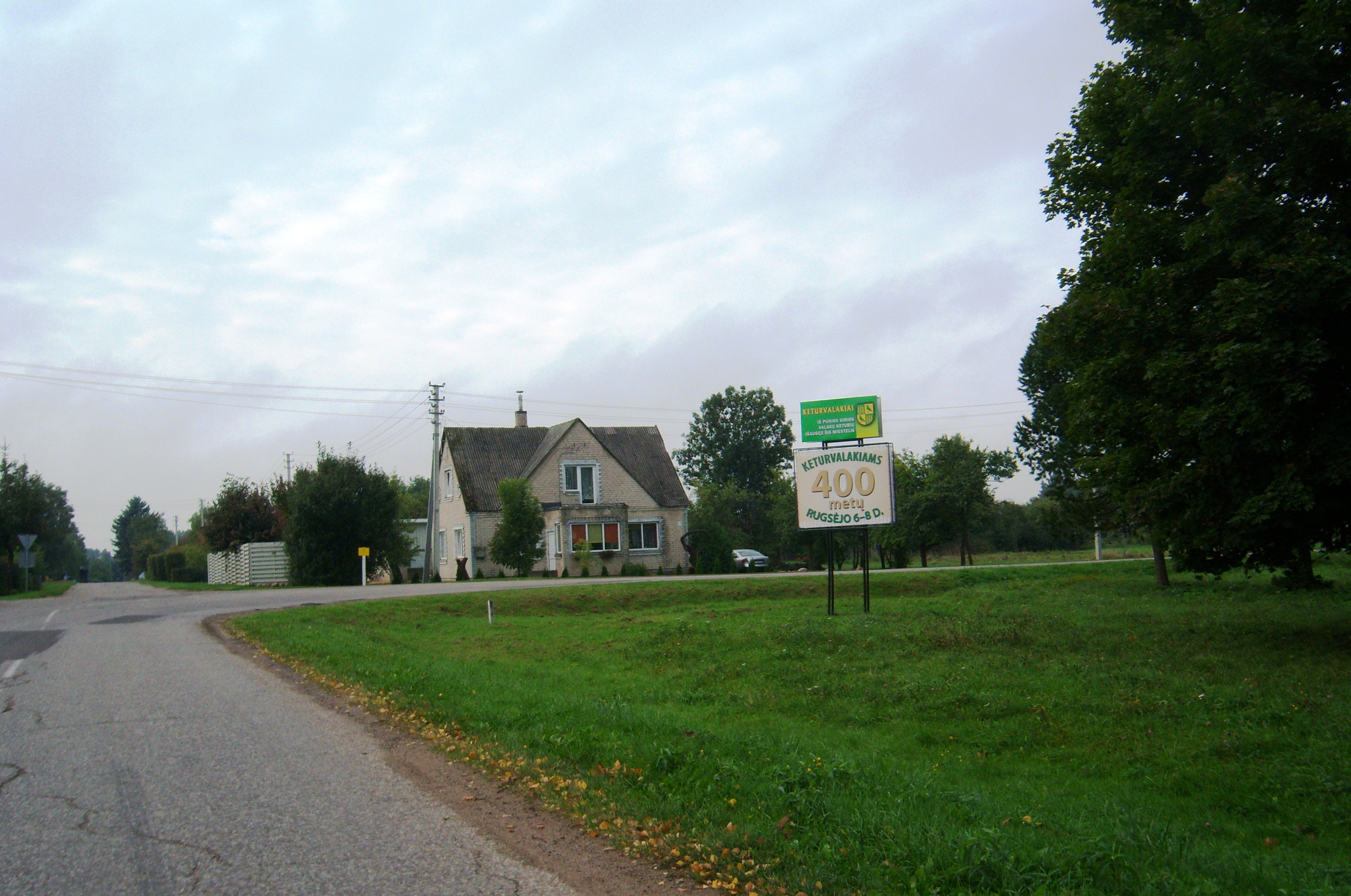
A home in Keturvalakiai, Lithuania

The Keturvalakiai Eldership (Lithuanian: Keturvalakių seniūnija) is an eldership of Lithuania, located in the Vilkaviškis District Municipality. In 2021 its population was 1354.
