= Dainava Eldership (Šalčininkai) =

Eldership of Lithuania

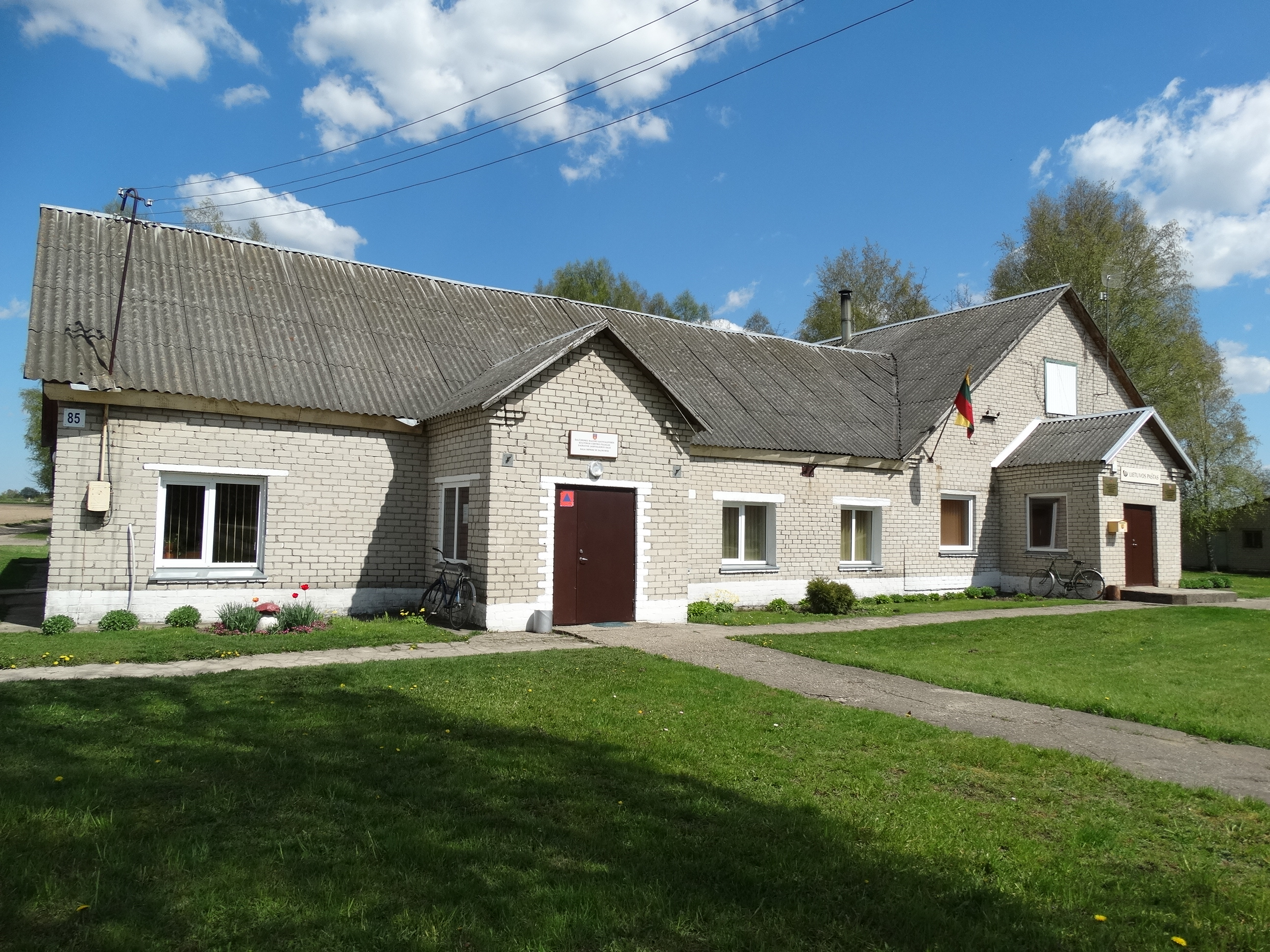
Dainava Eldership, Dainava, Šalčininkai District, Lithuania

The Dainava Eldership (Lithuanian: Dainavos seniūnija) is an eldership of Lithuania, located in the Šalčininkai District Municipality. In 2021 its population was 680.
