= Kudirkos Naumiestis Eldership =

Eldership of Lithuania

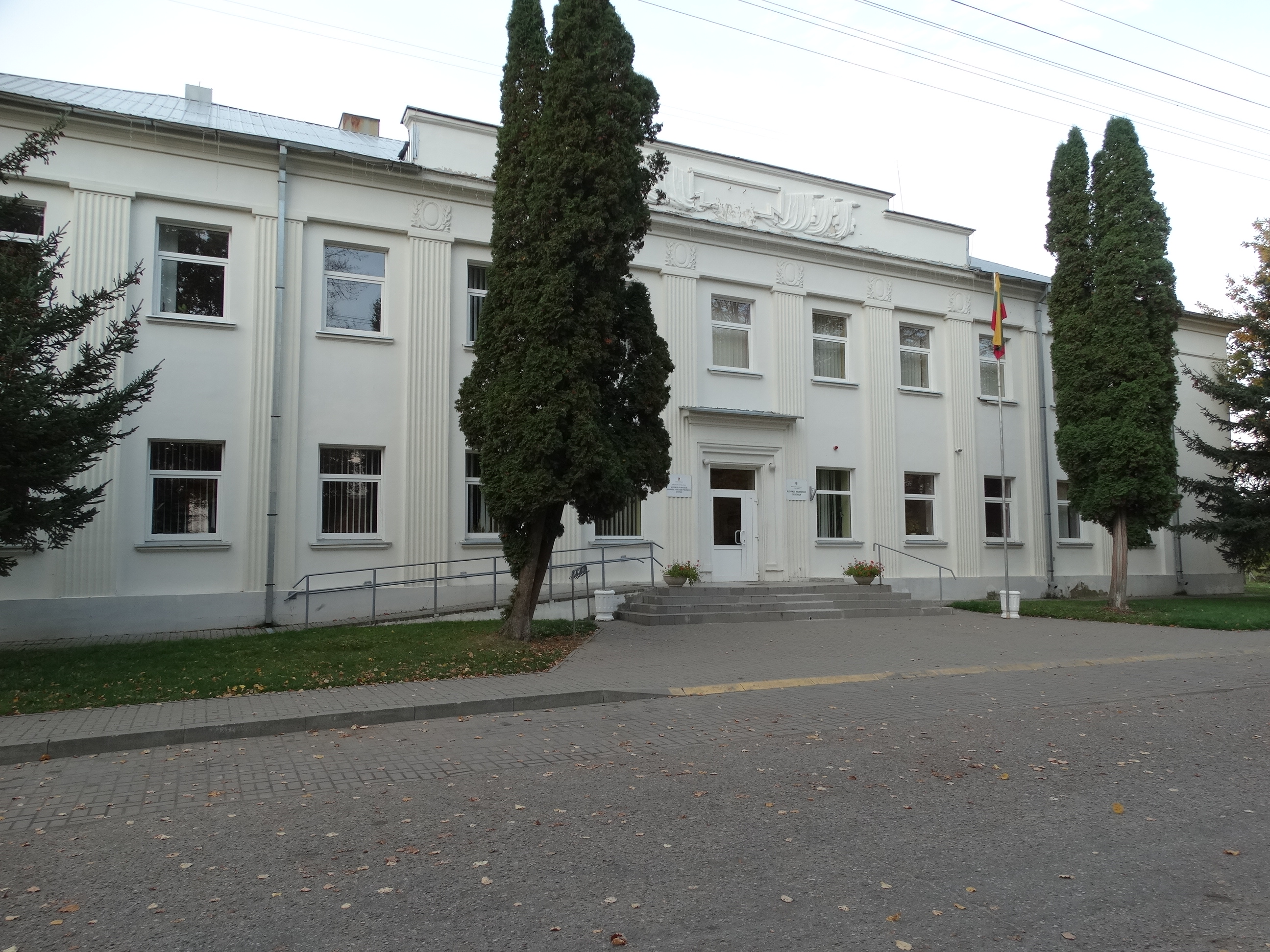
Administration of the eldership

The Kudirkos Naumiestis Eldership (Lithuanian: Kudirkos Naumiesčio seniūnija) is an eldership of Lithuania, located in the Šakiai District Municipality. In 2021 its population was 2167.
