= Venta Eldership =

Eldership of Lithuania

The Venta Eldership (Lithuanian: Ventos seniūnija) is an eldership of Lithuania, located in the Akmenė District Municipality. In 2021 its population was 2974.
