= Salakas Eldership =

Eldership of Lithuania

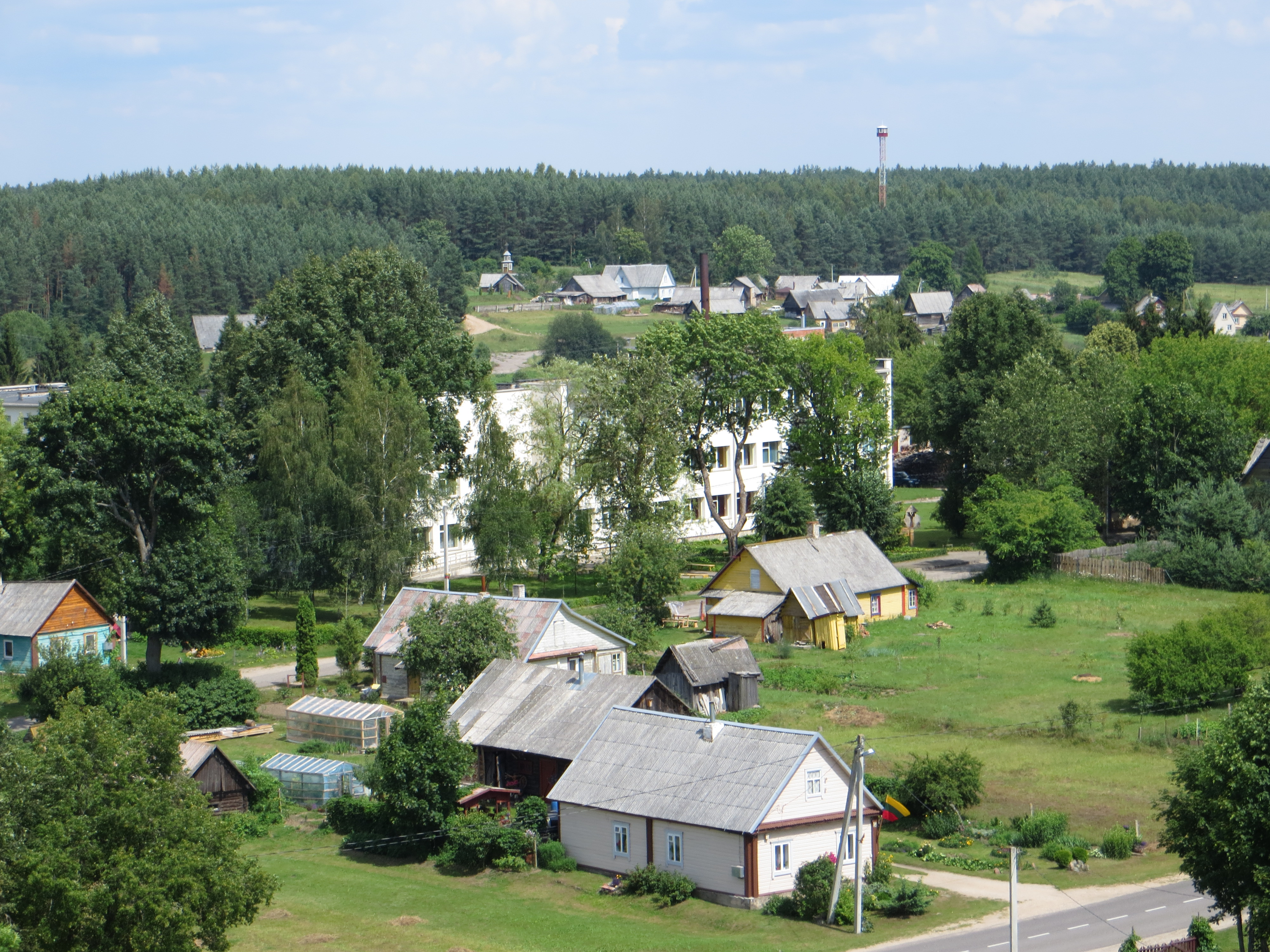
Salakas Eldership, Lithuania

The Salakas Eldership (Lithuanian: Salako seniūnija) is an eldership of Lithuania, located in the Zarasai District Municipality. In 2021 its population was 782.
