= Kukečiai Eldership =

Eldership of Lithuania

The Kukečių Eldership (Lithuanian: Kukečių seniūnija) is an eldership of Lithuania, located in the Kelmė District Municipality. In 2021 its population was 1322.
