= Ariogala Eldership =

Eldership of Lithuania

The Ariogala Eldership (Lithuanian: Ariogalos seniūnija) is an eldership of Lithuania, located in the Raseiniai District Municipality. In 2021 its population was 235.
