= Ryškėnai Eldership =

Eldership of Lithuania

The Ryškėnai Eldership (Lithuanian: Ryškėnų seniūnija) is an eldership of Lithuania, located in the Telšiai District Municipality. In 2021 its population was 2201.
