= Kelmė Area Eldership =

Eldership of Lithuania

The Kelmė Area Eldership (Lithuanian: Kelmės apylinkių seniūnija) is an eldership of Lithuania, located in the Kelmė District Municipality. In 2021 its population was 2022.
