= Namišiai Eldership =

Eldership of Lithuania

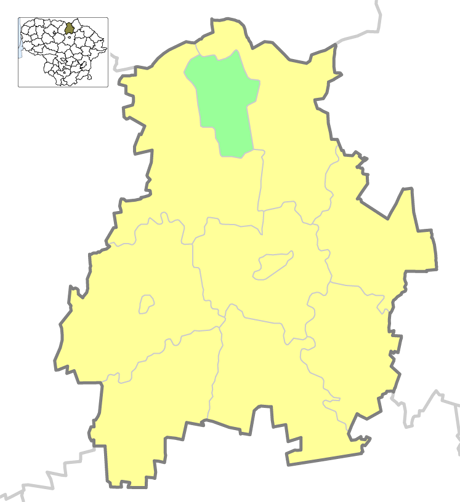

The Namišiai Eldership (Lithuanian: Namišių seniūnija) is an eldership of Lithuania, located in the Pasvalys District Municipality. In 2021 its population was 739.
