= Pasvalys Area Eldership =

Eldership of Lithuania

The Pasvalys Area Eldership (Lithuanian: Pasvalio apylinkių seniūnija) is an eldership of Lithuania, located in the Pasvalys District Municipality. In 2021 its population was 2779.
