= Jan Staniewicz =

Jan Ludwik Sylwester Staniewicz
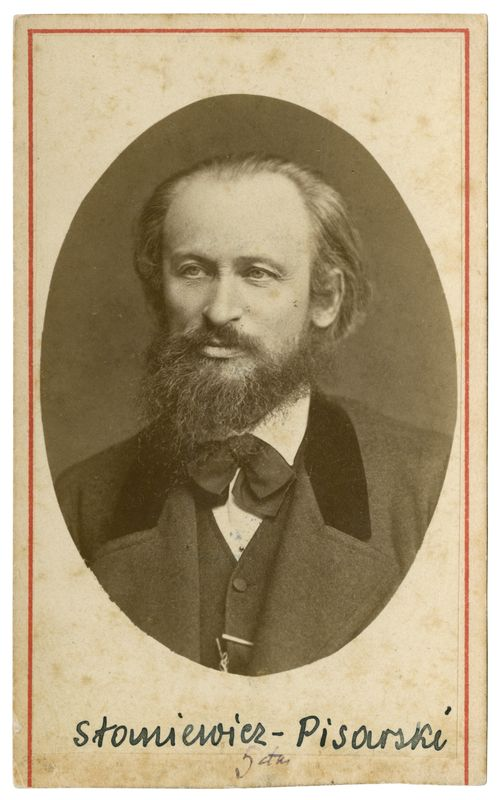
- Nickname(s): Stanisław Pisarski
- Born: 27 December 1832; Lyduvėnai or Bazilionai
- Died: 21 February 1904 (aged 71); Kamienskoye

Jan Ludwik Sylwester Staniewicz, alias Stanisław Pisarski (27 December 1823 in Lyduvėnai or Bazilionai – 21 February 1904 in Kamienskoye) was a participant of the January Uprising in Lithuania, head of the Šiauliai district. Earlier an officer of the French Foreign Legion and the Russian army,

== Biography ==
=== First years in exile ===
Eldest son of Ezechiel Staniewicz and Kunegunda Billewiczówna, grandson of Józef Billewicz. Jan's father, Ezechiel, emigrated to France after the November Uprising. Kunegunda took her underage sons from their native Samogitia to France, fearing repressions on the part of the Russian authorities (among other things, that they would be forcibly conscripted by the Russian authorities into a military school, the so-called Cantonists). They settled in Nancy, where Jan initially attended school. Later on, he would also study in Brussels, and finally - probably due to lack of funds - enlist in the Foreign Legion. As a soldier of the 1st Foreign Regiment, he served until 1848 in French Algeria, where he became a non-commissioned officer, rising to the ranks of corporal and later sergeant.

=== Participation in the Greater Poland Uprising ===
On 16 May 1848 he left Algeria, reached Poznań and took part - together with his brothers Paweł (b. 1825) and Ignacy (b. 1835) - in the Greater Poland uprising. He took part in the battles of Książ on 29 April 1848 and the following day at Miłosław.

=== In the Russian army ===
According to Stanisław Łaniec, only after the surrender of the uprising did Staniewicz leave for France, where he enlisted in the regular French army and did not return to Lithuania until 1852 when he was sent to the Russian army as a punishment. According to Janusz Wojtasik, he left for Lithuania in 1848, and in 1851 was sent to the Caucasian Corps as a punishment for serving in a foreign army.

While serving in the 81st Apsheonian Infantry Regiment he distinguished himself in the battles against Imam Shamil's forces, receiving a decoration, and in 1855 was promoted to the rank of ensign and dismissed. He returned to Samogitia and settled in Dirvonėnai, on the estate of Eligiusz Kownacki, marshal of the Šiauliai District. He remained under police surveillance for two more years. Kownacki gave him the Kownaty estate, where he settled and set up a distillery. In 1861 he married Maria Kontowtówna.

=== Participation in the January Uprising ===
He was re-involved in the work of the uprising by the priest Antanas Mackevičius, and Bolesław Dłuski in organisational work. After the uprising broke out, he organised a detachment of about 100 people in the estate of Biliūniškės (4 km south of Papilė) and was appointed head of the Šiauliai District. On April 11 he fought a battle on the road from Šiauliai to Biliūniškės with a 600-strong Russian detachment that had come to break up his group. On April 28 he fought another battle at the Biliūniškės manor house. Beaten by the Russians on 21 May near Tryškiai, he broke through to the south and joined his now 400-man detachment with the parties of Father Antanas Mackevičius, Ignacy Laskowski and Paulin Bohdanowicz.

On June 2 the group was attacked near Užventis by a Russian unit, the attack was successfully repulsed. Staniewicz fought in the group until June 6 and the battle of Tytuvėnai. He then broke off and headed towards the sea to secure the landing of Colonel Teofil Łapiński, who was carrying arms for the insurgents. Łapiński's expedition was unsuccessful. Staniewicz took over a large part of Bolesław Dłuski's unit near Pajūris, who himself went abroad. Staniewicz then headed south, where he encountered a 630-man Russian unit near Modroga on 12 July. His 170-man detachment was unable to resist the enemy and was beaten.

He then proceeded to Tauragė and began partisan fighting in the districts of Raseiniai and Šiauliai. The detachment grew to 300 partisans. The detachment hid in the forests near Lyduvėnai and then Lidomin, all the time avoiding a clash with the enemy. Staniewicz divided the grouping into five independent detachments, acting in coordination. In early October, the leaders of the units still operating in Samogitia decided to give the Russians a battle. On 19 October, the battle of Daniliškės took place, in which 25 insurgents were killed, including Paweł Staniewicz, Jan's brother. He fought until November. He then went into exile.

=== Emigration and the last years of his life ===
The Russians confiscated Kownaty and sent Staniewicz's wife to Tsivilsk (Kazan Governorate). Later she was sent to Nizhny Novgorod and after a few years was allowed to settle in Warsaw.

Staniewicz in France wrote down his Pamiętnik z r. 1863 [...] dowódcy oddziału w powiecie szawelskim (English: Diary of 1863 ... of the commander of a unit in the Šiauliai district), which was burnt down in Warsaw during the Second World War. After returning from France, he settled in Kraków, where his wife had fled from Russia. After his wife's death in 1871, he lived in Kraków for many more years. In 1896 he returned to Samogitia and lived with Ludwik Gużewski, the husband of his only daughter Helena, in Kamienskoje. After his death on 21 February 1904 he was buried in the cemetery in Upyna. His grandson was Zygmunt Gużewski, a major in the Polish army.

== Sources ==
- Łaniec, Stanisław (2002). Dowódcy i bohaterowie powstania styczniowego na Żmudzi (in Polish). Toruń.
- Wojtasik, Janusz (2002). "Jan Ludwik Sylwester Staniewicz". Polski Słownik Biograficzny (in Polish). Vol. 41. Wrocław. pp. 547–548.
