= Bolesław Roman Dłuski =

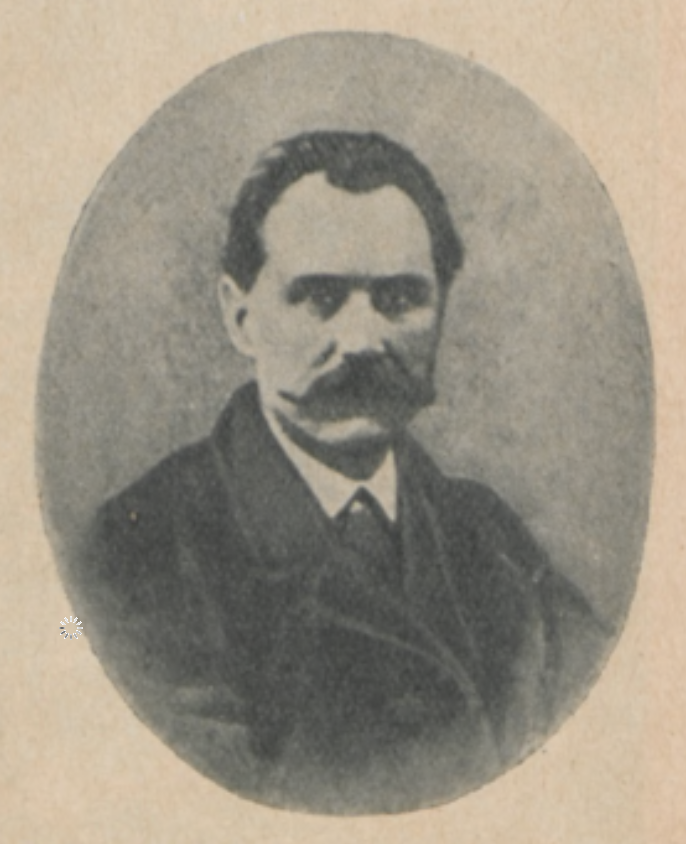
- Born: 19 August 1826; Zamūšė, Ukmergė County, or Vilnius, Russian Empire
- Died: 10 May 1905 (aged 78); Kraków, Austria-Hungary
- Other name: Jabłonowski

Bolesław Roman Dłuski, alias Jabłonowski (Lithuanian: Boleslovas Dluskis or Balys Dluskis; 19 August 1826 – 10 May 1905) was a Lithuanian physician, painter and military officer, leader of the January Uprising in Samogitia.

== Early life ==
He spent his childhood in the family estate of Zamūšė (Polish: Zamosz), Ukmergė County. He studied at the Vilnius gymnasium. In 1845, at the age of 14, he and his brother Przemysław were sentenced to prison by the Russian authorities for allegedly participating in an anti-state conspiracy.

=== Service in the Imperial Russian Army ===
Bolesław was sent to Caucasus, where he was included in a Russian penal military unit engaged in the Murid War against Imam Shamil. He remained in the army until 1856, reaching the rank of a captain in the Imperial Russian Army.

=== Studies and medical career ===
At his request, he was transferred to the reserve and then studied at St. Petersburg Imperial Academy of Arts. After a year, he moved to Moscow University, where he started medical studies. After graduation, he ran a private medical clinic in Pasvalys in Samogitia.

== January Uprising ==
While still a student, he was involved in the Red party, he continued conspirational activity while in Pasvalys. Soon he became a member of the Lithuanian Provincial Committee. He partook in talks with the Central National Committee in Warsaw, mainly about the demarcation of the spheres of activity between Central and Lithuanian Committees and the latter's level of autonomy. When the uprising broke out, Konstanty Kalinowski appointed Dłuski as the military leader of Kaunas Governorate, he went there in February 1863 and took the alias of "Jabłonowski". In the first period, he inspected the governorate's combat readiness and started first preparations. In March, with his own small unit, he went towards Panevėžys, where near the Miegėnai village, he merged with priest Antanas Mackevičius' unit. On March 27, both units victoriously fought against a larger Russian unit. Following the fight, both divisions parted and Dłuski went towards the forests of Krakės, where he joined Major Tomasz Kuszłejko's division. The newly formed group, numbering 1,000 insurgents, fought a battle on April 1 at Lenčiai, which ended with a tactical victory, but led to the group's disintegration.

At the beginning of April Jakub Gieysztor, the head of the insurgent government in Lithuania, but unlike Dłuski belonging to the Whites, dismissed Dłuski from the post of the head of the Governorate of Kaunas, appointing in his place Józef Kościałkowski. In the new situation, Dłuski took part in the formation of the unit of Zygmunt Sierakowski. To do so, he went to the Prussian border, where he picked up a load of smuggled weapons and fought two skirmishes with Russian soldiers on April 27 and 28 in their defense. The weapon was delivered to the forests near Andrioniškis, where Sierakowski was stationed. After that he went once again to the Prussian border, near Tauragė, to pick up smuggled guns. On May 11 and 12 his unit of 150 insurgents fought two victorious battles against the overwhelmingly more numerous Russian unit, near village Stemplės. The Russians, however, made it impossible to intercept the weapons.

In these circumstances, Dłuski went to Telšiai, where at the end of May he established a camp. On the way there, he was joined by the unit of Seweryn Gross "Aleksandrajtis". Jasiński's unit joined the Dłuski near Akmenė. At that moment, Dłuski's group consisted of 400 well-experienced insurgents. The unit set up a camp near the village Papilė. On June 22, the camp was attacked by the Russians, who forced the insurgents to withdraw towards the marshes near Draginiai. Thanks to a successful counterattack, the Russian troops were forced to flee inertly, as a result of which many soldiers drowned in the swamps. The victory was total, the insurgents lost only 7 killed and 6 wounded.

After the battle, Gross's unit headed towards Telšiai, while the rest of the insurgents, led by Dłuski, avoided the Russian pursuit, and headed towards the Prussian border. On the very border, Dłuski once again avoided breaking up his unit, attacked by the Russians in the vicinity of the village Pajūris. Then, discouraged by the prospects of the uprising itself, mainly due to the Vilnius government's conservative policy, he crossed the Prussian border with some insurgents, leaving the rest under the command of Jan Staniewicz-Pisarski.

Through Prussia, Dłuski went to Paris, where on behalf of the National Government he started organizing the supply of weapons to Lithuania, where the Reds, led by Kalinowski, retook the government. In February 1864, Romuald Traugutt, the National Government's head, appointed Dłuski as the head of the 5th Lithuanian Corps. Dłuski took up vigorous preparations for the resumption of the uprising in Lithuania and Samogitia. However, these efforts were unsuccessful due to the enemy's overwhelming numerical superiority.

== From 1864 to 1905 ==
After the fall of the uprising, Dłuski lived in Paris and worked at the Hôpital Saint-Louis, where he married Ernestine Noémie Hazard. After her death, he moved to London, where he worked as a painter, he also married a Polish woman Antonina Lewoniewska, she a had daughter Maria Józefa with her. In 1873, he and his wife returned to Poland and bought an estate near Kraków. He took up the job of a librarian at Museum of Science and Industry in Kraków, he also worked as a painter and ran an unregistered medical practice for his friends. Jan Matejko portrayed him as the Teutonic commander Werner von Tettingen on his painting Battle of Grunwald. He died in May 1905.

== See also ==
- List of Polish painters

== Bibliography ==
- Stanisław Łaniec, Dowódcy i bohaterowie powstania styczniowego na Żmudzi, Toruń 2002.
- Stanisław Zieliński, Obrazki z powstania 1863 r., Warsaw 1935.
