= Šilalė District Municipality =

Šilalė district municipality Šilalės rajono savivaldybė
- Municipality
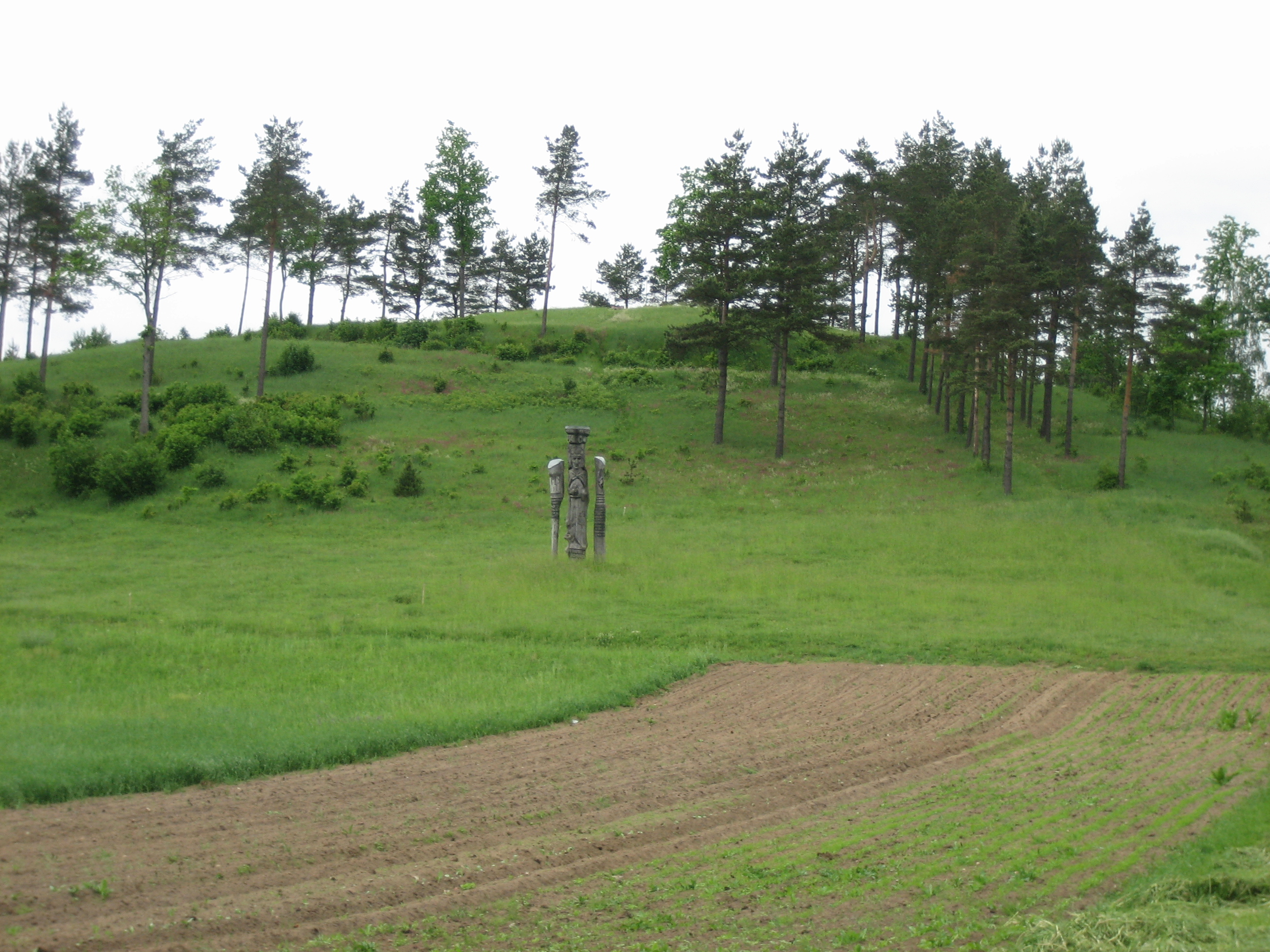
- Kepeliuškalnis

- Flag Coat of arms

- Location in Lithuania

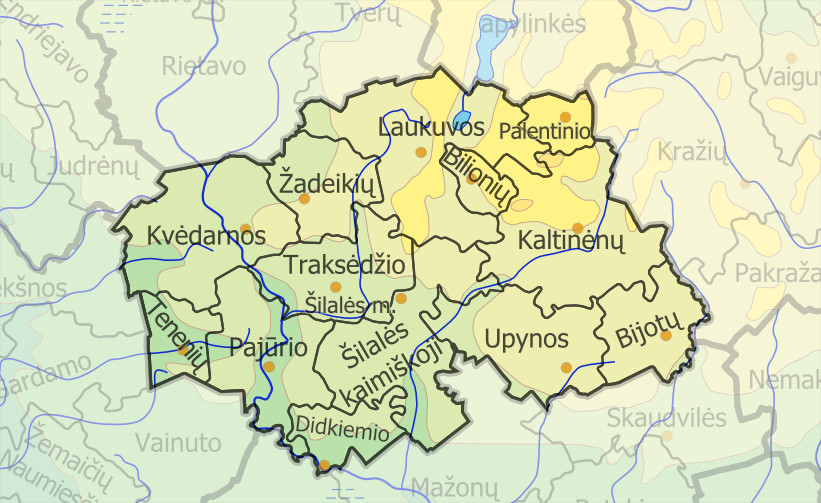
- Map of Šilalė district municipality
- Coordinates: 55°30′47″N 22°11′20″E
- Country: Lithuania
- Ethnographic region: Samogitia
- County: Tauragė
- Capital: Šilalė
- Elderships: 14

Area
  - Total: 1,188 km^{2} (459 sq mi)
  - Rank: 32nd

Population (2021)
  - Total: 22,051
  - Rank: 40th
  - Density: 18.56/km^{2} (48.07/sq mi)
  - Rank: 41st
- Time zone: UTC+2 (EET)
  - Summer (DST): UTC+3 (EEST)
- Telephone code: 449
- Major settlements: Šilalė (pop. 4,640)
- Website: www.silale.lt

Šilalė District Municipality (Lithuanian: Šilalės rajono savivaldybė, Samogitian: Šėlalės rajuona savivaldībė) is a municipality in Tauragė County, Lithuania.

== Elderships ==
The Šilalė district municipality contains 14 elderships (seniūnijos); the main town or village is listed for each.

1. Bijotai Eldership – Bijotai
2. Bilionys Eldership – Bilionys
3. Didkiemis Eldership – Didkiemis
4. Kaltinėnai Eldership – Kaltinėnai
5. Kvėdarna Eldership – Kvėdarna
6. Laukuva Eldership – Laukuva
7. Pajūris Eldership – Pajūris
8. Palentinis Eldership – Palentinis
9. Šilalė Area Eldership – Šilalė
10. Šilalė City Eldership – Šilalė
11. Teneniai Eldership – Teneniai
12. Traksėdis Eldership – Šilalė
13. Upyna Eldership – Upyna
14. Žadeikiai Eldership – Žadeikiai

== Settlements ==
The Šilalė district municipality contains:

- 1 city (miestas) - Šilalė
- 7 towns (miesteliai) - Kaltinėnai, Kvėdarna, Laukuva, Pajūris, Teneniai, Upyna, Žvingiai
- 435 villages (kaimai)

The largest settlements, with population as of 2001:

- Šilalė – 6281
- Kvėdarna – 1934
- Laukuva – 998
- Pajūris – 872
- Kaltinėnai – 835
- Pajūralis – 633
- Šiauduva – 436
- Vingininkai – 410
- Upyna – 409
- Teneniai – 369

== Population by locality ==
2011 Census
Locality	Status	Total	Male	Female
Šilalės d. mun.		26,520	12,752	13,768
Bijotai Eldership		992	518	474
Antininkai	K	28	13	15
Bardžiai	K	59	25	34
Bijotai	K	217	115	102
Cipkiškiai	K	8	4	4
Dauba	K	7	3	4
Gedeikiai	K	0	0	0
Girdiškė	K	150	81	69
Kalniškiai	K	0	0	0
Kazokai	K	7	3	4
Klabai	K	0	0	0
Košiai I	K	103	58	45
Košiai II	K	27	13	14
Kumečiai	K	0	0	0
Maldūnai	K	6	4	2
Mankiškė	K	23	11	12
Padvariai	K	12	5	7
Pagirdiškė	K	10	5	5
Pakarčemis	K	37	24	13
Palaima	K	9	4	5
Palyženis	K	3	1	2
Pavėriai	K	8	4	4
Pilsūdai	K	7	4	3
Pliupiai	K	7	5	2
Poškakaimis	K	84	45	39
Simėnai	K	68	34	34
Šimkaičiai	K	3	1	2
Šlapeikiai	K	11	7	4
Tūjainiai	K	95	47	48
Vaidatoniai	K	3	2	1
Bilionys Eldership		447	238	209
Aukštagirė	K	3	2	1
Baravykai	K	45	25	20
Bilioniai	K	259	135	124
Gulbės	K	105	54	51
Padvarninkai	K	2	1	1
Plunksnės	K	16	10	6
Stoniai	K	17	11	6
Didkiemis Eldership		307	142	165
Didkiemis	K	228	107	121
Gerviškė	K	0	0	0
Kuiniškiai	K	0	0	0
Laumenai	K	34	13	21
Pažiuržmotis	K	15	7	8
Vartulėnai	K	30	15	15
Kaltinėnai Eldership		2,524	1,218	1,306
Ąžuolija	K	33	15	18
Bartašiškė	K	93	52	41
Bartkiškė	K	16	6	10
Burniai	K	0	0	0
Butkaičiai	K	0	0	0
Dirgėlai	K	15	5	10
Donylos	K	0	0	0
Dvarčius	K	18	12	6
Ganyprova	K	0	0	0
Gardiškė	K	1	0	1
Gaučai	K	28	15	13
Gaudvaišai	K	10	6	4
Gedminiškė	K	32	18	14
Gimbūčiai	K	0	0	0
Gineikiai	K	191	93	98
Iždonai	K	121	60	61
Jankaičiai	K	6	2	4
Jaunodava	K	43	22	21
Jogminiškė	K	19	9	10
Juodžiai	K	20	10	10
Kaltinėnai	MST	728	332	396
Kanapukai	K	0	0	0
Karklėnaliai	K	0	0	0
Kastauniškė	K	0	0	0
Katyčiai	K	4	3	1
Kaušai	K	44	22	22
Kiaukaliai	K	8	4	4
Krūtilės	K	35	18	17
Kutaliai	K	15	9	6
Kvesčiai	K	18	8	10
Labardžiai	K	42	23	19
Lauciškė	K	3	2	1
Lauksargis	K	6	2	4
Laumenai	K	27	14	13
Lingėniškė	K	1	1	0
Mažuoliai	K	0	0	0
Meirės	K	0	0	0
Milaičiai	K	11	4	7
Miliai	K	1	0	1
Misaičiai	K	28	11	17
Nuomininkai	K	49	24	25
Orvydiškė	K	12	7	5
Paašvijis	K	6	2	4
Pabaliai	K	19	10	9
Paežerupis	K	0	0	0
Pagrybis	K	105	45	60
Pakalniškiai	K	15	7	8
Pakarčemis	K	56	30	26
Pasausalis	K	17	7	10
Pelkės	K	108	55	53
Pempės	K	17	5	12
Pesiai	K	12	4	8
Pilės	K	17	9	8
Prienai	K	15	8	7
Putvinskiai	K	11	4	7
Radiškė	K	97	46	51
Rėzgaliai	K	54	27	27
Rukšiai	K	0	0	0
Rusliai	K	7	4	3
Rūčiai	K	15	9	6
Rūteliai	K	123	61	62
Skabučiai	K	0	0	0
Skindėriškė	K	0	0	0
Sodalė	K	11	4	7
Šakiai	K	28	13	15
Šaltiškė	K	11	6	5
Šiukšeliai	K	0	0	0
Šliužos	K	15	7	8
Trakas	K	21	13	8
Určiniškė	K	2	1	1
Užpelkis	K	6	4	2
Vosgirdai	K	19	10	9
Žiliai	K	39	18	21
Kvėdarna Eldership		3,407	1,626	1,781
Ąžuolija	K	17	9	8
Budriai	K	45	20	25
Buišiai	K	13	4	9
Capiškiai	K	0	0	0
Degimai	K	6	2	4
Degutgiris	K	0	0	0
Gagačiai	K	0	0	0
Geniotas	K	59	33	26
Gražjūris	K	70	37	33
Grimzdai	K	220	106	114
Gvaldai	K	56	31	25
Kadagynai	K	69	36	33
Kalnyčiai	K	38	19	19
Kekiškės	K	21	6	15
Kerbedžiai	K	15	8	7
Kukštinė	K	7	3	4
Kvėdarna	K	96	40	56
Kvėdarna	MST	1,597	744	853
Lembas	K	86	41	45
Nasvytaliai	K	7	2	5
Padievaitis	K	27	15	12
Pajūralis	K	493	237	256
Pampliškė	K	5	4	1
Papynaujis	K	34	14	20
Paragaudis	K	166	79	87
Pūslaukis	K	9	5	4
Radvietis	K	13	10	3
Rudlaukis	K	11	4	7
Sauslaukis	K	138	74	64
Skerdynai	K	11	5	6
Sodalė	K	0	0	0
Stigrėnai	K	5	2	3
Stirbiškė	K	8	4	4
Šakėnai	K	46	24	22
Šerlaukis	K	17	7	10
Uršulynas	K	2	1	1
Laukuva Eldership		3,106	1,495	1,611
Apvaršuva	K	45	22	23
Bagdonas	K	12	6	6
Baltkalnis	K	16	6	10
Baubliai	K	13	5	8
Buciškė	K	21	11	10
Bučiai	K	0	0	0
Burbiškiai	K	15	7	8
Dainiškė	K	15	7	8
Dargaliai	K	13	6	7
Dargiai	K	23	15	8
Degliškė	K	61	29	32
Degučiai I	K	35	18	17
Degučiai II	K	13	3	10
Degutaliai	K	8	5	3
Didieji Vankiai	K	44	24	20
Dvarviečiai	K	94	45	49
Eitvydaičiai	K	15	9	6
Endrikavas	K	9	4	5
Gatautiškė	K	40	19	21
Girvainiai	K	101	44	57
Josūdiškė	K	5	4	1
Juodainiai	K	126	57	69
Kalnėnai	K	17	10	7
Kantautai	K	18	9	9
Kantautaliai	K	23	11	12
Karūžiškė I	K	25	12	13
Karūžiškė II	K	1	0	1
Kaštaunaliai	K	35	19	16
Kelpšaičiai	K	11	6	5
Kikoniai	K	5	3	2
Kuitainiai	K	0	0	0
Laukdvariai	K	54	30	24
Laukuva	MST	832	381	451
Malavėnai	K	7	2	5
Mankiškė	K	18	9	9
Mėčiai	K	9	4	5
Norvaišiai	K	5	2	3
Padievytis	K	31	17	14
Payžnys	K	14	8	6
Palaukuvis	K	28	12	16
Palygumis	K	1	0	1
Palokystalis	K	0	0	0
Pievininkai	K	0	0	0
Pykaičiai	K	56	27	29
Pykaitaliai	K	10	4	6
Požerė	K	222	111	111
Reistrai	K	4	1	3
Ręsčiai	K	7	4	3
Riešketai	K	17	8	9
Rudiškė	K	17	7	10
Ruskiai	K	54	34	20
Samoškaliai	K	5	1	4
Selvestrai	K	21	11	10
Stirbiškė	K	26	13	13
Strazdaliai	K	25	8	17
Stročiai	K	60	30	30
Stungaičiai	K	53	21	32
Šiauduva	K	376	194	182
Šukolai	K	4	2	2
Tautvilai	K	32	14	18
Trakogalis	K	10	5	5
Treigiai	K	52	22	30
Trumpainiai	K	17	9	8
Vabalai	K	111	57	54
Vaikių Laukas	K	0	0	0
Vaitkaičiai I	K	38	17	21
Vaitkaičiai II	K	8	3	5
Virkės	K	0	0	0
Virpylai	K	23	11	12
Pajūris Eldership		2,174	1,085	1,089
Ąžuolija	K	4	3	1
Bačiškė	K	16	6	10
Barboravas	K	2	1	1
Dapkiškė	K	28	16	12
Džiaugėnai	K	73	37	36
Griaužai	K	5	3	2
Gulbiškiai	K	48	25	23
Jomantai	K	202	100	102
Jonaičiai	K	36	17	19
Kalniškiai I	K	47	21	26
Kamščiai	K	9	6	3
Keberkščiai	K	93	47	46
Kirnės I	K	10	2	8
Kirnės II	K	3	1	2
Kukariškė	K	0	0	0
Kunigiškiai	K	34	19	15
Kusiai	K	35	17	18
Libartai	K	9	8	1
Lileikėnai	K	27	10	17
Loma	K	13	7	6
Maskolija	K	0	0	0
Medeliškė	K	9	5	4
Nedojės	K	20	12	8
Paežeris	K	11	7	4
Pailgotis	K	2	1	1
Pajūris	MST	784	388	396
Pakalniškiai I	K	26	11	15
Pakisys	K	95	42	53
Palaivis	K	34	19	15
Paskarbiškiai	K	34	18	16
Pažvėris	K	19	9	10
Reistrai	K	55	27	28
Spingiai	K	0	0	0
Spraudaičiai	K	30	15	15
Stegvilai	K	20	11	9
Stigraliai	K	0	0	0
Tūbučiai	K	35	18	17
Užjūris	K	4	2	2
Užlaidinė	K	0	0	0
Vidutiškė	K	8	4	4
Vilkų Laukas	K	4	1	3
Visdžiaugai	K	95	51	44
Žvingiai	MST	195	98	97
Palentinis Eldership		260	121	139
Beržė	K	77	38	39
Gudaičiai	K	7	3	4
Lentinė	K	0	0	0
Palentinis	K	80	42	38
Pinciškė	K	3	1	2
Ruška	K	8	2	6
Severėnai	K	34	14	20
Smalkviečiai	K	37	17	20
Spingiai	K	1	0	1
Varsneliai	K	13	4	9
Šilalė Area Eldership		2,951	1,423	1,528
Andriejaičiai	K	61	30	31
Apidėmės	K	6	2	4
Balsiai	K	286	135	151
Biržų Laukas	K	312	159	153
Bytaučiai	K	8	6	2
Bytlaukis	K	140	69	71
Brokštėnai	K	10	4	6
Burkėnai	K	99	44	55
Debliai	K	51	27	24
Eidžiotai	K	0	0	0
Gedėliškė	K	9	6	3
Gerdučiai	K	4	3	1
Girininkai	K	10	6	4
Griguliai	K	12	6	6
Indija	K	9	4	5
Jakaičiai	K	13	6	7
Jokūbaičiai	K	60	30	30
Jucaičiai	K	284	137	147
Kalniškiai (Šilalės)	K	15	6	9
Kelmutiškė	K	9	5	4
Kiaukai	K	75	35	40
Kilpinės	K	1	1	0
Klekniškė	K	3	2	1
Kreiviai	K	11	2	9
Kūtymai	K	99	49	50
Lašiškė	K	2	0	2
Lentinė	K	47	19	28
Mažrimai	K	11	5	6
Mišučiai	K	48	23	25
Panerotis	K	27	14	13
Pūtvė	K	11	4	7
Ryškas	K	1	0	1
Romės Laukas	K	5	1	4
Rugienos	K	9	5	4
Struikai	K	247	125	122
Šilai	K	248	120	128
Šoliai	K	32	16	16
Tūbinės I	K	215	99	116
Tūbinės II	K	39	19	20
Vaičiai	K	33	13	20
Vaišnoriškė	K	3	1	2
Vingininkai	K	357	167	190
Zobielija	K	8	4	4
Žviliai	K	21	14	7
Šilalė City Eldership		5,492	2,512	2,980
Šilalė	M	5,492	2,512	2,980
Teneniai Eldership		530	271	259
Adomavas	K	28	15	13
Barsukinė	K	19	11	8
Kalniškiai II	K	83	40	43
Mažieji Girininkai	K	0	0	0
Pakalniškiai II	K	37	19	18
Šusčiai	K	0	0	0
Teneniai	MST	330	167	163
Vidgirė	K	33	19	14
Traksėdis Eldership		1,739	853	886
Antupalis	K	9	5	4
Bokštai	K	120	60	60
Dirkintai	K	138	72	66
Drobūkštaliai	K	34	17	17
Drobūkščiai	K	296	141	155
Gūbriai	K	80	41	39
Gūvainiai	K	64	29	35
Kadarės	K	17	7	10
Kadžyga	K	28	12	16
Kerbedžiai	K	5	2	3
Kuodaičiai	K	15	9	6
Lapkalnis	K	5	1	4
Leviškiai	K	34	17	17
Lingiškė	K	97	55	42
Nevočiai	K	148	76	72
Norvainiai	K	8	3	5
Pakasokis	K	3	1	2
Pėpliškė	K	57	25	32
Rubaičiai	K	7	4	3
Rubinavas	K	56	28	28
Siauteliai	K	2	1	1
Sėdėjimai	K	9	5	4
Šarkai	K	38	20	18
Šėrikai	K	79	36	43
Šiaudaliai	K	11	6	5
Traksėdis	K	246	124	122
Užsienis	K	17	5	12
Vabolės	K	19	10	9
Žąsinalis	K	26	13	13
Žąsinas	K	71	28	43
Upyna Eldership		1,830	879	951
Aukštutiškė	K	0	0	0
Būbliškė	K	3	0	3
Driežai	K	25	16	9
Dungeriai	K	27	11	16
Dungeriukai	K	21	10	11
Dvariškiai	K	4	2	2
Dvarviečiai	K	5	1	4
Dvyliškė I	K	13	4	9
Eželiškės	K	13	8	5
Gaidėnai	K	27	14	13
Galvyčiai	K	19	11	8
Gaubtys	K	3	2	1
Gegužės	K	0	0	0
Girsteikiai	K	7	5	2
Gudirvės	K	11	5	6
Juškaičiai	K	9	5	4
Kalvaliai	K	3	2	1
Kazokai I	K	7	4	3
Kliūkiai	K	29	15	14
Kraikai	K	7	2	5
Lingės	K	41	20	21
Lingių Fermos	K	5	2	3
Mankaičiai	K	15	6	9
Miškiniai	K	10	7	3
Naujasis Obelynas	K	335	158	177
Negėrai	K	18	10	8
Paakmenis	K	50	25	25
Pabremenis	K	35	15	20
Paežeris	K	118	57	61
Paiekvedis	K	5	3	2
Pajėrubynis	K	22	9	13
Pakoplyčis	K	49	22	27
Papaukštkalnis	K	10	7	3
Patulė	K	6	3	3
Paupis	K	6	2	4
Paupynis	K	25	10	15
Pavarsėdis	K	6	3	3
Pazimkalnis	K	11	4	7
Petkalnis	K	32	15	17
Plaušiniškė	K	7	5	2
Rudaliai	K	4	4	0
Rusų Obelynas	K	10	6	4
Senasis Obelynas	K	48	21	27
Upyna	K	24	13	11
Upyna	MST	375	171	204
Užkalnis	K	1	0	1
Varsėdžiai	K	119	63	56
Vedriai	K	21	10	11
Vytogala	K	162	79	83
Žakaimė	K	27	12	15
Žadeikiai Eldership		761	371	390
Alkupis	K	34	14	20
Dulkių Laukas	K	35	18	17
Girininkai I	K	8	4	4
Girininkai II	K	0	0	0
Ievoniškiai	K	29	17	12
Klabai	K	32	16	16
Kuliškiai	K	26	16	10
Mikūlės	K	29	16	13
Padvarninkai	K	77	36	41
Paymėžis	K	51	26	25
Palokystis	K	69	32	37
Prapymas	K	56	27	29
Šaukliškė	K	0	0	0
Šeručiai	K	43	20	23
Šventai	K	0	0	0
Žadeikiai	K	272	129	143

- Status: M, MST - city, town / K, GST - village / VS - steading
