= Gūbriai =

- Village
- Location within Lithuania
- Coordinates: 55°31′30″N 022°11′02″E
- Country: Lithuania
- County: Tauragė County
- Municipality: Šilalė District Municipality
- Eldership: Traksėdis Eldership

Population (2011 Census)
  - Total: 80
- Time zone: UTC+2 (EET)
  - Summer (DST): UTC+3 (EEST)

Gūbriai is a village in the Šilalė District Municipality, Tauragė County, Lithuania. According to the 2011 census, the village had a population of 80 people, a decline from 97 in 2001 and 248 in 1959. The village is known from 1562 when it was mentioned in the inventory of the royal estate of Šiauduva.
