= Zarasai Eldership =

Eldership of Lithuania

The Zarasai Eldership (Lithuanian: Zarasų seniūnija) is an eldership of Lithuania, located in the Šilalė District Municipality. In 2021 its population was 1894.
