= Žadeikiai Eldership =

Eldership of Lithuania

The Žadeikiai Eldership (Lithuanian: Žadeikių seniūnija) is an eldership of Lithuania, located in the Šilalė District Municipality. In 2021 its population was 666.
