= Upyna Eldership (Šilalė) =

Eldership of Lithuania

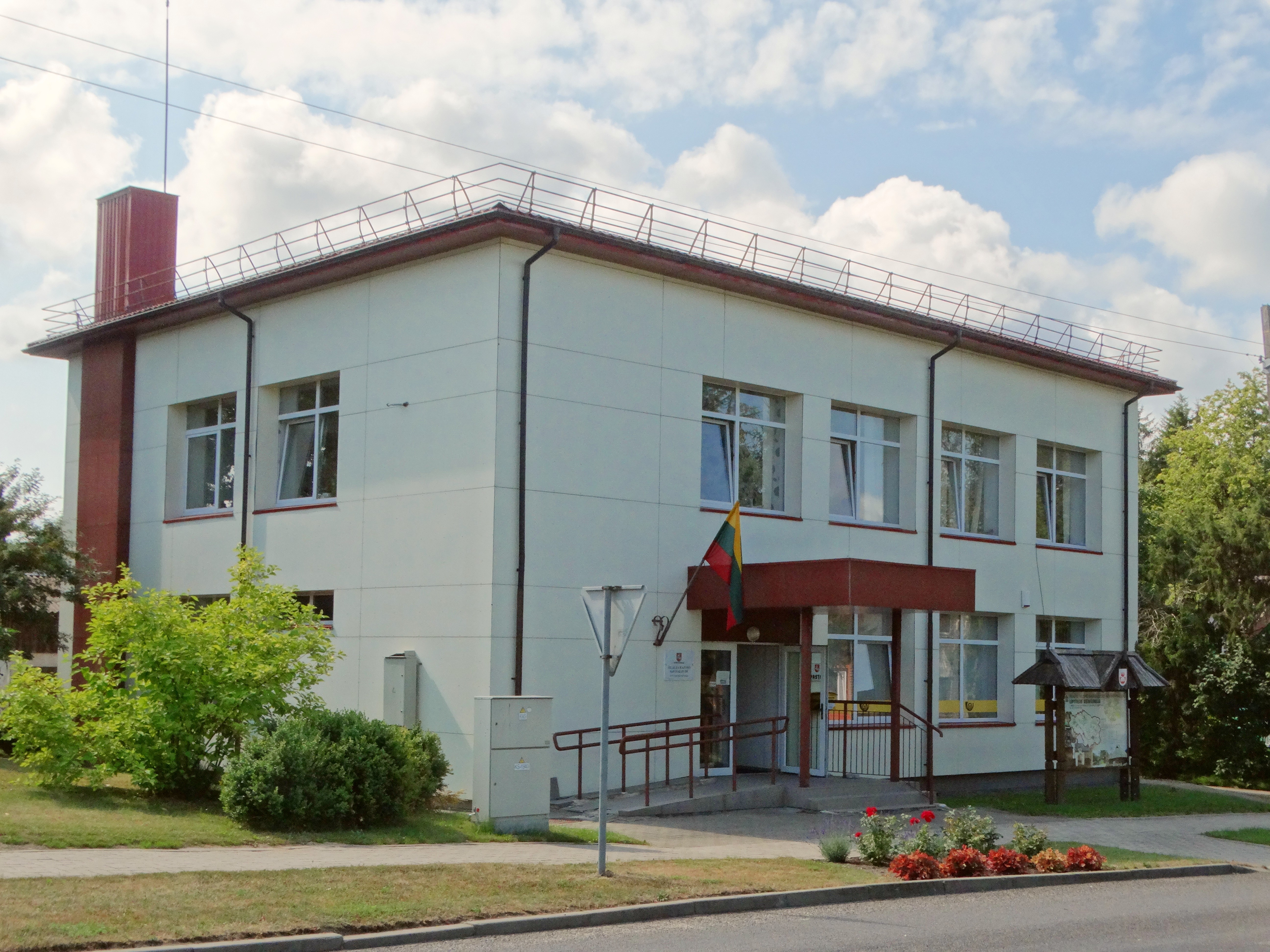
Upyna Eldership, Šilalė district, Lithuania

The Upyna Eldership (Lithuanian: Upynos seniūnija) is an eldership of Lithuania, located in the Šilalė District Municipality. In 2021 its population was 1449.
