= Palentinis Eldership =

Eldership of Lithuania

The Palentinis Eldership (Lithuanian: Palentinio seniūnija) is an eldership of Lithuania, located in the Šilalė District Municipality. In 2021 its population was 230.
