= Laukuva Eldership =

Eldership of Lithuania

The Laukuva Eldership (Lithuanian: Laukuvos seniūnija) is an eldership of Lithuania, located in the Šilalė District Municipality. In 2021 its population was 2497.
