= Bilionys Eldership =

Eldership of Lithuania

The Bilionys Eldership (Lithuanian: Bilionių seniūnija) is an eldership of Lithuania, located in the Šilalė District Municipality. In 2021 its population was 341.
