= Kvėdarna Eldership =

Eldership of Lithuania

The Kvėdarna Eldership (Lithuanian: Kvėdarnos seniūnija) is an eldership of Lithuania, located in the Šilalė District Municipality. In 2021 its population was 2898.
