= Didkiemis Eldership =

Eldership of Lithuania

The Didkiemis Eldership (Lithuanian: Didkiemio seniūnija) is an eldership of Lithuania, located in the Šilalė District Municipality. In 2021 its population was 233.
