= Bijotai Eldership =

Eldership of Lithuania

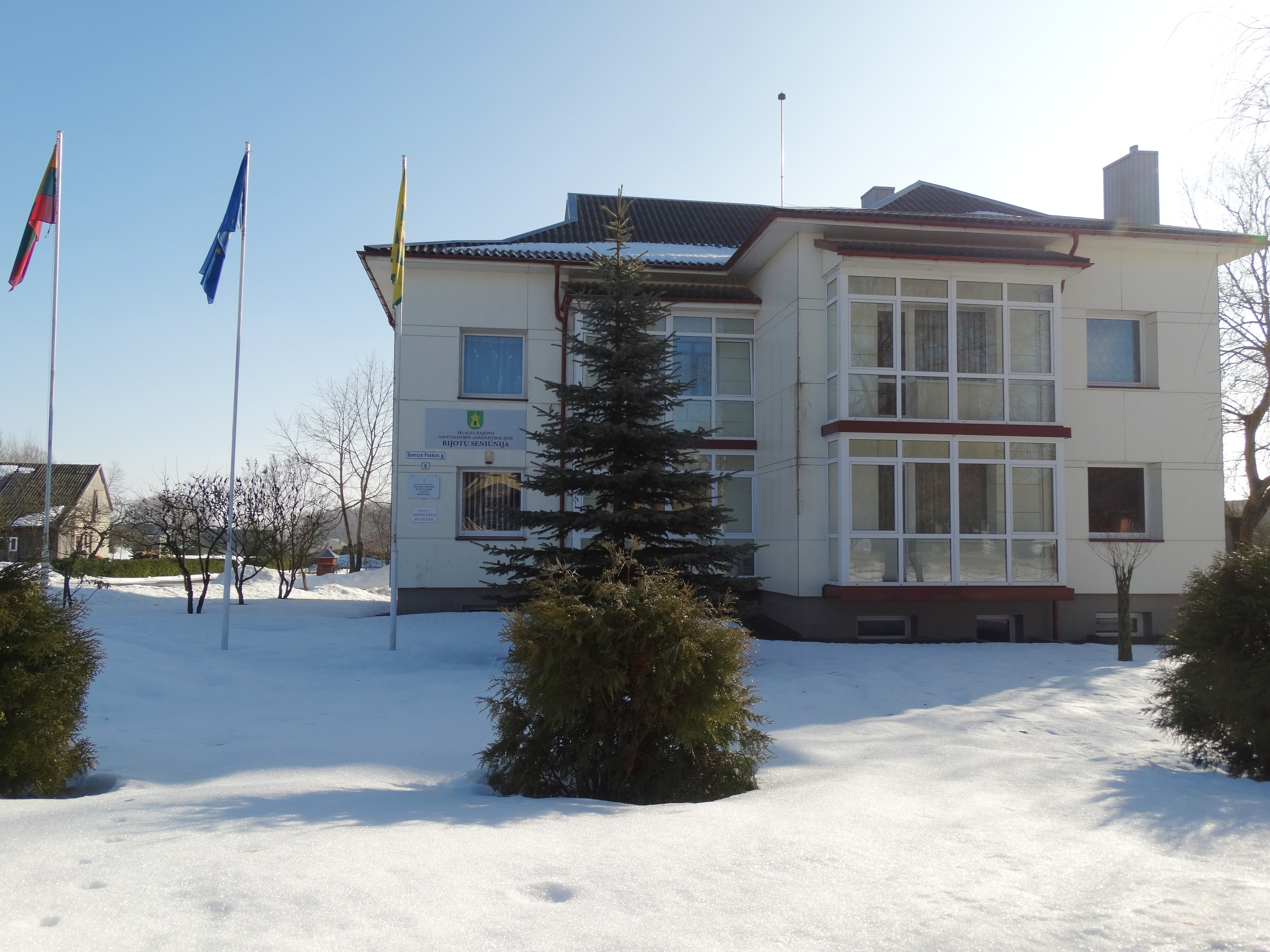
Bijotai eldership

The Bijotai Eldership (Lithuanian: Bijotų seniūnija) is an eldership of Lithuania, located in the Šilalė District Municipality. In 2021 its population was 800.
