= Pajūris Eldership =

Eldership of Lithuania

Location

The Pajūris Eldership (Lithuanian: Pajūrio seniūnija) is an eldership of Lithuania, located in the Šilalė District Municipality. In 2021 its population was 1758.
