= Teneniai Eldership =

Eldership of Lithuania

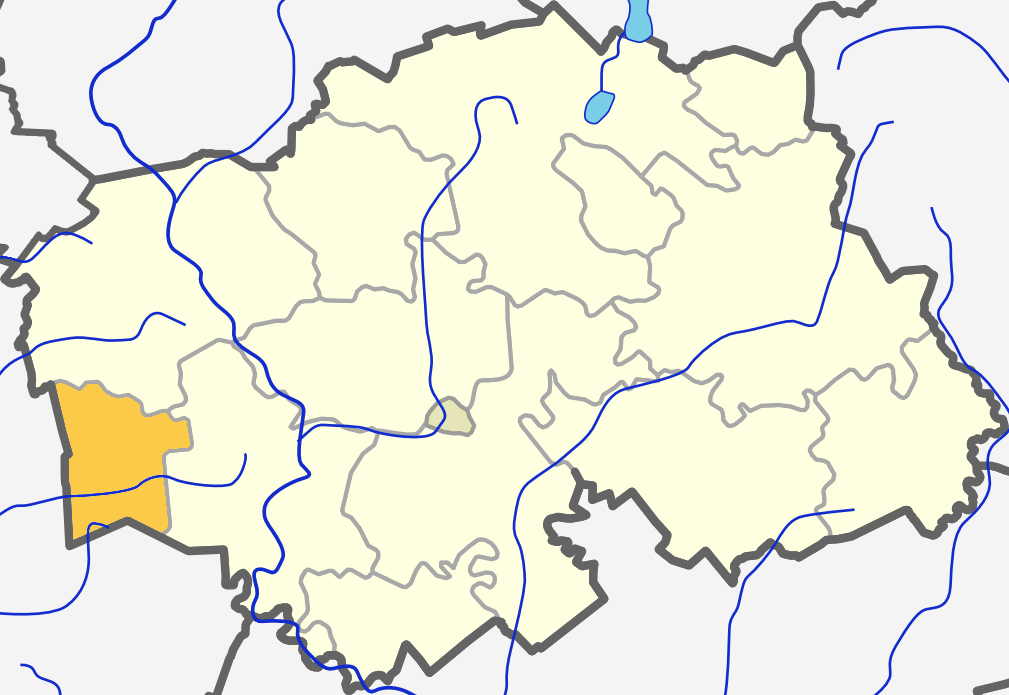

The Teneniai Eldership (Lithuanian: Tenenių seniūnija) is an eldership of Lithuania, located in the Šilalė District Municipality. In 2021 its population was 410.
