= Žvingiai =

- Town
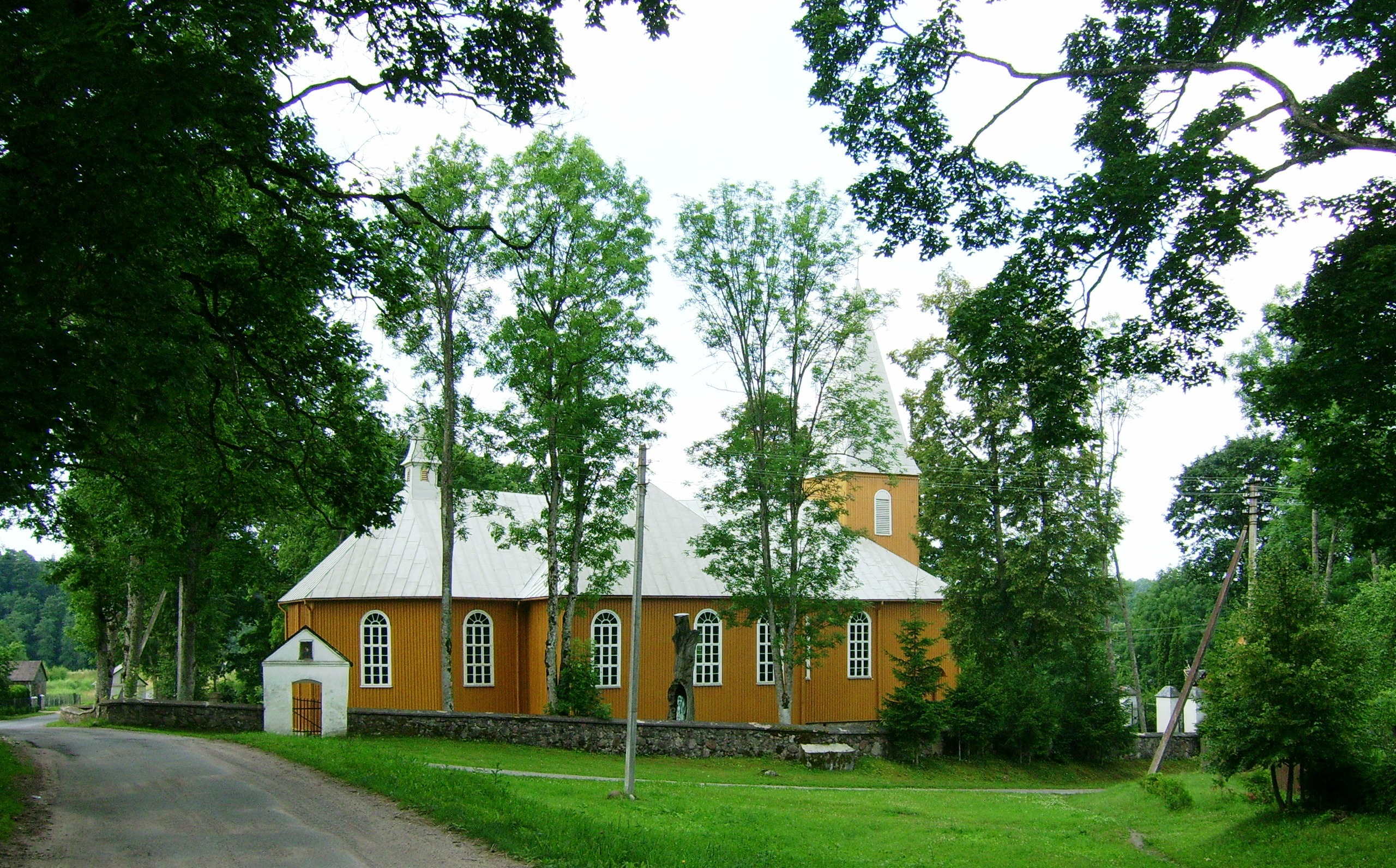

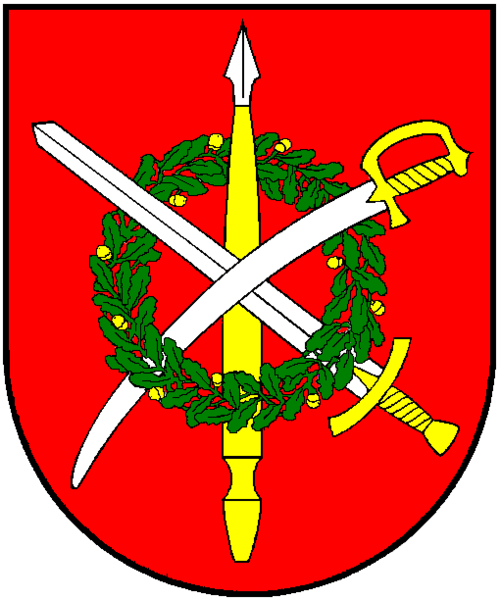
- Seal

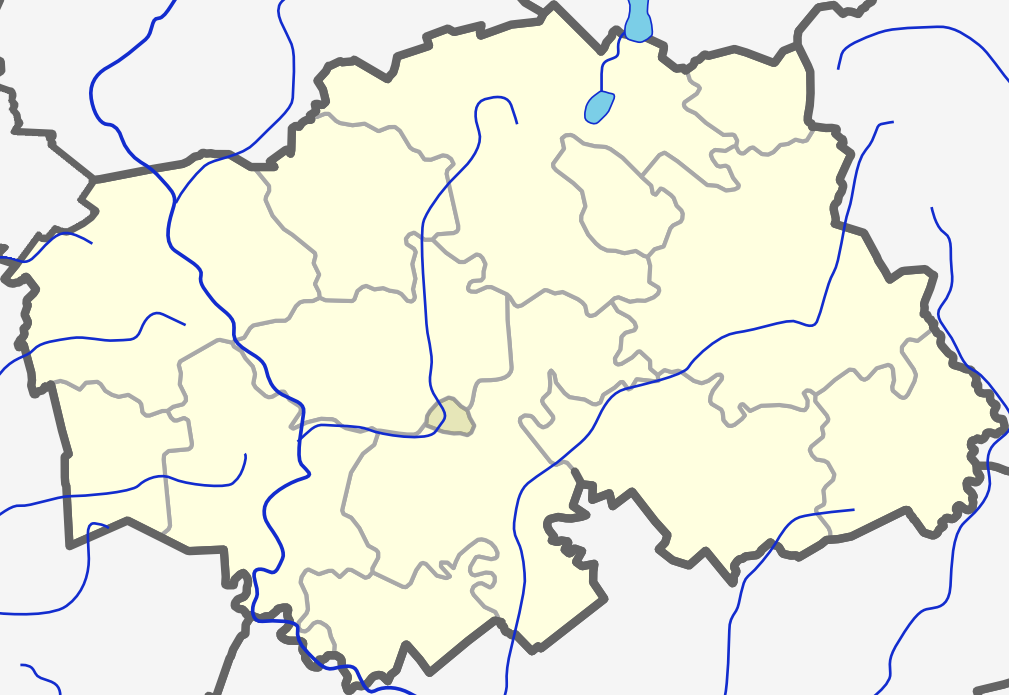
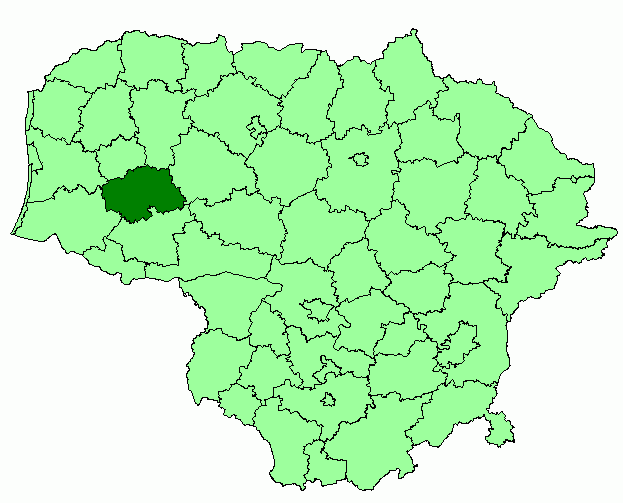
- Location in Šilalė district municipality Location of Šilalė district in Lithuania
- Coordinates: 55°24′00″N 22°01′01″E
- Country: Lithuania
- County: Tauragė
- Municipality: Šilalė
- Eldership: Pajūrio

Population (2011)
  - Total: 195
- Time zone: UTC+2 (EET)
  - Summer (DST): UTC+3 (EEST)

Žvingiai is a town in Šilalė district municipality, Tauragė County, Lithuania. According to the 2011 census, the town has a population of 195 people.

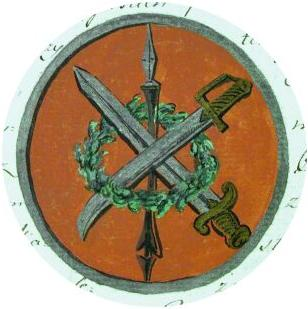
Žvingiai coat of arms (1792)
