= Kaltinėnai Eldership =

Eldership of Lithuania

The Kaltinėnai Eldership (Lithuanian: Kaltinėnų seniūnija) is an eldership of Lithuania, located in the Šilalė District Municipality. In 2021 its population was 1928.
