= Šilalė Rural Eldership =

Eldership of Lithuania

The Šilalė Rural Eldership (Lithuanian: Šilalės kaimiškoji seniūnija) is an eldership of Lithuania, located in the Šilalė District Municipality. In 2021 its population was 2572.
