= Kvėdarna =

- Town
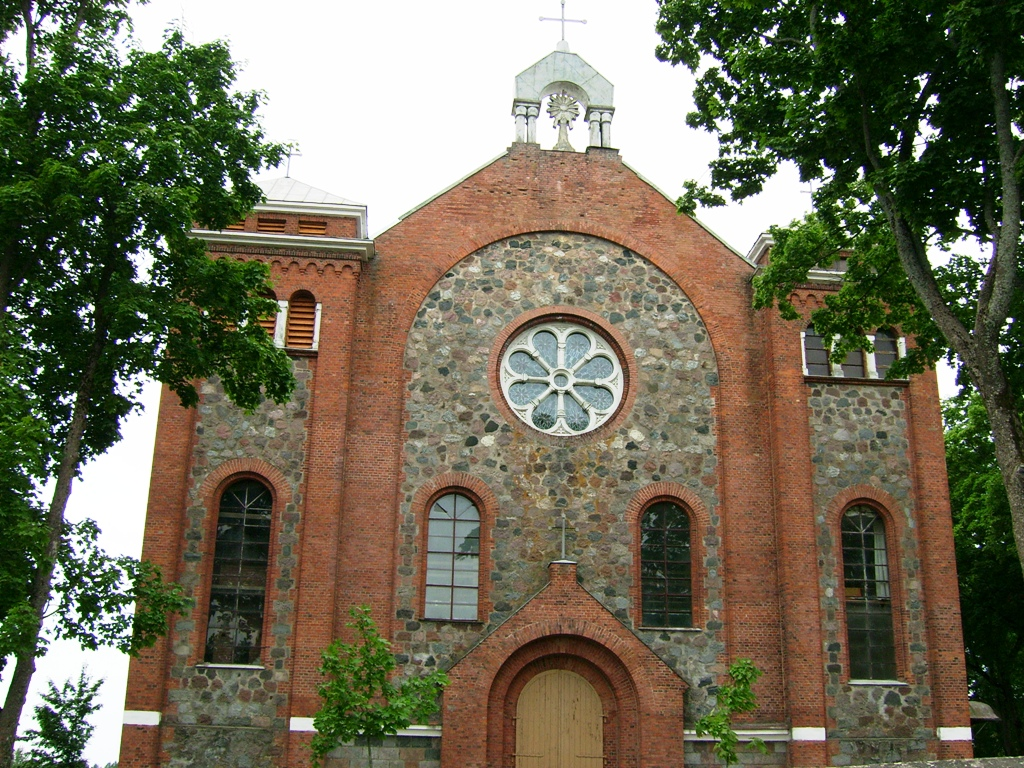

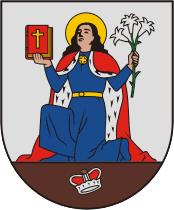
- Coat of arms

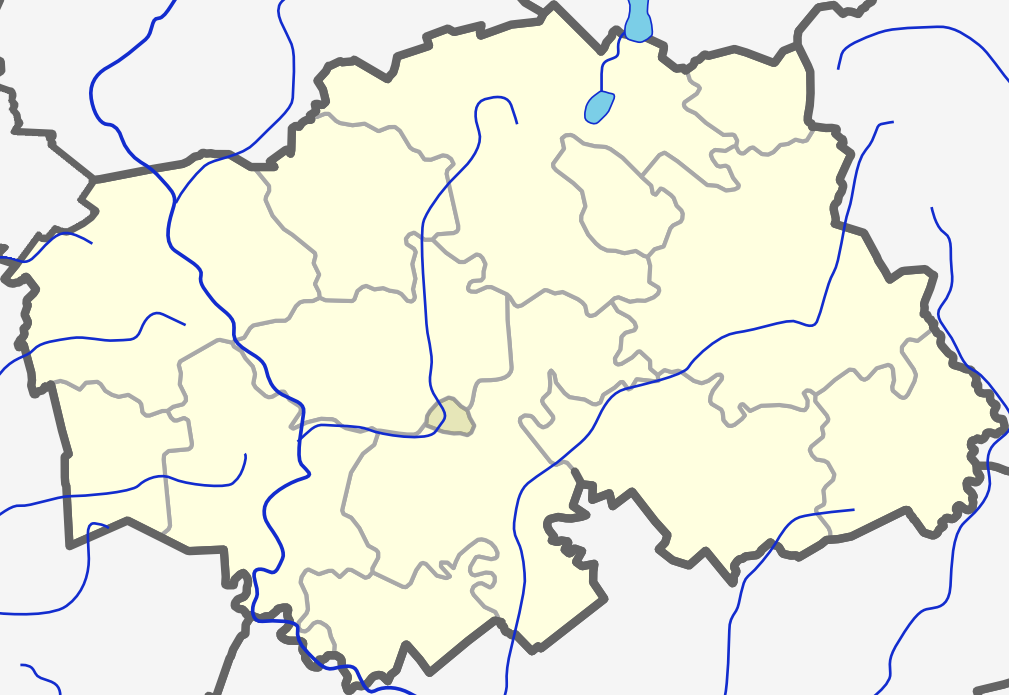
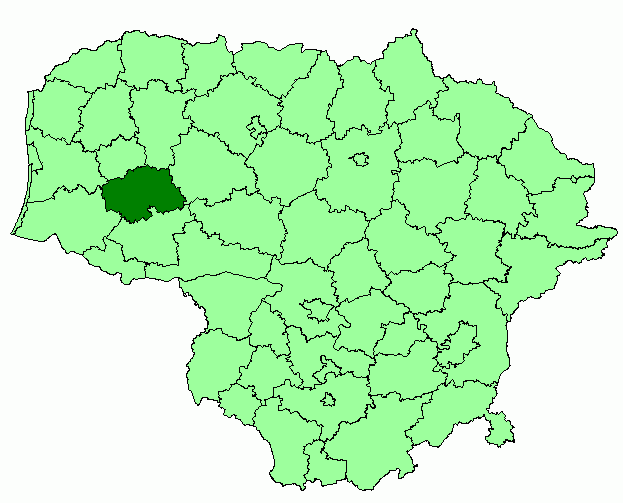
- Location in Šilalė district municipality Location of Šilalė district in Lithuania
- Coordinates: 55°33′20″N 22°00′00″E
- Country: Lithuania
- County: Tauragė
- Municipality: Šilalė
- Eldership: Kvėdarnos

Population (2011)
  - Total: 1,597
- Time zone: UTC+2 (EET)
  - Summer (DST): UTC+3 (EEST)

Kvėdarna (Yiddish: כװידאן) is a town in Šilalė district municipality, Tauragė County, Lithuania.

The etymology of the name is unknown, there are close to no similar words in Lithuanian. The only guess is the name of the river "Kvėdainale" and the hypothetical shift 'i' -> 'r'.

== History ==
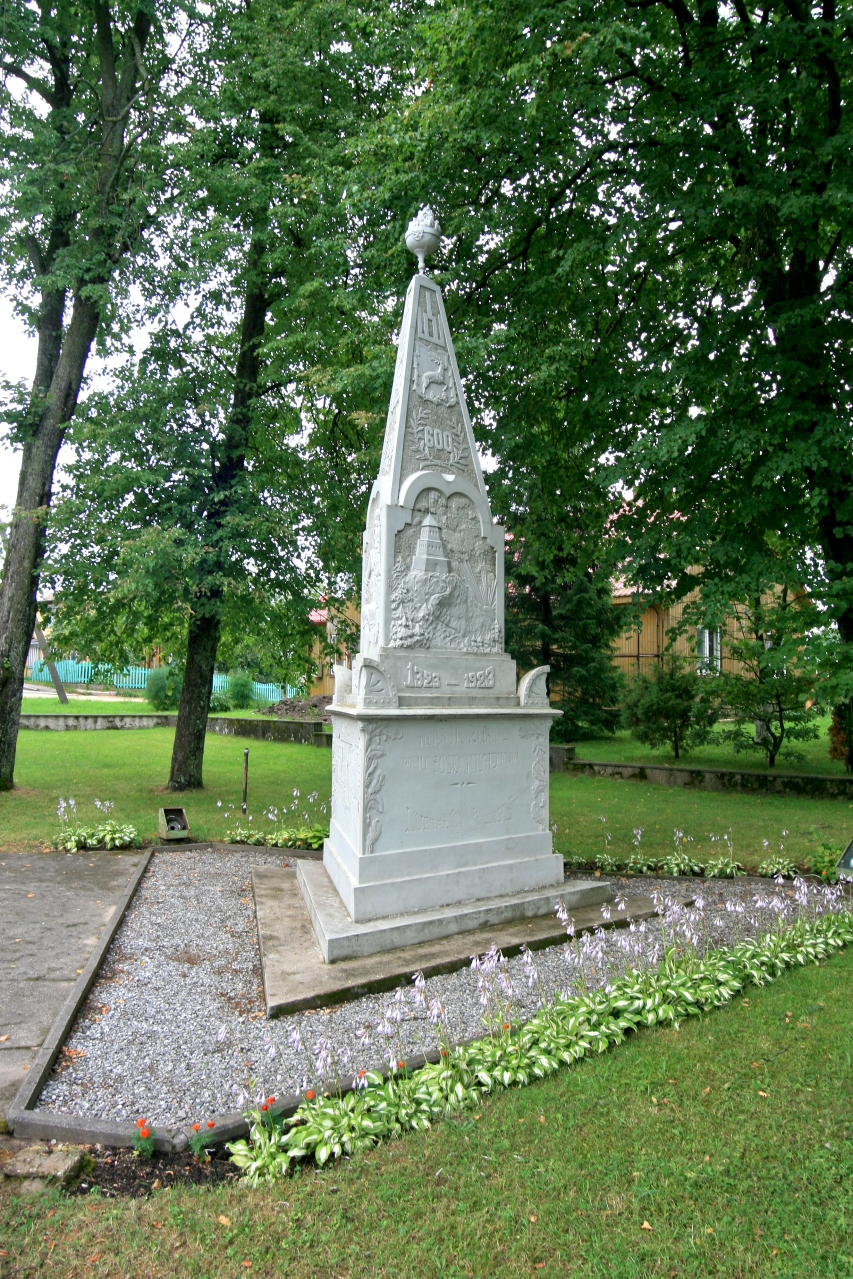
Vytautas the Great Monument

Before World War II, the local Jewish population represented 30% of the total population. During the war, Jews were massacred in a mass execution and others deported in labor camps.

== Population ==
2021 - 1548 people

2011 - 1,597 people

2001 - 1,934 people
