= Teneniai =

- Town
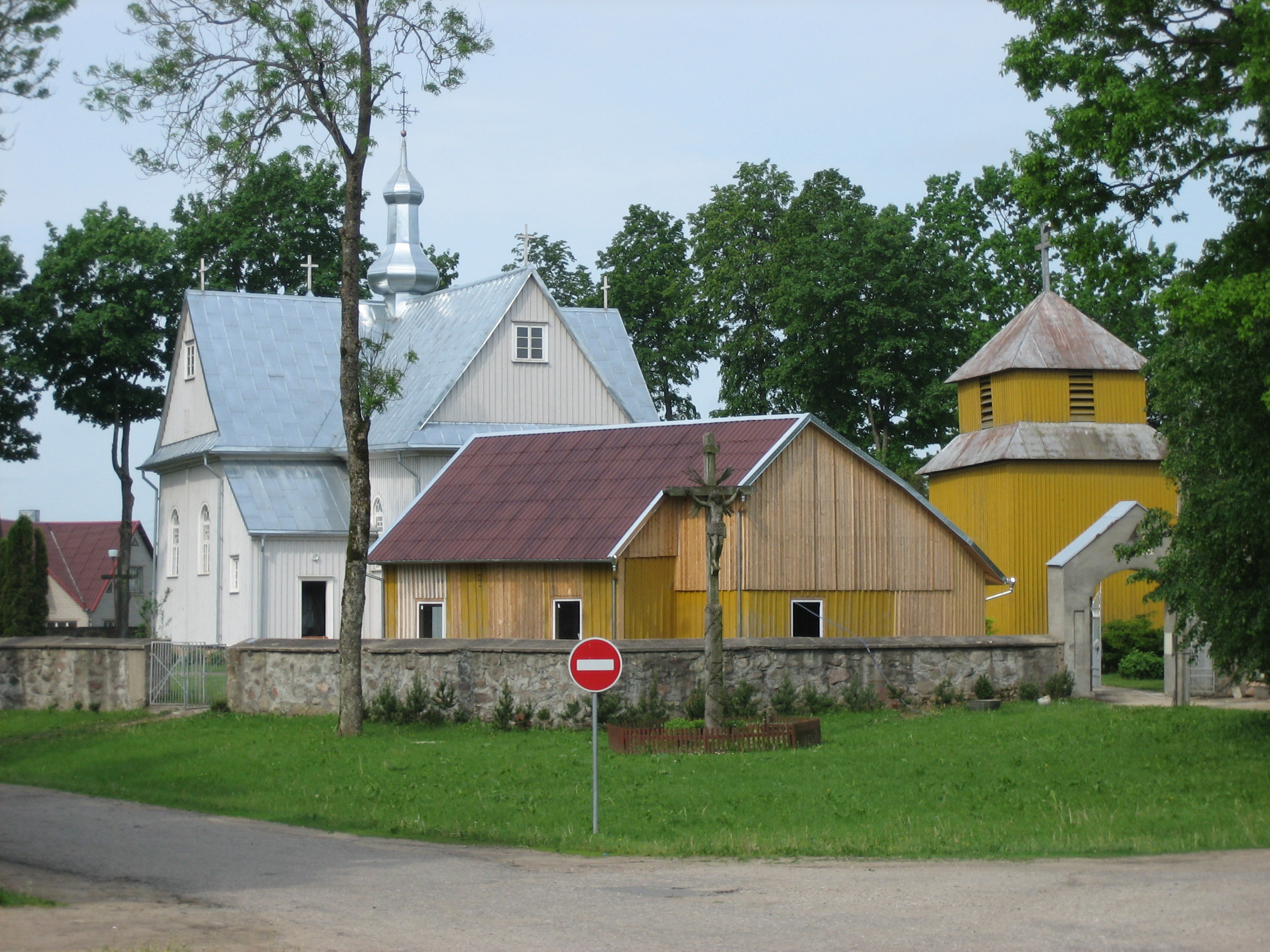

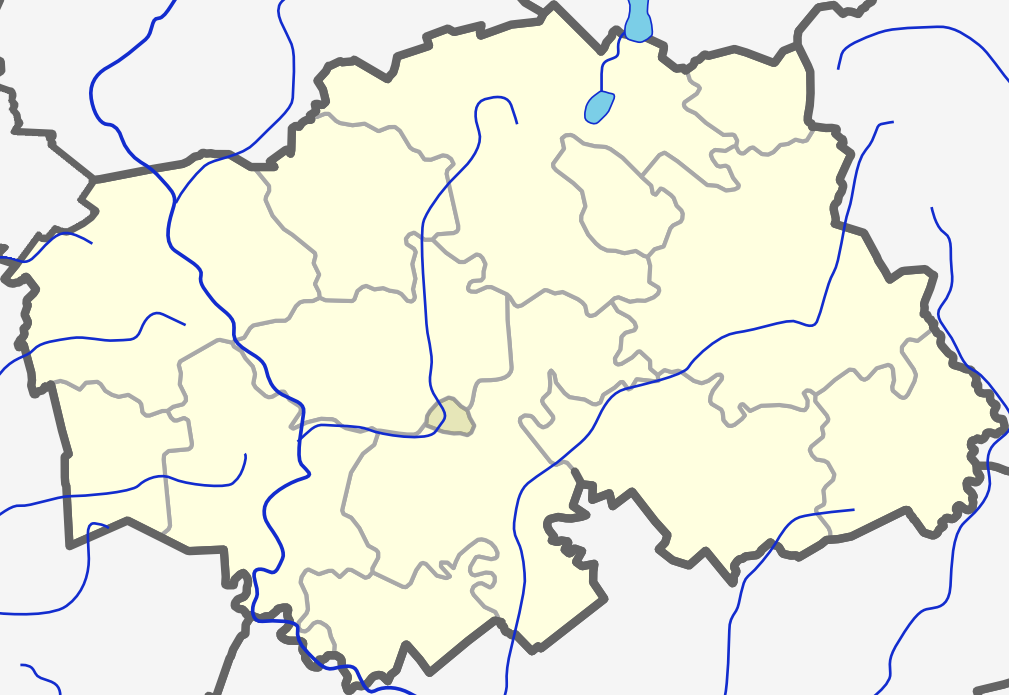
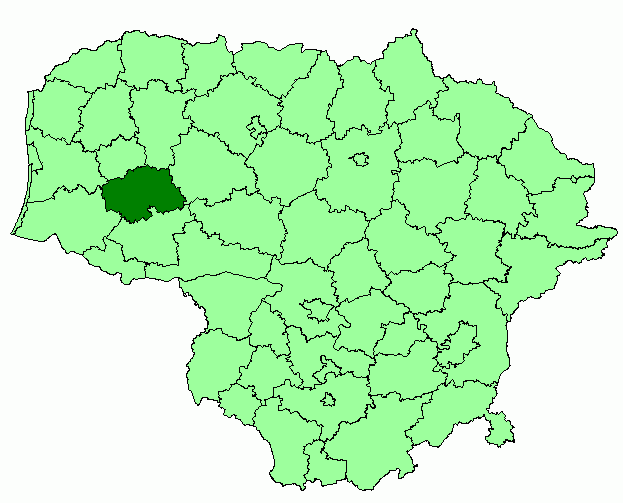
- Location in Šilalė district municipality Location of Šilalė district in Lithuania
- Coordinates: 55°27′40″N 21°54′50″E
- Country: Lithuania
- County: Tauragė
- Municipality: Šilalė
- Eldership: Tenenių

Population (2011)
  - Total: 330
- Time zone: UTC+2 (EET)
  - Summer (DST): UTC+3 (EEST)

Teneniai (Samogitian: Tenenē) is a small town in Šilalė district municipality, Tauragė County, in western Lithuania. According to the 2011 census, the town has a population of 330 people.
