= Laukuva =

- Town
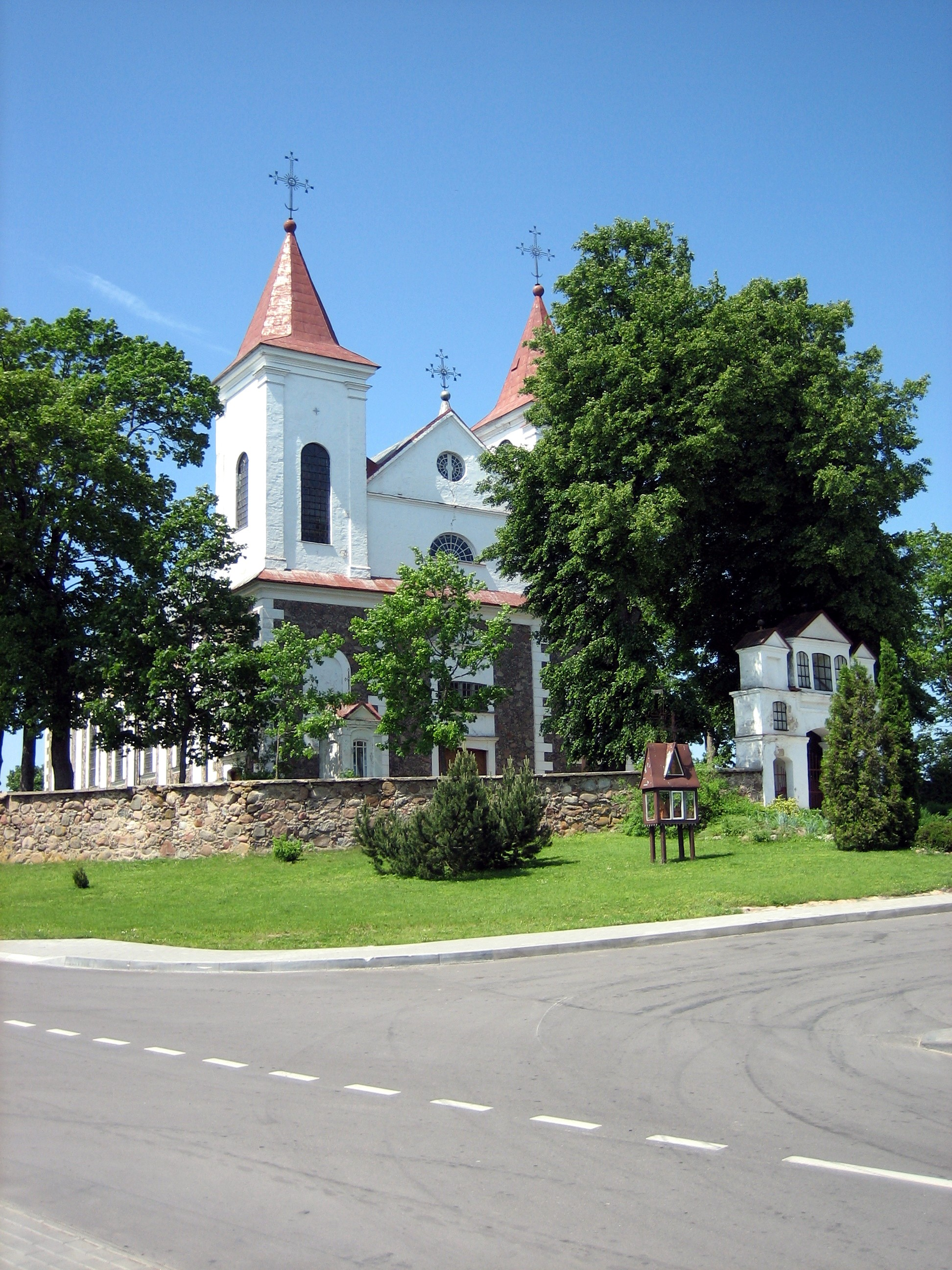

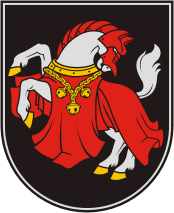
- Coat of arms

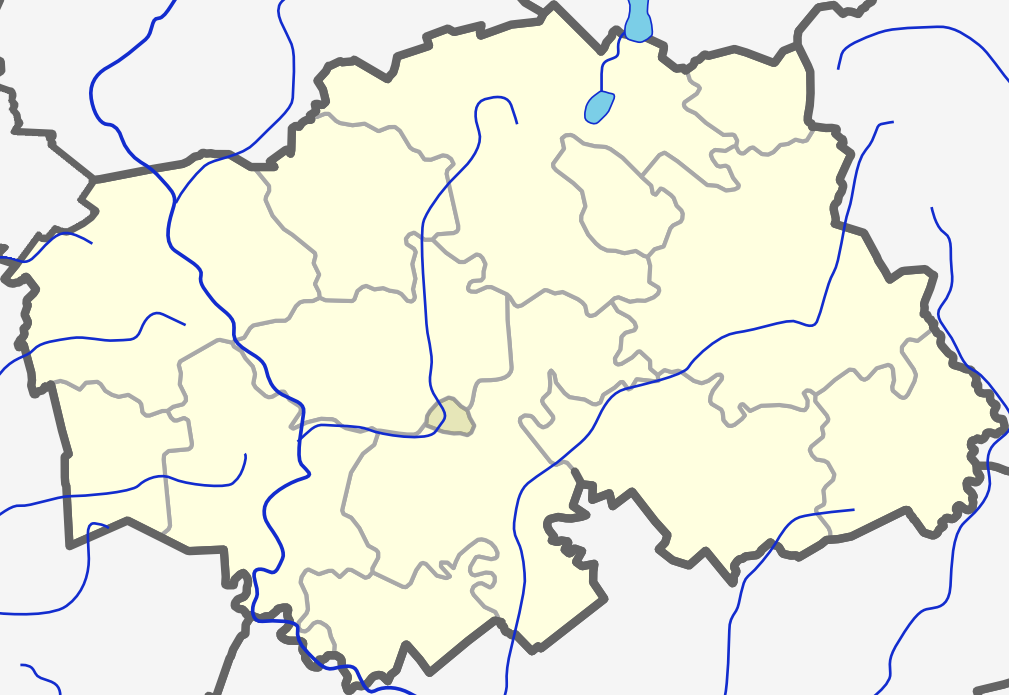
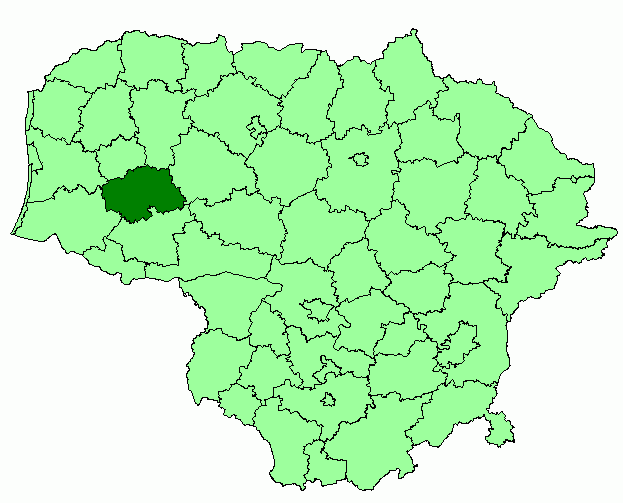
- Location in Šilalė district municipality Location of Šilalė district in Lithuania
- Coordinates: 55°37′10″N 22°14′00″E
- Country: Lithuania
- County: Tauragė
- Municipality: Šilalė
- Eldership: Laukuvos

Population (2011)
  - Total: 832
- Time zone: UTC+02:00 (EET)
  - Summer (DST): UTC+03:00 (EEST)
- Climate: Dfb

Laukuva (Samogitian: Laukova) is a town in Šilalė district municipality, Tauragė County, Lithuania. According to the 2011 census, the town has a population of 832 people.

== Climate ==
Laukuva has a humid continental climate (Köppen Dfb).

Climate data for Laukuva (1991−2020 normals, extremes 1924−1990)
| Month | Jan | Feb | Mar | Apr | May | Jun | Jul | Aug | Sep | Oct | Nov | Dec | Year |
|---|---|---|---|---|---|---|---|---|---|---|---|---|---|
| Record high °C (°F) | 7.7 (45.9) | 13.3 (55.9) | 20.8 (69.4) | 25.4 (77.7) | 31.2 (88.2) | 32.8 (91.0) | 31.7 (89.1) | 32.4 (90.3) | 29.0 (84.2) | 22.8 (73.0) | 16.5 (61.7) | 10.3 (50.5) | 32.8 (91.0) |
| Mean daily maximum °C (°F) | −0.9 (30.4) | −0.3 (31.5) | 3.9 (39.0) | 11.6 (52.9) | 17.3 (63.1) | 20.3 (68.5) | 22.6 (72.7) | 21.8 (71.2) | 16.7 (62.1) | 10.1 (50.2) | 4.3 (39.7) | 0.5 (32.9) | 10.7 (51.3) |
| Daily mean °C (°F) | −3.2 (26.2) | −2.9 (26.8) | 0.3 (32.5) | 6.4 (43.5) | 11.6 (52.9) | 14.9 (58.8) | 17.4 (63.3) | 16.6 (61.9) | 12.1 (53.8) | 6.7 (44.1) | 2.1 (35.8) | −1.4 (29.5) | 6.7 (44.1) |
| Mean daily minimum °C (°F) | −5.5 (22.1) | −5.4 (22.3) | −2.8 (27.0) | 1.8 (35.2) | 6.1 (43.0) | 9.9 (49.8) | 12.6 (54.7) | 12.0 (53.6) | 8.1 (46.6) | 3.8 (38.8) | 0.1 (32.2) | −3.5 (25.7) | 3.1 (37.6) |
| Record low °C (°F) | −36.9 (−34.4) | −35.6 (−32.1) | −26.1 (−15.0) | −13.3 (8.1) | −3.5 (25.7) | −1.2 (29.8) | 3.6 (38.5) | 1.4 (34.5) | −3.2 (26.2) | −10.1 (13.8) | −22.6 (−8.7) | −27.0 (−16.6) | −36.9 (−34.4) |
| Average precipitation mm (inches) | 68 (2.7) | 50 (2.0) | 46 (1.8) | 38 (1.5) | 47 (1.9) | 67 (2.6) | 85 (3.3) | 90 (3.5) | 69 (2.7) | 85 (3.3) | 75 (3.0) | 69 (2.7) | 789 (31.1) |
| Average relative humidity (%) | 89 | 87 | 82 | 74 | 72 | 76 | 78 | 80 | 84 | 87 | 91 | 91 | 83 |
Source 1: Lithuanian Hydrometeorological Service
Source 2: NOAA (extremes)
