= Trakas =

Trakas (Greek: Τράκας) is a Greek surname. Notable people with the surname include:

- George Trakas (born 1944), Canadian-American sculptor
- Jim Trakas (born 1965), American politician
- Sotirios Trakas (born 1987), Greek Olympic diver
