= Museum of Science and Industry in Kraków =

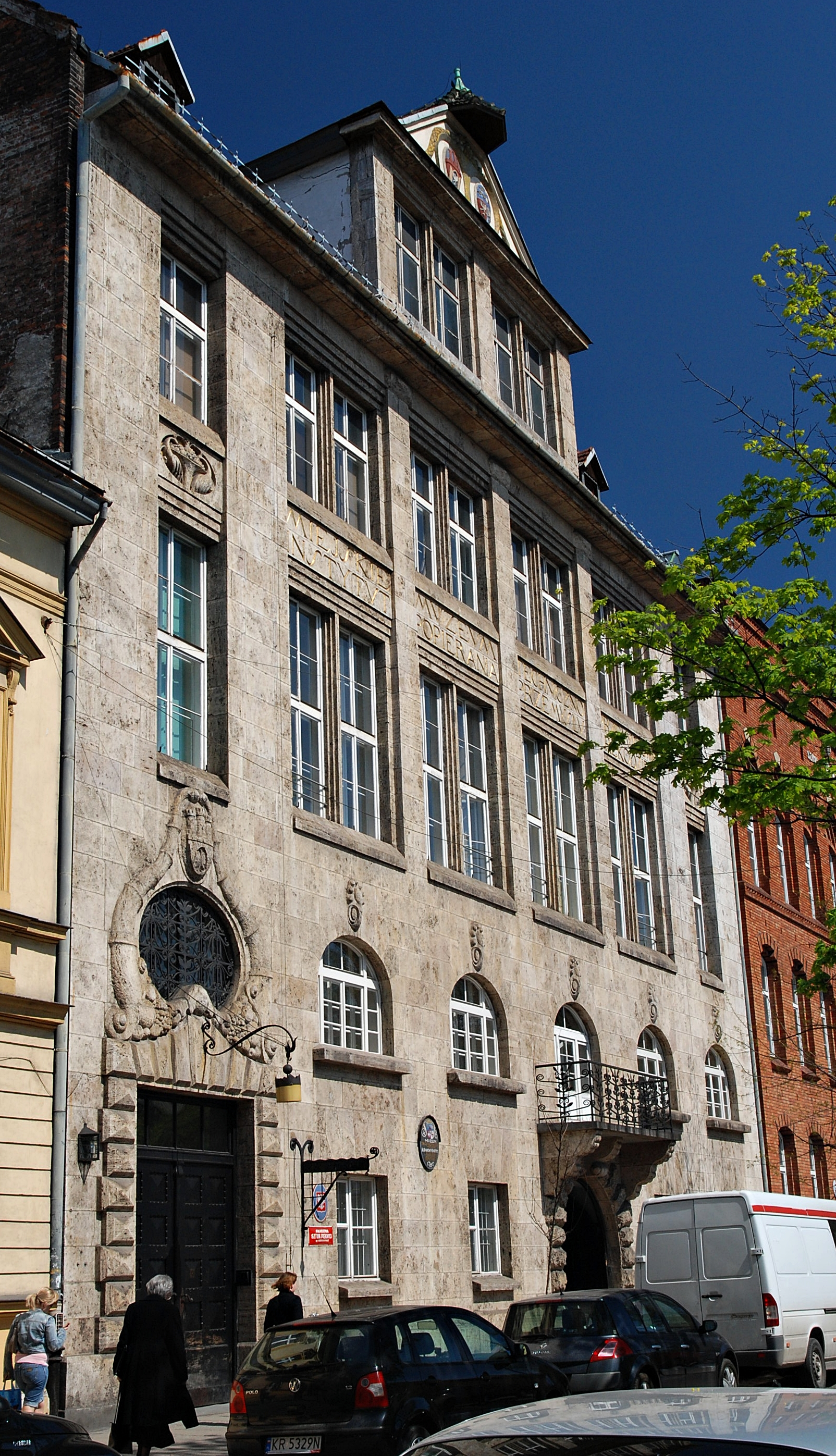
The museum building in 2009

Museum of Science and Industry in Kraków (Polish: Muzeum Techniczno-Przemysłowe w Krakowie) was a museum in Kraków, Poland. It was established in 1868, at the initiative of Adrian Baraniecki, a Polish physician and social activist.

The museum was founded with the goal of popularizing technical knowledge and promoting industry. It was initially located in the building of the Jagiellonian University. In 1871, it moved to a building on Św. Jana Street, and in 1879 it was relocated to a building on Smoleńsk Street, where it remained until its closure.

Its name changed in 1920 to the Museum of Industry and Technology (Muzeum Przemysłu i Techniki), and again in 1934 to the Museum of Industry and Agriculture (Muzeum Przemysłu i Rolnictwa).

The museum's collection included models of machines, tools, and devices used in various industries, as well as products of domestic crafts and folk art. It also had a library and organized lectures and exhibitions.

The museum was nationalized in 1950, and became part of the National Museum, Kraków. The building presently serves as the library of the Jan Matejko Academy of Fine Arts ("ASP").
