= Girsteikiai =

- Village
- Location within Lithuania
- Coordinates: 56.008°N 25.007°E
- Country: Lithuania
- County: Panevėžys County

Population
  - Total: 63
- Time zone: Eastern European Time (UTC+2)
  - Summer (DST): Eastern European Summer Time (UTC+3)

Girsteikiai is a village in Kupiškis District Municipality, Panevėžys County, Lithuania. The population was 63 in 2011.
