= Traksėdis Eldership =

Eldership of Lithuania

The Traksėdis Eldership (Lithuanian: Traksėdžio seniūnija) is an eldership of Lithuania, located in the Šilalė District Municipality. In 2021 its population was 1540.
