= Upyna =

- Town
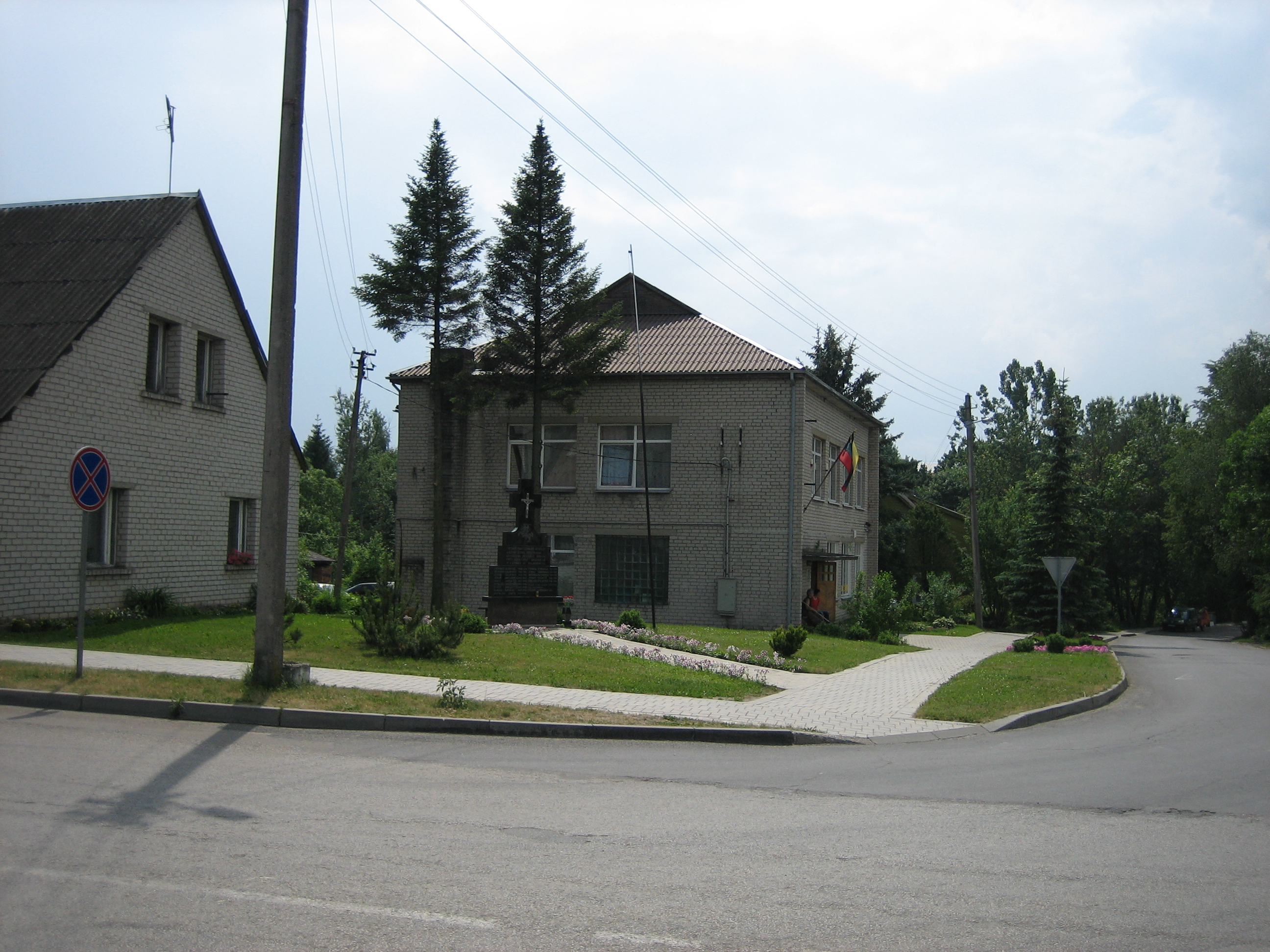

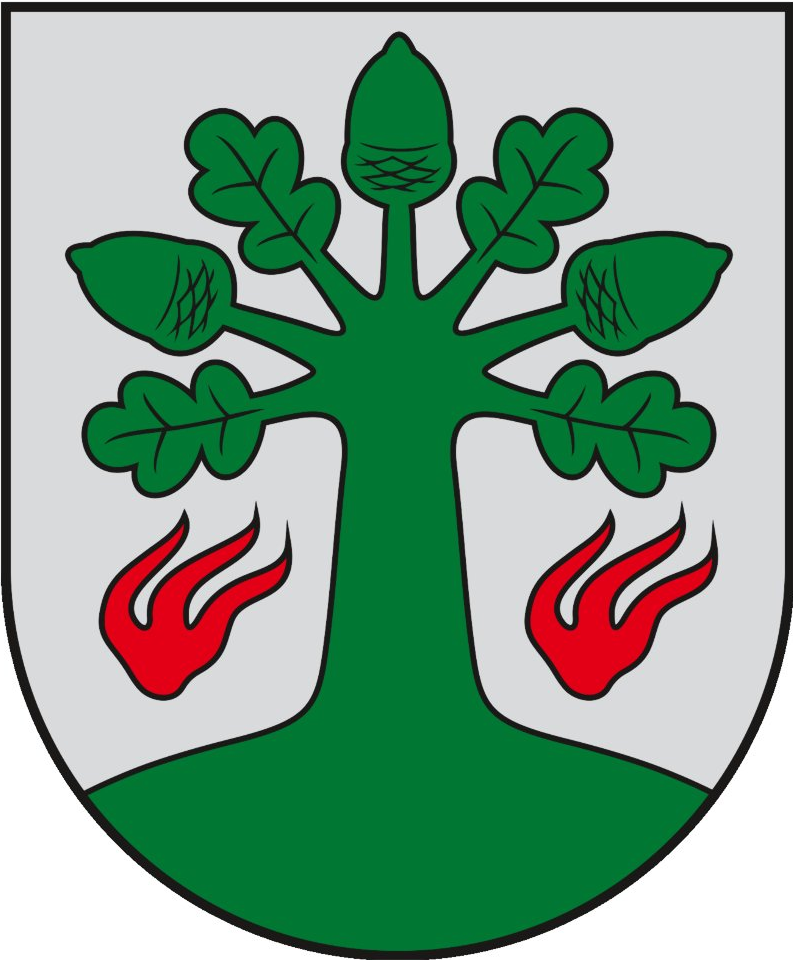
- Coat of arms

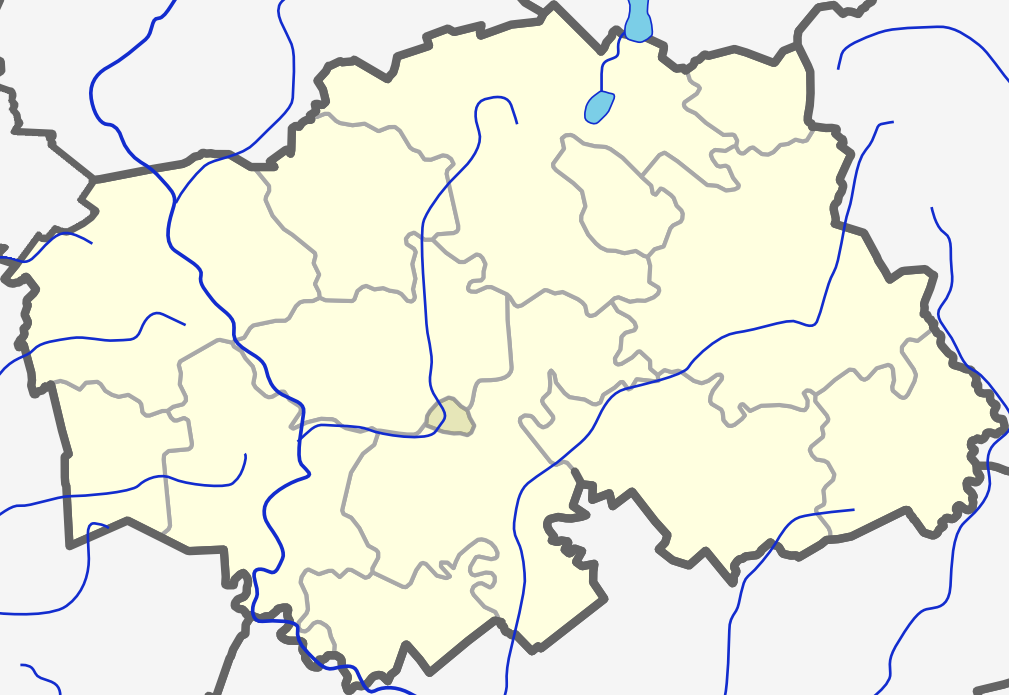
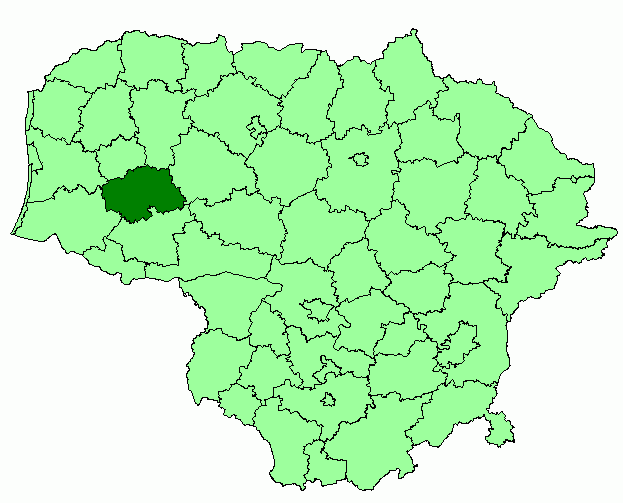
- Location in Šilalė district municipality Location of Šilalė district in Lithuania
- Coordinates: 55°27′00″N 22°26′20″E
- Country: Lithuania
- County: Tauragė
- Municipality: Šilalė
- Eldership: Upynos

Population (2011)
  - Total: 375
- Time zone: UTC+2 (EET)
  - Summer (DST): UTC+3 (EEST)

Upyna (Polish: Upina, Samogitian: Opīna) is a small town in Šilalė district municipality, Tauragė County, in western Lithuania. According to the 2011 census, the town has a population of 375 people.

== History ==
In 1941, 100 Jews were massacred in a mass execution by an Einsatzgruppen. There is a small memorial at the execution site.

== Gallery ==
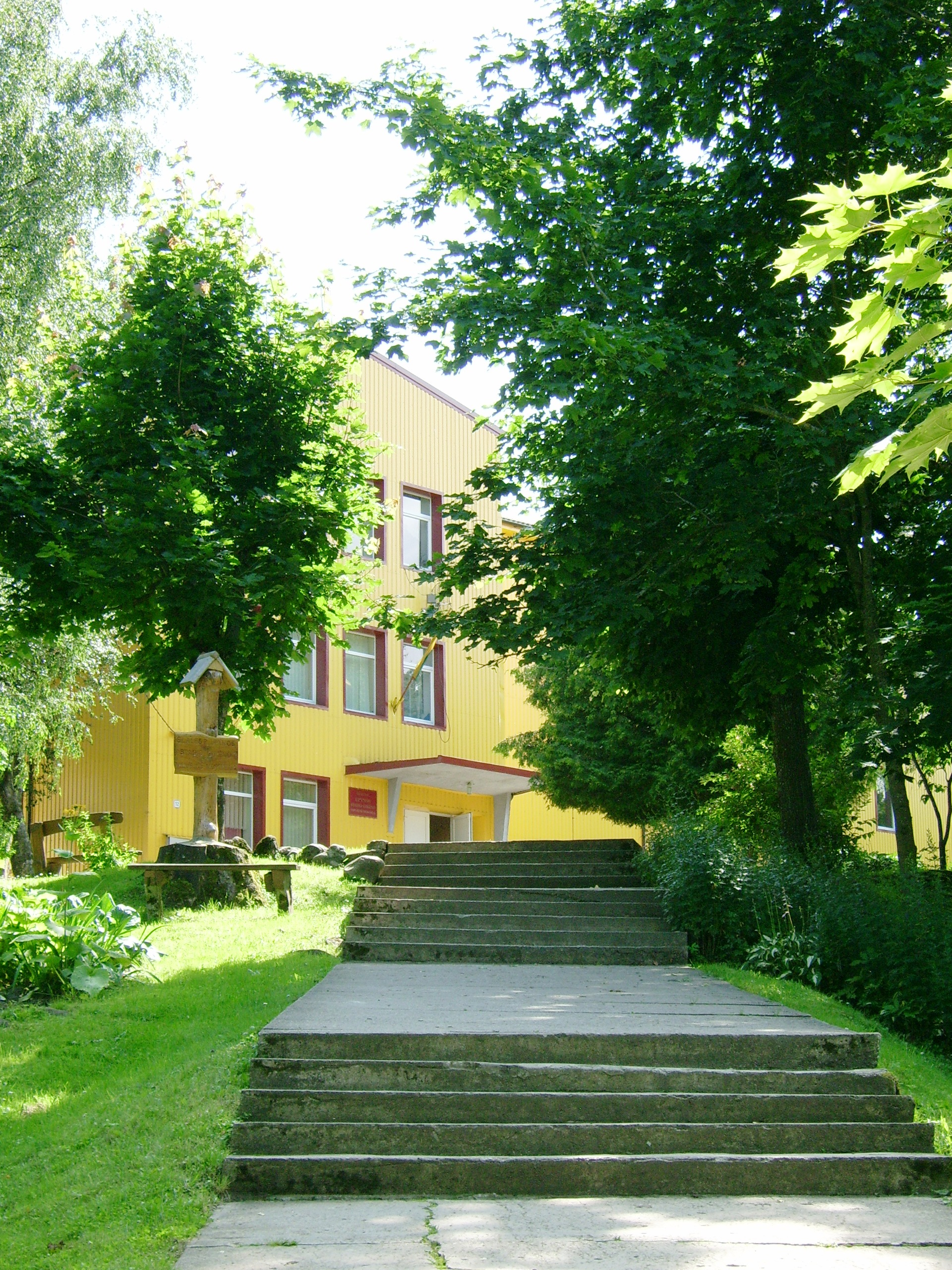
School

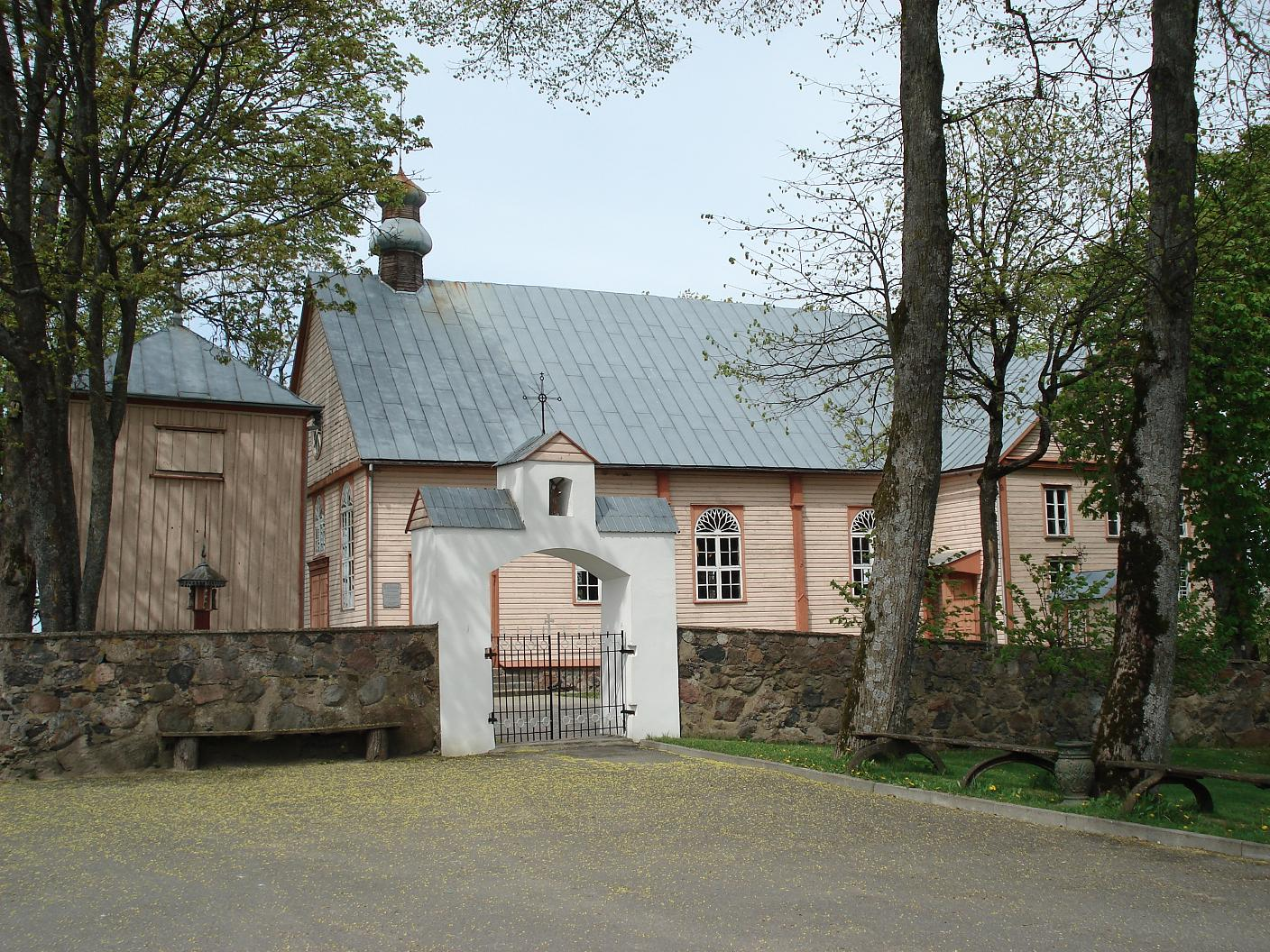
Church
