= Bazilionai =

- Town
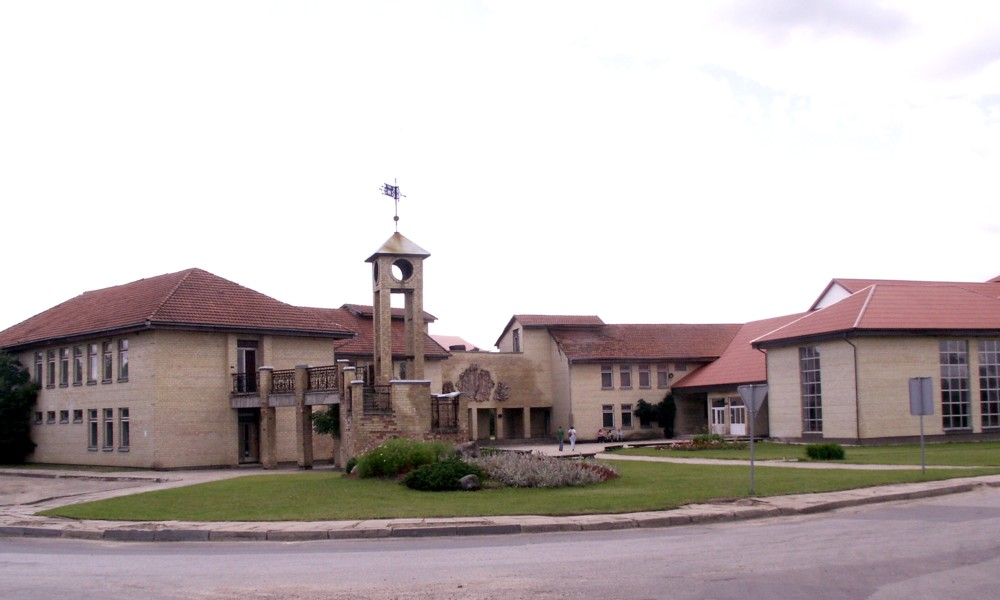
- Bazilionai town centre

- Coat of arms

- Location in Lithuania
- Coordinates: 55°47′40″N 23°08′20″E
- Country: Lithuania
- Ethnographic region: Samogitia
- County: Šiauliai County
- Municipality: Šiauliai district municipality
- Eldership: Bubiai eldership

Population (2021)
  - Total: 302
- Time zone: UTC+2 (EET)
  - Summer (DST): UTC+3 (EEST)

Bazilionai is a small town in Šiauliai County in northern-central Lithuania. It is situated on the bank of the Dubysa River about 2 kilometres (1.2 mi) of the road connecting Šiauliai with Sovetsk (former trade route to Tilsit).

== Demographics ==
According to the 2011 census, Bazilionai had a population of 390 people. A decade later, the 2021 census, showed a population of 302 residents, reflecting a 2.6% average annual decrease. The town covers an area of 1.89 km², resulting in a population density of approximately 159.9 people per square kilometer. The population is relatively balanced by gender, with women making up 50.3% (152 individuals) and men accounting for 49.7% (150 individuals).

== History ==
In 1744, King Augustus III granted a privilege to organize regular fairs in the town. Before monks of the Order of Saint Basil the Great arrived to the town in 1749, it was known as Padubysys (literally: near Dubysa).

The Basilian Fathers established a parish school in 1773. After 20 years, the school had 192 students and was reorganized into six-year school. The monastery and school was closed by the Tsarist authorities after the failed uprising in 1830. The church was transformed into an Eastern Orthodox one. After Lithuania regained independence in 1919, the church was reformed back to a Catholic one.

Before World War II, the Jewish community of the village had 130 members. All of them were murdered in a mass execution perpetrated by an einsatzgruppen of Germans and Lithuanian nationalists in 1941. According to local testimony, Lithuanian partisans registered the Jews and arrested them in their homes, knowing exactly who they were and how many children each family had. The Jews were confined either in the synagogue and nearby houses or possibly in a brick factory that served as a temporary ghetto. During this time, some were robbed and a few killed by local collaborators. After the arrests, their homes were taken over by others, and Jewish belongings were collected and sold in a barn over the course of a month. One house was repurposed as the office of the local administration.
