= Pajūris =

- Town
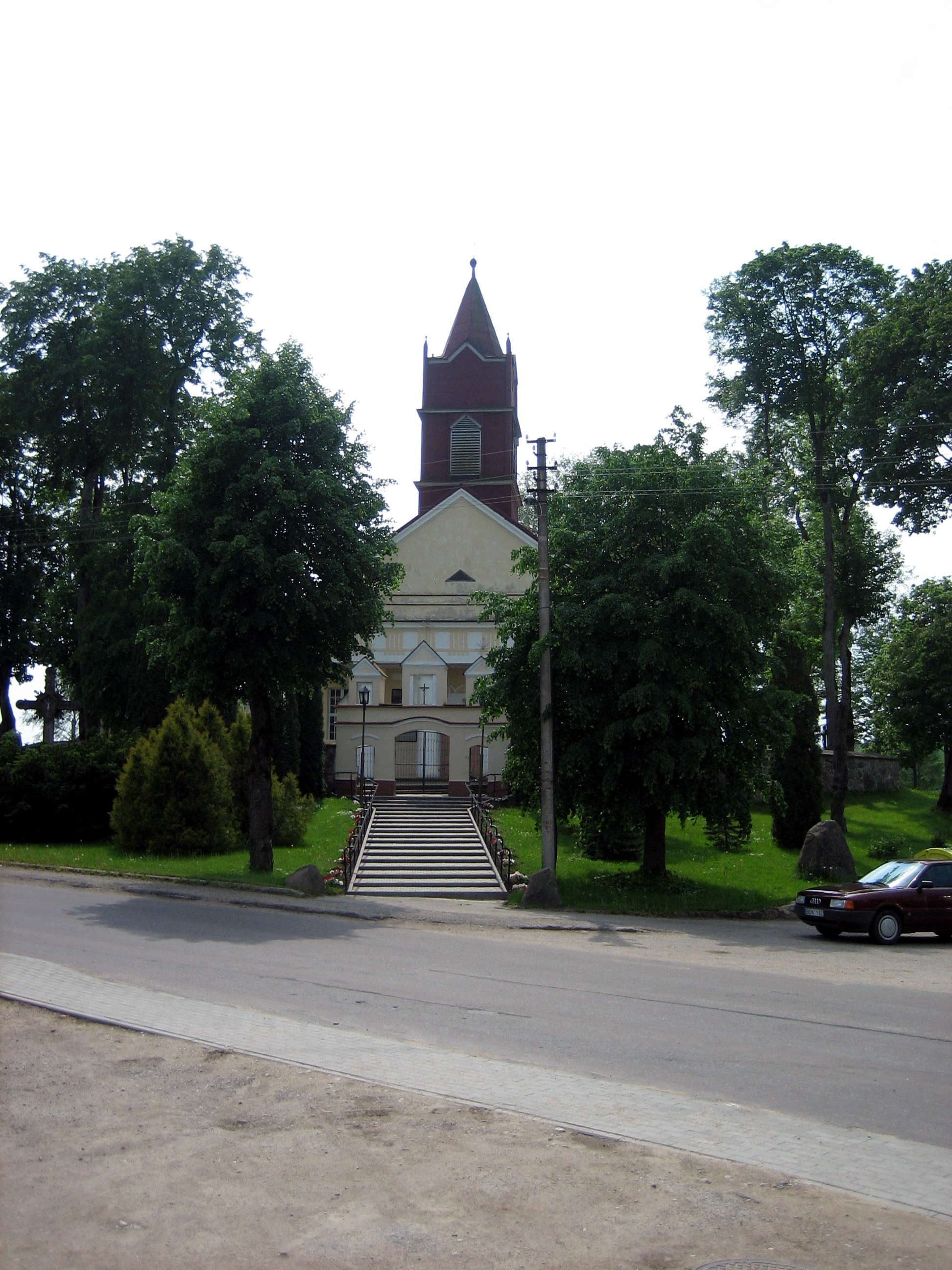

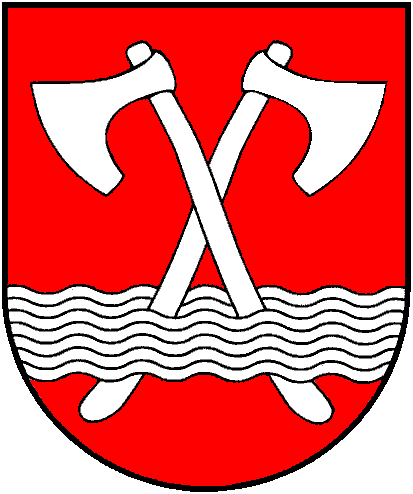
- Coat of arms

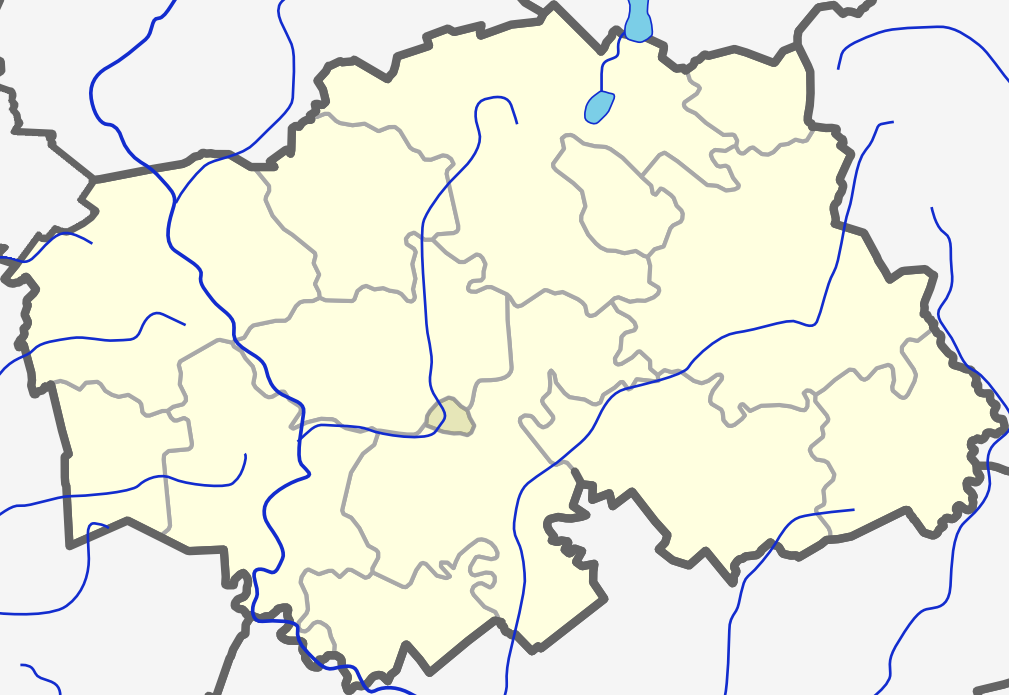
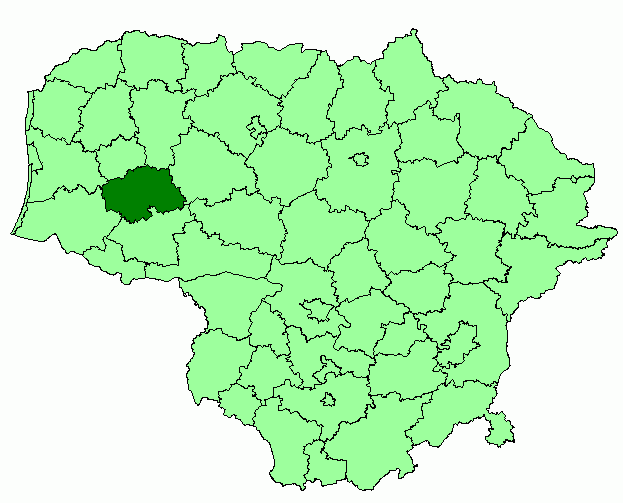
- Location in Šilalė district municipality Location of Šilalė district in Lithuania
- Coordinates: 55°26′40″N 22°01′40″E
- Country: Lithuania
- County: Tauragė
- Municipality: Šilalė
- Eldership: Pajūrio

Population (2011)
  - Total: 784
- Time zone: UTC+2 (EET)
  - Summer (DST): UTC+3 (EEST)

Pajūris is a small town in Šilalė district municipality, Tauragė County, in western Lithuania. According to the 2011 census, the town has a population of 784 people.

== Gallery ==
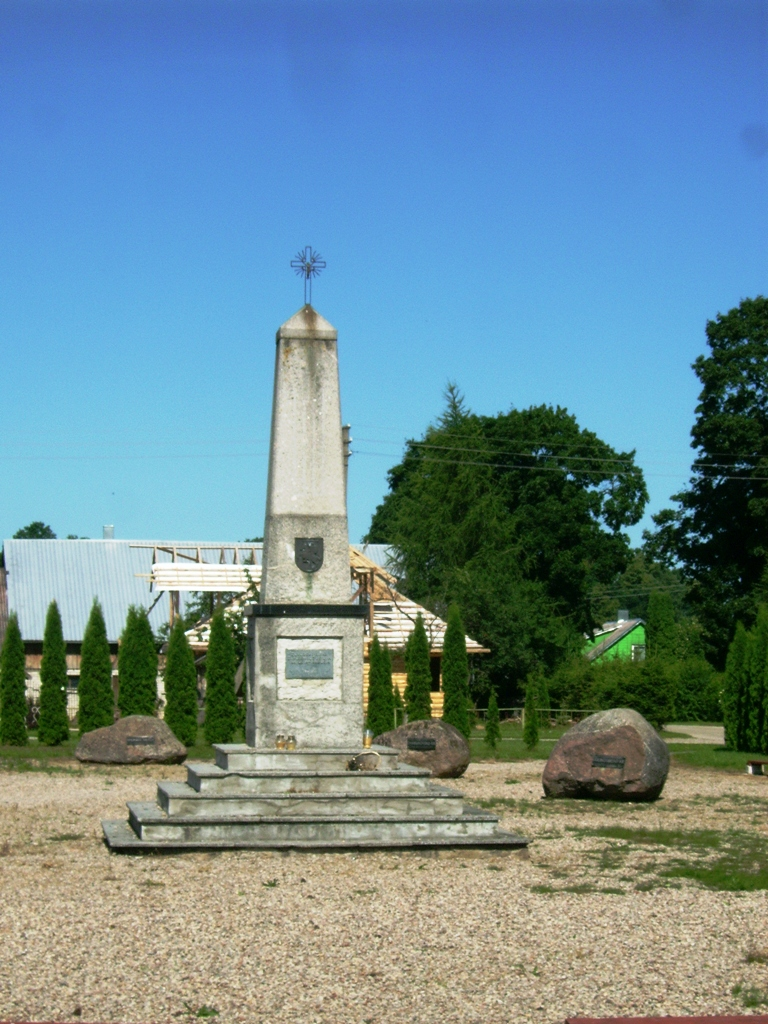
Obelisk dedicated to exiles

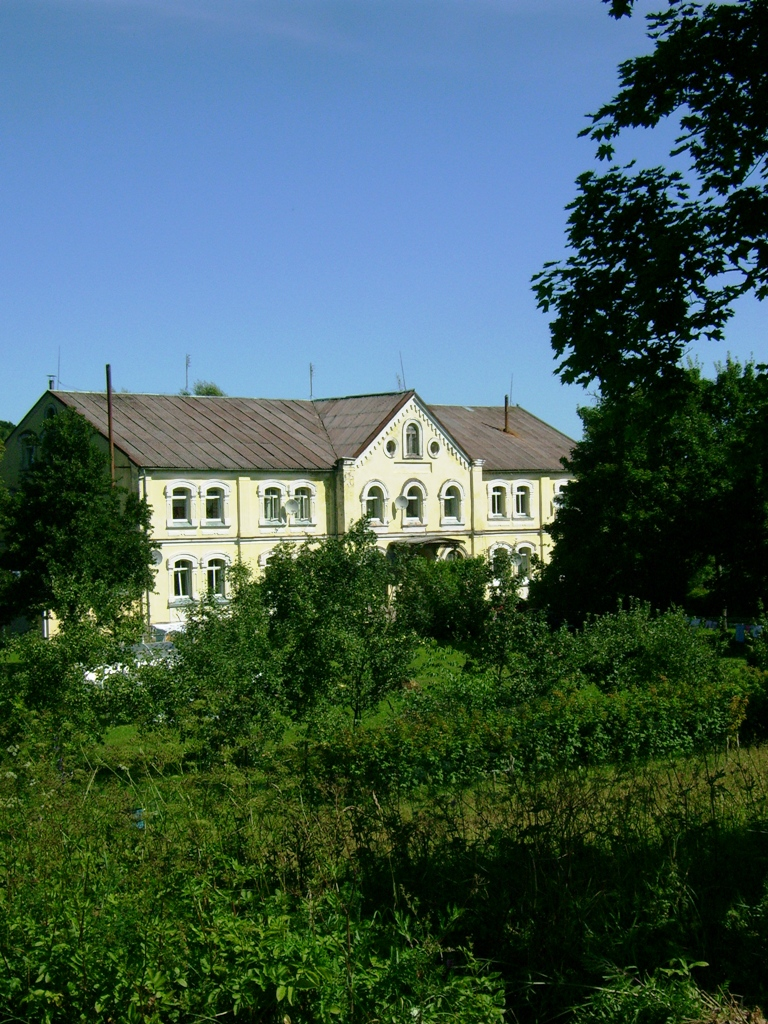
Former franciscan monastery building

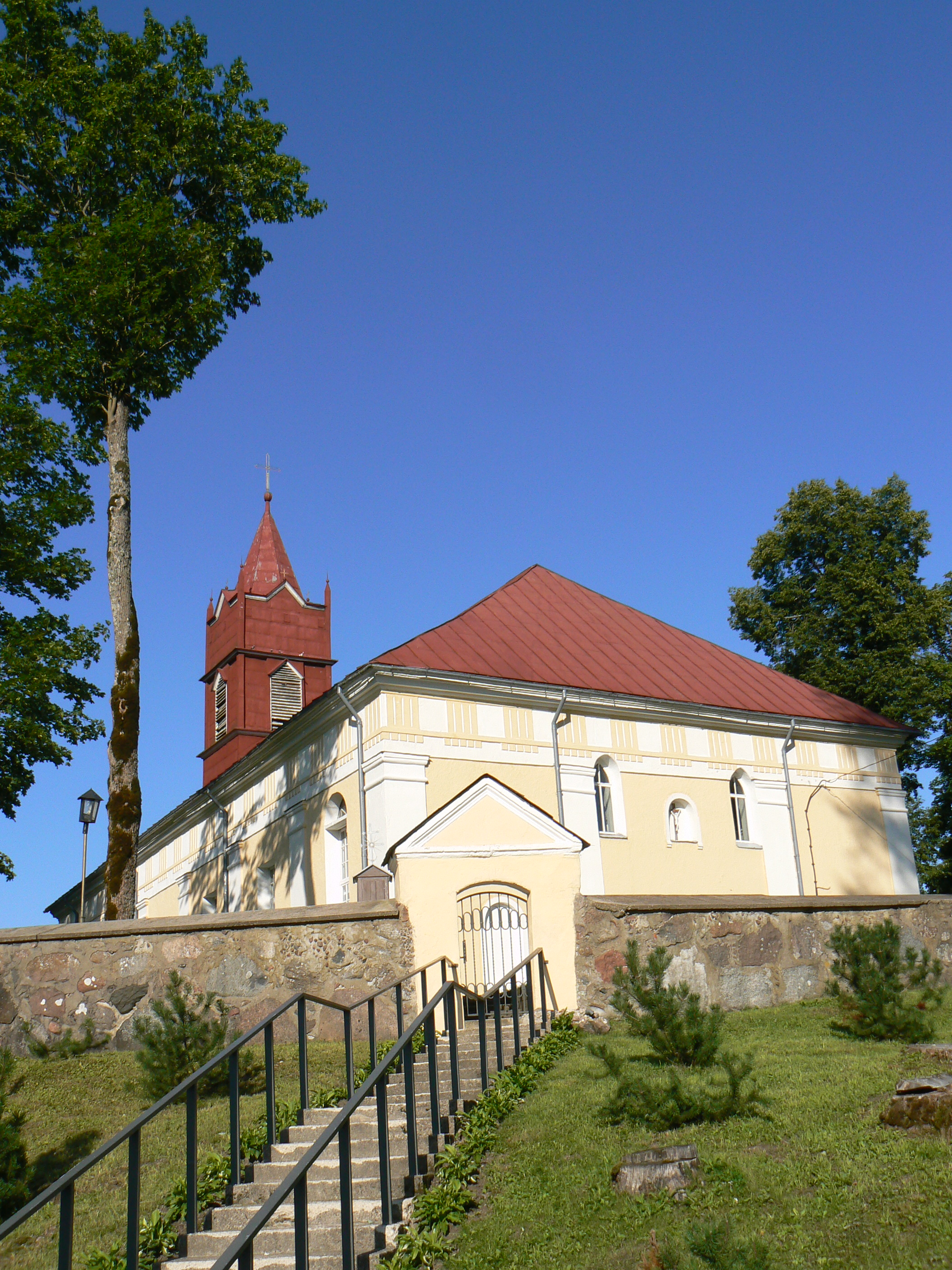
Back of Holy Trinity Church

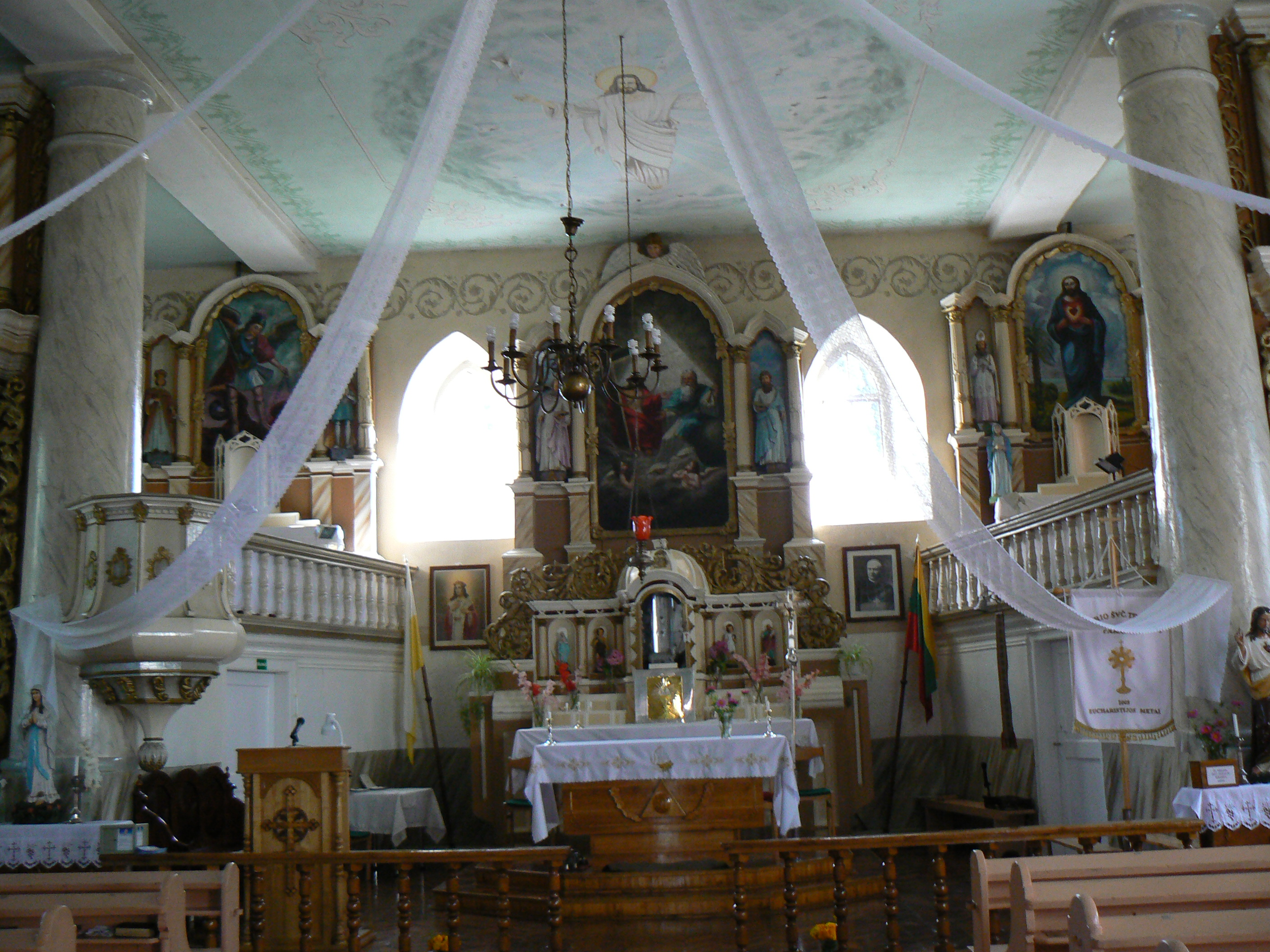
Holy Trinity Church interior

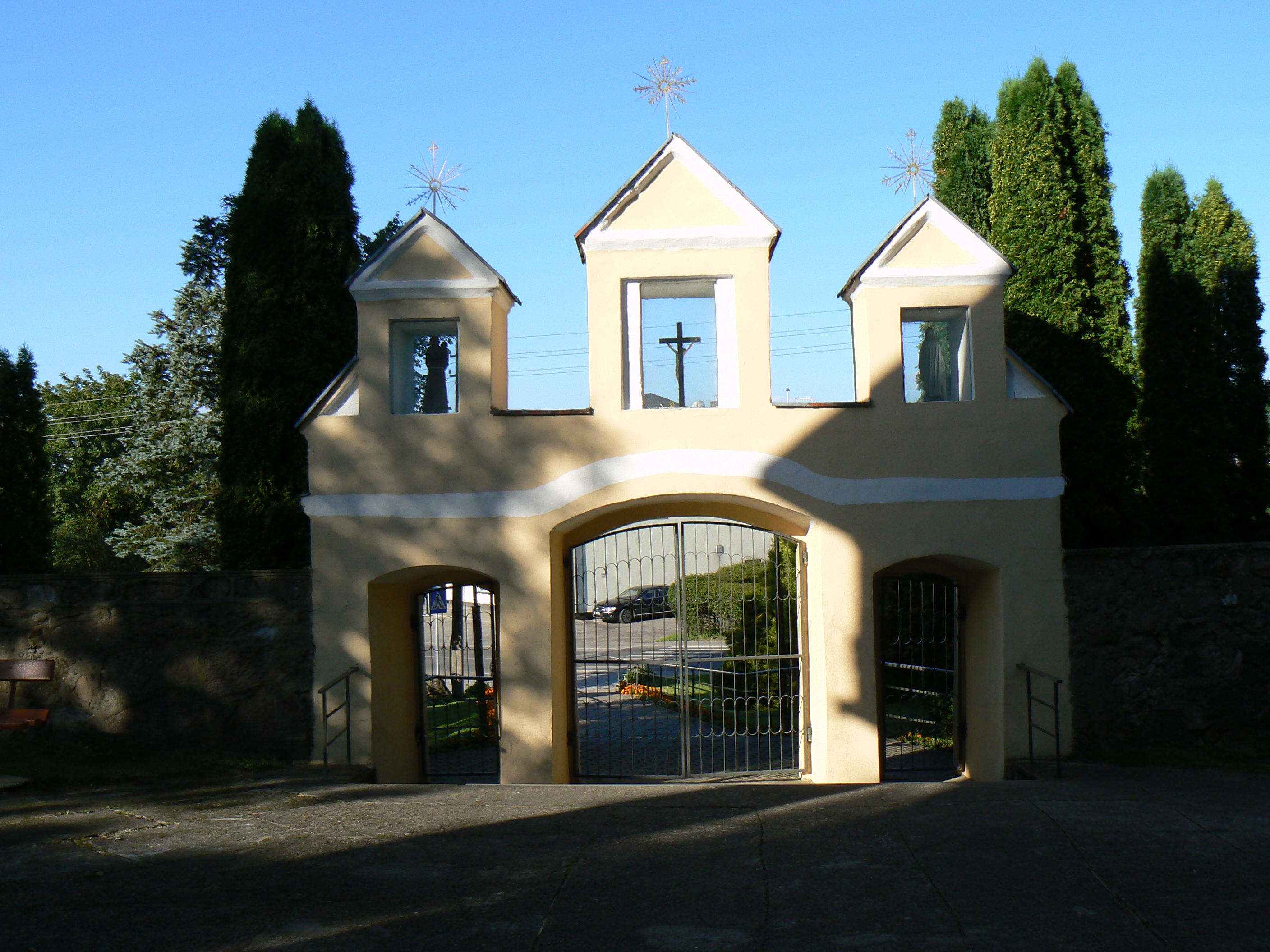
Entrance to the church

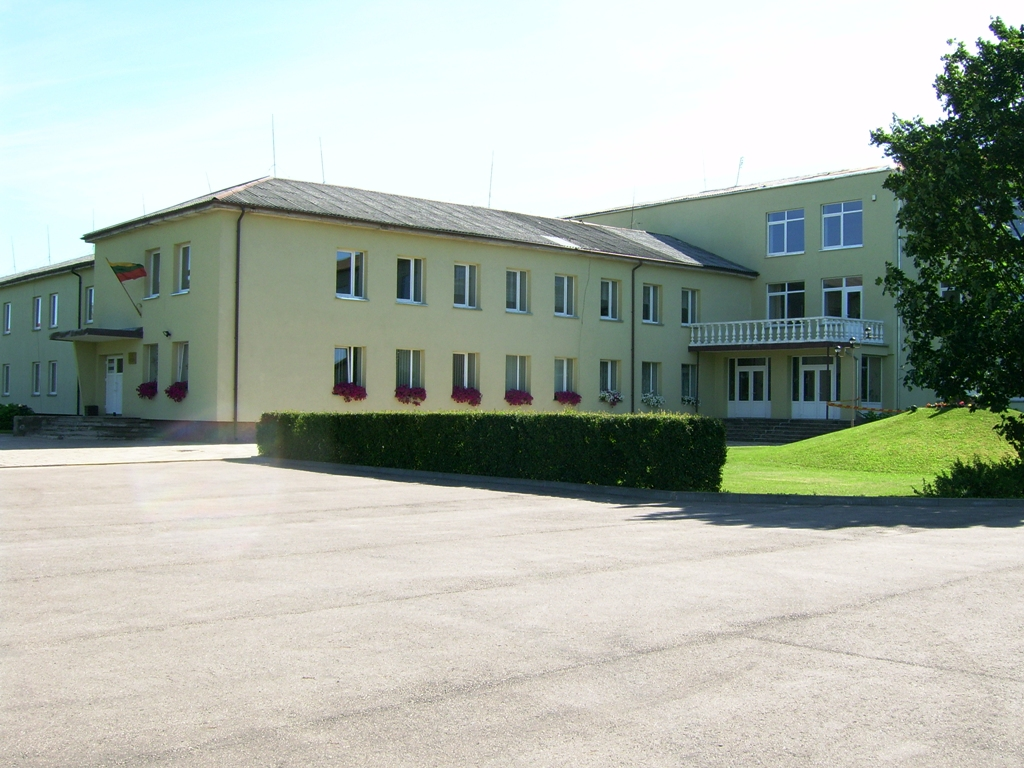
School

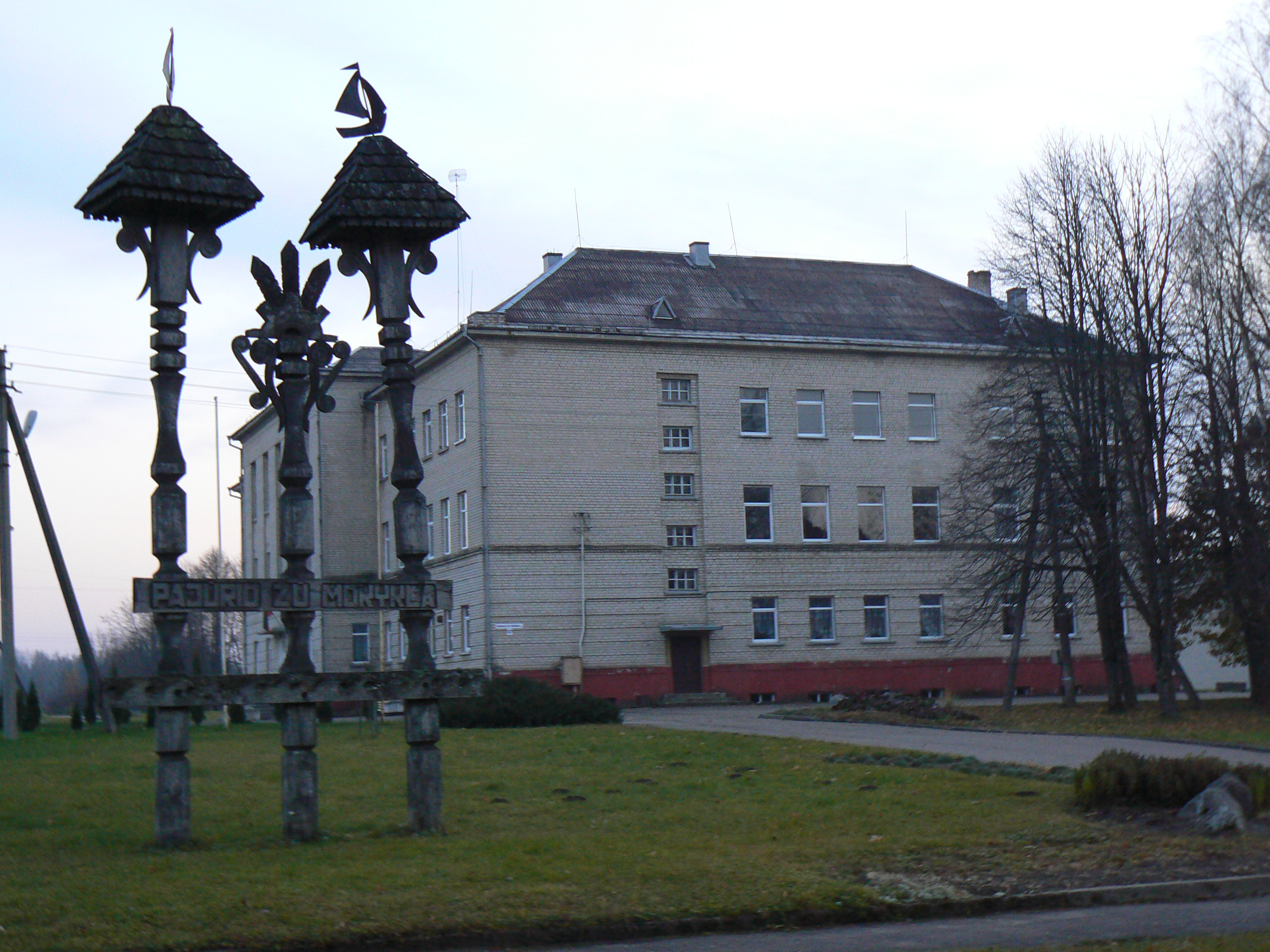
Agricultural school

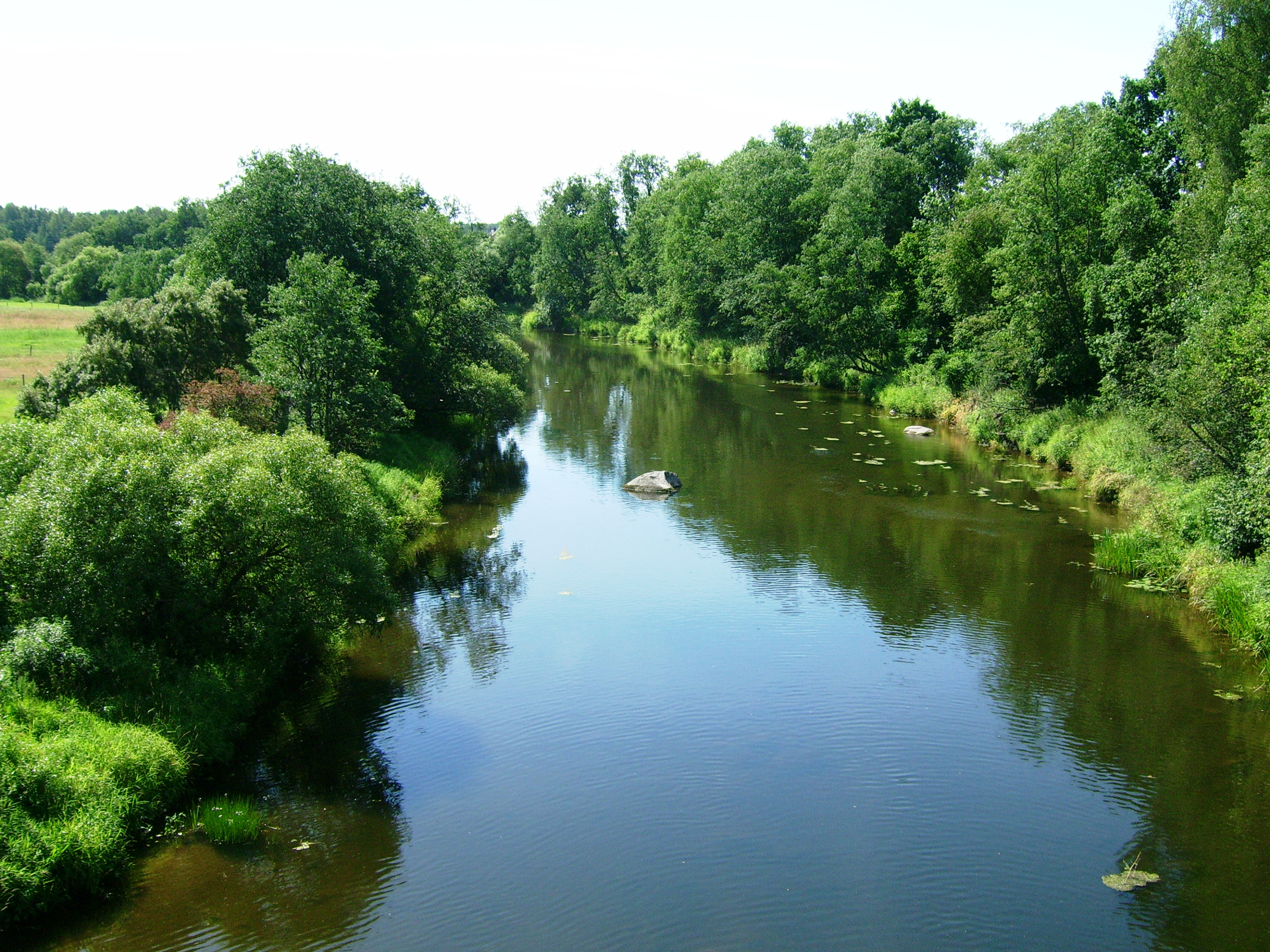
Jūra river near Pajūris
