= Jurbarkas District Municipality =

Jurbarkas District Municipality Jurbarko rajono savivaldybė
- District Municipality
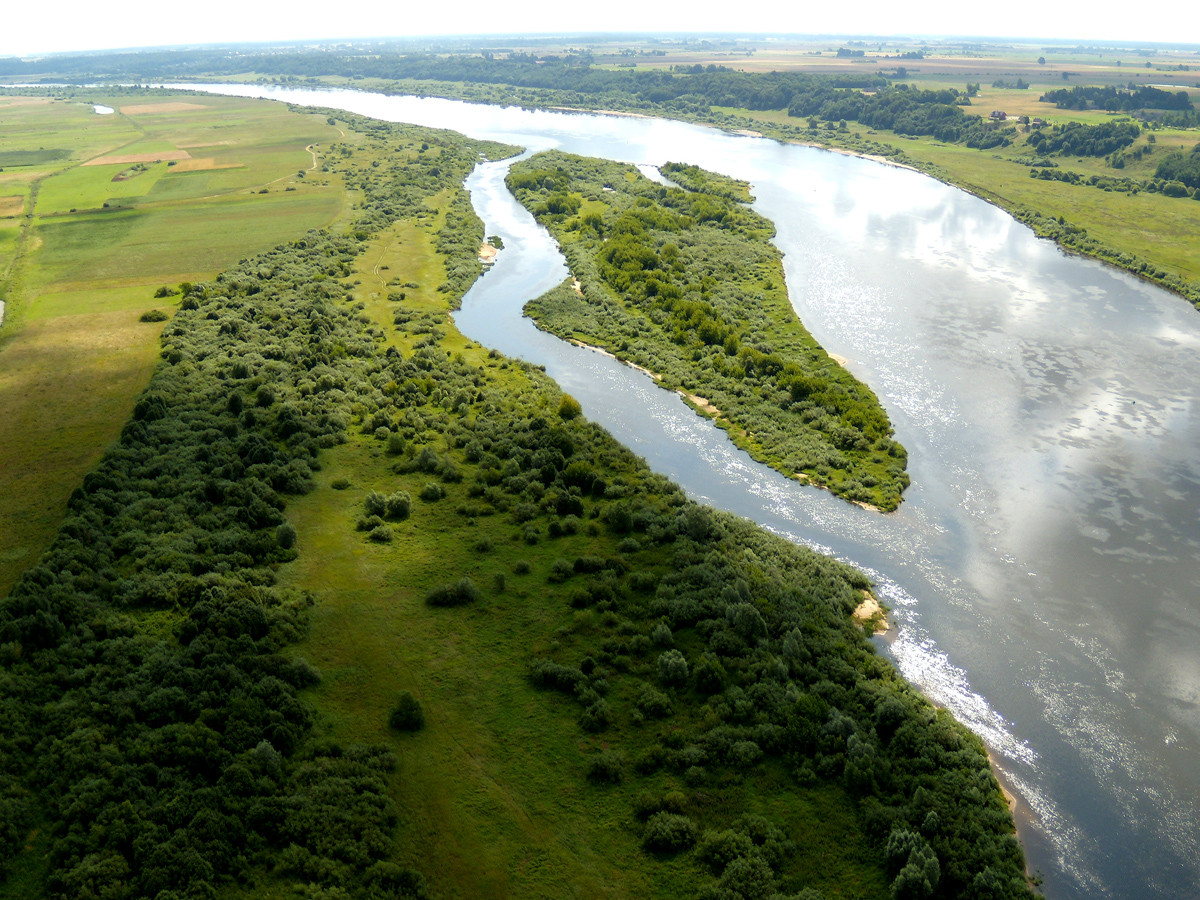
- Nemunas near Molynė

- Coat of arms

- Location of Jurbarkas District Municipality within Lithuania

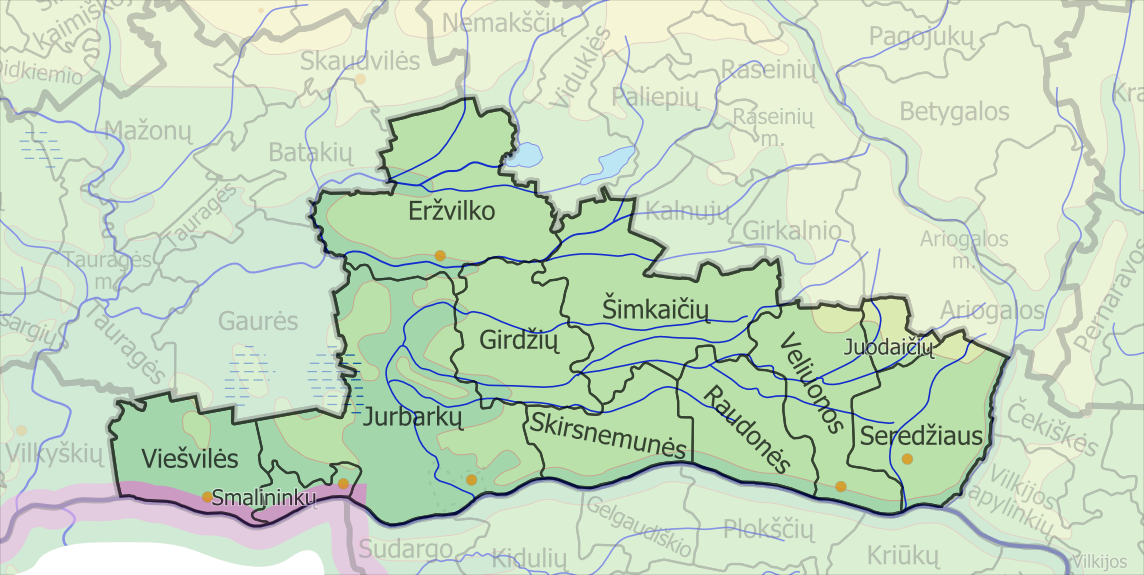
- Location of Jurbarkas
- Coordinates: 55°12′00″N 22°55′48″E
- Country: Lithuania
- Region: Žemaitija–Mažoji Lietuva
- County: Tauragė County
- Established: 1950 (76 years ago)
- Capital: Jurbarkas
- Elderships: 12

Government
  - Type: City Council
  - Body: Jurbarkas District Council
  - Mayor: Skirmantas Mockevičius (Ind.)
  - Leading: Social Democratic Party 5 / 25

Area
  - Total: 1,506 km^{2} (581 sq mi)
  - Rank: 13th
- Elevation: 90 m (300 ft)

Population (2022)
  - Total: 24,787
  - Rank: 34th
  - Density: 16.46/km^{2} (42.6/sq mi)
  - Rank: 44th
- Time zone: UTC+2 (EET)
  - Summer (DST): UTC+3 (EEST)
- ZIP Codes: 74001–74486
- Phone code: +370 (447)
- Website: www.jurbarkas.lt www.jurbarkas.lt/jurbarko-rajonas/

Jurbarkas District Municipality (Lithuanian: Jurbarko rajono savivaldybė) is a municipality in Tauragė County, Lithuania

== Elderships ==
Jurbarkas District Municipality is divided into 12 elderships:

Eldership (Administrative Center)	Area	Population (2021)
Eržvilkas (Eržvilkas)	235 km^{2} (58,069.76 acres; 90.73 sq mi)	1,923
Girdžiai (Girdžiai)	89 km^{2} (21,992.38 acres; 34.36 sq mi)	927
Juodaičiai (Juodaičiai)	31 km^{2} (7,660.27 acres; 11.97 sq mi)	322
Jurbarkas City (Jurbarkas)	13.3 km^{2} (3,286.50 acres; 5.14 sq mi)	10,186
Jurbarkai (Jurbarkai)	268 km^{2} (66,224.24 acres; 103.48 sq mi)	2,582
Raudonė (Raudonė)	109 km^{2} (26,934.49 acres; 42.09 sq mi)	1,027
Seredžius (Seredžius)	136.6 km^{2} (33,754.60 acres; 52.74 sq mi)	1,906
Skirsnemunė (Skirsnemunė)	121.4 km^{2} (29,998.59 acres; 46.87 sq mi)	1,653
Smalininkai (Smalininkai)	22.3 km^{2} (5,510.45 acres; 8.61 sq mi)	1,052
Šimkaičiai (Šimkaičiai)	241 km^{2} (59,552.40 acres; 93.05 sq mi)	1,561
Veliuona (Veliuona)	120 km^{2} (29,652.65 acres; 46.33 sq mi)	1,220
Viešvilė (Viešvilė)	121 km^{2} (29,899.75 acres; 46.72 sq mi)	815

== Population by locality ==
2011 Census
Locality	Status	Total	Male	Female
Jurbarko d. mun.		30,186	14,113	16,073
Eržvilkas Eldership (seniūnija)		2,433	1,171	1,262
Avietiškiai	K	33	15	18
Balandžiai	K	28	13	15
Baužaičiai	K	14	6	8
Būdos	VS	0	0	0
Būkintlaukis	K	11	7	4
Būtaičiai	K	11	8	3
Čepaičiai	K	0	0	0
Daugėliai	K	17	8	9
Dirvonai	K	18	9	9
Dugnai	K	0	0	0
Dūdlaukis	K	6	3	3
Eimantai	K	11	6	5
Eržvilkas	K	13	7	6
Eržvilkas	MST	429	198	231
Fermos	K	7	3	4
Gabšiškiai	K	19	11	8
Garšvilai	K	10	7	3
Kalnučiai	K	2	1	1
Kartupiai	K	136	64	72
Klevinė	K	7	3	4
Kubiliškė	K	18	7	11
Kulvertiškiai	K	27	12	15
Lendrynė	K	3	1	2
Lenkčiai I	K	43	22	21
Lenkčiai II	K	21	11	10
Lentinė	K	13	6	7
Leonavas	K	19	11	8
Lybiškiai	K	299	140	159
Milaičiai	K	4	2	2
Mosteikiai	K	54	27	27
Naujininkai	K	22	13	9
Openiškė	K	10	4	6
Paberžiai	K	10	6	4
Padvarninkai	K	0	0	0
Pagatupys	K	7	3	4
Pagiriai	K	13	5	8
Pagojys	K	2	1	1
Palabaukščiai	K	12	5	7
Pašaltuonys	K	251	127	124
Paupynis	K	10	6	4
Paupys	K	41	16	25
Paviščiovys	K	35	16	19
Petkaičiai	K	40	20	20
Pikeliai	K	23	10	13
Plekiai	K	19	9	10
Polai	K	19	10	9
Pratvalkai	K	10	3	7
Pužiškiai	K	32	14	18
Rikyškiai	K	11	5	6
Rimšai	K	17	11	6
Ropynė	K	0	0	0
Rudžiai	K	19	10	9
Rutkiškiai	K	152	67	85
Sarakiškiai	K	12	7	5
Sarapiniškiai	K	9	3	6
Skliausčiai	K	22	13	9
Smaidriai	K	7	3	4
Sniegoniškė	K	26	13	13
Steponava	K	18	10	8
Stiegvilai	K	22	13	9
Šveisčiai	K	0	0	0
Tadaušava	K	16	9	7
Taubučiai	K	30	13	17
Taučeliai	K	31	16	15
Trakai	K	1	1	0
Užakmeniai	K	11	6	5
Užšešuviai	K	0	0	0
Varlaukis	K	142	67	75
Varnaičiai	K	5	2	3
Verėpai	K	17	10	7
Viršiliškė	K	3	2	1
Žukaičiai	K	33	14	19
Girdžiai Eldership (seniūnija)		1,146	561	585
Baciai	K	5	3	2
Butkaičiai	K	52	26	26
Butkaičiai II	K	0	0	0
Būtrimai	K	58	33	25
Dargiai	K	5	2	3
Drebulynė	K	10	4	6
Džiugai	K	4	2	2
Eidukiškiai	K	8	4	4
Girdžiai	K	433	202	231
Gudeliai	K	172	82	90
Jokūbaičiai I	K	28	15	13
Jokūbaičiai II	K	0	0	0
Jurgeliškiai	K	1	1	0
Kavoliai I	K	26	14	12
Kavoliai II	K	4	2	2
Kuziai	K	0	0	0
Miliušiai	K	22	12	10
Naujininkai	K	5	3	2
Paantvardys II	K	0	0	0
Pavidaujys	K	2	0	2
Pavidaujys I	K	254	125	129
Pavidaujys II	K	4	2	2
Pavidaujys III	K	0	0	0
Pažėrai	K	22	13	9
Pocaičiai	K	25	13	12
Ridikiškiai	K	6	3	3
Juodaičiai Eldership (seniūnija)		460	215	245
Juodaičiai	K	385	177	208
Mišiūnai	K	29	18	11
Pagausantys I	K	16	4	12
Pagausantys II	K	23	13	10
Pakarklys	K	7	3	4
Užringis	K	0	0	0
Jurbarkas City Eldership (seniūnija)		11,232	5,092	6,140
Jurbarkas	M	11,232	5,092	6,140
Jurbarkai Eldership (seniūnija)		3,055	1,489	1,566
Antkalniai	K	6	4	2
Antkalniškiai	K	50	31	19
Balneliškiai	K	0	0	0
Balniai I	K	14	6	8
Balniai II	K	48	26	22
Bandzinai I	K	7	4	3
Bandzinai II	K	7	4	3
Bendžiai	K	22	9	13
Buitkiškiai	K	3	2	1
Dainiai	K	237	116	121
Dainiai II	K	88	51	37
Dargaitėliai	K	25	13	12
Gedžiai	K	73	37	36
Geišiai	K	23	11	12
Giedriai	K	32	16	16
Globiai	K	0	0	0
Greičiai	K	51	30	21
Jerubiškiai	K	13	7	6
Jokymiškiai	K	16	9	7
Jurbarkai	K	798	381	417
Kalniškiai	K	21	11	10
Kalnėnai	K	28	17	11
Kažemėkai	K	6	1	5
Klišiai	K	115	54	61
Kriščiaviškė	K	4	2	2
Kuturiai	K	57	27	30
Lemantiškiai	K	0	0	0
Lukšiai	K	15	9	6
Mantviliai	K	35	15	20
Mantviliai II	K	0	0	0
Meškininkai	K	31	12	19
Mikutaičiai I	K	35	16	19
Mikutaičiai II	K	22	11	11
Naujasodžiai	K	53	32	21
Naujininkėliai	K	21	12	9
Palėkiai	K	30	16	14
Pašventys	K	52	24	28
Rauktiškiai	K	19	12	7
Rotuliai	K	384	176	208
Rotuliai II	K	9	6	3
Rukšniai	K	9	3	6
Saukai	K	2	1	1
Smukučiai	K	23	11	12
Telviakai	K	20	10	10
Užkalniai	K	20	8	12
Užvajočiai	K	7	2	5
Vajotai	K	50	24	26
Valuckai	K	1	0	1
Vanaginė	K	8	4	4
Velėniškiai	K	13	6	7
Vertimai	K	94	48	46
Vidugiris	K	3	1	2
Vilniškiai	K	89	41	48
Žindaičiai	K	258	116	142
Žirniškiai	K	8	4	4
Raudonė Eldership (seniūnija)		1,359	672	687
Adomaitiškė	K	0	0	0
Ambručiai	K	1	0	1
Andriušiūnai	K	2	1	1
Balandžiai	K	91	42	49
Bartiškiai	K	20	13	7
Birbilai	K	15	10	5
Čerbai	K	1	0	1
Dangutiškė	K	0	0	0
Dubinskiai	K	4	2	2
Graužėnai	K	57	32	25
Kybartai	K	27	13	14
Klapatinė	K	14	8	6
Milkūniškė	K	0	0	0
Miškai	K	0	0	0
Naujininkai	K	3	1	2
Naujokai	K	57	25	32
Paantvardys	K	8	4	4
Pamituvys I	K	4	1	3
Pamituvys II	K	1	1	0
Pareviai	K	17	10	7
Pasnietalys	K	57	28	29
Pjauniai	K	17	9	8
Pupkaimis	K	68	33	35
Raudonė	K	34	14	20
Raudonė	MST	510	247	263
Raudonėnai	K	152	72	80
Sausgiriai	K	2	0	2
Stakiai	K	14	8	6
Stakiai	MST	170	91	79
Šambarava	K	12	6	6
Vaičiuškai	K	1	1	0
Seredžiaus Eldership (seniūnija)		2,464	1,124	1,340
Armeniškiai	K	155	74	81
Aukštrakis	K	0	0	0
Belvederis	K	41	16	25
Burbinė	K	20	11	9
Burbiškiai	K	67	29	38
Dainaviškiai	K	9	5	4
Daugeliškiai	K	0	0	0
Daujotai	K	2	1	1
Domantai	K	5	2	3
Eimučiai	K	16	7	9
Eimutiškė	K	0	0	0
Gadvaišai	K	31	14	17
Girkai	K	20	11	9
Goniūnai	K	10	6	4
Grivančiai	K	13	8	5
Išlestakiai	K	11	5	6
Jurgiškiai	K	5	3	2
Klausučiai	K	902	412	490
Klumpė	VS	0	0	0
Merontiškiai	K	2	1	1
Motiškiai	K	71	26	45
Naciūnai	K	3	2	1
Paarmenys	K	20	10	10
Padubysys	K	66	30	36
Papartynai	K	6	3	3
Pašiliai	K	13	6	7
Paupstaliai	K	14	6	8
Pavambaliai	K	8	4	4
Pavietava	K	6	3	3
Pieštvėnai	K	37	21	16
Pikčiūnai	K	13	5	8
Ramovė	K	0	0	0
Rukšioniai	K	4	3	1
Rūstekoniai	K	31	16	15
Seredžius	MST	590	251	339
Skubai	K	19	10	9
Spruktai	K	22	11	11
Staciūnai	K	3	2	1
Šapališkiai	K	0	0	0
Šilaitynė	K	18	9	9
Vambaliai	K	27	11	16
Vitkūnai	K	4	2	2
Vyliaudai	K	1	1	0
Vosbutai	K	136	65	71
Zabranas	K	0	0	0
Žardiškiai	K	36	17	19
Žemaitaičiai	K	7	5	2
Skirsnemunės Eldership (seniūnija)		2,044	968	1,076
Antkalniškiai	K	30	17	13
Girvalakiai	K	2	1	1
Jakaičiai	K	134	61	73
Kalniškiai	K	9	5	4
Kaniūkai	K	25	10	15
Kartupėnai	K	56	26	30
Molynė	K	99	42	57
Naubariškiai	K	4	2	2
Naukaimis II	K	120	61	59
Paantvardys	K	1	1	0
Panemunė	K	5	3	2
Pilis I	K	331	164	167
Pilis II	K	32	14	18
Skirsnemunė	K	772	356	416
Skirsnemuniškiai I	K	8	5	3
Skirsnemuniškiai II	K	18	9	9
Skirsnemuniškiai III	K	80	34	46
Sliekiškiai	K	18	9	9
Šilinė	K	19	8	11
Švendriškiai	K	86	45	41
Vencloviškiai	K	145	75	70
Žvyriai	K	50	20	30
Smalininkų Eldership (seniūnija)		1,286	587	699
Antšvenčiai	K	31	11	20
Endriušiai	K	53	24	29
Kazikėnai	K	30	14	16
Naudvaris	VS	0	0	0
Smalininkai	K	326	140	186
Smalininkai	M	515	240	275
Tetervinė	VS	1	1	0
Užbaliai	K	5	3	2
Užtilčiai	K	12	8	4
Vidkiemis	K	310	144	166
Vilktakis	VS	3	2	1
Šimkaičių Eldership (seniūnija)		1,997	959	1,038
Akmeniškė	K	6	3	3
Antanava	K	0	0	0
Apolonovka	K	10	5	5
Artelės	K	0	0	0
Aukštrakiai	K	21	9	12
Aušgirys	K	14	7	7
Baltraitiškė	K	138	67	71
Barzdžiai	K	0	0	0
Baužai	K	0	0	0
Bebirvai	K	9	5	4
Bulzgeniškiai	K	17	8	9
Cigelnė	K	5	3	2
Degimas	K	1	0	1
Giegiai	K	12	5	7
Griaužai	K	82	36	46
Grigožiškė	K	1	0	1
Jovališkė	K	38	22	16
Kalniškiai	K	3	1	2
Kalupiai	K	4	2	2
Kazokai	K	0	0	0
Kebiškiai	K	2	1	1
Kniečiai	K	145	67	78
Lapgiriai	K	32	17	15
Liudvinava	K	55	29	26
Medininkai	K	8	4	4
Naukaimis	K	5	4	1
Paalsys I	K	43	21	22
Paalsys II	K	11	5	6
Pabebirvys	K	19	9	10
Paišlynys	K	44	23	21
Pamituvys	K	14	6	8
Paparčiai	K	0	0	0
Paskynai	K	206	104	102
Pauliai	K	226	109	117
Pavidaujys	K	16	7	9
Peldžiūnai	K	8	5	3
Rievai	K	0	0	0
Rupeikiai	K	19	10	9
Stulgiai	K	11	5	6
Šapališkė	K	8	4	4
Šilišninkai	K	0	0	0
Šilkalnis	K	39	19	20
Šimkaičiai	K	59	32	27
Šimkaičiai	MST	204	97	107
Vadžgirys	K	7	4	3
Vadžgirys	MST	440	195	245
Vidauja	K	9	7	2
Vidgiris	K	1	0	1
Volungiškė	K	0	0	0
Zagriaužis	K	0	0	0
Žvirblaukys	K	5	2	3
Veliuonos Eldership (seniūnija)		1,634	766	868
Akmeniškiai	K	16	7	9
Antkalnė	K	24	10	14
Bereiviškiai	K	5	3	2
Birbiliškė	K	24	9	15
Džiaugiai	K	22	7	15
Gausantiškiai	K	29	14	15
Gervėnai	K	10	4	6
Gystėnai	K	43	25	18
Griciai	K	119	56	63
Gudžiūnai	K	21	11	10
Kabučiai	K	7	4	3
Kalviai	K	18	5	13
Karalinava	K	0	0	0
Kelmickai	K	0	0	0
Klangiai	K	72	35	37
Liucinava	K	33	16	17
Minelgai	K	7	3	4
Paagliuonys	K	5	2	3
Pakalniškiai	K	26	13	13
Pamituvys	K	19	11	8
Papiškiai	K	13	6	7
Pelučiai	K	40	17	23
Pelutėliai	K	24	12	12
Skardinė	K	2	1	1
Stalioriai	K	11	6	5
Šiauliai	K	31	17	14
Škeršpyliai	K	4	1	3
Tamošiai	K	218	96	122
Terespolis	K	1	1	0
Veliuona	MST	726	339	387
Zubrickai	K	33	18	15
Želmenai	K	7	5	2
Žibintai	K	24	12	12
Viešvilės Eldership (seniūnija)		1,076	509	567
Antupiai	K	12	7	5
Apšriūtai	K	10	4	6
Baltupėnai	K	0	0	0
Išdagai	K	11	8	3
Jūrava	K	41	17	24
Kalveliai	K	11	8	3
Leipgiriai	K	16	10	6
Naumalūnis	VS	3	2	1
Pagulbiniai	K	13	7	6
Ridelkalnis	K	106	53	53
Smaladaržis	VS	0	0	0
Viešvilė	MST	843	387	456
Vilkdaubis	VS	5	3	2
Žardeliai	K	5	3	2

- Status: M, MST - city, town / K, GST - village / VS - steading
