= Skirsnemunė Eldership =

Eldership of Lithuania

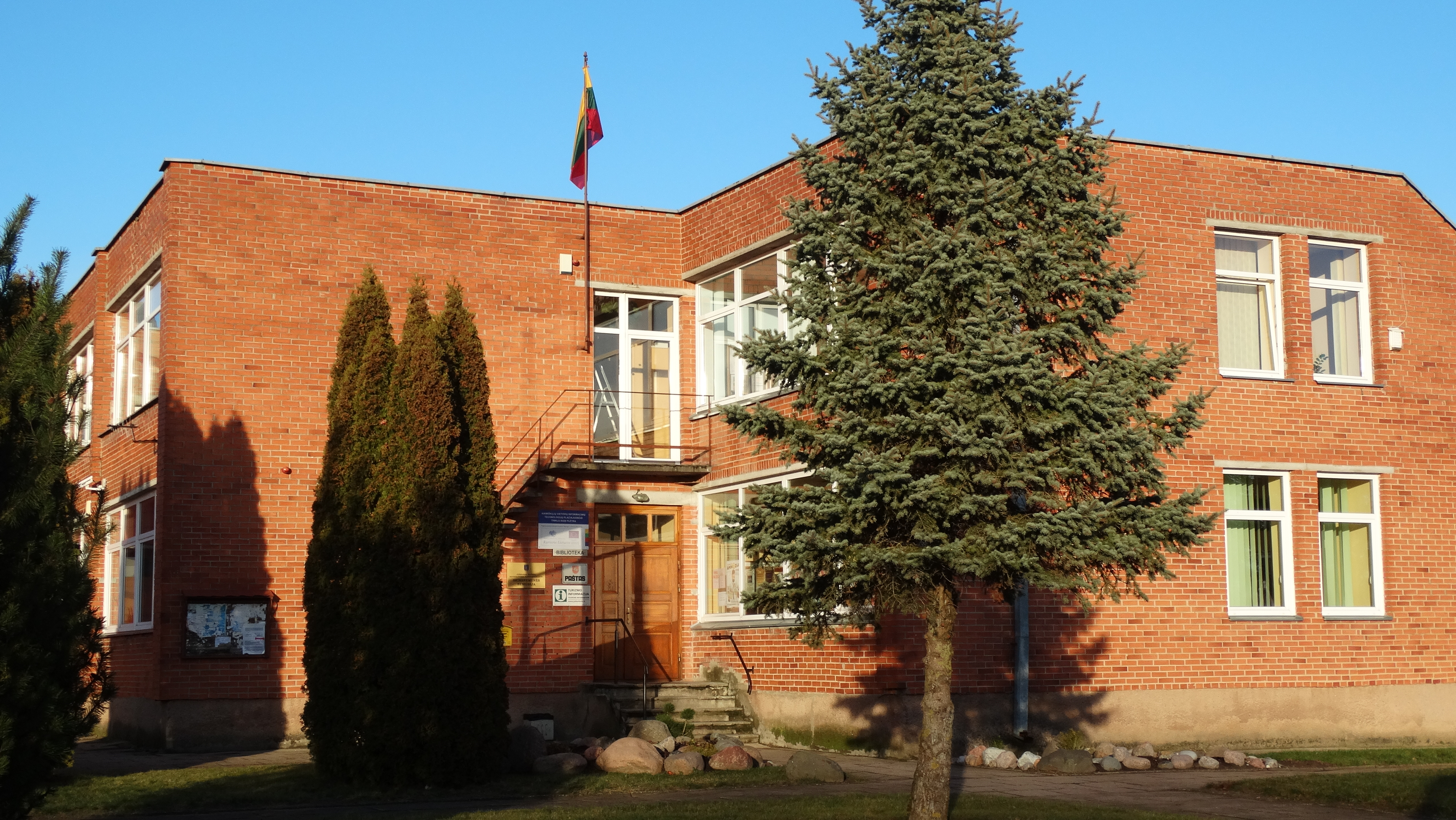
Skirsnemunė

The Skirsnemunė Eldership (Lithuanian: Skirsnemunės seniūnija) is an eldership of Lithuania, located in the Jurbarkas District Municipality. In 2021 its population was 1653.
