= Veliuona Eldership =

Eldership of Lithuania

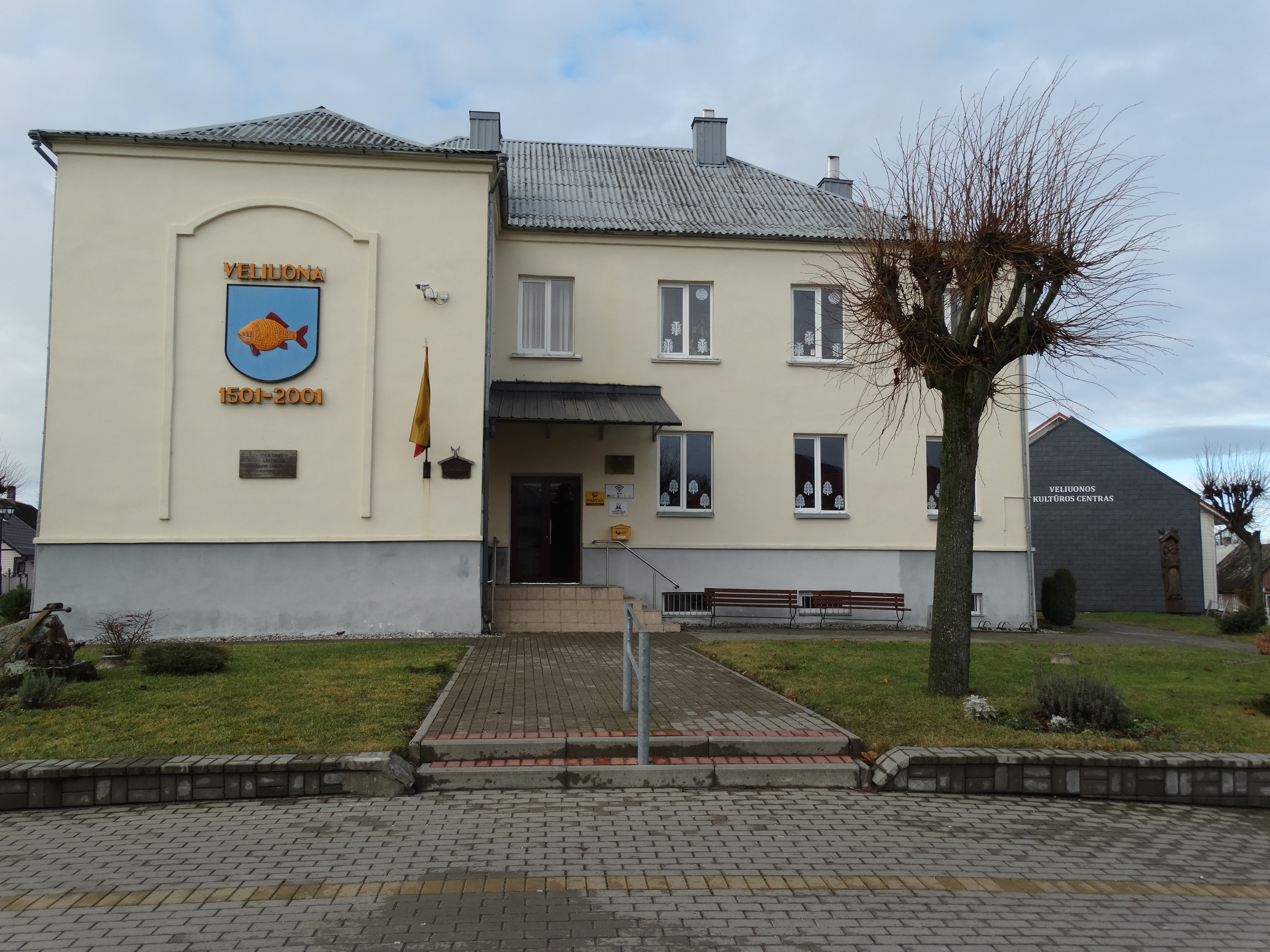
The Eldes' building, meeting place

The Veliuona Eldership (Lithuanian: Veliuonos seniūnija) is an eldership of Lithuania, located in the Jurbarkas District Municipality. In 2021 its population was 1220.
