= Eržvilkas Eldership =

Eldership of Lithuania

The Eržvilkas Eldership (Lithuanian: Eržvilko seniūnija) is an eldership of Lithuania, located in the Jurbarkas District Municipality. In 2021 its population was 1923.
