= Girdžiai Eldership =

Eldership of Lithuania

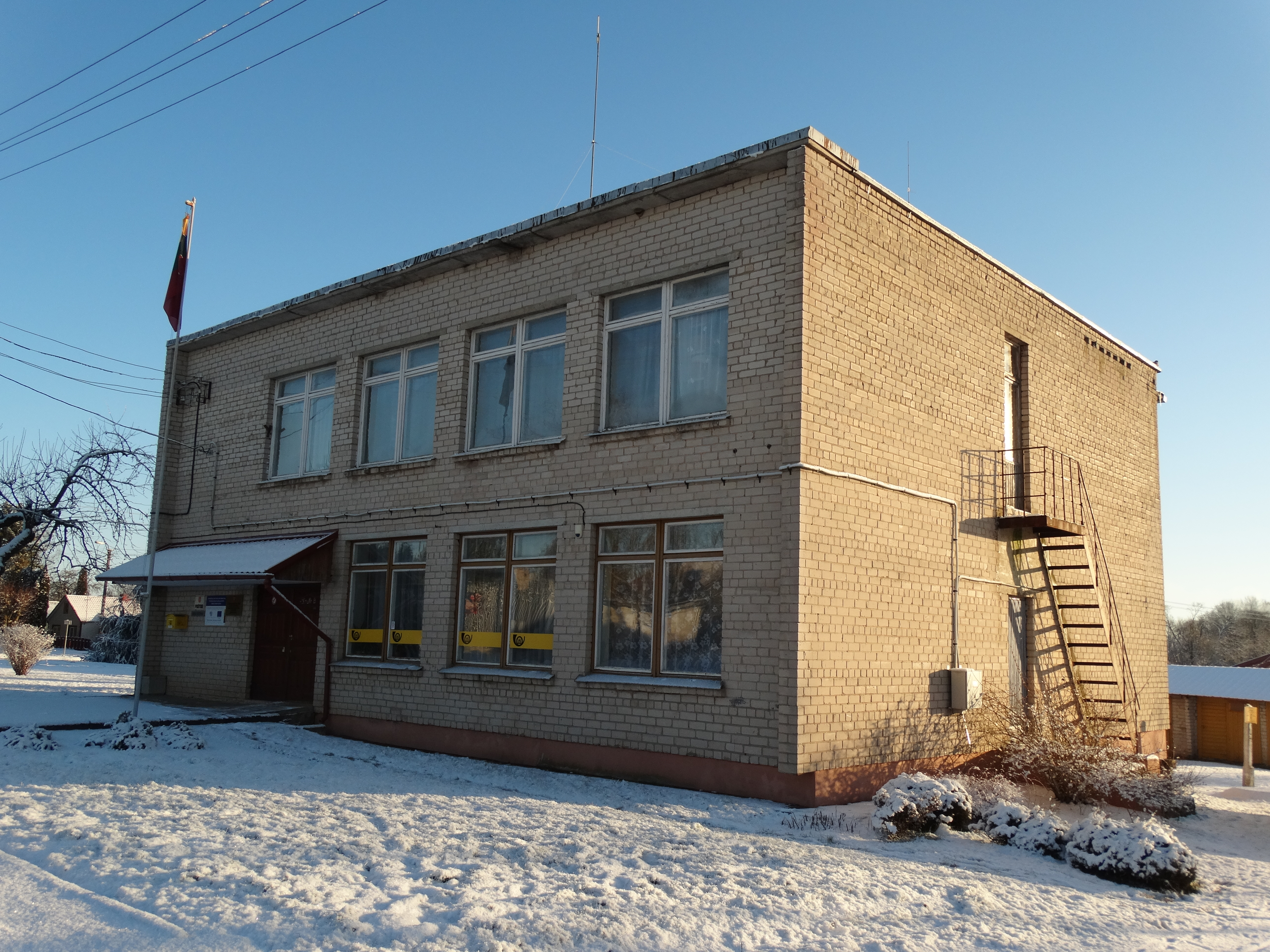
Girdžiai Eldership, Jurbarkas district, Lithuania

The Girdžiai Eldership (Lithuanian: Girdžių seniūnija) is an eldership of Lithuania, located in the Jurbarkas District Municipality. In 2021 its population was 927.
