= Jurbarkas City Eldership =

Eldership of Lithuania

The Jurbarkas City Eldership (Lithuanian: Jurbarko miesto seniūnija) is an eldership of Lithuania, located in the Jurbarkas District Municipality. It covers only the city of Jurbarkas. In 2021 its population was 10186.

The current eldership was established on January 1, 2007.

== Sub-elderships ==
In 2009 nine sub-elderships (seniūnaitija) were established:

- Algirdo-Gedimino seniūnaitija (population 1392): Algirdo Str., Gedimino Str., Žemaitės Str. 12, 14, 16, 18, 20, 21 and up to the intersection with Kęstučio Str.
- Centro seniūnaitija (population 1928): M. Valančiaus Str. 6 and up to the intersection with Vilniaus Str., Vilniaus Str., P. Cvirkos Str., K. Donelaičio Str., Taikos Str., Kalninės Str., Vasario 16-osios Str., S. Daukanto Str., Žemaitės Str. 1-11, 13, 15, 17, 19, Lauko Str. 1, 3, 5, 7, 9, Vytauto Didžiojo Str. 7, 9-30, 32, 34, 36, V. Baltrušaičio Str., A. Šabaniausko Str., B. Nedzinskienės Str., J. Banaičio Str., R. Marcinkaus Str..
- Dariaus ir Girėno seniūnaitija (population 1249): Dariaus ir Girėno g.
- Kalnėnų seniūnaitija (613 gyv.): P. Paulaičio g., Pramonės g., A. Giedraičio-Giedriaus g., Barkūnų g., Upeivių g., Muitinės g. 1-31, Tėviškės g., B. Vasiliausko g., Sielininkų g., Žiobrinės g., Statybininkų g., Kalnėnų g.
- Kęstučio seniūnaitija (population 2075): Kęstučio g.
- Miškininkų seniūnaitija (population 967): E. Grinaveckienės g., Muitinės g. from 32 to the end of the street, Knygnešių g., Lelijų g., Tulpių g., Klevų g., Pušų g., Mituvos g., Miškininkų g., Eglių g., Miško g., V. Grybo g., Vydūno g. 4, 6, 7 and up to the intersection with Knygnešių g., Pamituvio g. 1-12.
- Naujamiesčio seniūnaitija (population 1456): Mokyklos g., Pilies g., Imsrės g., V. Kudirkos g., Birutės g., Lino g., Purienų g., Lauko g. 2, 4, 6, 8, 11 and up to the intersection with Sodų g., Vytauto Didžiojo g. 31, 33, 35 37, 52, 53, 55, Stadiono g., Bišpilio sodo 1-oji g., Bišpilio sodo 2-oji g. Pilies sodo 1-oji g., Pilies sodo 2-oji g.
- Nemuno seniūnaitija (population 1511): Nemuno g., Kauno g., Kranto g., Ugniagesių g., Birželio g., Vydūno g. 1, 2, 3, 5, Vytauto Didžiojo g. 1, 2, 3, 4, 5, 6, 8, Pamituvio g. nuo 13 and up to the intersection with Vydūno g., Tilžės g., M. Valančiaus g. 1-5.
- Sodų seniūnaitija (population 954): Eržvilko g., Pušyno g., Paparčių g., Bišpilio g., Ramybės g., Sodžiaus g., Obelų g., Vakaro g., Šiaurės g., Dainių g., P. Perevičiaus g., Kaštonų g., Kriaušių g., Vyšnių g., Putino g., Spanguolių g., Serbentų g., Šviesos g., Vėjų g., Šermukšnių g., Liepų g., Aukuro g., Žalgirio g., Vaidilos g., Vaidoto g., Vyčio g., Saulėtekio g., Ateities g., Topolių g., Vytauto Didžiojo g. 54, 56 to the end of the street, Paupio g., Tujų g., Vilties g., Ryto g., Dobilo g., Pievų g., Žiedų g., Bočių g., Smukučių g., Šaltinėlio g., Pušaitės g., Šilelio g., Šilelio 1-oji g., Šilelio 2-oji g., Šilelio 3-oji g., Šilelio 4-oji g., Mituvos sodo 1-oji g., Mituvos sodo 2-oji g., Pasakos Sodo 1-oji g., Pasakos Sodo 2-oji g., Pasakos Sodo 3-oji g., Pasakos Sodo 4-oji g., Pasakos Sodo 5-oji g.,Pasakos Sodo 6-oji g., Pasakos Sodo 7-oji g., Pasakos Sodo 8-oji g.
