= Raudonė Eldership =

Eldership of Lithuania

The Raudonė Eldership (Lithuanian: Raudonės seniūnija) is an eldership of Lithuania, located in the Jurbarkas District Municipality. In 2021 its population was 1027.
