= Jurbarkai Eldership =

Eldership of Lithuania

The Jurbarkai Eldership (Lithuanian: Jurbarkų seniūnija) is an eldership of Lithuania, located in the Jurbarkas District Municipality. In 2021 its population was 2582.
