= Šumskas =

Šumskas Szumsk
- Town
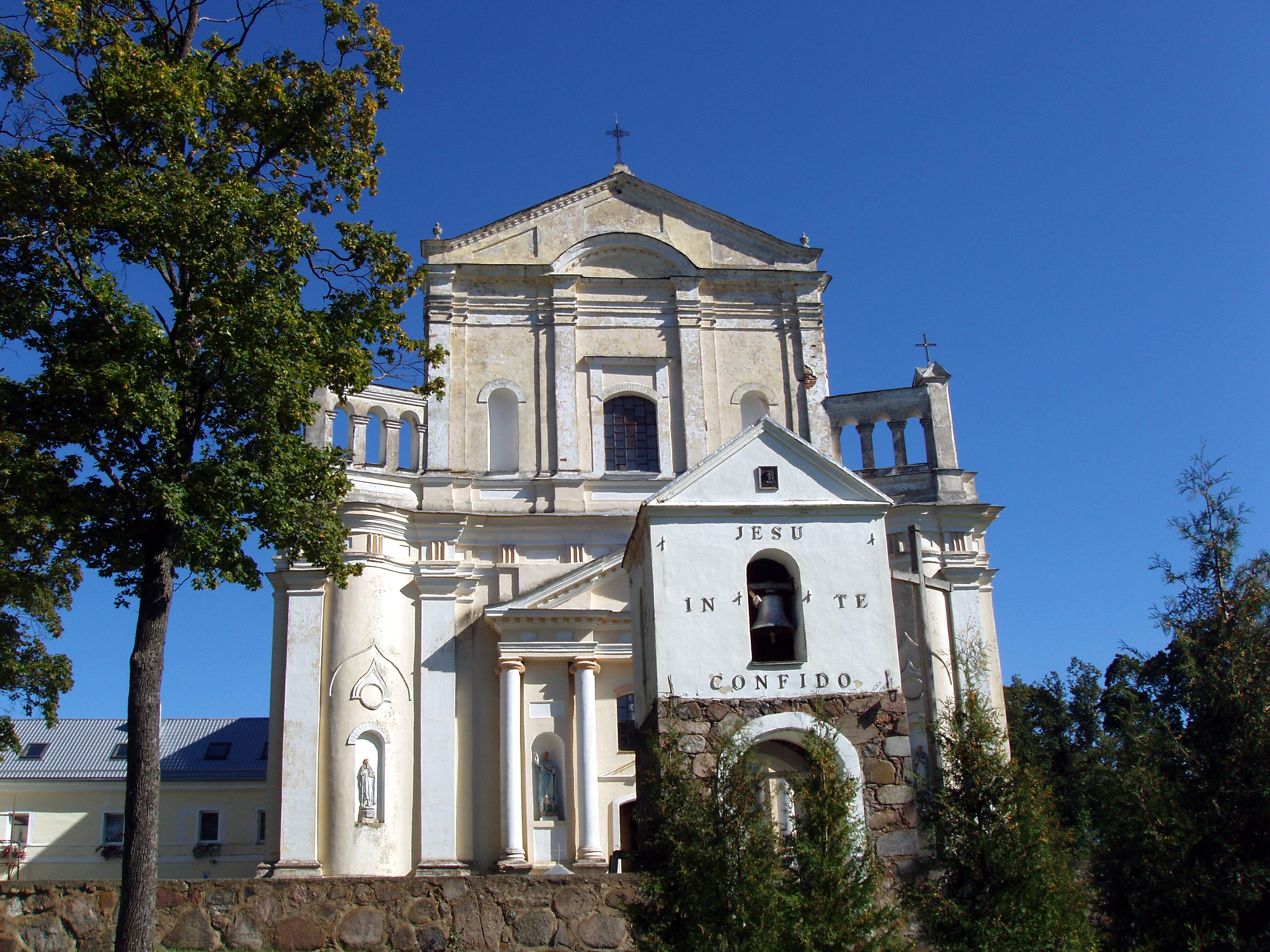
- Church of Šumskas

- Location of Šumskas
- Coordinates: 54°36′40″N 25°43′20″E
- Country: Lithuania
- Ethnographic region: Aukštaitija
- County: Vilnius County
- Municipality: Vilnius District Municipality
- Eldership: Kalveliai Eldership

Population (2021)
  - Total: 765
- Time zone: UTC+2 (EET)
  - Summer (DST): UTC+3 (EEST)

Šumskas (Polish: Szumsk or Szumsk Wileński, Yiddish: שומסק Russian: Шумск (historical)) is a town in Vilnius District Municipality, in Vilnius County, in southeast Lithuania. According to the 2011 census, the town has a population of 919 people.
