= Naukaimis II =

- Village
- Location of Svencelė
- Coordinates: 55°8′2.4″N 22°58′4.8″E
- Country: Lithuania
- Ethnographic region: Lithuania Minor
- County: Tauragė County
- Municipality: Jurbarkas district municipality
- Eldership: Skirsnemunė eldership

Population (2021)
  - Total: 50
- Time zone: UTC+2 (EET)
  - Summer (DST): UTC+3 (EEST)
- Climate: Dfb

Naukaimis II (until 2017 Naukaimis) is a village in Skirsnemunės Eldership, Jurbarkas District, Tauragė County, western Lithuania.

== Demography ==
=== Historical population ===
Historical population

Year	Pop.	±% p.a.
1923	227	—
1959	124	−1.67%
1970	141	+1.17%
1979	139	−0.16%

Year	Pop.	±% p.a.
1989	138	−0.07%
2001	58	−6.97%
2021	50	−0.74%
