= Šimkaičiai =

- Town
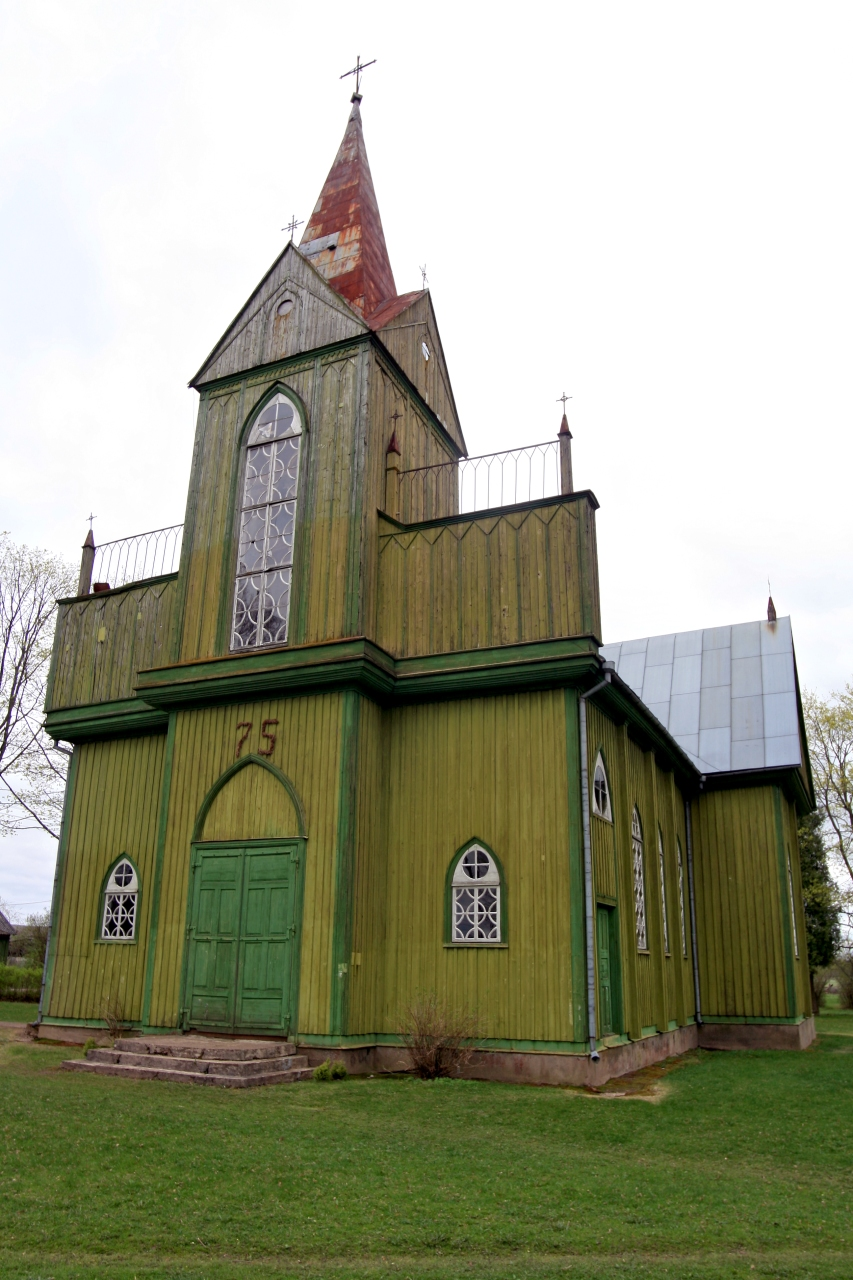

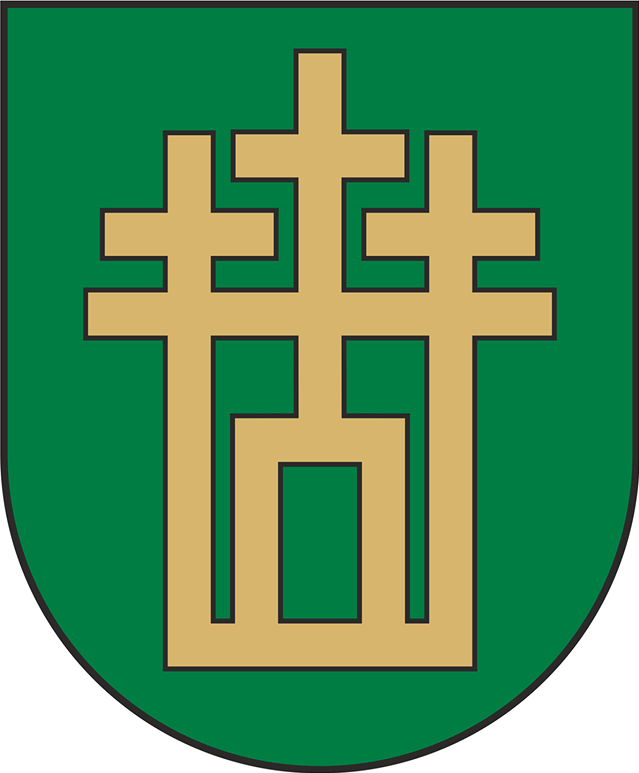
- Coat of arms

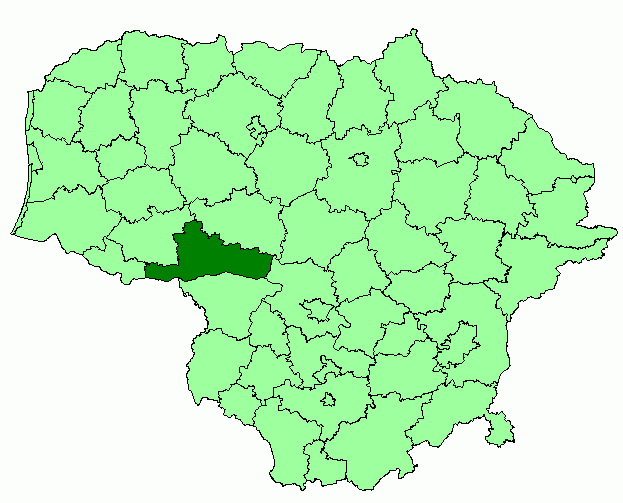
- Location in Jurbarkas district municipality Location of Jurbarkas district in Lithuania
- Coordinates: 55°14′00″N 23°00′00″E
- Country: Lithuania
- County: Tauragės
- Municipality: Jurbarkas
- Eldership: Šimkaičių

Population (2011 Census)
  - Total: 204
- Time zone: UTC+2 (EET)
  - Summer (DST): UTC+3 (EEST)

Šimkaičiai (Samogitian: Šėmkātē, Polish: Szymkajcie) is a town in Jurbarkas district municipality, Taurage County, Lithuania. According to the 2001 census, the town had a population of 265 people. At the 2011 census, the population was 204.

Before World War II the town had a Jewish population. In July, 1941, they were murdered by the Einsatzgruppen and their Lithuanian collaborators.
