= Smalininkai =

- City
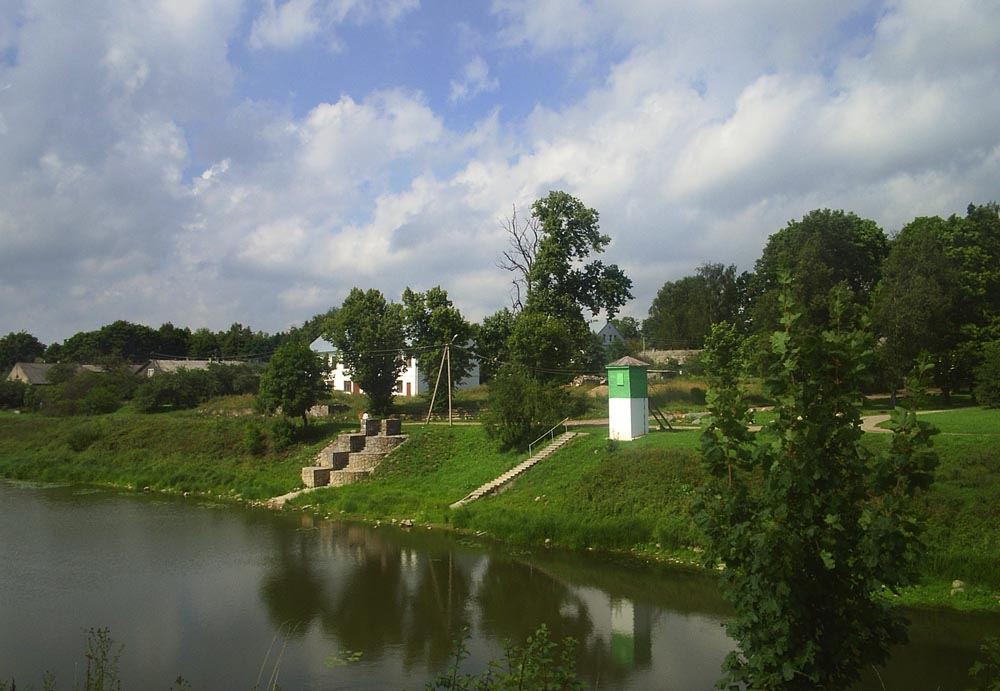
- Piers on the Nemunas River in Smalininkai

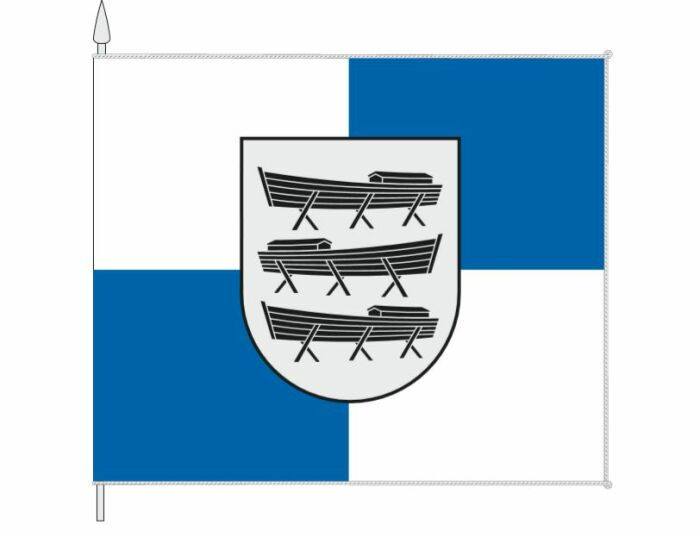
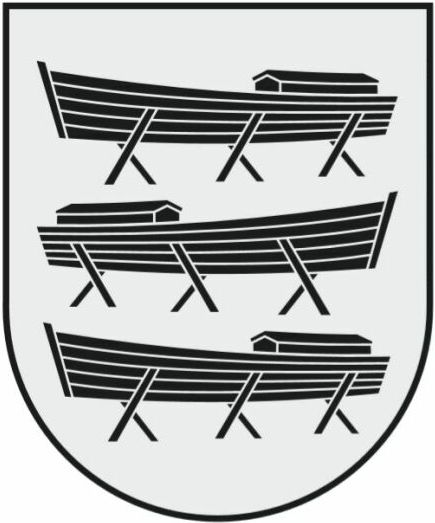
- Flag Coat of arms
- Nickname: Smolnis
- Location of Smalininkai
- Coordinates: 55°5′0″N 22°34′0″E
- Country: Lithuania
- Ethnographic region: Lithuania Minor
- County: Tauragė County
- Municipality: Jurbarkas District Municipality
- Eldership: Smalininkai eldership
- Capital of: Smalininkai eldership
- First mentioned: 15th century
- Granted city rights: 1945

Population (2021)
  - Total: 862
- Time zone: UTC+2 (EET)
  - Summer (DST): UTC+3 (EEST)

Smalininkai (German: Schmalleningken) is a small city in Lithuania. It is located on the right bank of the Neman River, 12 km (7.5 mi) west from Jurbarkas, in the region of Lithuania Minor.

== Name ==
The name describes a place of tar and pitch burners ("smala": tar, pitch; -ingken: village).

== History ==
According to the Universal Lithuanian Encyclopedia, Smalininkai was most likely settled in the late 15th century as an important border crossing point. The border was established by the Treaty of Melno in 1422 between the Grand Duchy of Lithuania and the State of the Teutonic Order. After the Thirteen Years' War (1454–1466) the area was a part of the Kingdom of Poland as a fief held by the Teutonic Knights until 1525, and then by Ducal Prussia, and thus was located within the Polish–Lithuanian union, later elevated into the Polish–Lithuanian Commonwealth. It was part of the Kingdom of Prussia after 1701. After the Third Partition of the Polish–Lithuanian Commonwealth in 1795, it became the border between East Prussia and the Russian Empire. During 1871–1914, the border was between the German and the Russian Empires.

The route for trade, and later post, from Königsberg to Kaunas passed through Smalininkai. Smalinkai was marked on the map of the Kingdom of Prussia published in 1701.

In 1792 it was appointed to a market town. In 1845 the village became a parish and 1878 a church was built there. In the late 19th century, the village had a population of 709, which was mostly employed in agriculture, shipping and timber trade. Large quantities of spirit were sold to Russia, while Polish rafters bought wooden pipes here. In 1902 a light railway was built from Pogegen (Pagėgiai) to Schmalleningken (Smalininkai).

=== 20th century ===
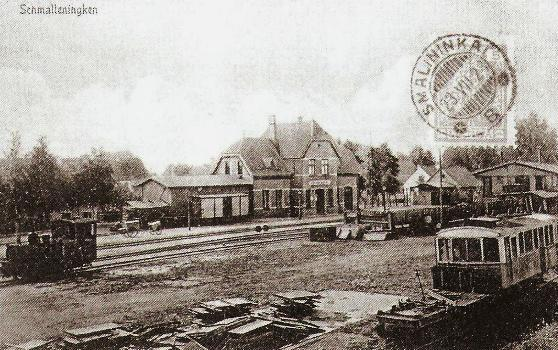
Railway station in the early 20th century

Following World War I, in 1918, Lithuania regained independence, and in 1923 eventually obtained the region. In 1925, the village had 1,741 inhabitants. After the 1939 German ultimatum to Lithuania when Germany occupied the Klaipėda Region, the border was between Nazi Germany and Lithuania. In 1939, it was annexed by Nazi Germany and incorporated into the Landkreis Tilsit-Ragnit (district). The German occupation lasted until the end of World War II in 1945. Then after the Soviet occupation of Lithuania in summer 1940, the border became the border between the Soviet Union and Nazi Germany.

== Literature ==
- Kurschat, Heinrich A.: Das Buch vom Memelland, Siebert Oldenburg 1968
- MELC (2018). "Smalininkai". In Bartoševičienė, Valė (ed.). Visuotinė lietuvių enciklopedija (in Lithuanian).
