= Juodaičiai Eldership =

Eldership of Lithuania

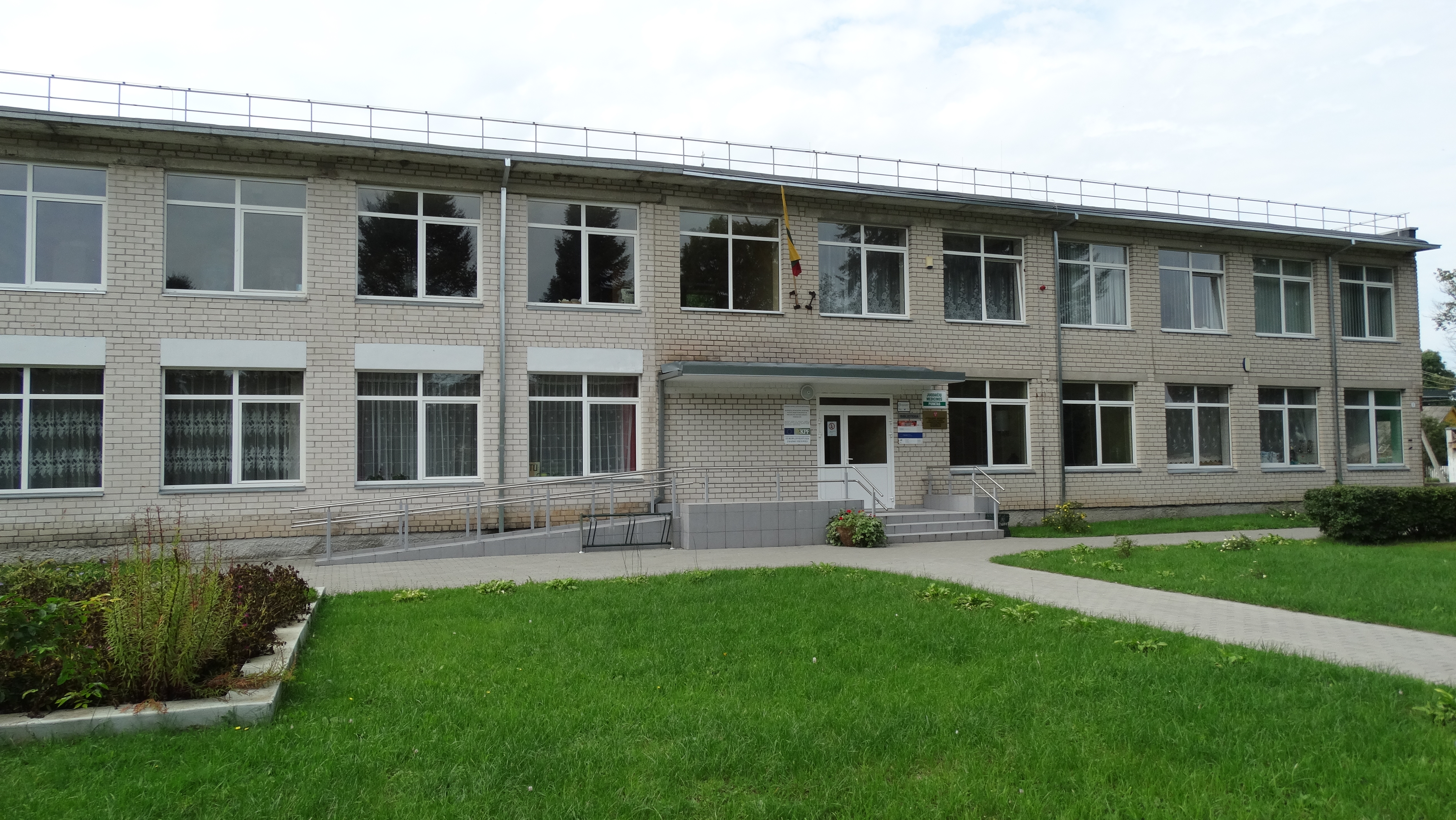

The Juodaičiai Eldership (Lithuanian: Juodaičių seniūnija) is an eldership of Lithuania, located in the Jurbarkas District Municipality. In 2021 its population was 322.
