= Kalveliai Eldership =

Kalveliai Eldership Kalvelių seniūnija
- Eldership
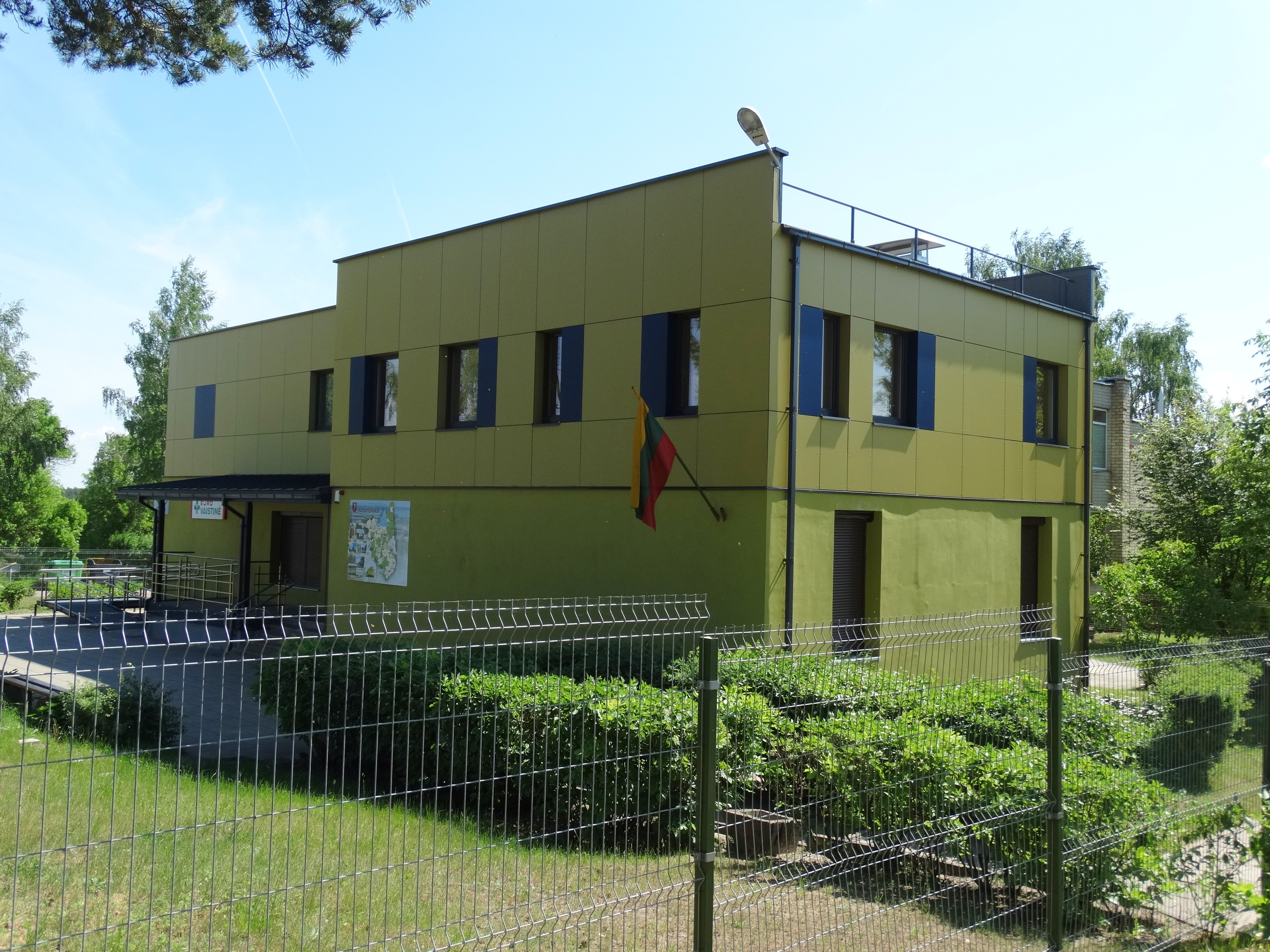
- Eldership administrative building in Kalveliai

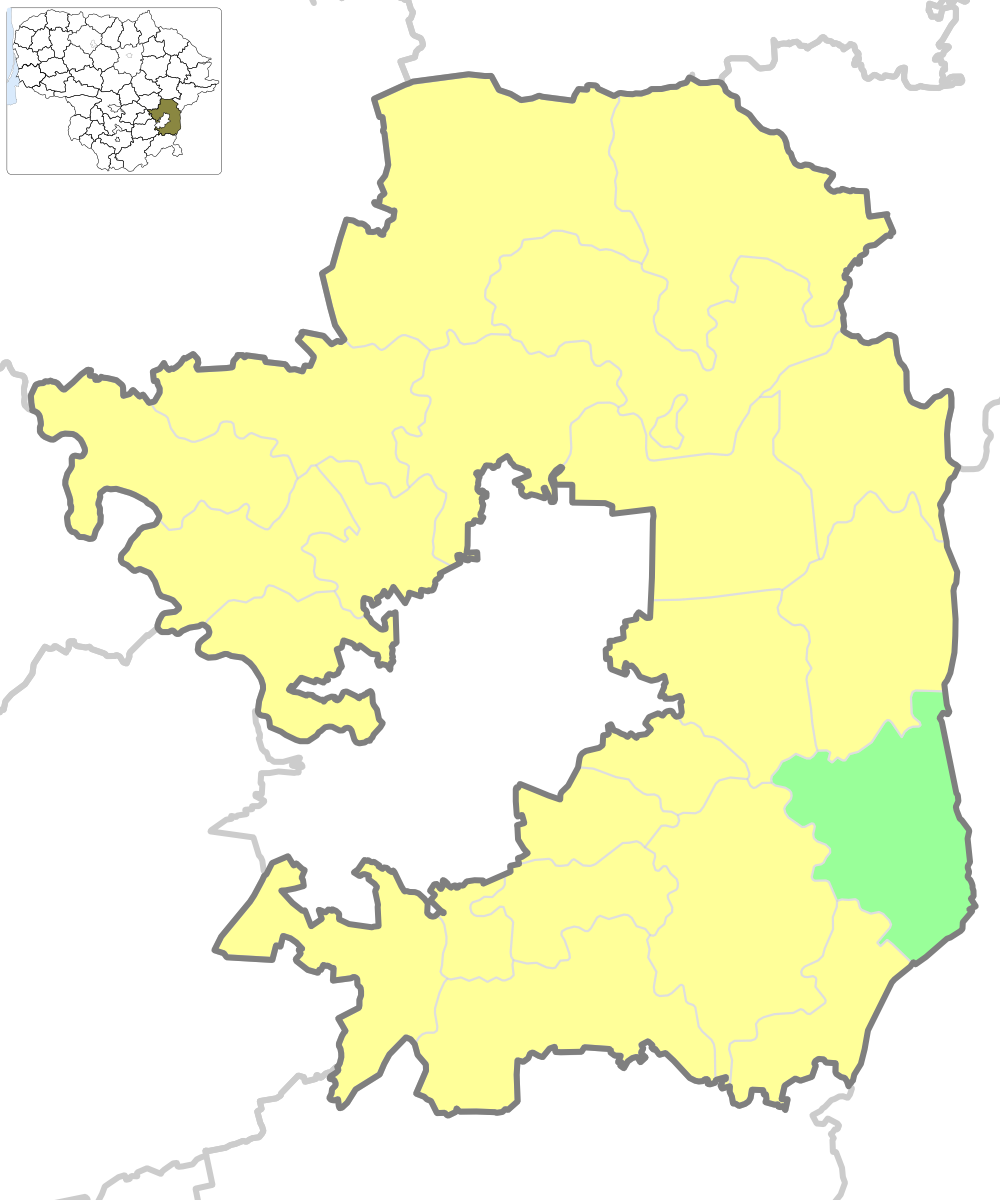
- Location of Kalveliai Eldership
- Country: Lithuania
- Ethnographic region: Dzūkija
- County: Vilnius County
- Municipality: Vilnius District Municipality
- Administrative centre: Kalveliai

Government
  - Elder: Kristina Gerasimovič

Area
  - Total: 119.91 km^{2} (46.30 sq mi)

Population (2019)
  - Total: 4,170
  - Density: 34.8/km^{2} (90.1/sq mi)
- Time zone: UTC+2 (EET)
  - Summer (DST): UTC+3 (EEST)
- Website: https://www.vrsa.lt

Kalveliai Eldership (Lithuanian: Kalvelių seniūnija) is an eldership in Lithuania, southeast of Vilnius District Municipality near the border with Belarus.

== History ==
The history of the village of Kalveliai started in late 19th century, while Šumskas was bought by landlord Kazimieras Šumskis in 1618, and was named after him. In 1696 his son established a church and a Dominican parish school. By 1789 the order had already built a new brick church which remains to this day.

In 2000, Kalveliai saw the construction of a new church, and in 2007 the first monument in Lithuania dedicated to Pope John Paul II was erected nearby.

== Economy ==
The most common fields of business are agriculture, forestry, services, fish industry and customs services.

== Populated places ==
The eldership comprises 32 villages, and the largest settlements are Kalveliai, Kena, Pakenė and Šumskas.

== Ethnic composition ==
According to the 2021 National Census, out of 3950 inhabitants:

- Poles – 2939 (74.4%)
- Lithuanians – 416 (10.5%)
- Belarusians – 255 (6.4%)
- Russians – 229 (5.8%)

According to the 2011 National Census:

- Poles – 75.7%
- Belarusians – 8.1%
- Lithuanians – 8.0%
- Russians – 5.9%

Kalveliai eldership before the 2010s was one of just few elderships in Lithuania where Lithuanians were not the dominant or the second largest ethnographic group, but the third. As population of Lithuanians is generally younger, while structurally Belarusian population's members in Lithuania are proportionally – much older, Lithuanian population in the eldership greatly outnumbered that of Belarusians in just some 10 years.

== Gallery ==
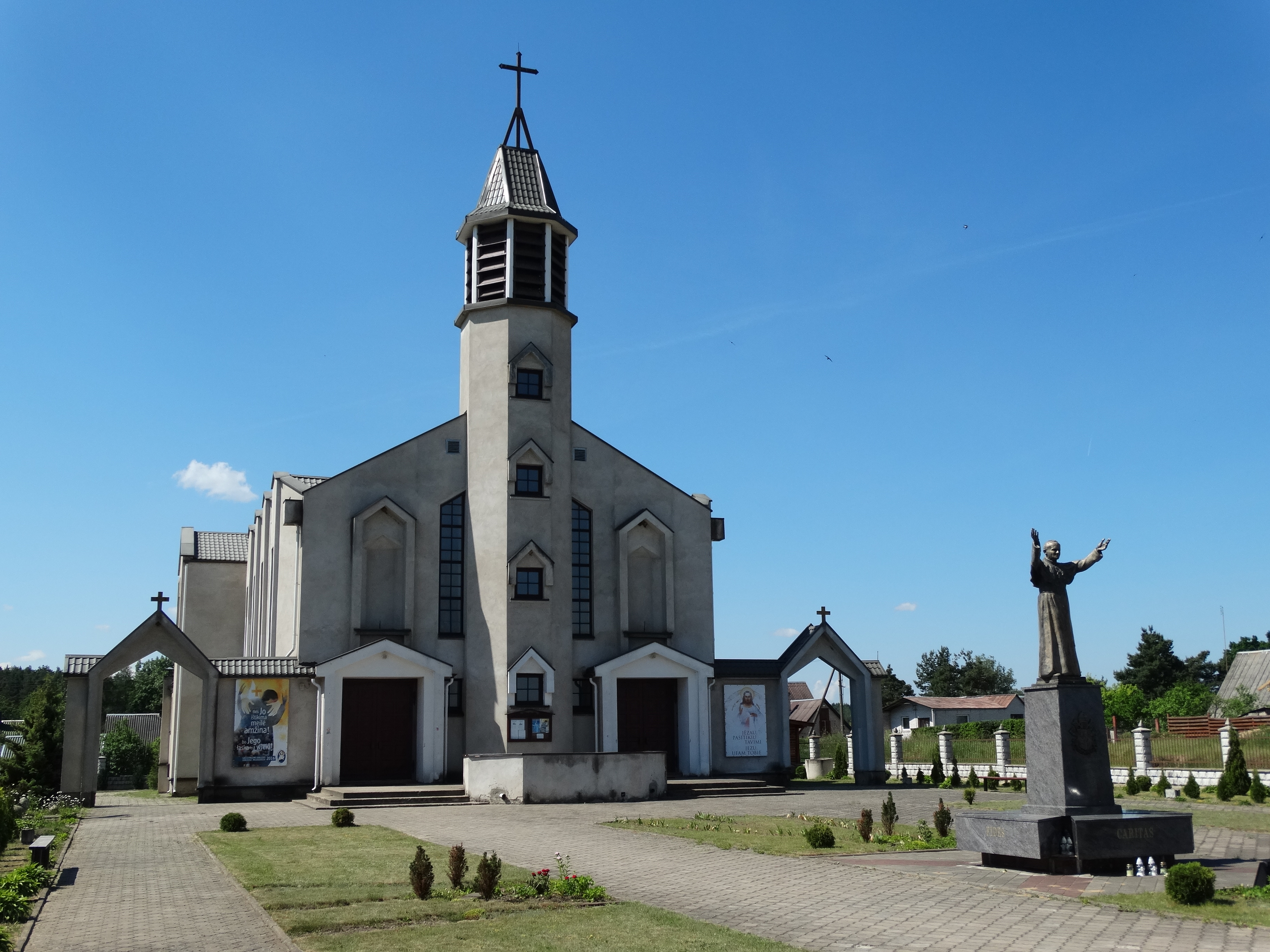
Church in Kalveliai

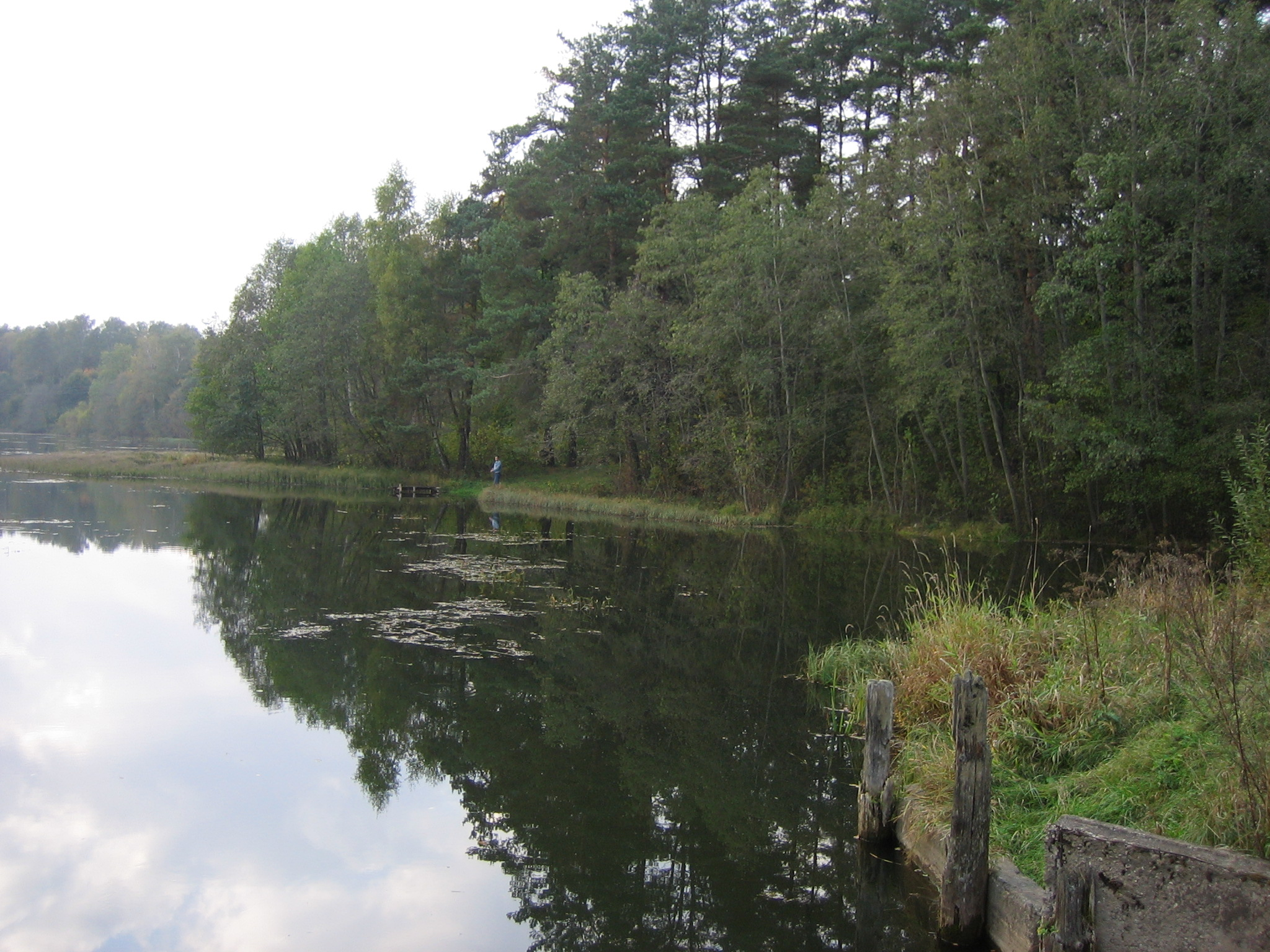
Juodė River near Kalveliai

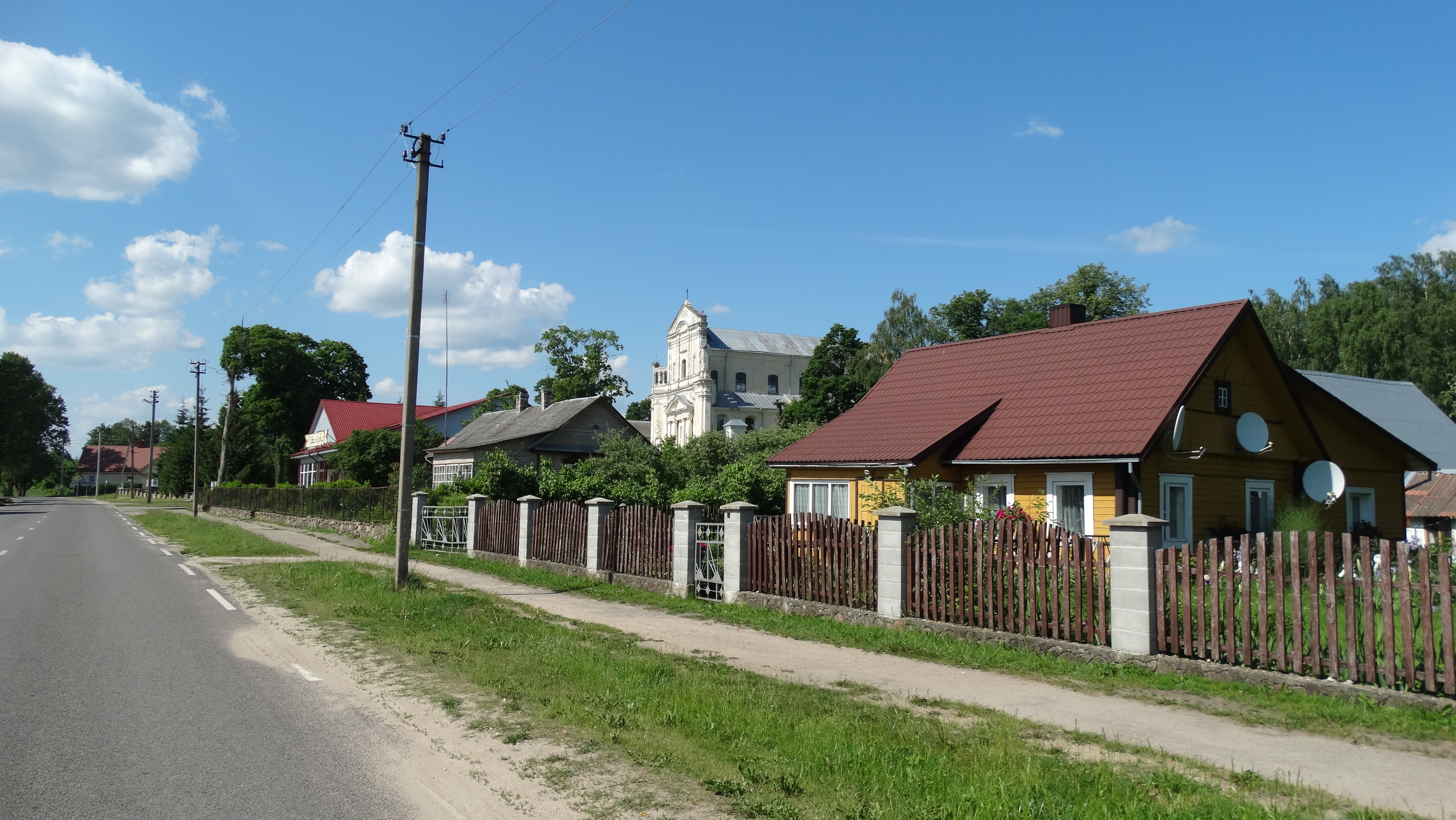
Šumskas in 2016

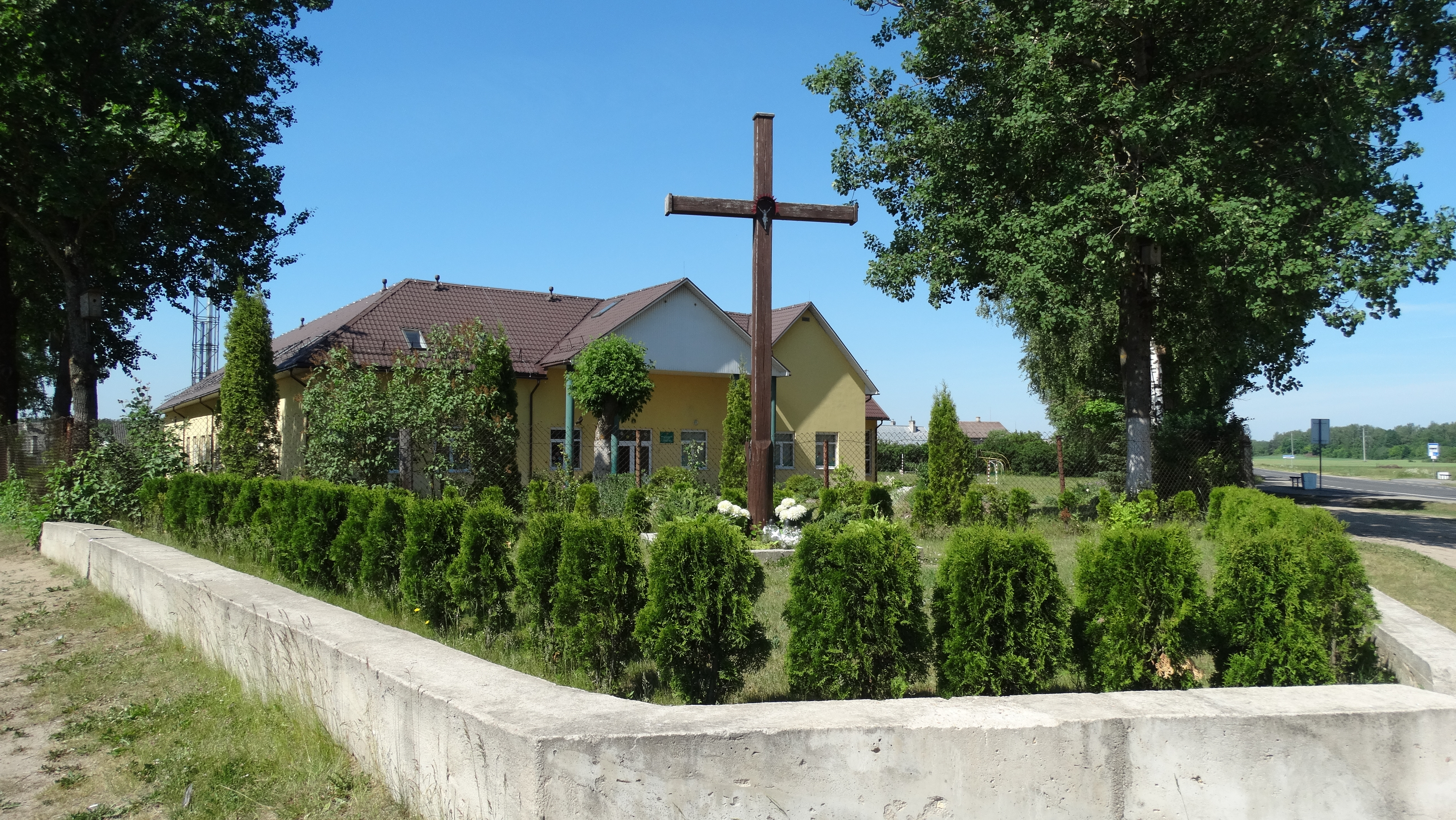
School and cross in Pakenė

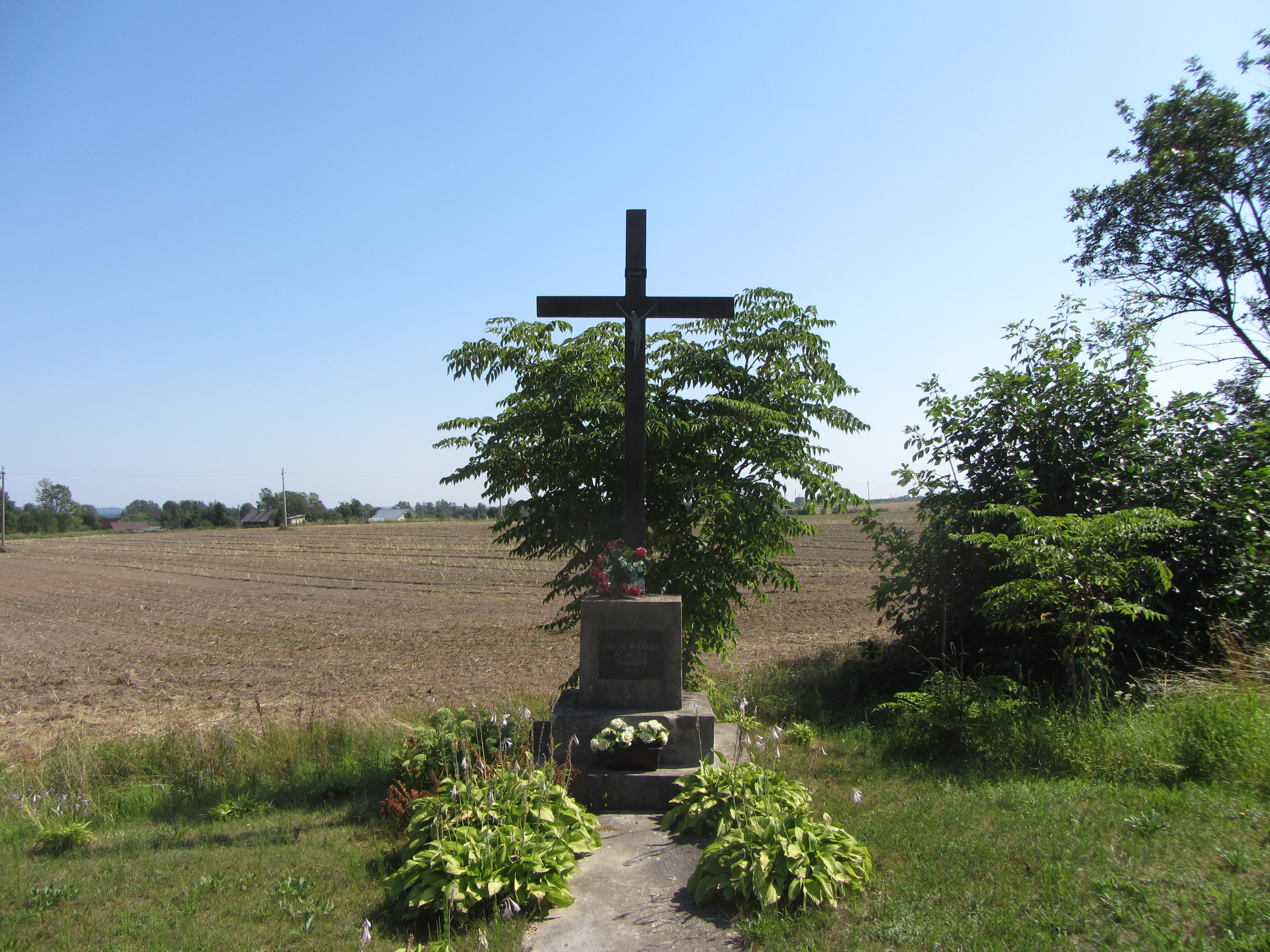
A wayside cross in the eldership
