= Viešvilė =

- Town
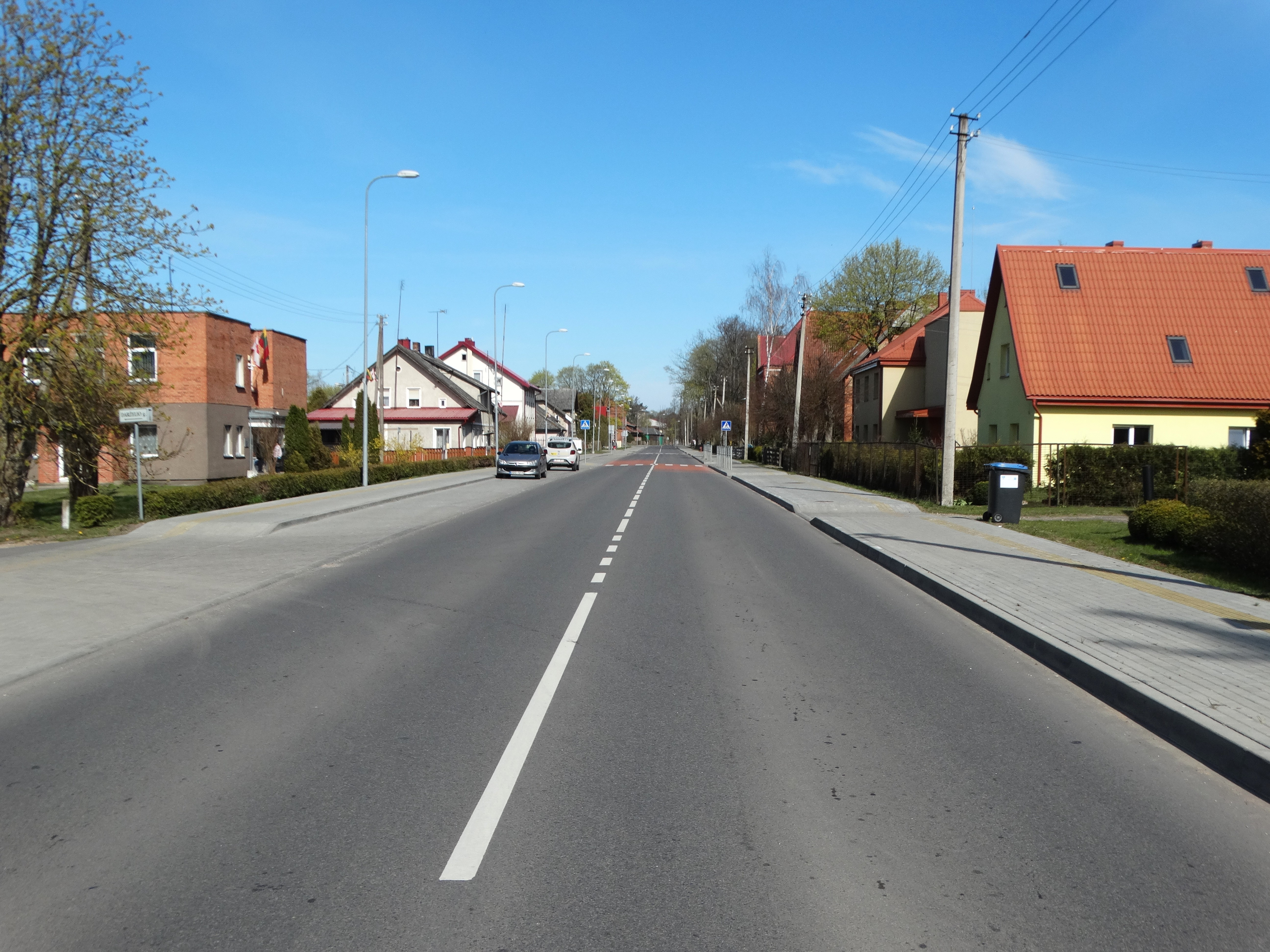

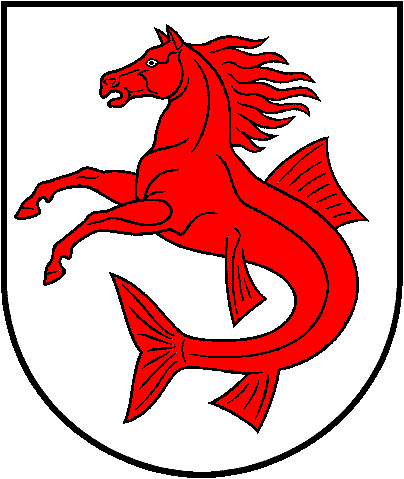
- Seal

- Location within Lithuania
- Coordinates: 55°4′20″N 22°23′0″E
- Country: Lithuania
- County: Tauragė County

Population (2011)
  - Total: 843
- Time zone: UTC+2 (EET)
  - Summer (DST): UTC+3 (EEST)

Viešvilė is a small town in Tauragė County, in western Lithuania. According to the 2011 census, the town has a population of 843 people.

== History ==
The Viešvilė River was first mentioned in 1385 in texts of the knights of the Teutonic Order traveling across the Baltic states. The settlement itself was mentioned in 1542. Viešvilė manor was documented in 1546.

In 1553, a church was constructed. By 1568, this was remade into the Viešvilė Evangelical Lutheran Church. In 1678, the priests of the church received a decree from the Regent of Prussia George Frederick, issuing that the church had an issue of idolatry and making animal sacrifices as offerings. In 1609, a separate parish was established for the church to mark it distinctly from others.

In 1665, the town was marked on a map showcasing East Prussia named the Ragainė County. During this same time, a dam was constructed on the Viešvilė River with a watermill nearby.

In the 18th–19th centuries, Viešvilė grew to a small industrial center for nearby towns. An oil mill and sawmill were constructed near to the watermill. A leather workshop operated from 1730. From 1767 to 1885, a paper mill operated in the town owned by the Riedel family.

In 1900–1943, another sawmill was operating in the town with 40,000 cubic metres (1,400,000 cu ft) to 80,000 cubic metres (2,800,000 cu ft) being cut annually. By this point, the town had around 1,400 inhabitants.

In 1930, a cemetery was discovered in the southwestern part of the town dating back to the 10th–11th centuries.

Under the Soviet Union, from around 1925–1930, a secondary school, auxiliary school, agricultural school, and children's boarding home were constructed. Soviet military units were also stationed nearby the Viešvilė forest.

== Gallery ==
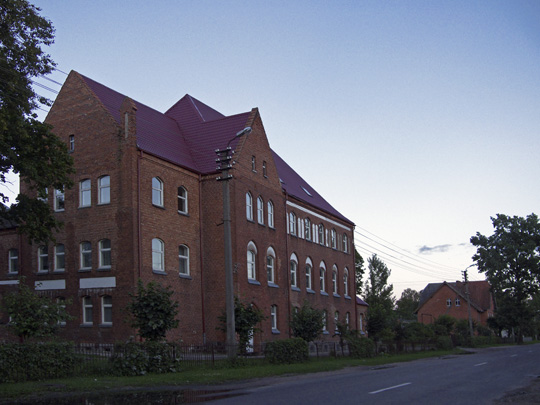
Former court palace

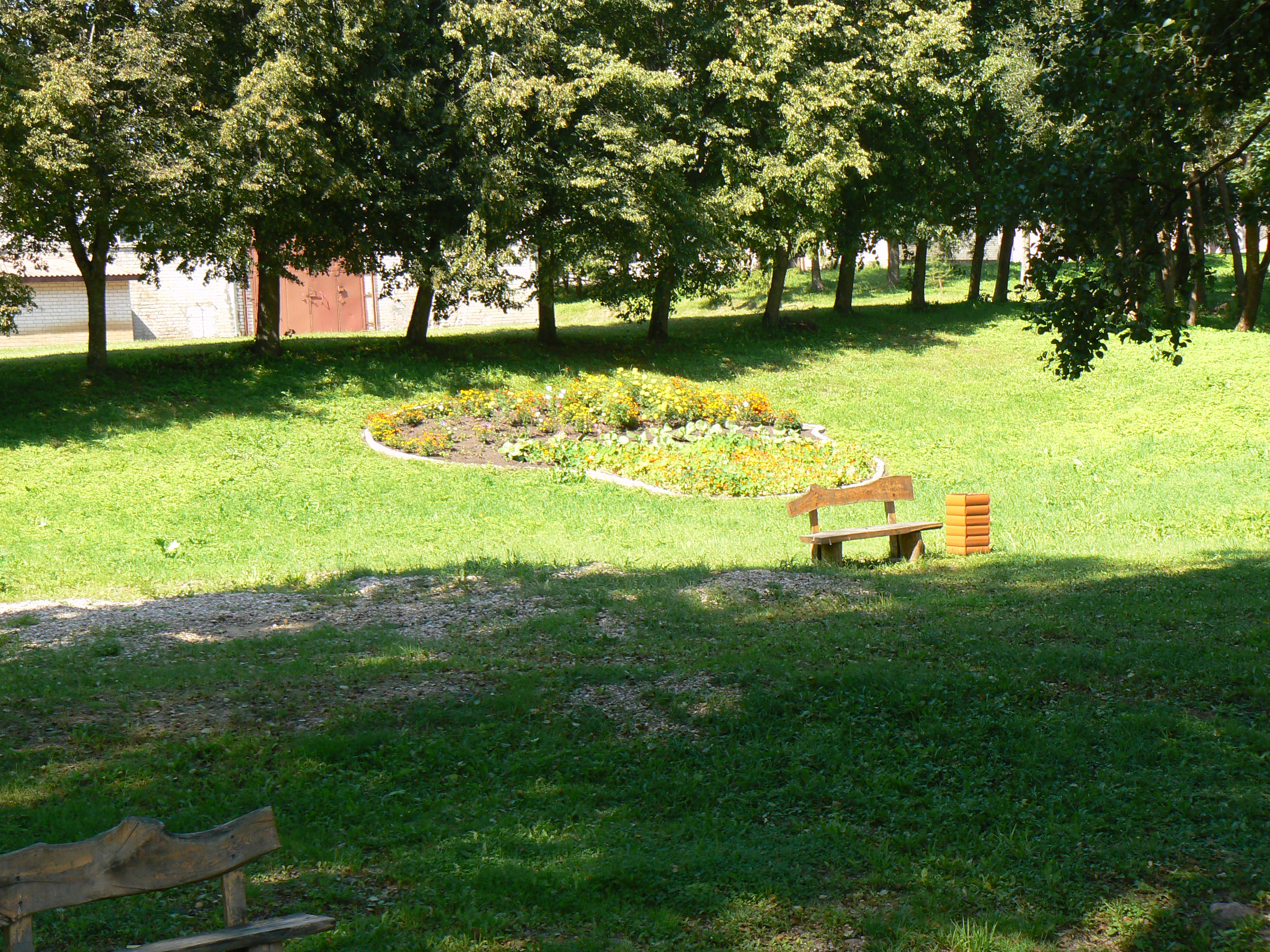
Park

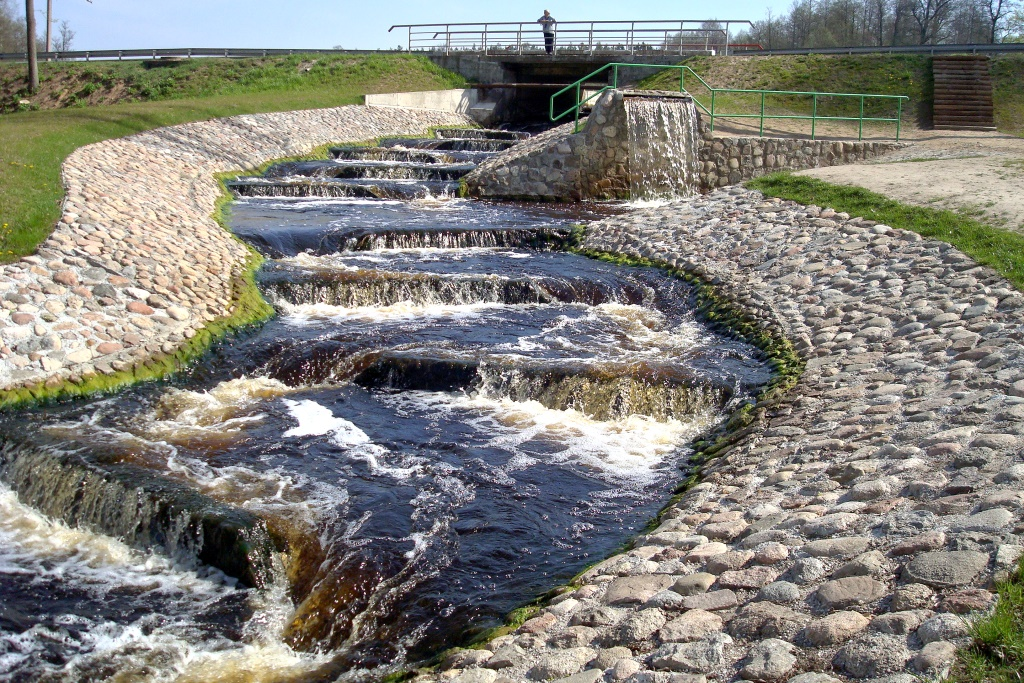
Fish ladder

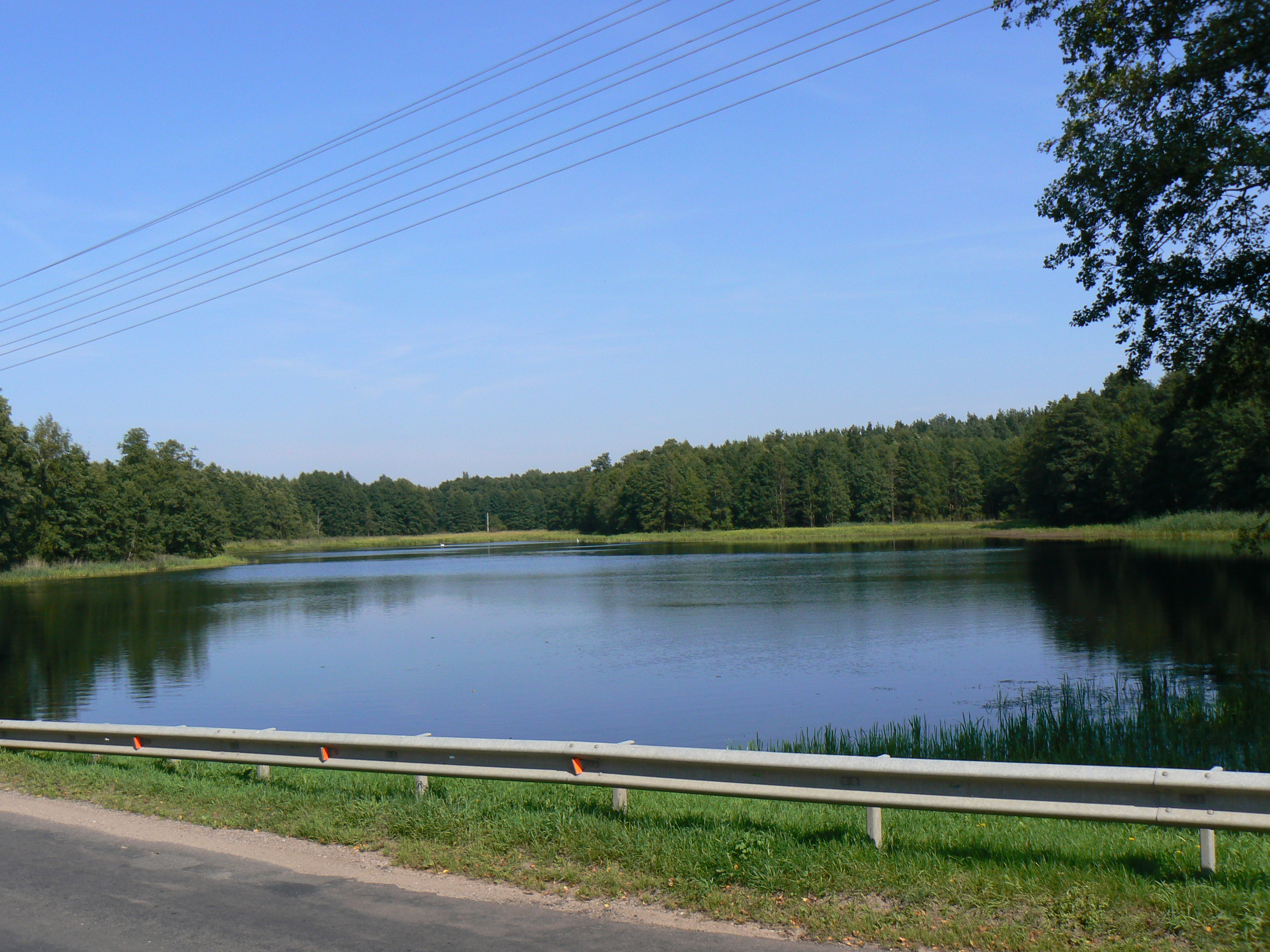
Gulbinų pound
