= Vadžgirys =

- Town
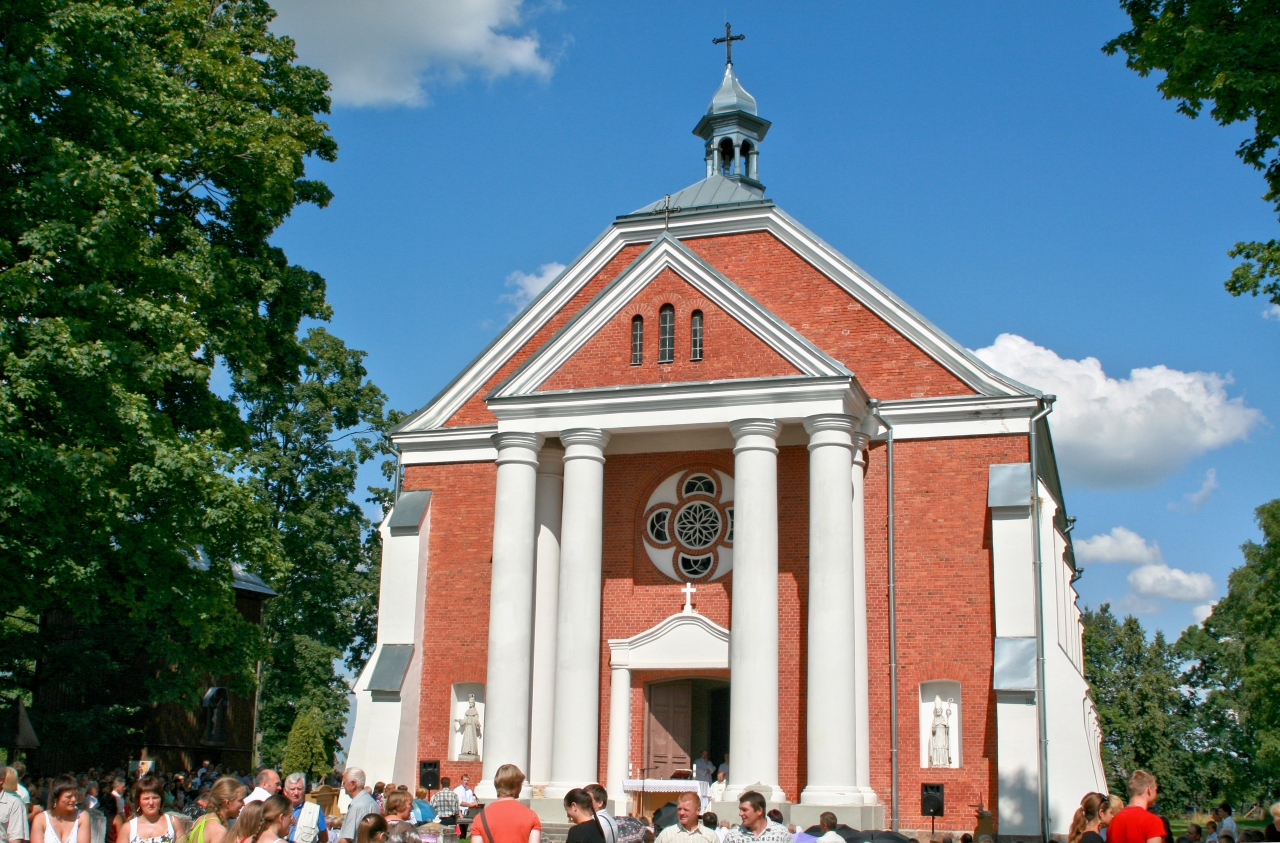

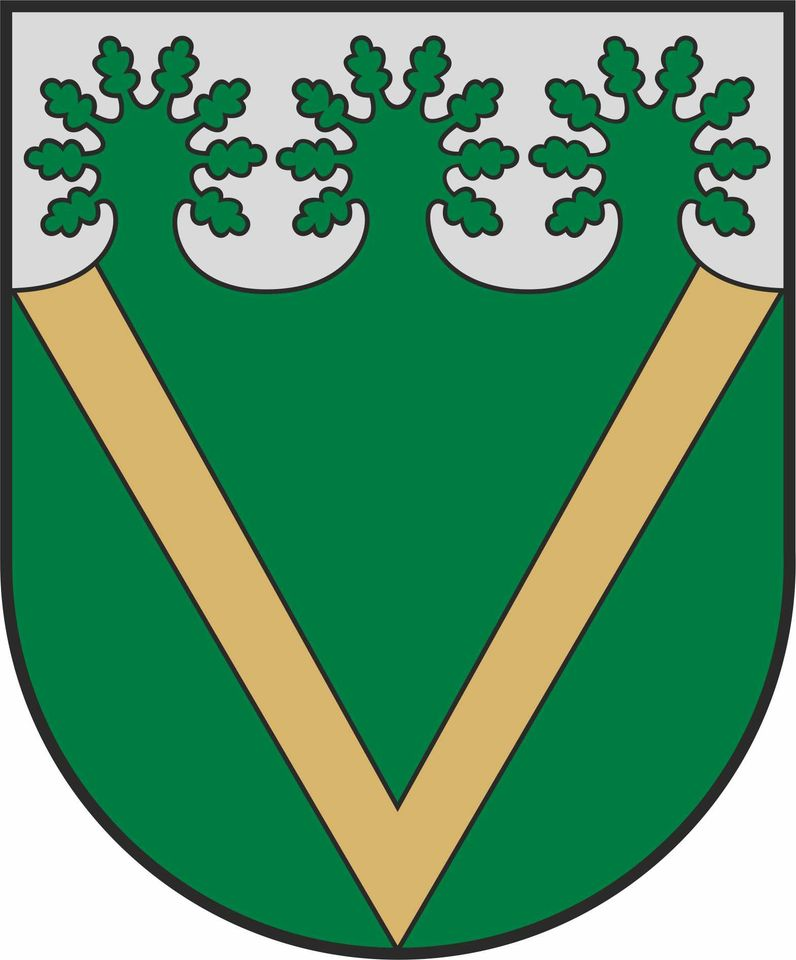
- Coat of arms

- Location within Lithuania
- Coordinates: 55°15′10″N 22°15′10″E
- Country: Lithuania
- County: Tauragė County

Population (2011)
  - Total: 440
- Time zone: UTC+2 (EET)
  - Summer (DST): UTC+3 (EEST)

Vadžgirys is a small town in Tauragė County, in western Lithuania. According to the 2024 census, the town has a population of 420 people.

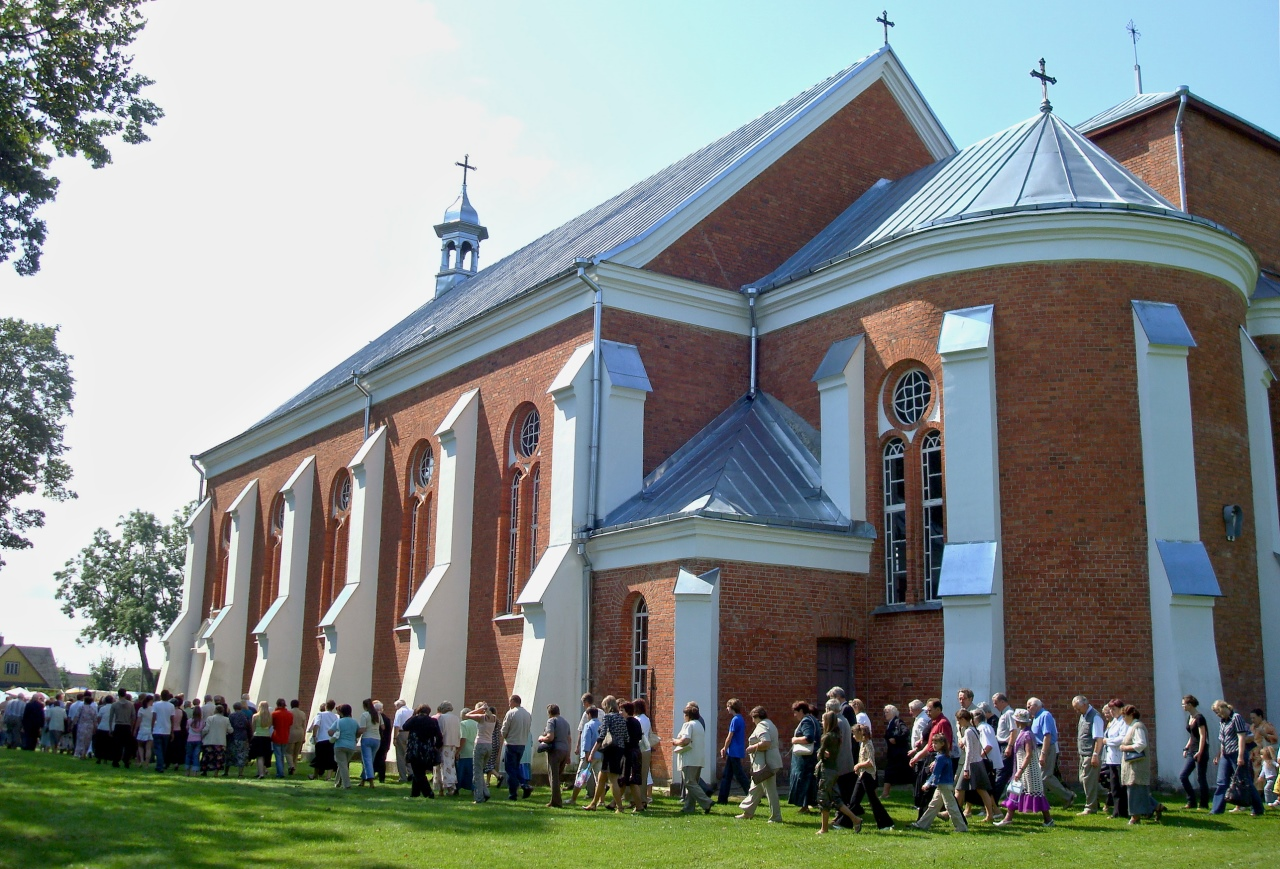
Back of the Vadžgirys church
