= Klevinė =

- Village
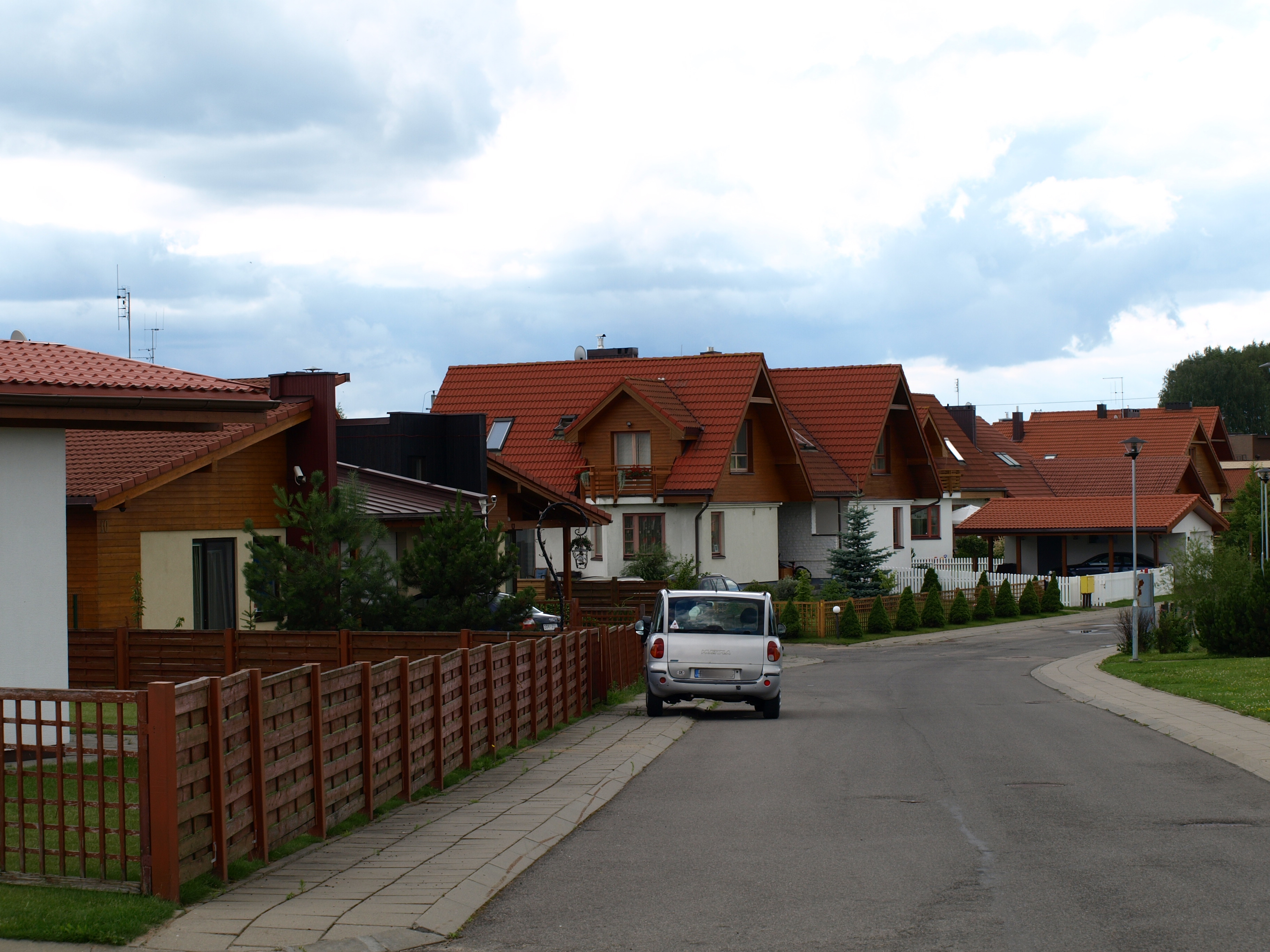
- Klevinė

- Location of Klevinė
- Coordinates: 54°46′52″N 25°11′35″E
- Country: Lithuania
- County: Vilnius County
- Municipality: Vilnius District Municipality
- Eldership: Avižieniai Eldership

Population (2021)
  - Total: 931
- Time zone: UTC+2 (EET)
  - Summer (DST): UTC+3 (EEST)

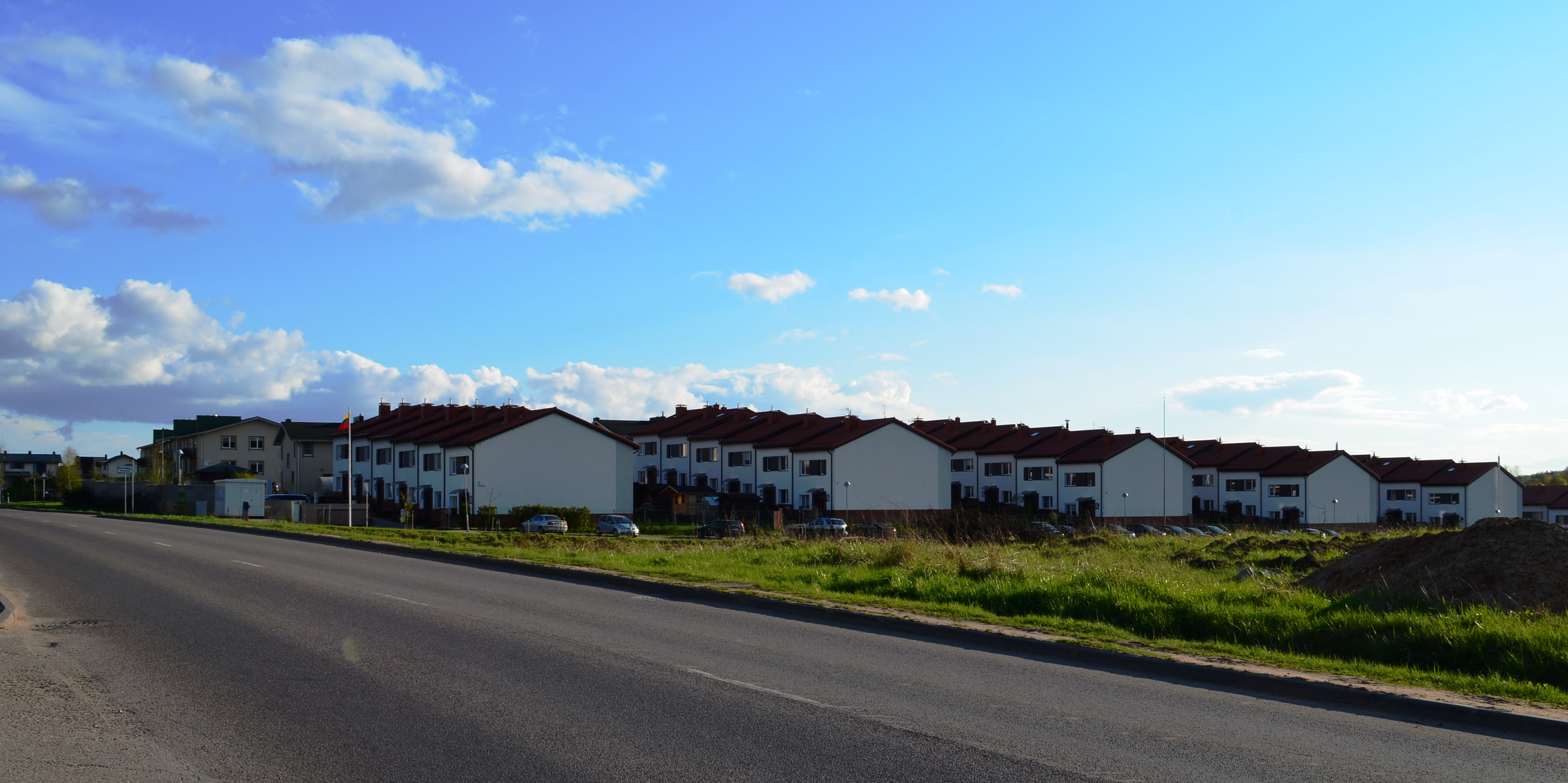
Rows of suburban Semi-detached houses in Klevinė

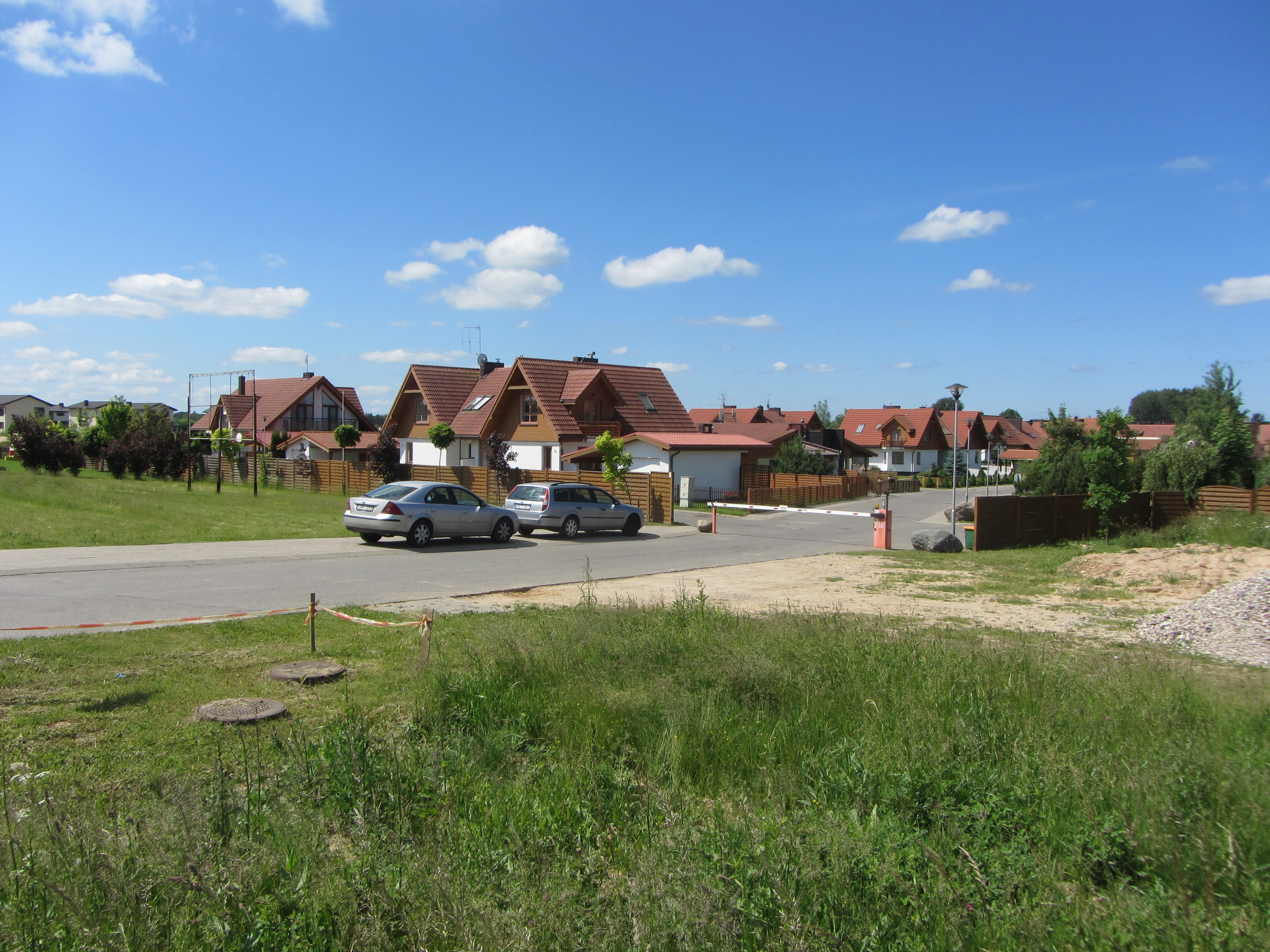
Single family houses in Klevinė

Klevinė is a village in Avižieniai Eldership, Vilnius District Municipality, Lithuania. It is located just north of Vilnius, on the old road Vilnius–Ukmergė, intergrown with Bendoriai. At the 2021 census, the village had a population of 931, an increase, compared to 2011 census, which recorded 426 inhabitants. That was an increase from the 2001 census which recorded the population of only 14. This means, that in 20 years, the number of population of Klevinė grew 6650% or on average – 333% a year. Klevinė belongs to the suburban belt of Vilnius, which faces unprecedented growth during the last two decades. Rows of semi-detached houses as well as stand-alone houses are being built in the village for newcomer residents from Vilnius.
