= Kalveliai =

- Town
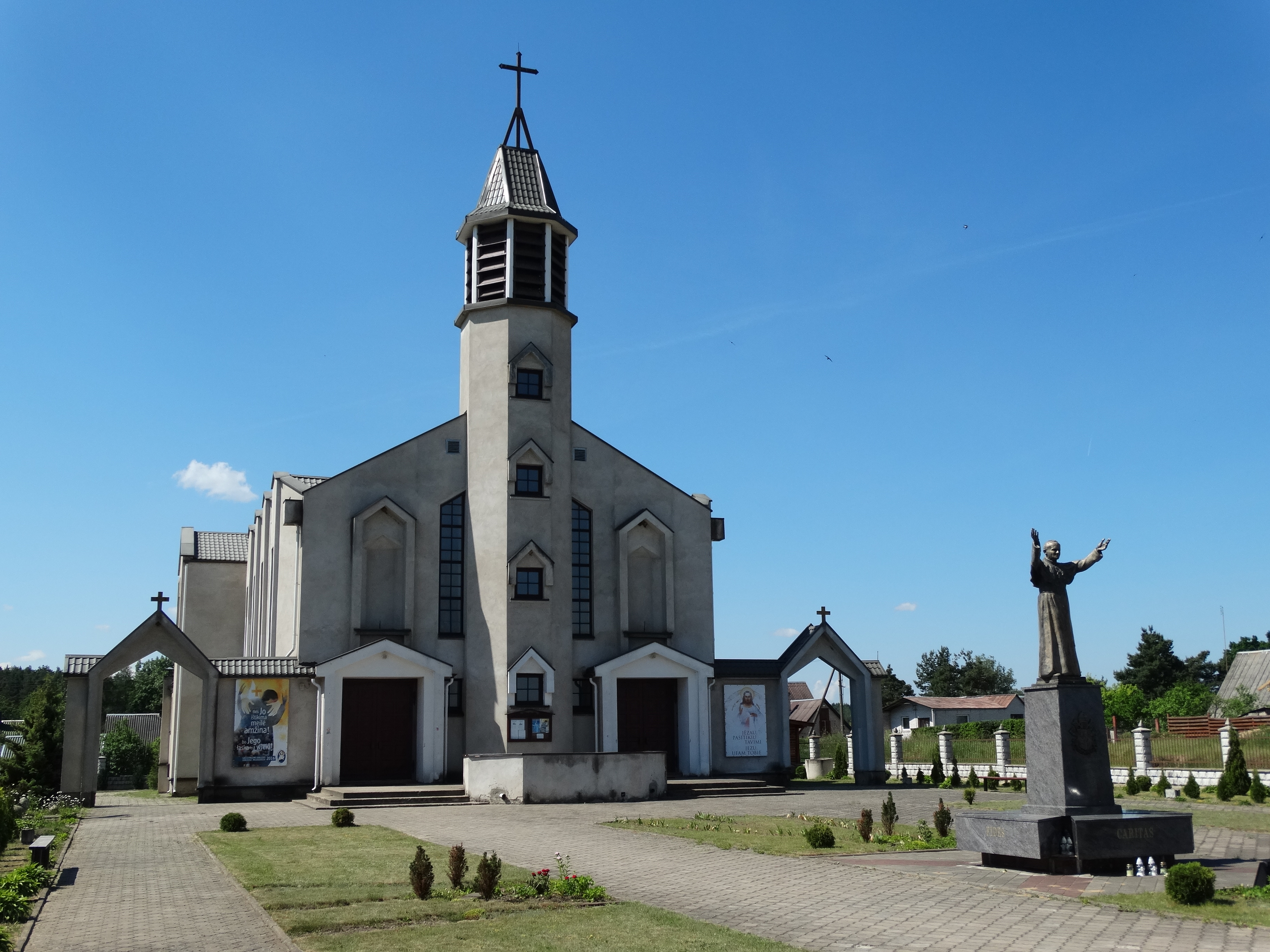
- Church of Kalveliai

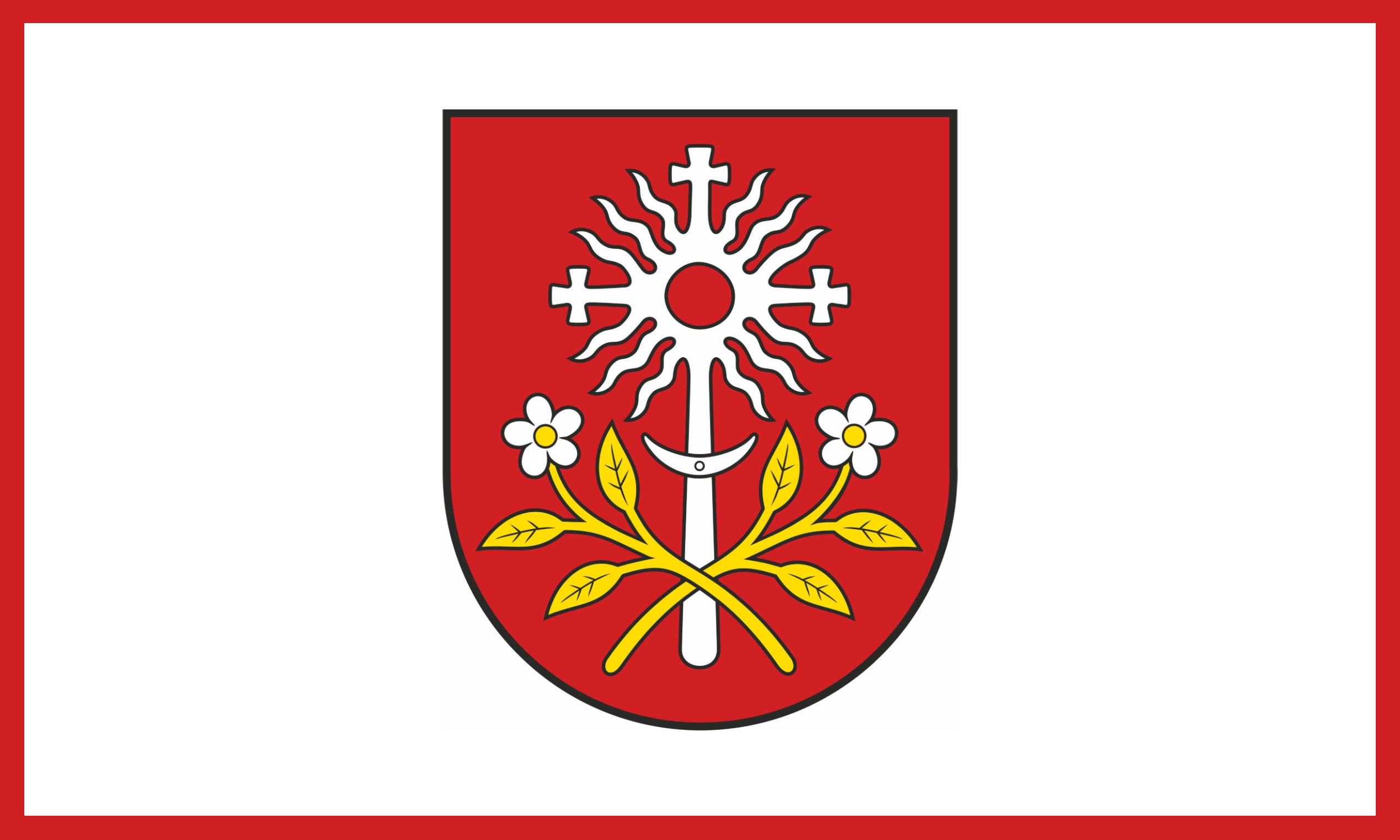
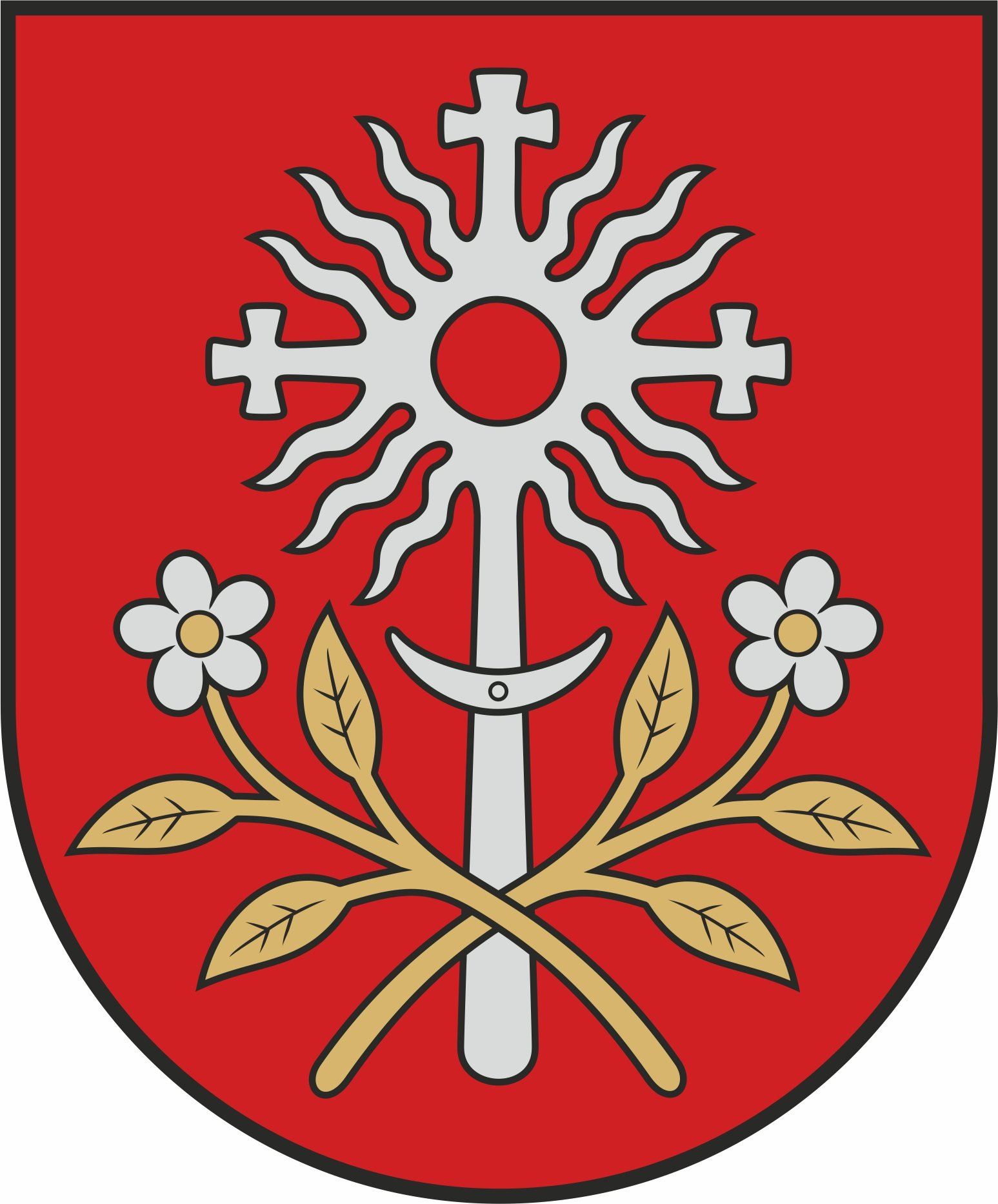
- Flag Coat of arms

- Location of Kalveliai
- Coordinates: 54°38′20″N 25°41′10″E
- Country: Lithuania
- County: Vilnius County
- Municipality: Vilnius District Municipality
- Eldership: Kalveliai Eldership
- Capital of: Kalveliai Eldership

Population (2021)
  - Total: 1,502
- Time zone: UTC+2 (EET)
  - Summer (DST): UTC+3 (EEST)

Kalveliai is a town in Vilnius District Municipality, Lithuania, it is located only about 20 kilometres (12 mi) east of Vilnius city municipality. According to the 2021 census, it had population of 1502, a decrease from 1592, counted by 2011 census and a 26% decrease from 2021 inhabitants, counted by the 1989 census.
