= Tauragė District Municipality =

Tauragė district municipality Tauragės rajono savivaldybė
- Municipality
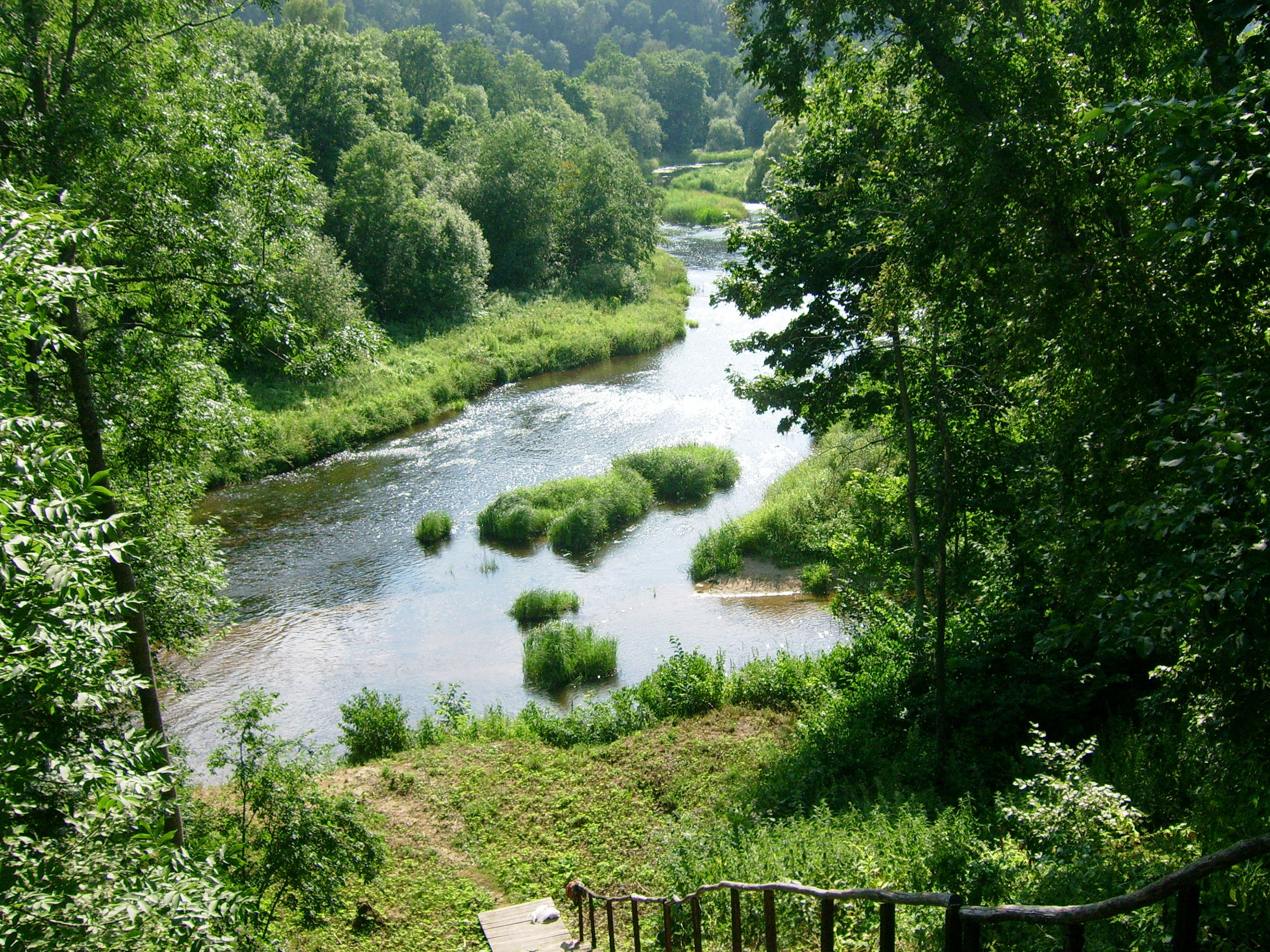
- Jūra and Akmena confluence

- Flag Coat of arms Brandmark

- Location in Lithuania

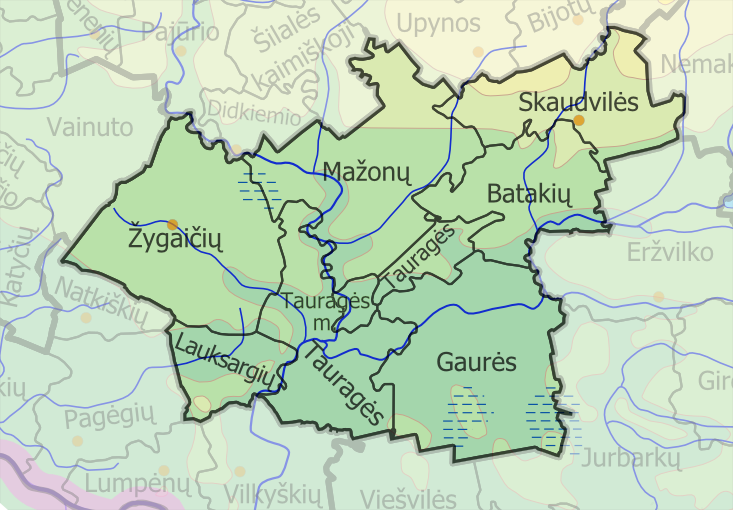
- Map of Tauragė district municipality
- Coordinates: 55°17′53″N 22°21′11″E
- Country: Lithuania
- Ethnographic region: Samogitia
- County: Tauragė
- Capital: Tauragė
- Elderships: 8

Area
  - Total: 1,179 km^{2} (455 sq mi)
  - Rank: 33rd

Population (2021)
  - Total: 38,002
  - Rank: 14th
  - Density: 32.23/km^{2} (83.48/sq mi)
  - Rank: 16th
- Time zone: UTC+2 (EET)
  - Summer (DST): UTC+3 (EEST)
- Telephone code: 446
- Major settlements: Tauragė (pop. 21,203); Skaudvilė (pop. 1,410)
- Website: www.taurage.lt

Tauragė District Municipality (Lithuanian: Tauragės rajono savivaldybė) is a municipality in Tauragė County, Lithuania

Famous landmarks include Tauragė Castle and Panemunė Castle.

== Seniūnijos (Elderships or Wards) ==
The Tauragė District Municipality is divided into 8 elderships seniūnijos); the main town or village is listed for each.

1. Batakiai Eldership – Batakiai
2. Gaurė Eldership – Gaurė
3. Lauksargiai Eldership – Lauksargiai
4. Mažonai Eldership – Mažonai
5. Skaudvilė Eldership – Skaudvilė
6. Tauragė Eldership – Tauragė
7. Tauragė City Eldership – Tauragė
8. Žygaičiai Eldership – Žygaičiai

== Population by locality ==
2011 Census
Locality	Status	Total	Male	Female
Tauragės d. mun.		43,853	20,162	23,691
Batakiai Eldership		1,392	640	752
Akstinai	K	57	26	31
Antegluonis	K	26	12	14
Balčiškė	K	29	16	13
Batakiai	GST	91	43	48
Batakiai	K	69	36	33
Batakiai	MST	246	109	137
Bildeniai	K	68	34	34
Čiuteikiai	K	44	21	23
Eidintai	K	252	104	148
Ferma	K	0	0	0
Gerviečiai	K	38	21	17
Gryblaukis	K	16	8	8
Karklotė	K	0	0	0
Kerteniai	K	0	0	0
Kundročiai	K	30	14	16
Lankininkai	K	15	6	9
Liaudginai	K	25	10	15
Mažintai	K	56	23	33
Melagiškė	K	12	7	5
Mickiškė	K	10	4	6
Mozeriškė	K	5	2	3
Norkiškė	K	189	87	102
Ožnugariai	K	10	5	5
Paegluonis	K	15	9	6
Paltiniškė	K	23	10	13
Pašešuvis	K	6	4	2
Pužiškė	K	19	11	8
Santakai	K	0	0	0
Šiaudinė	K	32	14	18
Šiurpiškė	K	5	2	3
Užkerteniai	K	4	2	2
Užšešuviai	K	0	0	0
Gaurė Eldership		2,424	1,147	1,277
Aneliškė	K	22	12	10
Ąžuolynė	K	29	14	15
Balandžiai	K	7	5	2
Baltrušaičiai	K	365	171	194
Bernotiškė	K	34	17	17
Braziškiai	K	0	0	0
Burbiškiai	K	0	0	0
Dargaičiai	K	42	19	23
Deferencija	K	3	2	1
Drūtaviškiai	K	9	4	5
Dvarviečiai	K	19	8	11
Eičiai	K	379	159	220
Gailiškė	K	0	0	0
Gauraičiai	K	26	10	16
Gaurė	K	1	1	0
Gaurė	MST	418	195	223
Girgždai	K	36	20	16
Jucaičiai	K	27	11	16
Kiukiškiai	K	0	0	0
Kunigiškiai	K	329	157	172
Liperiškė	K	3	1	2
Liutkaičiai	K	4	2	2
Lybiškiai	K	0	0	0
Meižiai	K	6	2	4
Meškai	K	20	11	9
Milaičiai	K	62	30	32
Milgaudžiai	K	145	78	67
Padrūtupiai	K	27	14	13
Paįkojai	K	18	9	9
Pameižiai	K	0	0	0
Pamiliušiai	K	4	2	2
Pasalupis	K	1	1	0
Pypaliai	K	0	0	0
Platkepuriai	K	0	0	0
Puikiai	K	7	3	4
Purviškiai	K	1	0	1
Sakalinė	K	70	36	34
Stirbaičiai	K	61	29	32
Stragutė	K	130	69	61
Šiauriškiai	K	18	11	7
Traklaukas	K	11	4	7
Užvarniai	K	5	3	2
Užvėjai	K	2	1	1
Vėžaičiai	K	12	7	5
Zaltriškiai	K	33	15	18
Zuikiškiai	K	15	6	9
Žiburiai	K	23	8	15
Lauksargiai Eldership		1,271	618	653
Aukštvilkiai	K	68	29	39
Gilandviršiai	K	18	10	8
Greižėnai	K	26	14	12
Griežpelkiai I	K	91	46	45
Griežpelkiai II	K	55	28	27
Kalėnai	K	60	31	29
Kamščiai	K	36	21	15
Kregždėnai	K	22	11	11
Kreivėnai	K	4	2	2
Lauksargiai	K	622	295	327
Meldiklaukiai	K	18	8	10
Nemeilai	K	8	3	5
Oplankys	K	52	21	31
Steponiškiai	K	5	2	3
Šakiai	K	159	84	75
Žilučiai	K	27	13	14
Mažonai Eldership		3,120	1,498	1,622
Alijošiškės	K	68	38	30
Antšunijai	K	5	2	3
Balskai	K	26	13	13
Debliai	K	0	0	0
Devynakiai	K	2	1	1
Galmenai	K	105	52	53
Geniai	K	12	6	6
Griaužai	K	39	15	24
Gudlaukis	K	11	5	6
Jatkantaliai	K	5	3	2
Karapolis	K	40	20	20
Kasbarynai	K	22	9	13
Kaziškė	K	0	0	0
Kelmynė	K	5	2	3
Kuturiai	K	1	0	1
Leoniškė	K	33	18	15
Lėkiškė	K	3	0	3
Lylavėnai	K	27	12	15
Lomiai	K	306	145	161
Matiškiai	K	15	5	10
Mažonai	K	495	231	264
Mineikiškiai	K	0	0	0
Mišeikiai	K	18	8	10
Naujininkai	K	0	0	0
Norkaičiai	K	295	141	154
Pagirupis	K	74	39	35
Pagramantalis	K	0	0	0
Pagramantis	MST	434	199	235
Papušynė	K	222	104	118
Reksčiai	K	6	4	2
Rekstukai	K	20	12	8
Ridikiškė	K	21	11	10
Ringaliai	K	47	25	22
Ringiai	K	81	43	38
Selmoniškiai	K	7	3	4
Siaurkampis	K	0	0	0
Sungailiškiai	K	219	107	112
Sutkai	K	32	16	16
Šakvietis	K	134	69	65
Šaukėnai	K	17	9	8
Tamošaičiai	K	0	0	0
Trakšeliškiai	K	16	9	7
Treinoji	K	101	44	57
Tuščiai	K	15	9	6
Uosvietis	K	14	7	7
Užbūdupis	K	3	2	1
Vaitimėnai	K	58	30	28
Vėžalaukis	K	6	2	4
Visbutai	K	60	28	32
Zuikiškė	K	0	0	0
Skaudvilė Eldership		3,811	1,744	2,067
Adakavas I	K	548	268	280
Adakavas II	K	0	0	0
Angladegiai	K	0	0	0
Barsukynė	K	14	8	6
Beresniškė	K	0	0	0
Beržynė	K	3	1	2
Bokšeiniai	K	9	6	3
Brūžaičiai	K	8	2	6
Būgai	K	15	8	7
Būteniai	K	82	37	45
Cigelnė	K	0	0	0
Daujotėliai	K	3	1	2
Dvarviečiai	K	15	4	11
Gedgaudiškė	K	72	35	37
Gilvičiai	K	22	10	12
Giržadai	K	41	17	24
Ivangėnai	K	24	10	14
Jakutiškė	K	45	20	25
Jakštai	K	26	13	13
Juškaičiai	K	9	4	5
Juškiškė	K	6	4	2
Kalniškiai	K	44	19	25
Karšuva	K	8	4	4
Kavadoniai	K	16	7	9
Keteriai	K	37	12	25
Kirkliai	K	28	15	13
Kuksinė	K	2	1	1
Lauraičiai	K	0	0	0
Laurinaičiai	K	2	1	1
Leliškė	K	12	7	5
Margynė	K	0	0	0
Mikalaičiai	K	2	1	1
Mockaičiai	K	0	0	0
Motaičiai	K	0	0	0
Nosaičiai	K	2	1	1
Očikiai	K	35	18	17
Pabambiai	K	7	3	4
Paegluonis (Skaudvilės)	K	12	3	9
Paklevis	K	14	6	8
Paplėstiškė	K	17	10	7
Paprūdžiai	K	1	1	0
Papušyniai	K	13	6	7
Pasuvirkštis	K	2	2	0
Pauliškiai	K	2	1	1
Paupynis	K	0	0	0
Pavartis	K	30	19	11
Paverkalnis	K	2	1	1
Pilsūdai	K	246	119	127
Plingės	K	4	1	3
Pužai	K	88	40	48
Puželiai	K	35	19	16
Ruibiškė	K	11	6	5
Rūdija	K	17	6	11
Sauslaukis	K	9	4	5
Skaudvilė	M	1,720	748	972
Sniegoniškė I	K	9	3	6
Sniegoniškė II	K	0	0	0
Sodalė	K	50	23	27
Šidagiai	K	125	62	63
Trepai	K	189	92	97
Užkalniai	K	0	0	0
Vaidatoniai	K	0	0	0
Vėluikiai	K	42	18	24
Vilnaliai	K	19	8	11
Zakarkiškė	K	12	7	5
Žaliūkė	K	5	2	3
Žvirzdė	K	0	0	0
Tauragė City Eldership		24,389	10,907	13,482
Tauragė	M	24,389	10,907	13,482
Tauragė Eldership		4,835	2,355	2,480
Alanga	K	10	4	6
Antgurkliai	K	0	0	0
Balandiškiai	K	2	1	1
Baltramiejiškiai	K	33	16	17
Beigeriškiai	K	5	2	3
Bekeriškiai	K	0	0	0
Bimbilinė	K	2	1	1
Butkeliai	K	488	231	257
Ceikiškė	K	16	8	8
Dacijonai	K	301	137	164
Dagiai	K	2	1	1
Dapkiškiai	K	361	182	179
Dauglaukis	K	314	158	156
Drąslaukis	K	22	9	13
Dunokai	K	25	14	11
Dvarelis	K	17	12	5
Dvarviečiai	K	2	0	2
Grineidžiai	K	48	25	23
Gurkliai	K	30	14	16
Jatkančiai	K	135	68	67
Jociai	K	25	14	11
Joniškė	K	382	205	177
Juodpetriai	K	294	146	148
Kalniškiai	K	7	5	2
Kalpokai	K	25	13	12
Kraštinė	K	8	5	3
Kuisiai	K	56	24	32
Lapynai	K	15	6	9
Lapurvis	K	40	21	19
Laužas	K	0	0	0
Lengveniai	K	12	5	7
Ližiai	K	19	8	11
Lukšiškiai	K	0	0	0
Meldikviršiai	K	68	32	36
Mąsčiai	K	9	4	5
Molynai	K	27	12	15
Molupis	K	60	30	30
Oreliškiai	K	0	0	0
Paberžiai	K	9	5	4
Pajūris	K	50	27	23
Pakalpokiai	K	4	2	2
Pašešuvis	K	10	6	4
Petkaičiai	K	12	7	5
Plikiškė	K	11	6	5
Požerūnai	K	81	37	44
Rūgaliai	K	32	14	18
Skirgailai	K	148	78	70
Sodalė	K	6	2	4
Staiginė	K	27	17	10
Šakiai	K	3	1	2
Šaltaičiai	K	2	2	0
Šilinė	K	7	3	4
Tarailiai	K	31	18	13
Taurai	K	1,451	671	780
Trakininkai	K	19	10	9
Trakšeliškiai	K	0	0	0
Trūkiškė	K	23	10	13
Vališkiai	K	3	2	1
Vitkaičiai	K	25	11	14
Voveraičiai	K	2	2	0
Žadgailai	K	19	11	8
Žygaičiai Eldership		2,611	1,253	1,358
Aukštupiai	K	350	167	183
Balčiai	K	51	23	28
Butkai	K	31	11	20
Būdviečiai	K	89	42	47
Dabrupinė	K	8	4	4
Dirvėnai	K	57	28	29
Draudeniai	K	98	49	49
Gaudaičiai	K	11	5	6
Girininkai	K	21	12	9
Kaupiai	K	5	2	3
Kęsčiai	K	229	117	112
Lapkasės	K	0	0	0
Laužininkai	K	3	2	1
Lazdynė	K	8	3	5
Leikiškiai	K	45	17	28
Margiškiai	K	0	0	0
Murdeliai	K	2	0	2
Pabūdviečiai	K	21	10	11
Palolytis	K	0	0	0
Pašikšniai	K	0	0	0
Pryšmantai I	K	33	18	15
Pryšmantai II	K	22	8	14
Putokšliai	K	35	16	19
Ringiniai	K	0	0	0
Ruikiai	K	37	16	21
Sartininkai	K	335	173	162
Skiržemė	K	101	47	54
Stirbaičiai	K	0	0	0
Stirbaitynė	K	44	24	20
Stokaičiai	K	35	19	16
Šikšniai	K	140	67	73
Trumpininkai	K	18	10	8
Trumpiškiai	K	21	7	14
Urviniai	K	0	0	0
Užpelkiai	K	0	0	0
Vaidilai	K	10	5	5
Vaitiškė	K	3	1	2
Vilaičiai	K	17	8	9
Visbarai	K	168	75	93
Vylūsčiai	K	12	5	7
Zoliškiai	K	9	4	5
Žygaičiai	MST	542	258	284

- Status: M, MST – city, town / K, GST – village / VS – steading
