= Gaure =

Gaure may refer to:

- Gaurė, a town in Tauragė County, Lithuania
- Gauré, a commune in Haute-Garonne, France

== See also ==
- Gaur (disambiguation)
- Guare, a surname
- Goure, commune and town in Zinder Region, southeastern Niger
