= Žygaičiai =

- Town
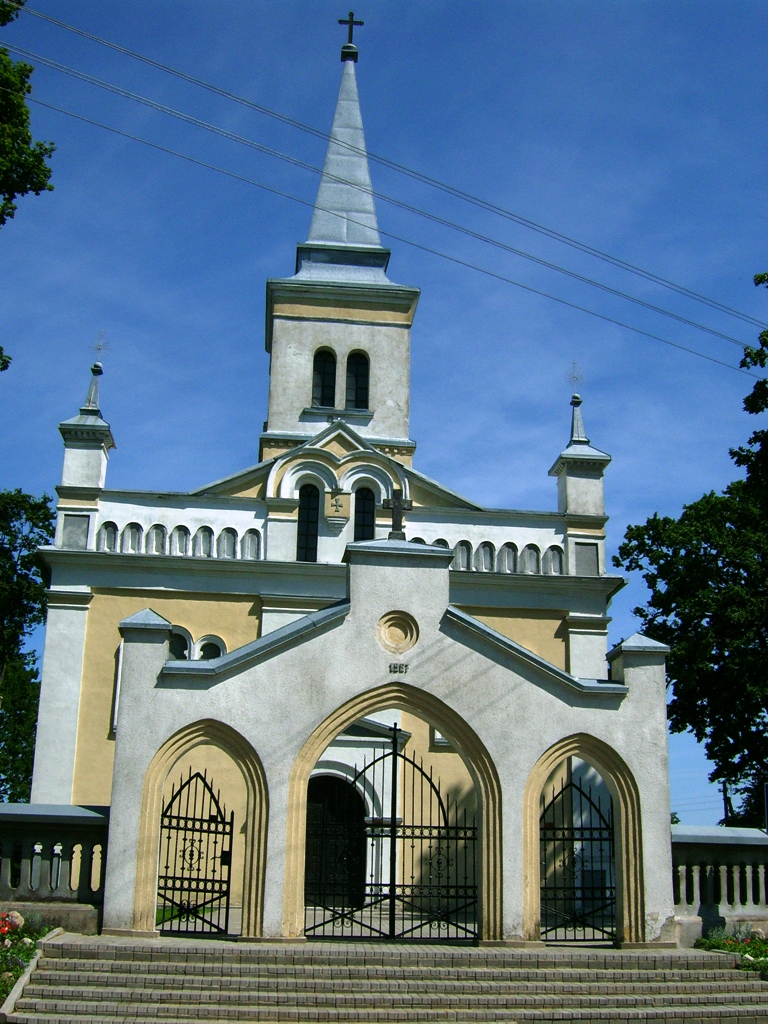

- Coat of arms

- Location within Lithuania
- Coordinates: 55°18′50″N 22°01′50″E
- Country: Lithuania
- Ethnographic region: Samogitia
- County: Tauragė County
- Municipality: Tauragė District Municipality
- Eldership: Žygaičių eldership
- Capital of: Žygaičių eldership

Population (2011)
  - Total: 542
- Time zone: UTC+2 (EET)
  - Summer (DST): UTC+3 (EEST)

Žygaičiai is a small town in Tauragė County, in western Lithuania. According to the 2011 census, the town has a population of 542 people.
