= Batakiai Eldership =

The Batakiai Eldership (Lithuanian: Batakių seniūnija) is an eldership of Lithuania, located in the Tauragė District Municipality. In 2021 its population was 1153.
