= Batakiai =

- Town
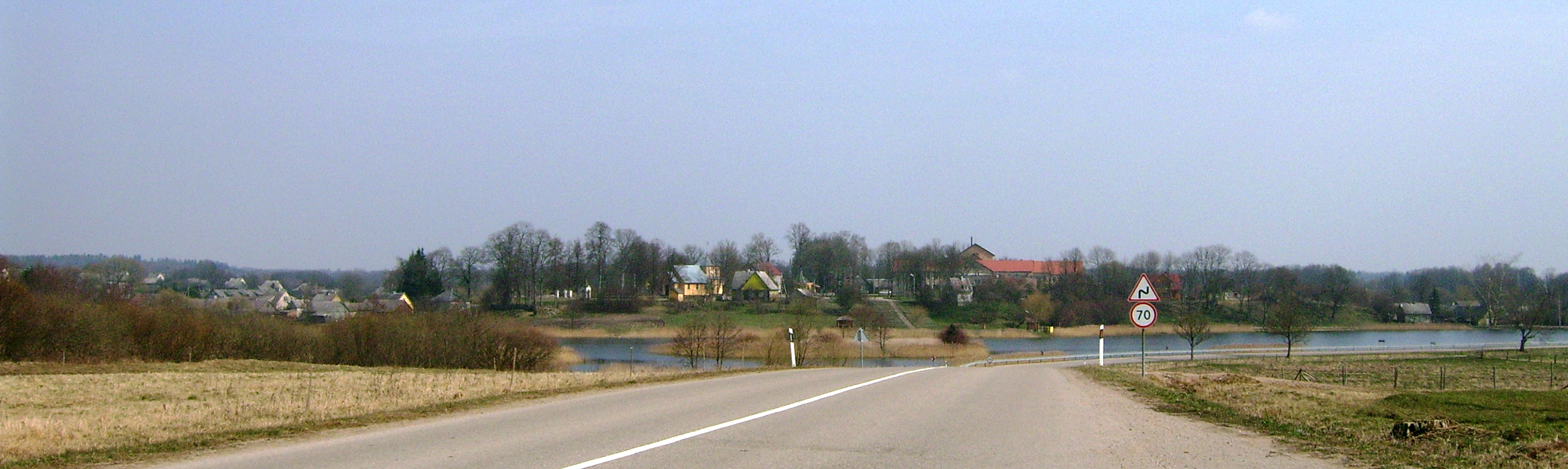

- Coat of arms

- Location within Lithuania
- Coordinates: 55°21′10″N 22°30′40″E
- Country: Lithuania
- County: Taurage County

Population (2011)
  - Total: 246
- Time zone: UTC+2 (EET)
  - Summer (DST): UTC+3 (EEST)

Batakiai (Samogitian: Batakē, Polish: Botoki) is a town in Taurage County, Lithuania. According to the 2011 census, the town has a population of 246 people.

== Gallery ==
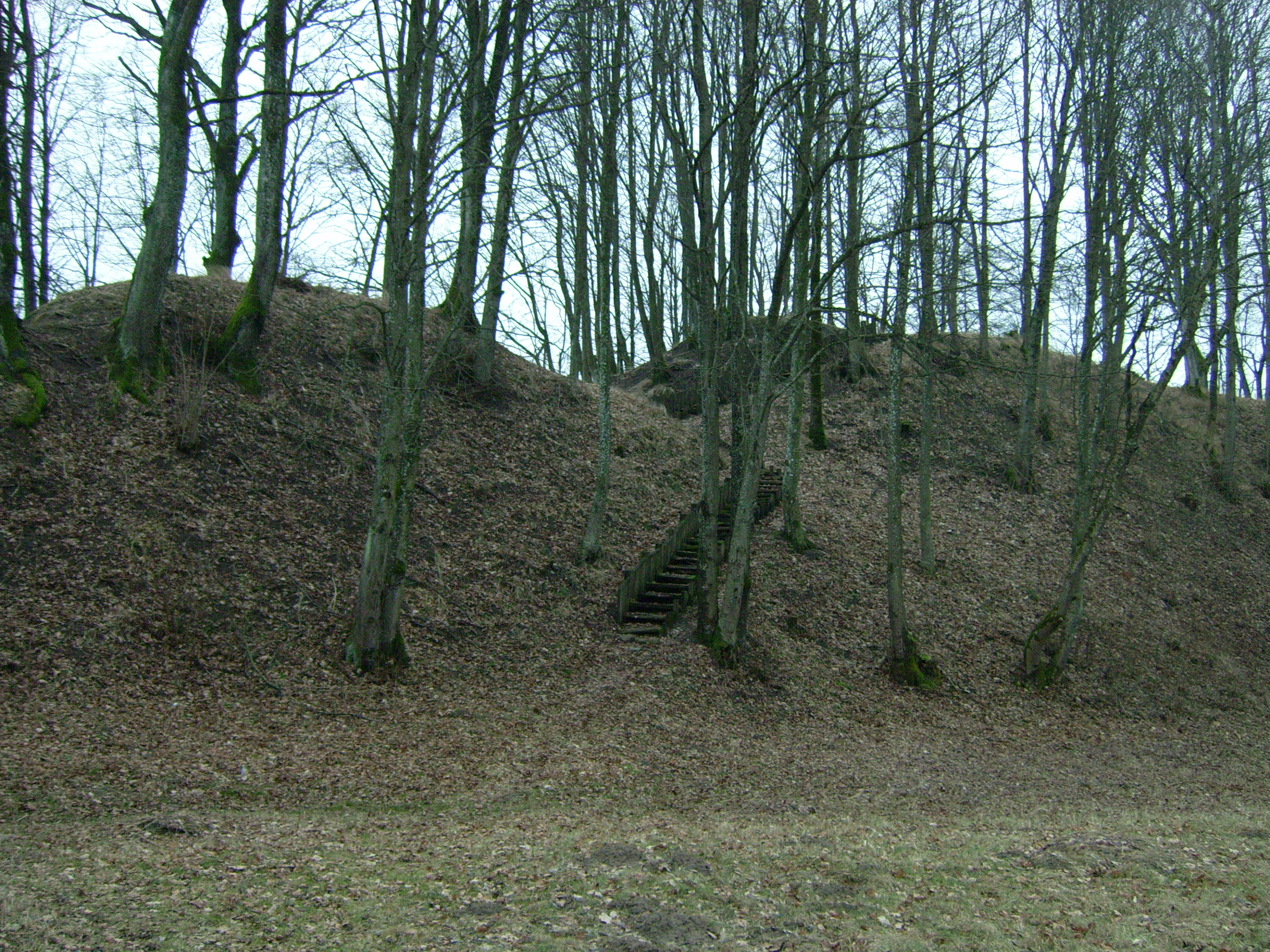
Batakiai mound

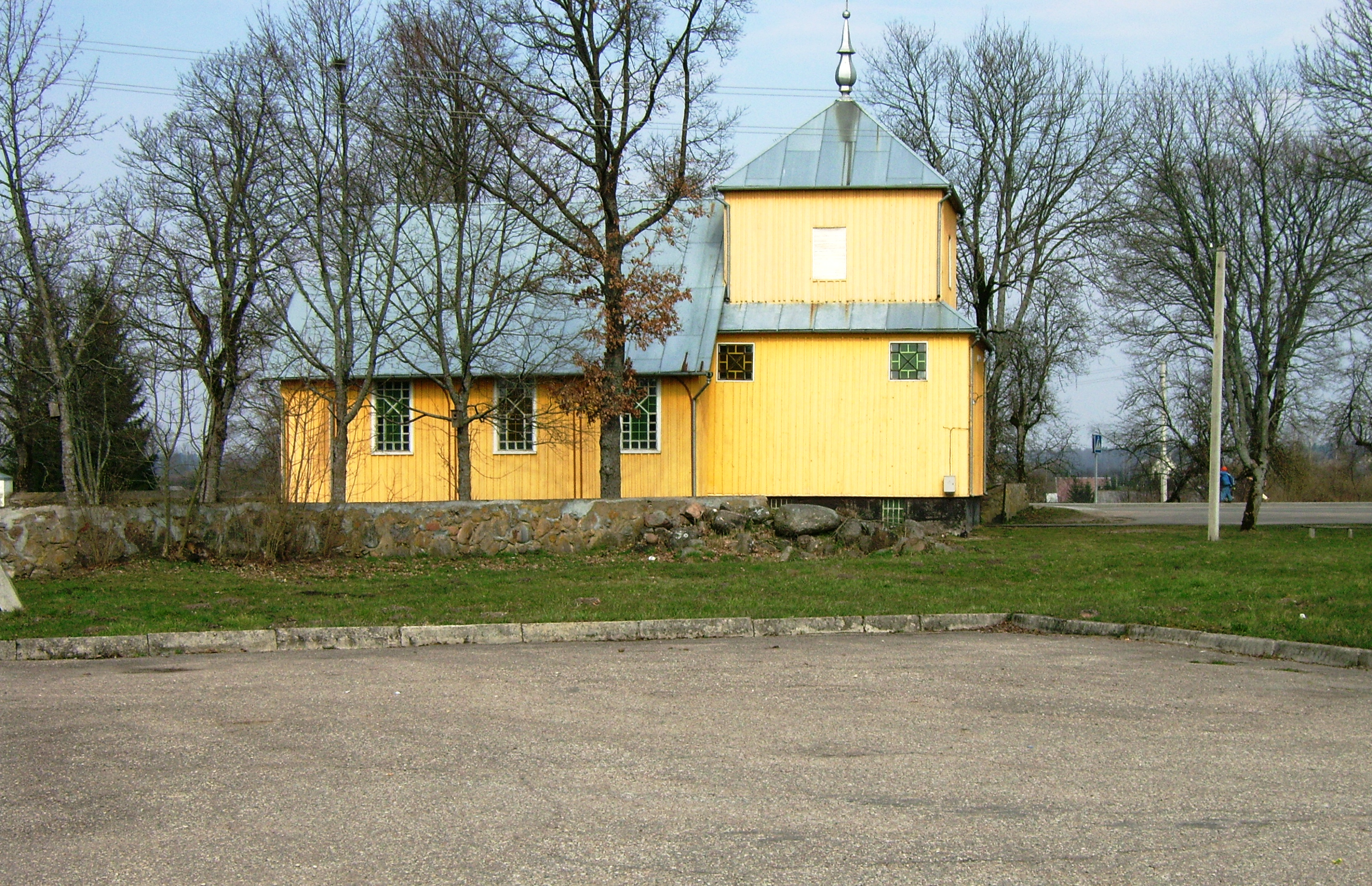
St. Anne's Church

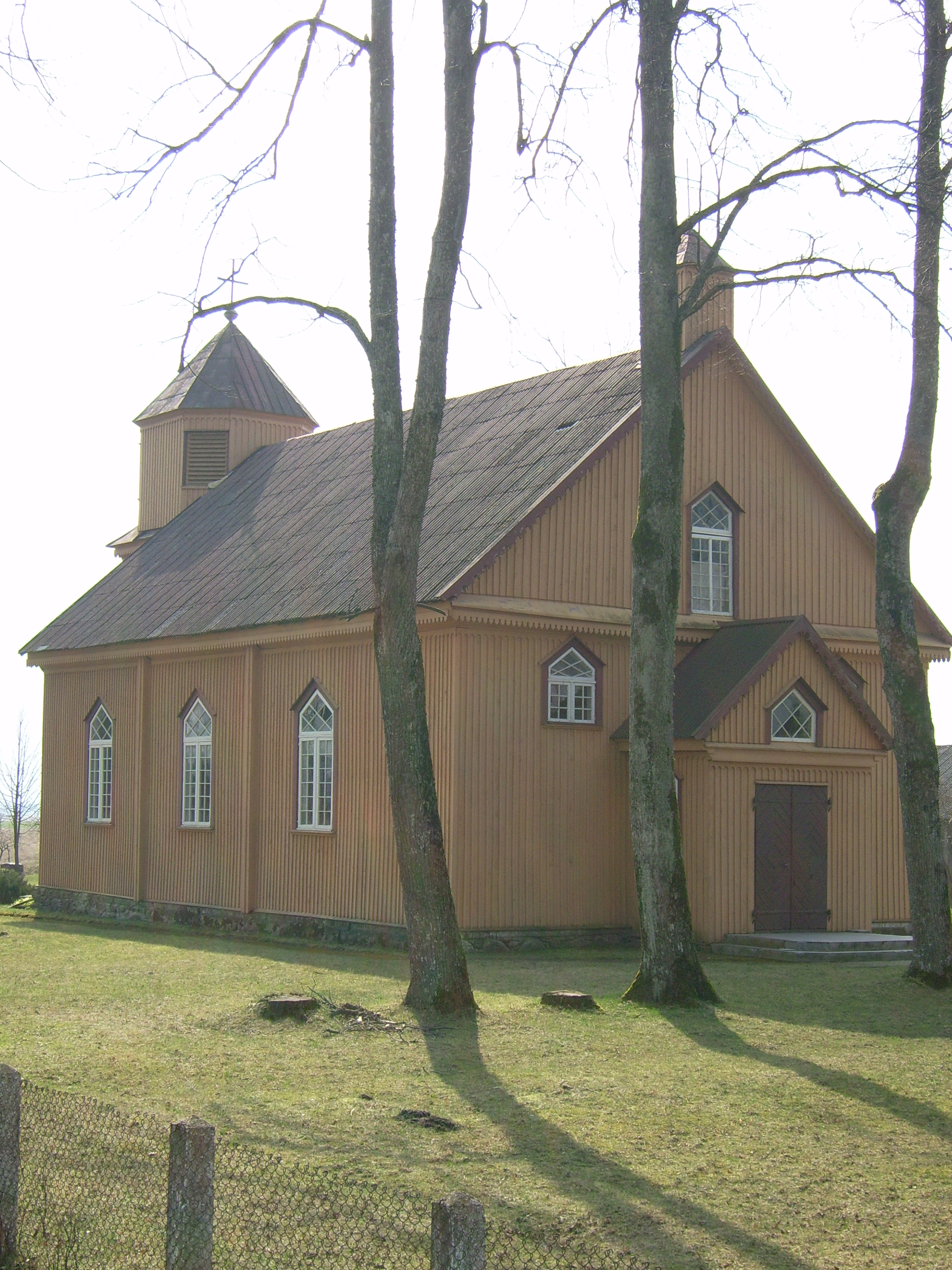
Batakiai Evangelical Lutheran Church

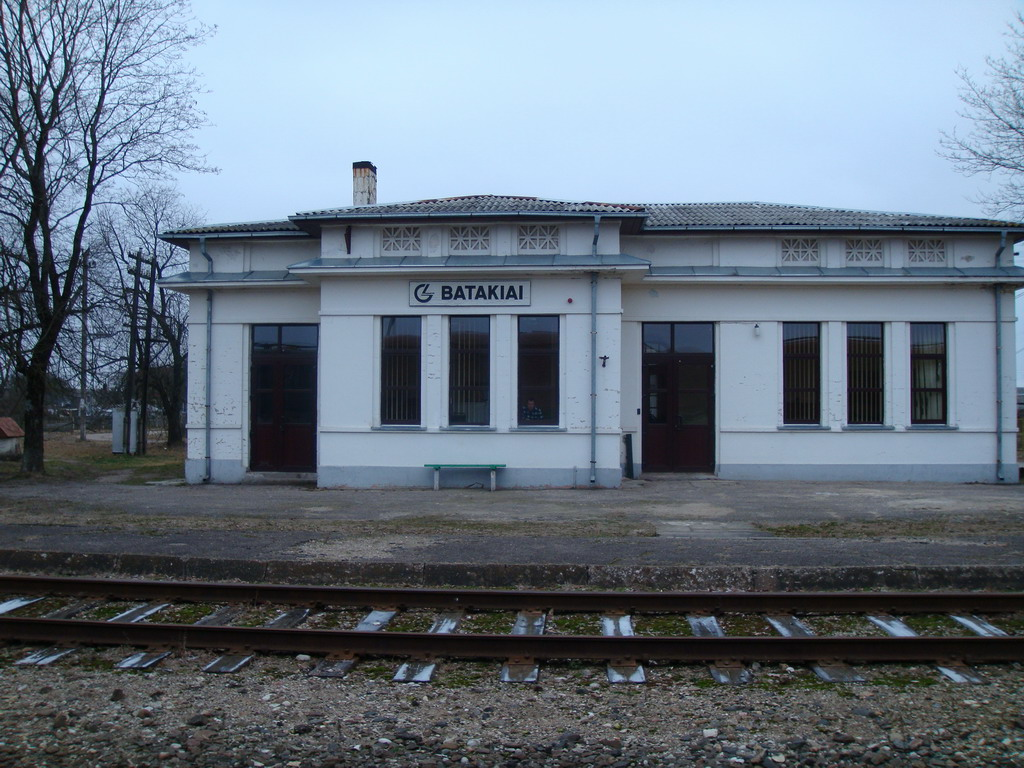
Batakiai Railway Station
