= Mažonai Eldership =

Eldership of Lithuania

The Mažonai Eldership (Lithuanian: Mažonų seniūnija) is an eldership of Lithuania, located in the Tauragė District Municipality. In 2021 its population was 2732.
