= Gaurė Eldership =

Eldership of Lithuania

The Gaurė Eldership (Lithuanian: Gaurės seniūnija) is an eldership of Lithuania, located in the Tauragė District Municipality. In 2021 its population was 1959.
