= Tauragė Eldership =

Eldership of Lithuania

The Tauragė Eldership (Lithuanian: Tauragės seniūnija) is an eldership of Lithuania, located in the Tauragė District Municipality. In 2021 its population was 4689.
