= Guare =

Guare is a surname. Notable people with the surname include:

- John Guare (born 1938), American playwright and screenwriter
- Juana Guare (17th century), Cacica from Daul, Ecuador, who fought against indigenous exploitation

== See also ==
- Guar, a South Asian legume
- Gaure (disambiguation)
