= Skaudvilė Eldership =

Eldership of Lithuania

The Skaudvilė Eldership (Lithuanian: Skaudvilės seniūnija) is an eldership of Lithuania, located in the Tauragė District Municipality. In 2021 its population was 3180.
