= Lauksargiai Eldership =

Eldership of Lithuania

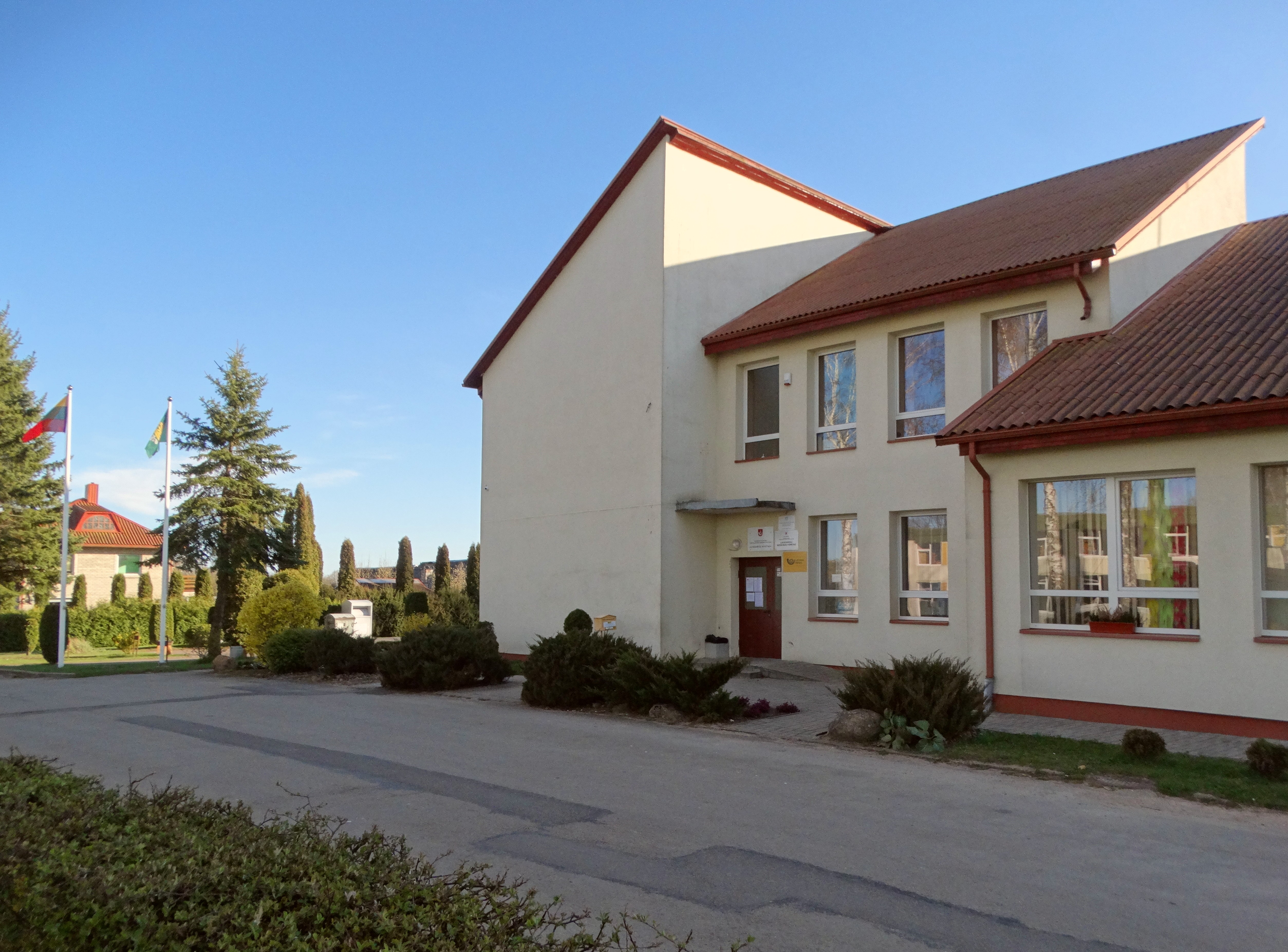

The Lauksargiai Eldership (Lithuanian: Lauksargių seniūnija) is an eldership of Lithuania, located in the Tauragė District Municipality. In 2021 its population was 1054.
