= Žygaičiai Eldership =

Eldership of Lithuania

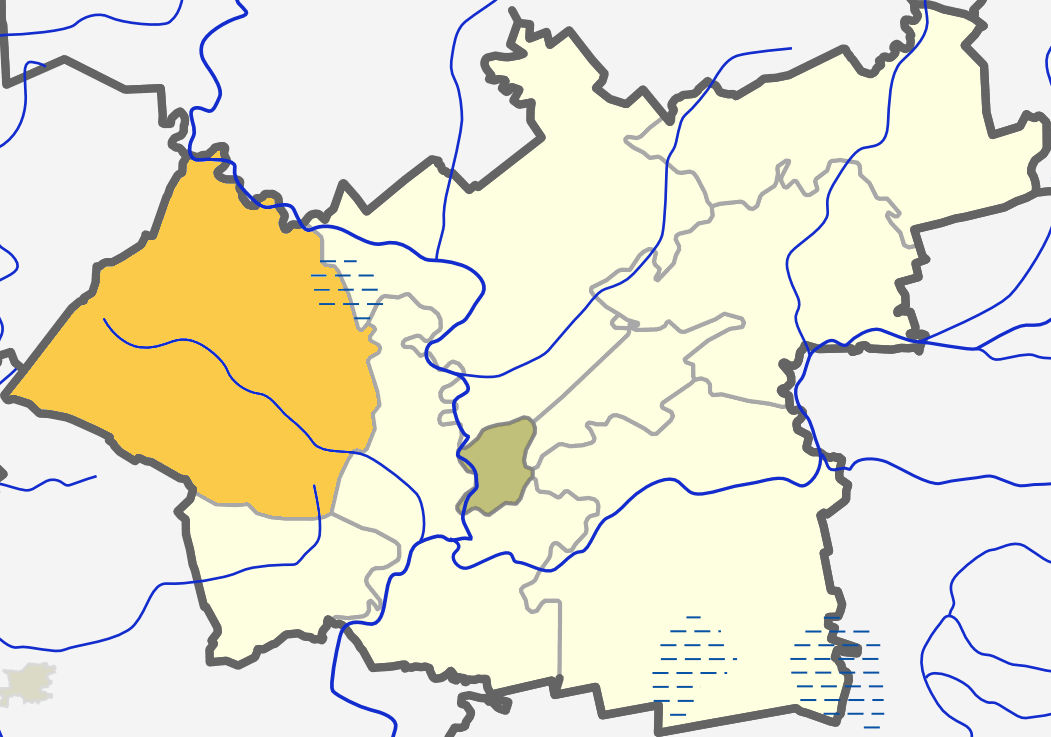
Location of Žigaičiai eldership on the map of Tauragė district

The Žygaičiai Eldership (Lithuanian: Žygaičių seniūnija) is an eldership of Lithuania, located in the Tauragė District Municipality. In 2021 its population was 2032.
