= Skaudvilė =

- Town
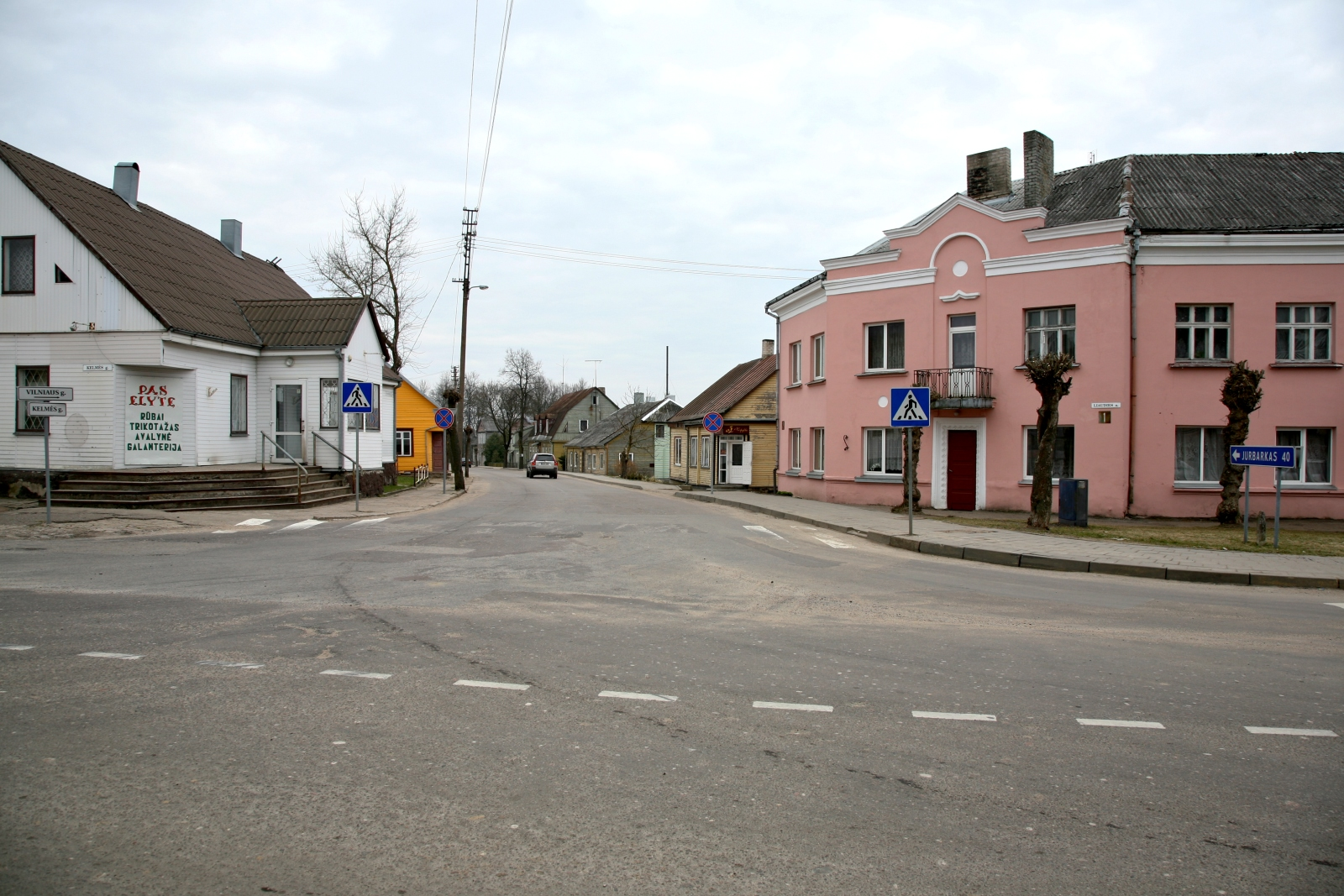

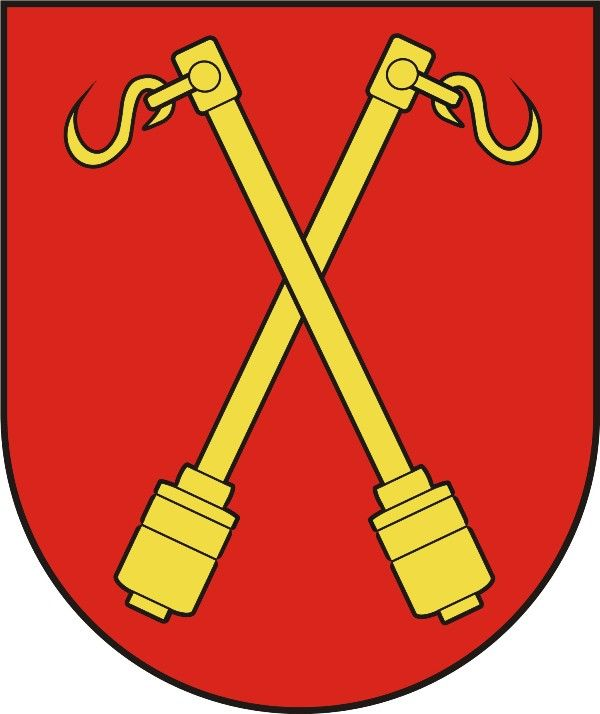
- Coat of arms

- Location of Skaudvilė
- Coordinates: 55°24′27″N 22°34′57″E
- Country: Lithuania
- Ethnographic region: Samogitia
- County: Tauragė County
- Municipality: Tauragė district municipality
- Eldership: Skaudvilė eldership
- Capital of: Skaudvilė eldership
- First mentioned: 1760
- Granted city rights: 1950

Population (2022)
  - Total: 1,410
- Time zone: UTC+2 (EET)
  - Summer (DST): UTC+3 (EEST)

Skaudvilė (Samogitian: Skaudvėlė) is a town in the Tauragė district municipality of Lithuania. It is located 26 km (16 mi) north-east of Tauragė.

== History ==
During World War II, the town was under Soviet occupation from 1940, and then under German occupation from 1941 to 1944. In August 1941, the Jewish community of the town was massacred in a mass execution perpetrated by an Einsatzgruppe. 300 Jews were killed.

== Gallery ==
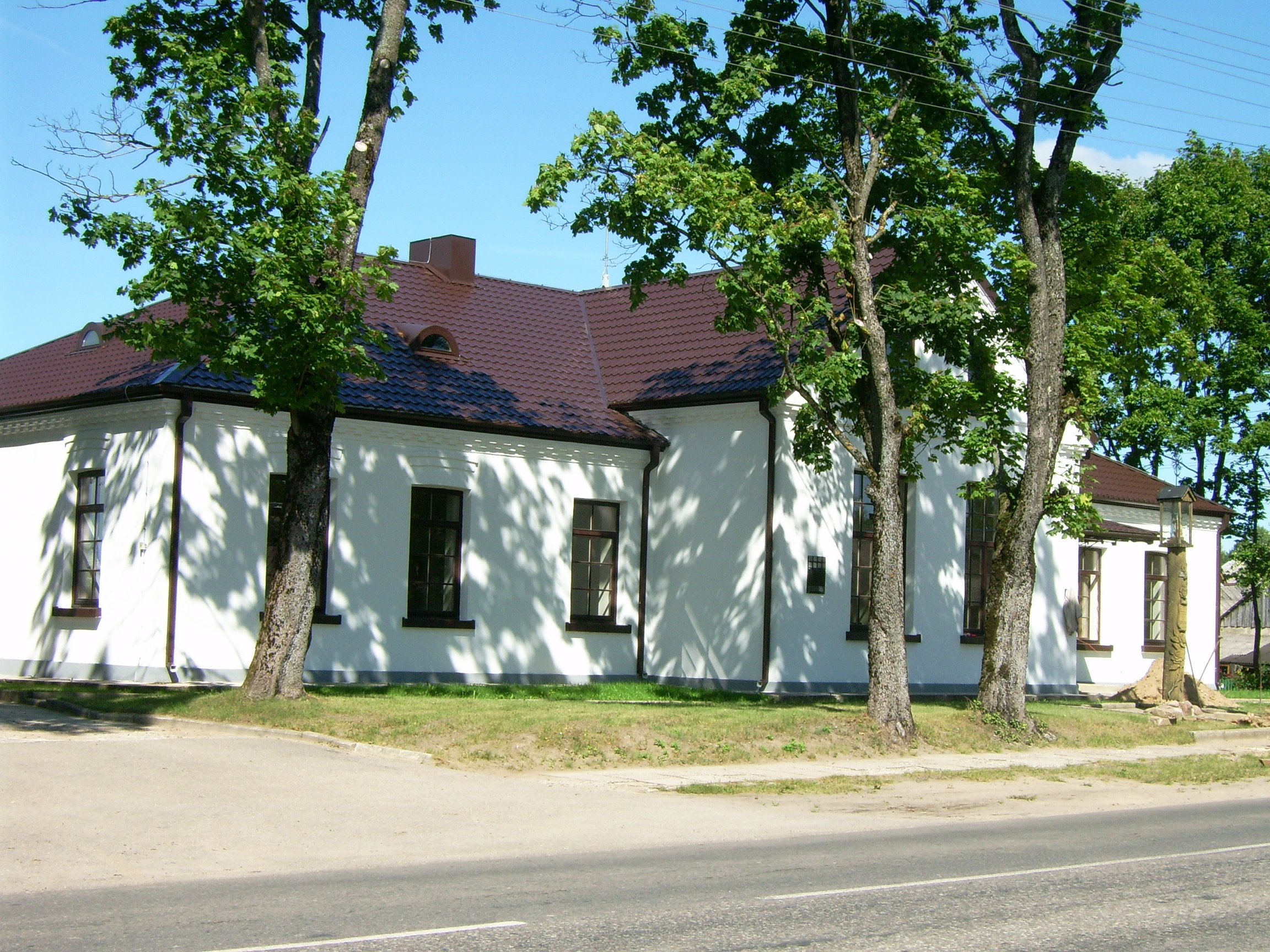
Skaudvilė police station

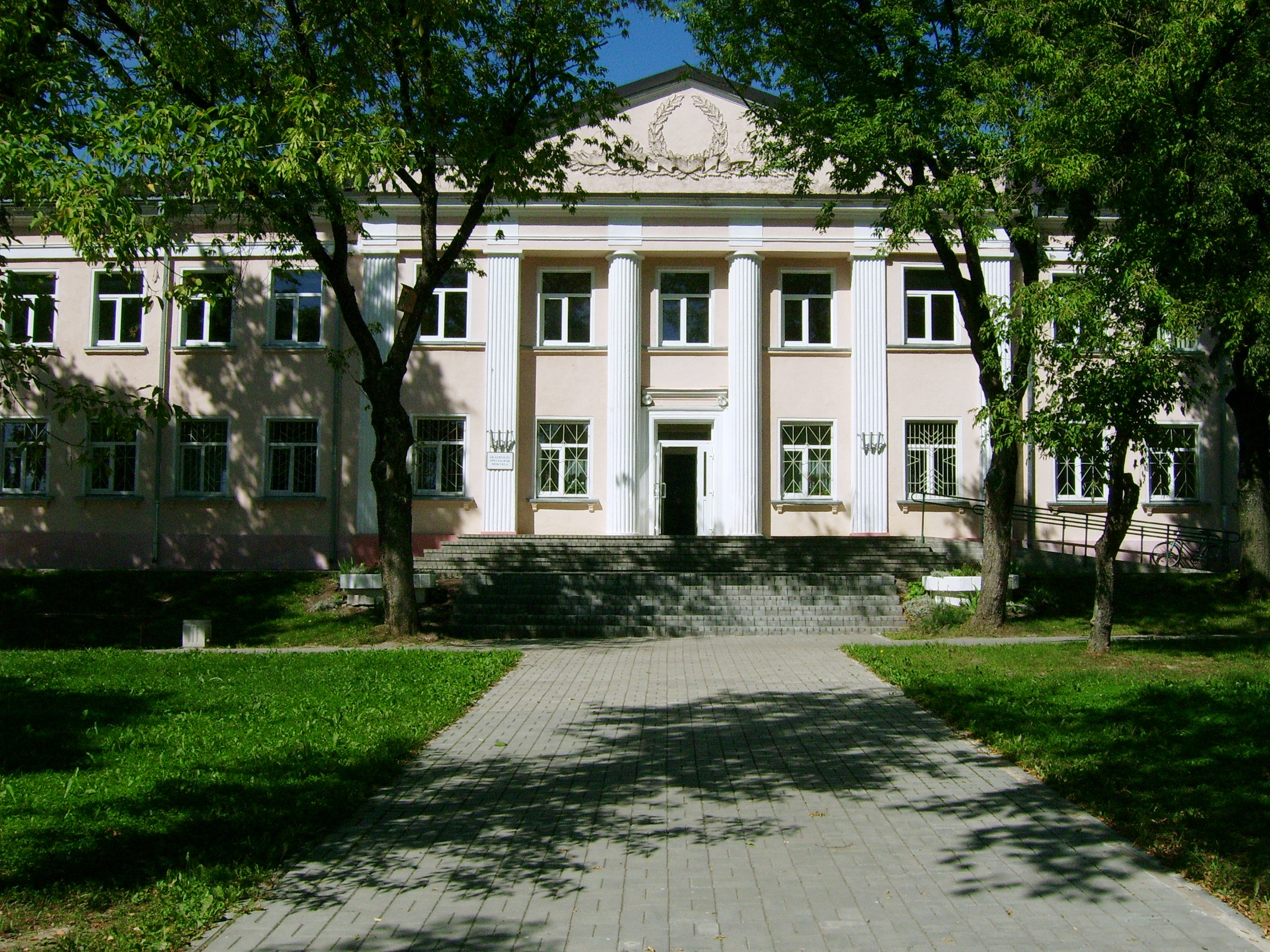
Skaudvilė special school

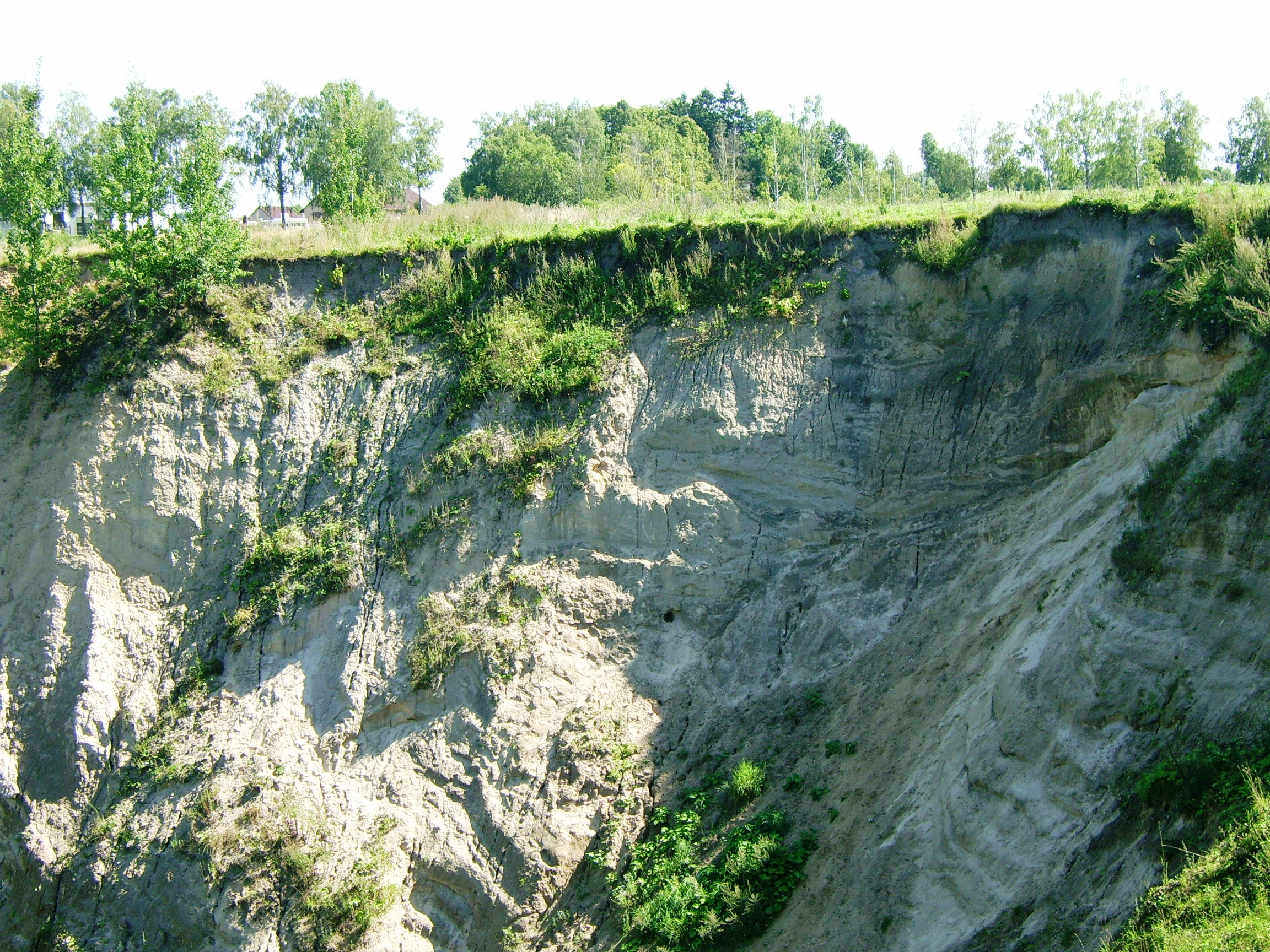
Exposures in Skaudvilė

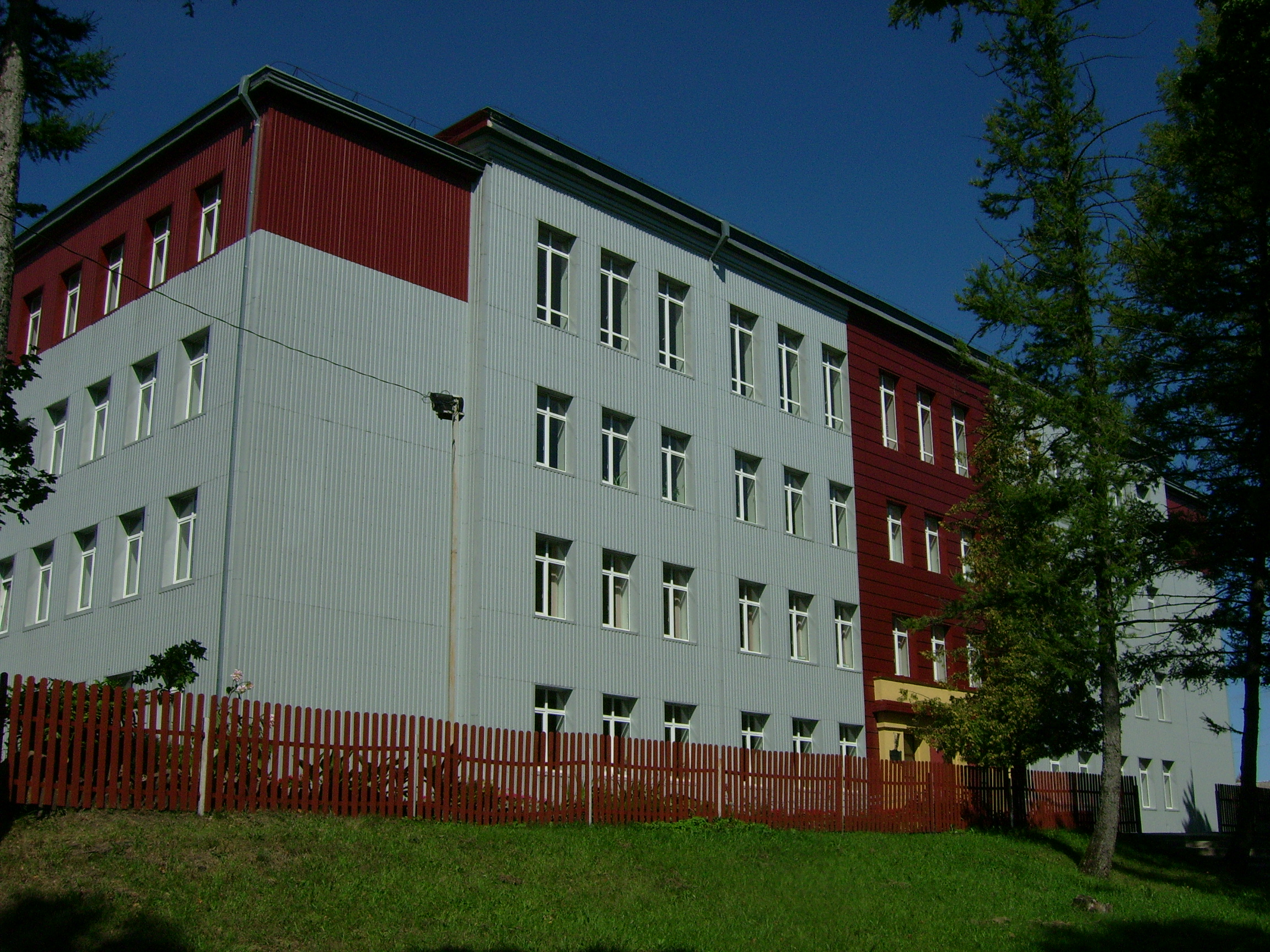
Skaudvilė gymnasium
