= Juana Guare =

Cacique from Daul

Juana Guare or Juana de Guare was a Cacica from Daul who fought against indigenous exploitation.

== Biography ==
She inherited the cacicazgo in the 17th century and by 1690 she owned the vast site known as Junquillal, in Ecuador.

As cacica, she defended the rights of her racial brothers. Her strong protests were raised against the abuses committed by members of the Spanish clergy who exploited, for their benefit and personal enrichment, the indigenous people.

== Legacy ==
In the province of Los Ríos, a parish was called "Guare" in honor of Juana due to her influence from indigenous chieftaincy.
