= Gaurė =

- Town
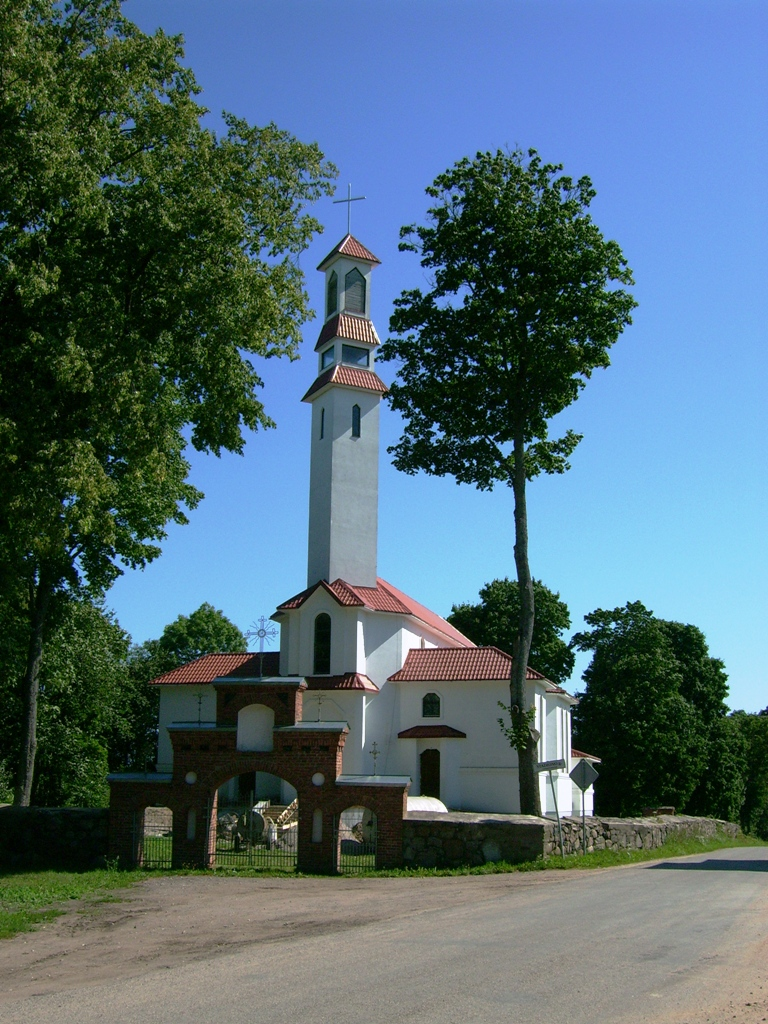

- Seal

- Location within Lithuania
- Coordinates: 55°14′30″N 22°28′30″E
- Country: Lithuania
- County: Taurage County

Population (2011)
  - Total: 418
- Time zone: UTC+2 (EET)
  - Summer (DST): UTC+3 (EEST)

Gaurė is a town in Taurage County, Lithuania. According to the 2011 census, the town has a population of 418 people. Gaurė was mentioned for the first time in 1500.
