= Tauragė County =

County of Lithuania

Tauragė County Tauragės apskritis
- County
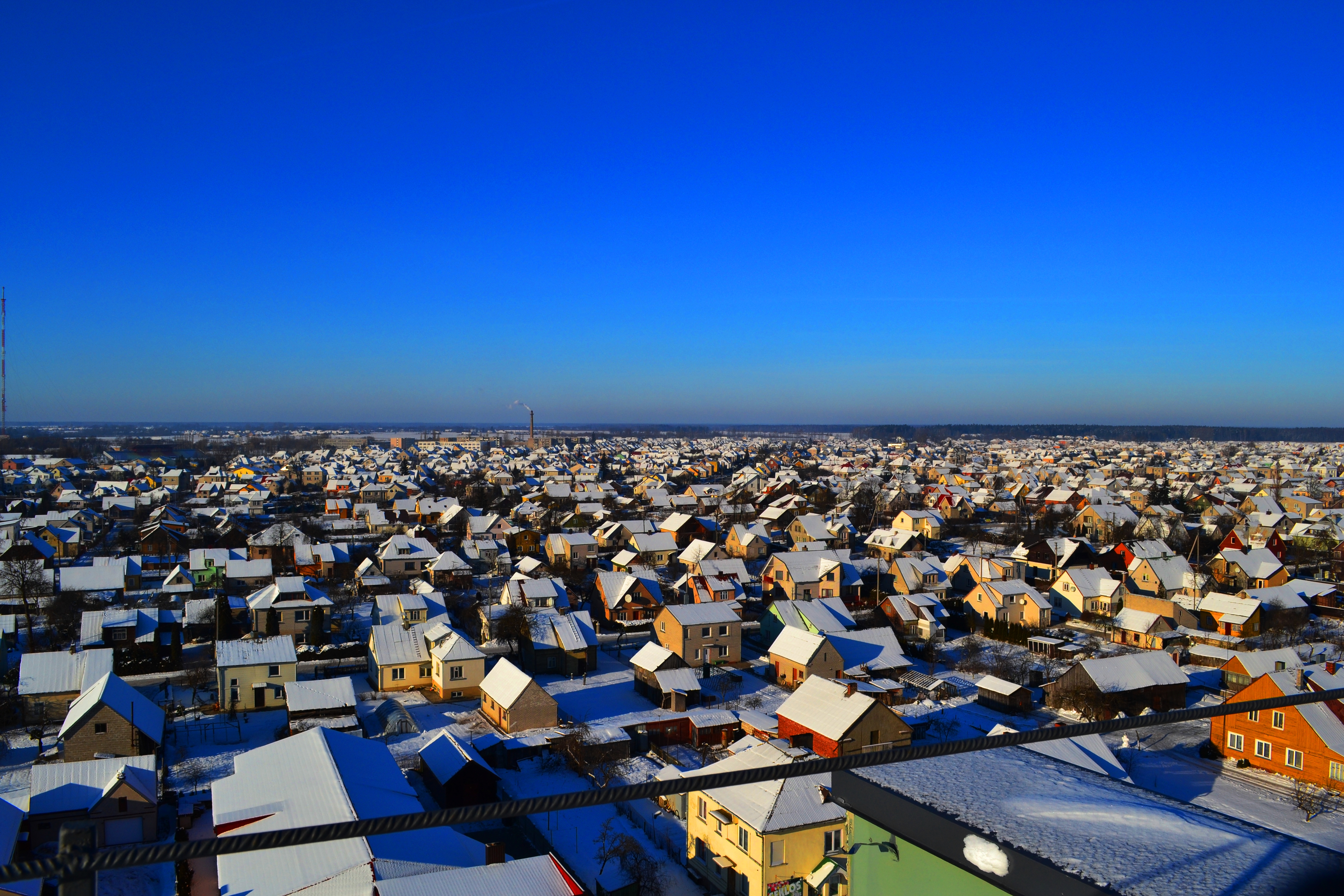
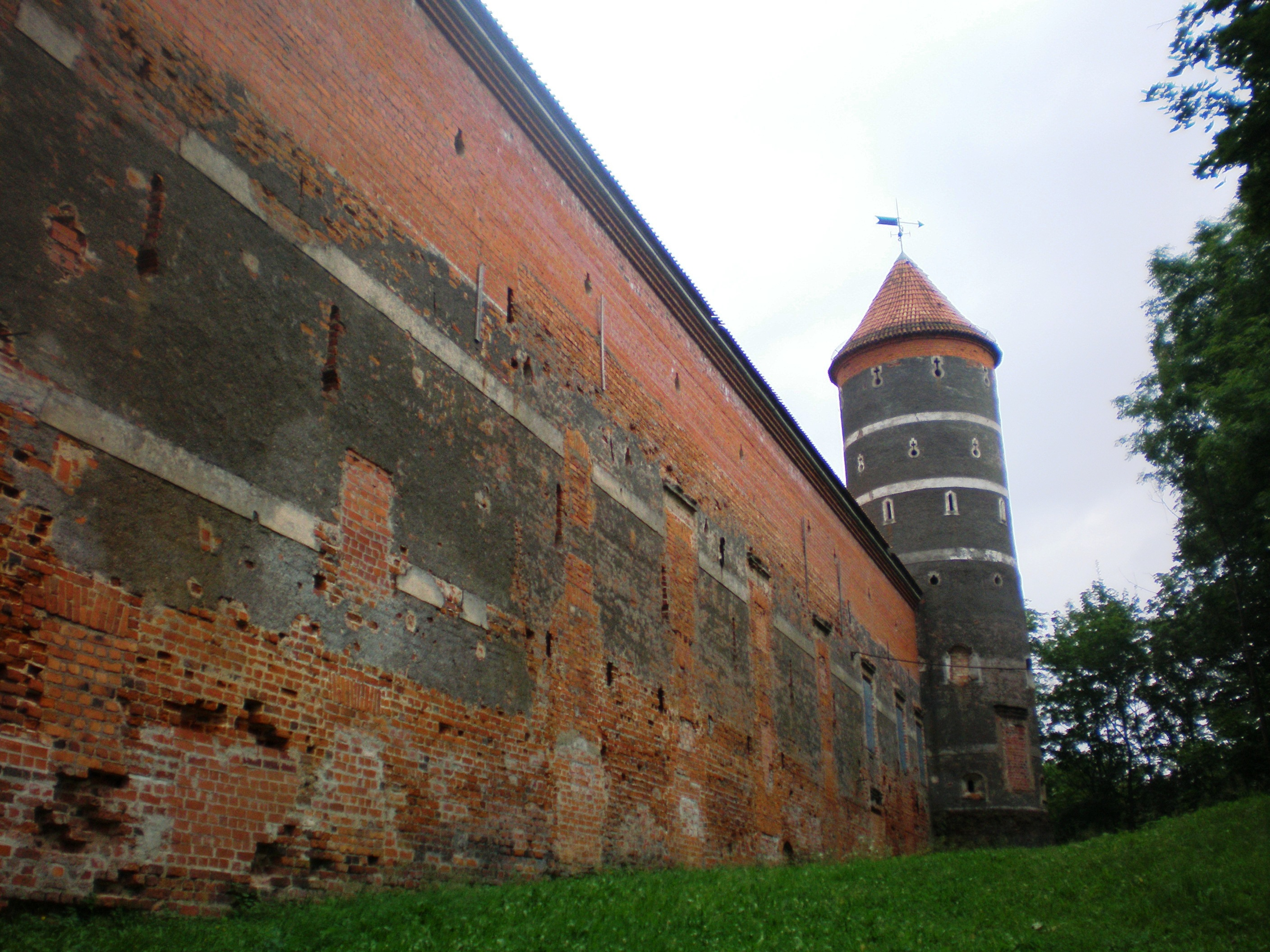
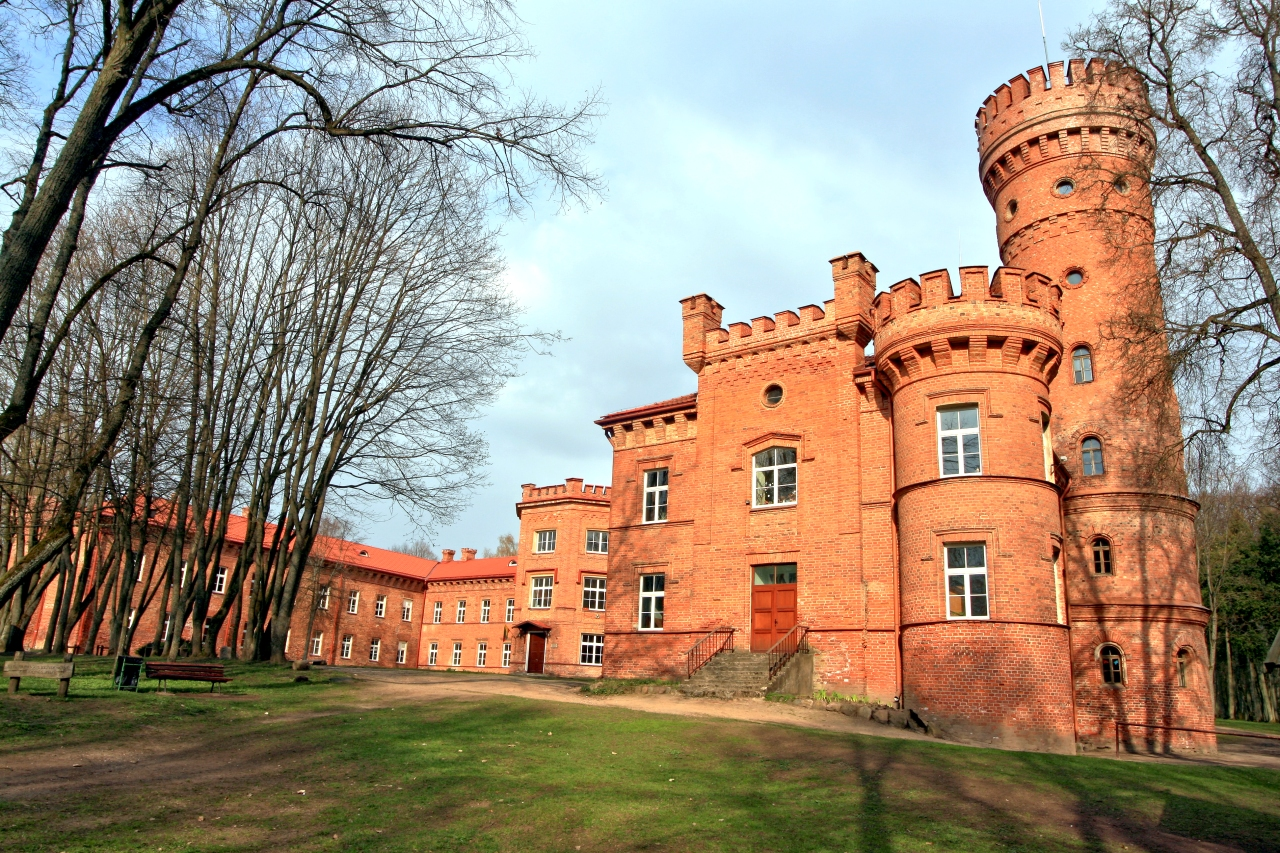
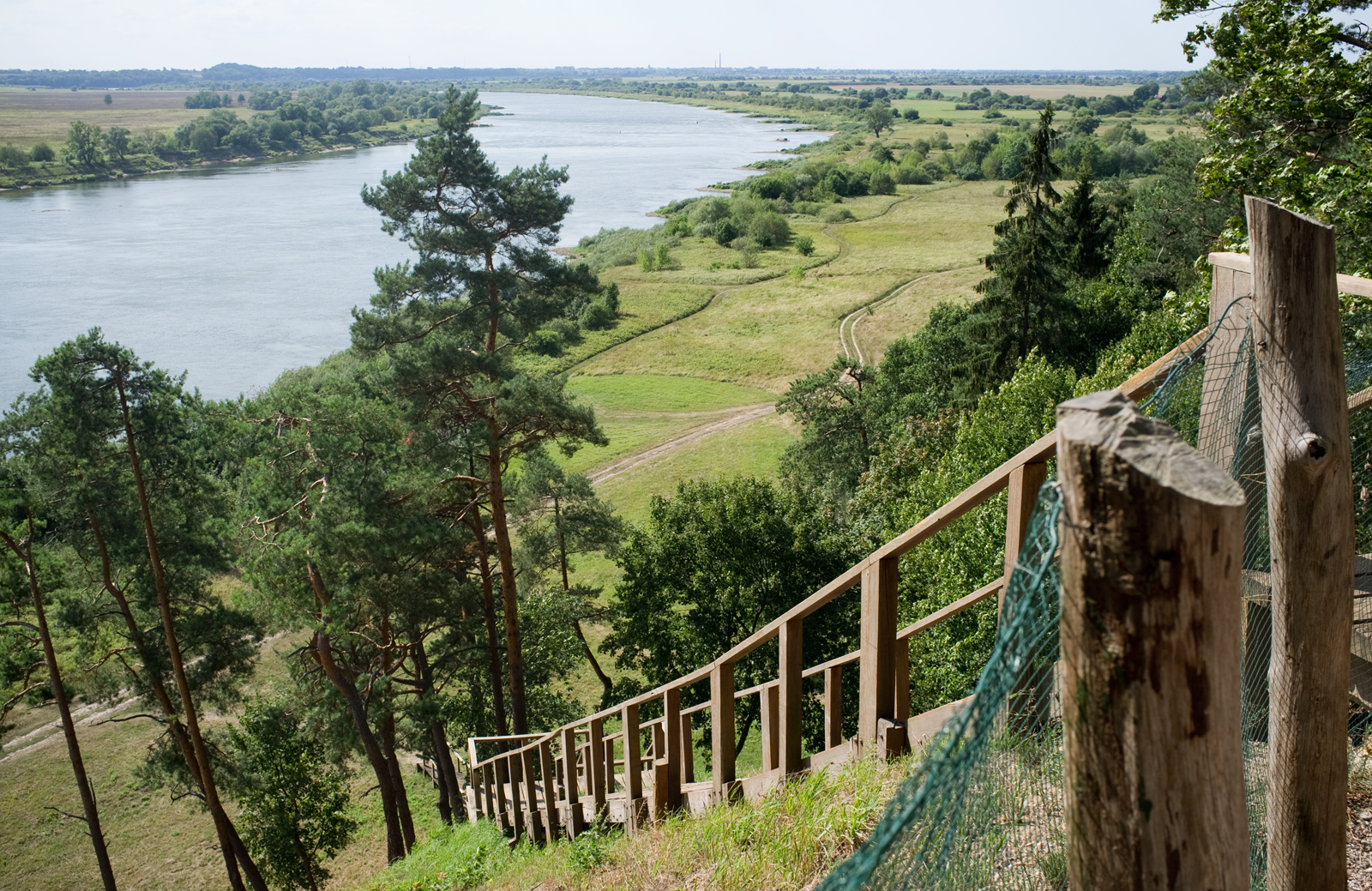
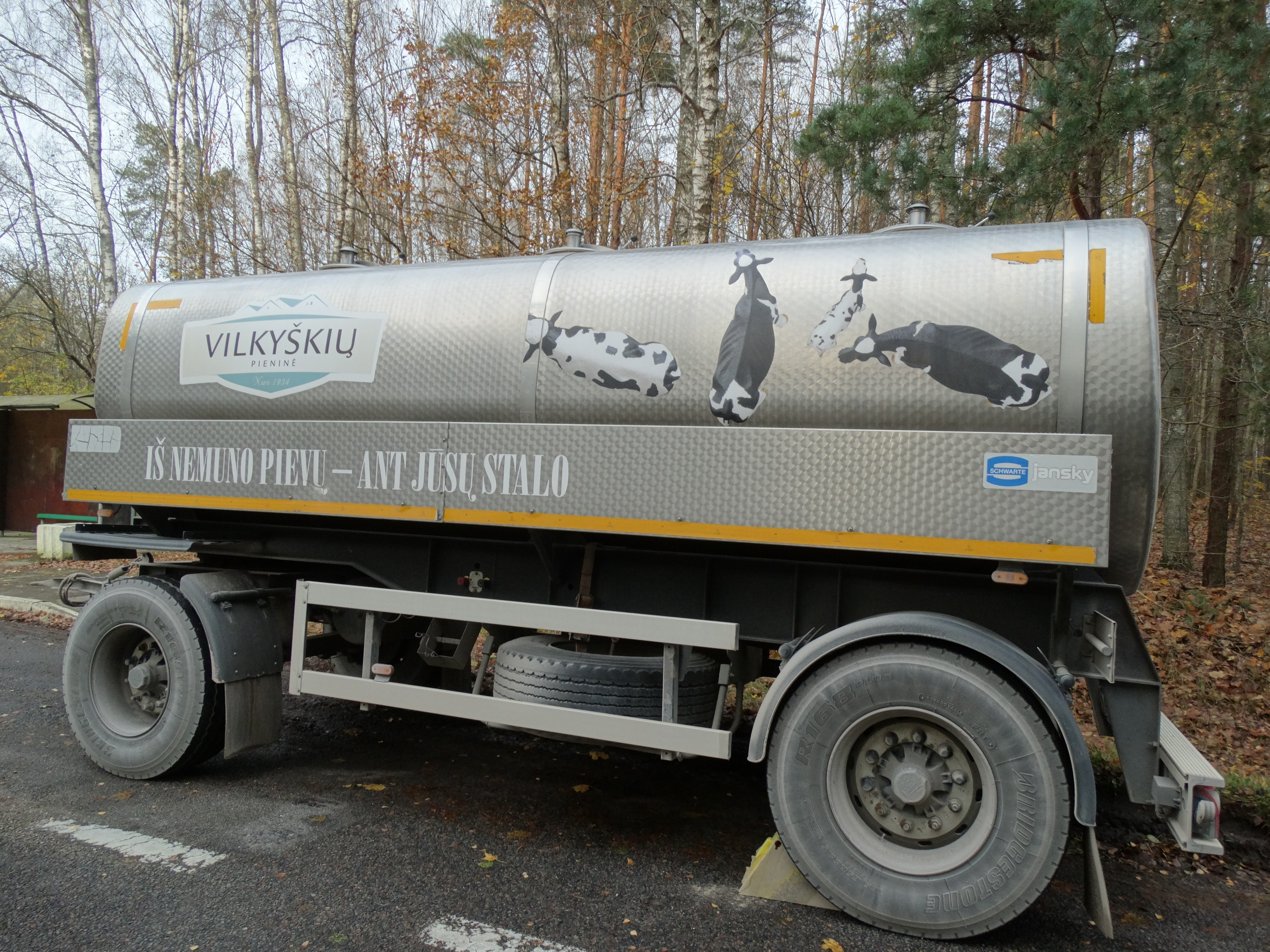
- From the top to bottom-right: Tauragė during winter, Panemunė castle, Raudonė Castle, Rambynas hill, Vilkyškių pieninė company milk tank

- Flag Coat of arms

- Location of Tauragė County
- Coordinates: 55°15′22″N 22°17′34″E
- Country: Lithuania
- Administrative centre: Tauragė
- Municipalities: List: Jurbarkas District Municipality; Pagėgiai Municipality; Šilalė District Municipality; Tauragė District Municipality

Area
  - Total: 4,409 km^{2} (1,702 sq mi)
- (6.7% of the area of Lithuania)

Population (2020-01-01)
  - Total: 91,822
  - Rank: 10th of 10 (3.7% of the population of Lithuania)
  - Density: 20.83/km^{2} (53.94/sq mi)

GDP
  - Total: €1.3 billion (2023) · 10th
- Time zone: UTC+2 (EET)
  - Summer (DST): UTC+3 (EEST)
- ISO 3166 code: LT-TA
- HDI (2022): 0.825 very high · 10th

Tauragė County (Lithuanian: Tauragės apskritis) is one of ten counties in Lithuania. It is in the west of the country, and its capital is Tauragė. On 1 July 2010, the county administration was abolished, and since that date, Tauragė County remains as a territorial and statistical unit.

Famous landmarks include Tauragė Castle and Panemunė Castle.

== Municipalities ==
Jurbarkas District Municipality
Pagėgiai Municipality
Šilalė District Municipality
Tauragė District Municipality

== Cities ==
1. Tauragė
2. Jurbarkas
3. Šilalė
4. Pagėgiai
5. Skaudvilė
6. Smalininkai
7. Panemunė

== Population by municipality ==
2011 Census
Locality	Total	Male	Female
Tauragės County	110,059	51,509	58,550
Jurbarkas District Municipality	30,186	14,113	16,073
Eržvilko Eldership (seniūnija)	2,433	1,171	1,262
Girdžių Eldership (seniūnija)	1,146	561	585
Juodaičių Eldership (seniūnija)	460	215	245
Jurbarko miesto Eldership (seniūnija)	11,232	5,092	6,140
Jurbarkų Eldership (seniūnija)	3,055	1,489	1,566
Raudonės Eldership (seniūnija)	1,359	672	687
Seredžiaus Eldership (seniūnija)	2,464	1,124	1,340
Skirsnemunės Eldership (seniūnija)	2,044	968	1,076
Smalininkų Eldership (seniūnija)	1,286	587	699
Šimkaičių Eldership (seniūnija)	1,997	959	1,038
Veliuonos Eldership (seniūnija)	1,634	766	868
Viešvilės Eldership (seniūnija)	1,076	509	567
Pagėgiai Municipality	9,500	4,482	5,018
Lumpėnų Eldership (seniūnija)	1,040	508	532
Natkiškių Eldership (seniūnija)	824	402	422
Pagėgių Eldership (seniūnija)	4,067	1,888	2,179
Stoniškių Eldership (seniūnija)	2,019	963	1,056
Vilkyškių Eldership (seniūnija)	1,550	721	829
Šilalė District Municipality	26,520	12,752	13,768
Bijotų Eldership (seniūnija)	992	518	474
Bilionių Eldership (seniūnija)	447	238	209
Didkiemio Eldership (seniūnija)	307	142	165
Kaltinėnų Eldership (seniūnija)	2,524	1,218	1,306
Kvėdarnos Eldership (seniūnija)	3,407	1,626	1,781
Laukuvos Eldership (seniūnija)	3,106	1,495	1,611
Pajūrio Eldership (seniūnija)	2,174	1,085	1,089
Palentinio Eldership (seniūnija)	260	121	139
Šilalės kaimiškoji Eldership (seniūnija)	2,951	1,423	1,528
Šilalės miesto Eldership (seniūnija)	5,492	2,512	2,980
Tenenių Eldership (seniūnija)	530	271	259
Traksėdžio Eldership (seniūnija)	1,739	853	886
Upynos Eldership (seniūnija)	1,830	879	951
Žadeikių Eldership (seniūnija)	761	371	390
Tauragė District Municipality	43,853	20,162	23,691
Batakių Eldership (seniūnija)	1,392	640	752
Gaurės Eldership (seniūnija)	2,424	1,147	1,277
Lauksargių Eldership (seniūnija)	1,271	618	653
Mažonų Eldership (seniūnija)	3,120	1,498	1,622
Skaudvilės Eldership (seniūnija)	3,811	1,744	2,067
Tauragės miesto Eldership (seniūnija)	24,389	10,907	13,482
Tauragės Eldership (seniūnija)	4,835	2,355	2,480
Žygaičių Eldership (seniūnija)	2,611	1,253	1,358

== Gallery ==
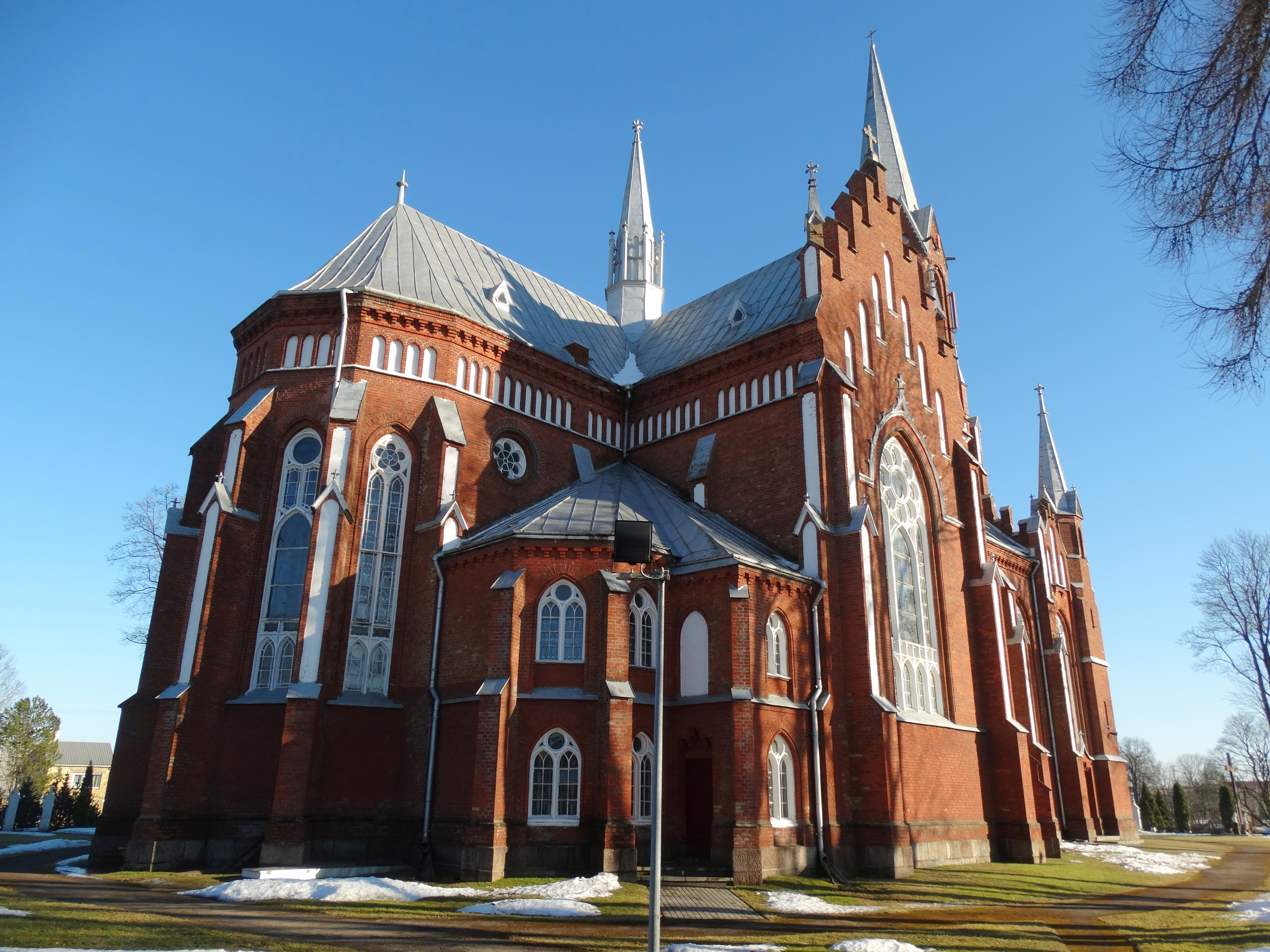
St. Francis church in Šilalė

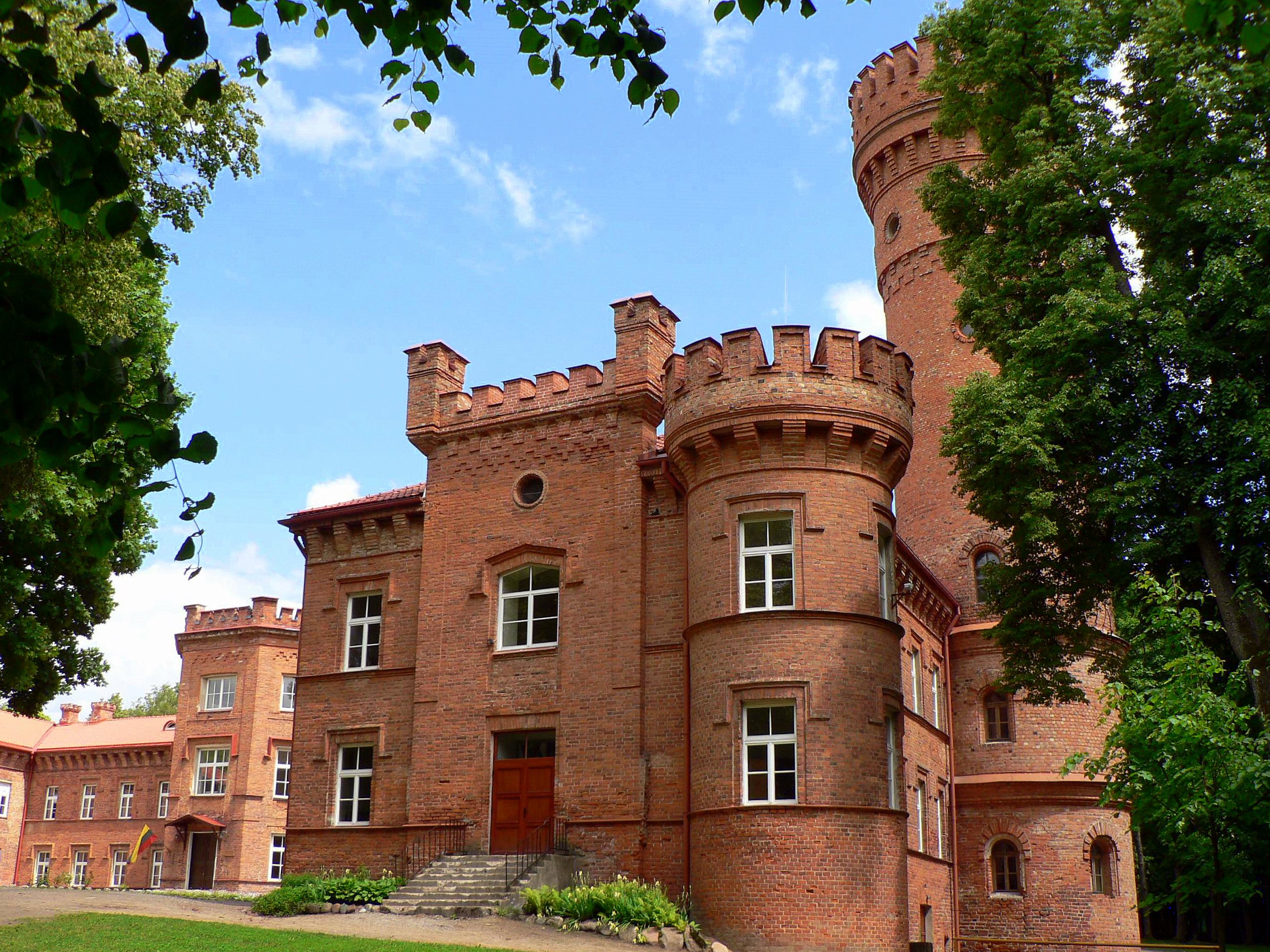
Raudonė Castle

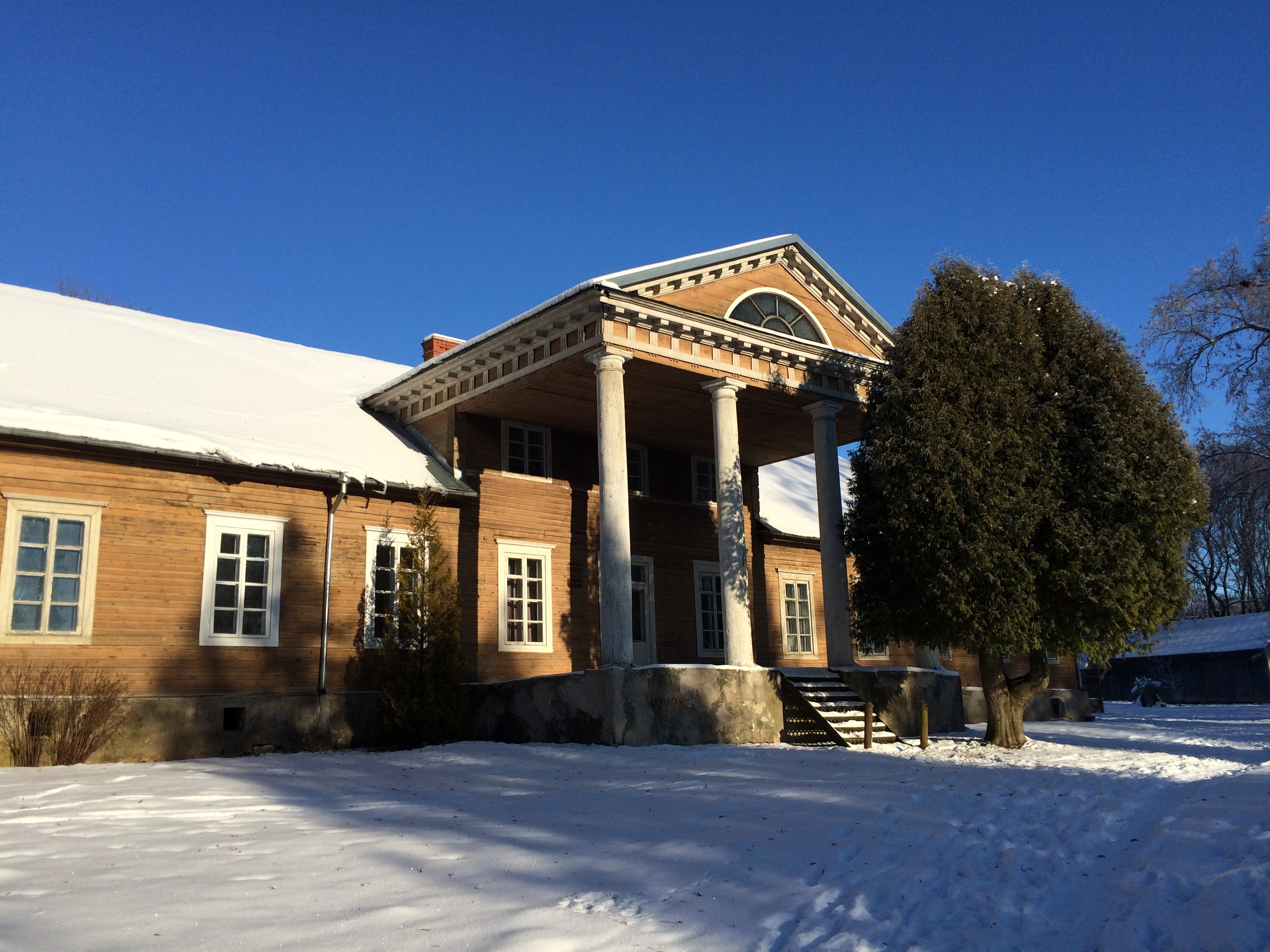
Veliuona Manor

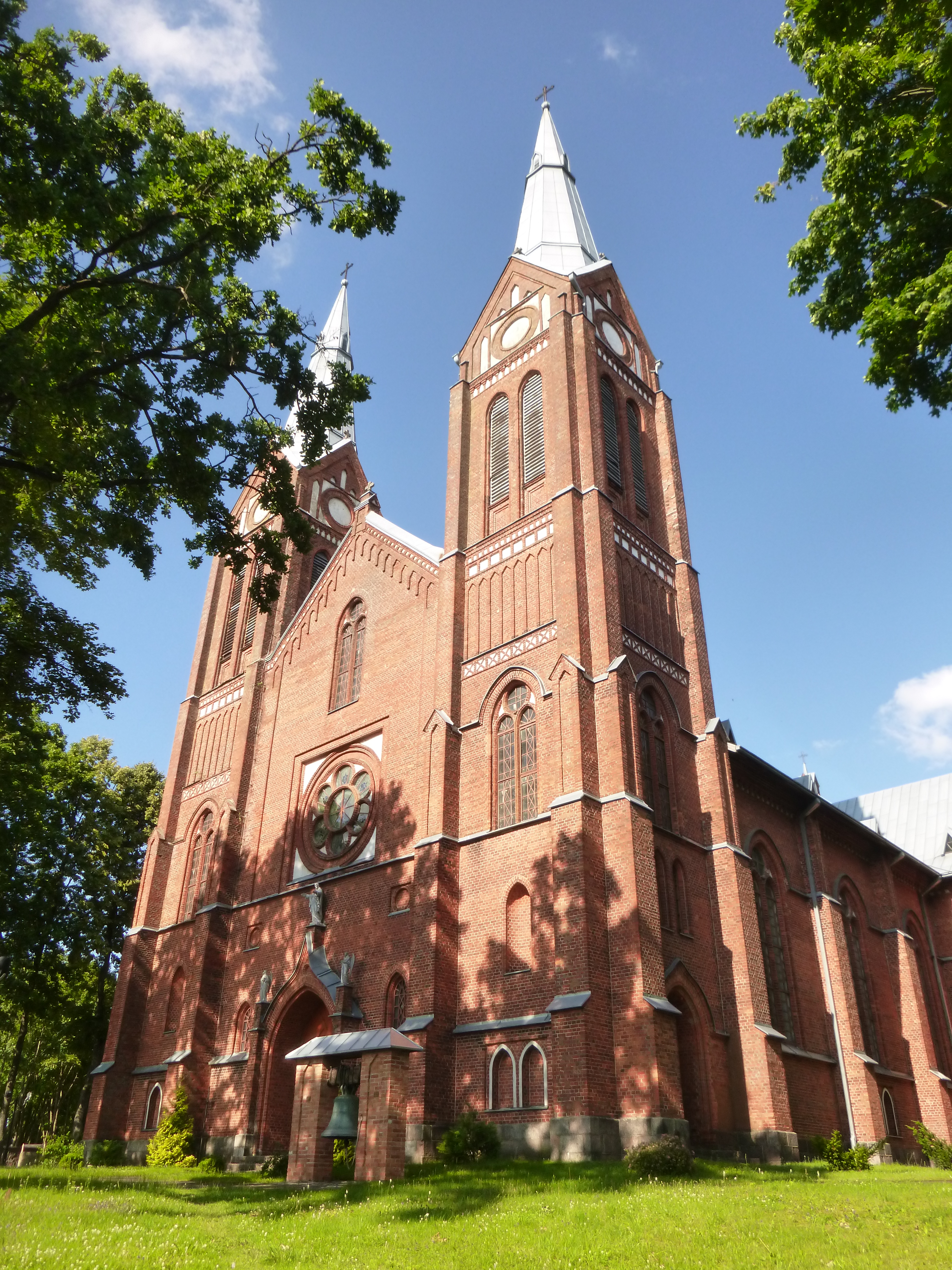
Holy Trinity church in Jurbarkas

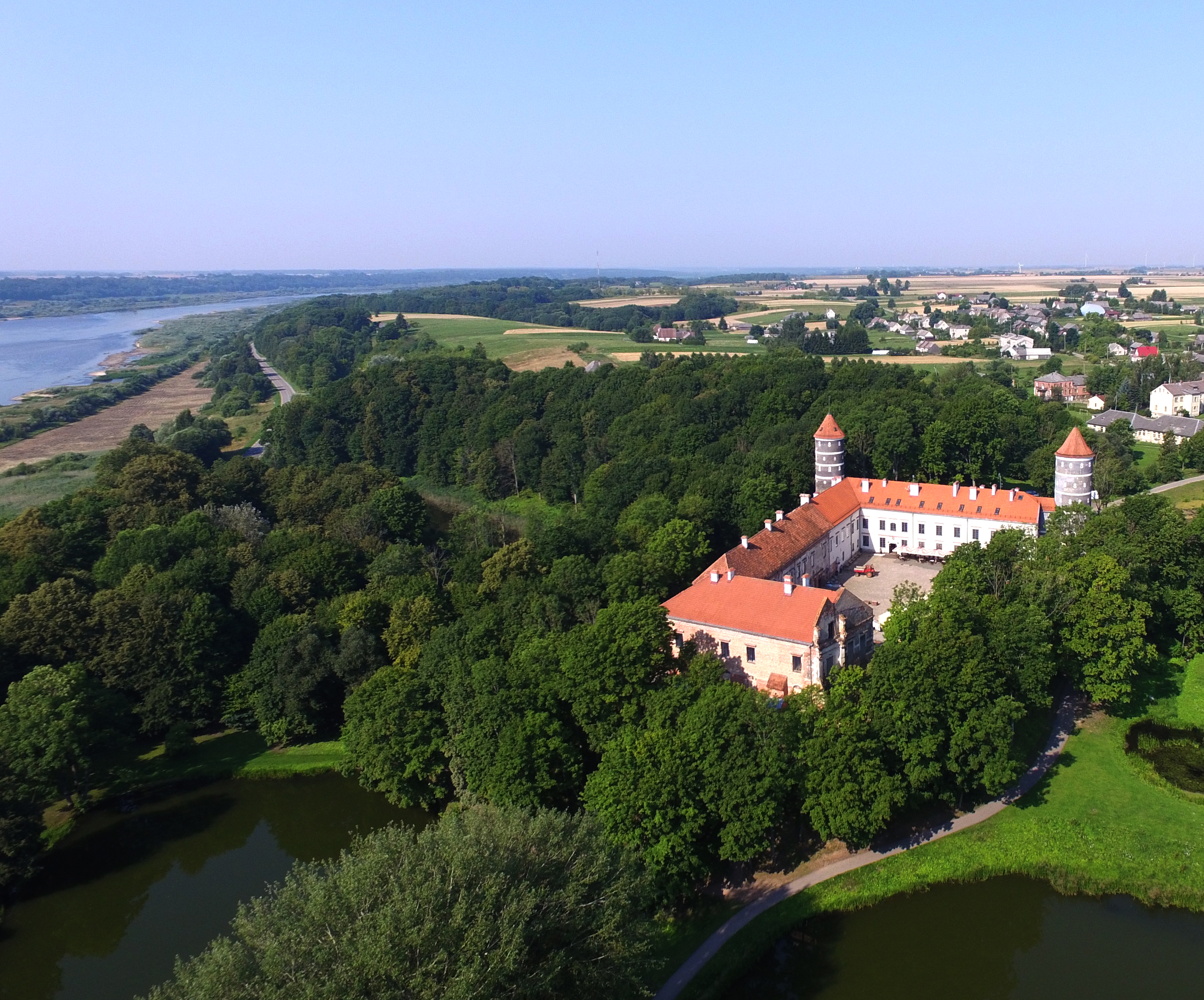
Panemunė Castle
