= Panemunė Castle =

Castle in Lithuania

- Panemunės pilis (Lithuanian)
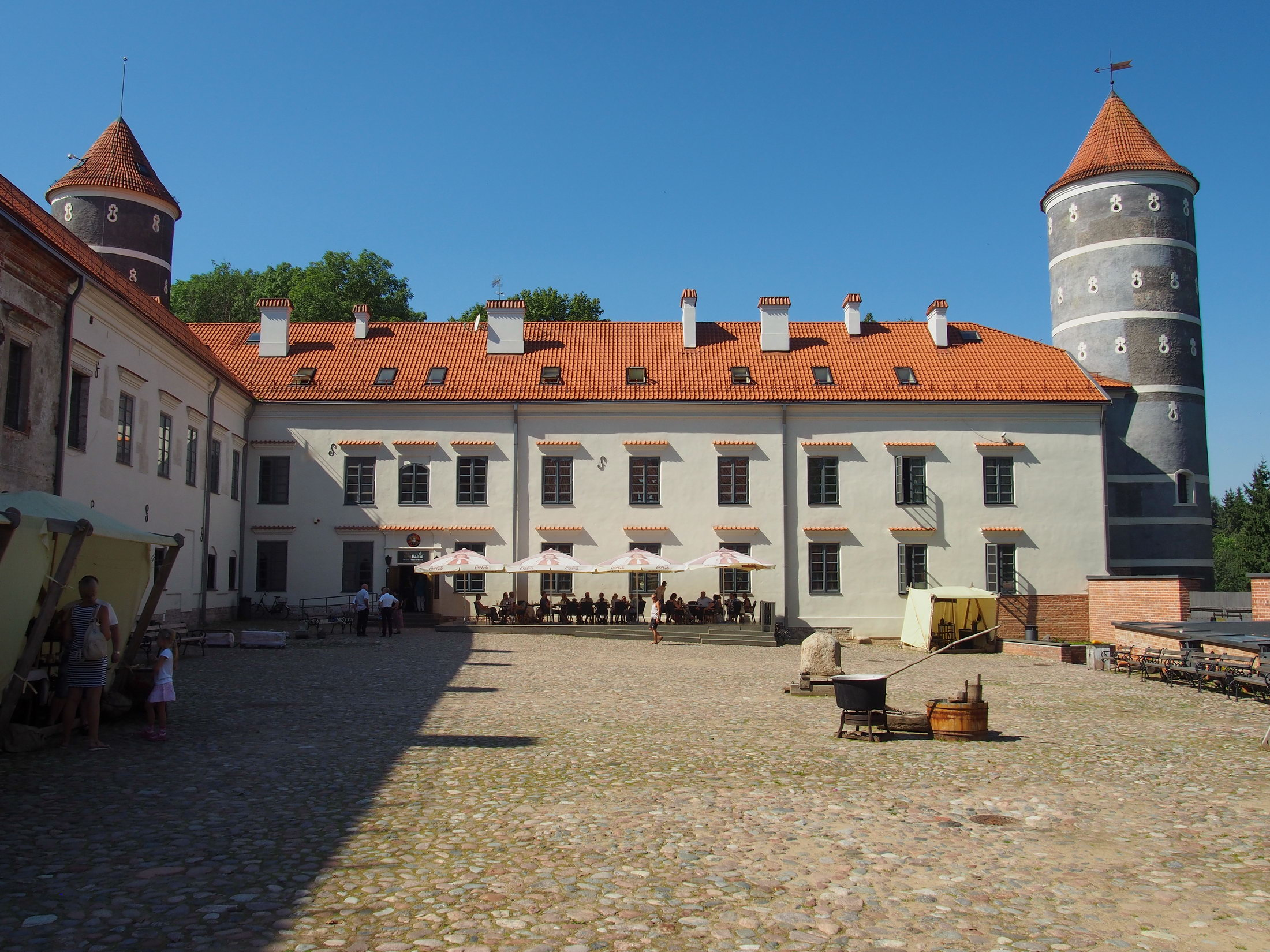
- Panemunė Castle in 2016, main courtyard
- Interactive map of Panemunė Castle
- 55.099°N 22.986°E
- Type: Castle
- Location: Vytėnai, Lithuania

History
- Built: 1313
- Rebuilt: 1604-1610

Site notes
- Architect: Peter Nonhart
- Architectural styles: Renaissance and Late gothic
- Restored: 1958; 2012-2015
- Current use: Museum
- Owner: Vilnius Academy of Arts
- Website: panemunespilis.com

Panemunė Castle (Lithuanian: Panemunės pilis) is a historic castle situated on the banks of the Nemunas River, in the western part of Lithuania. The castle's origins stretch back to the medieval period, evolving through various phases of reconstruction.

== Early history ==
The site of Panemunė Castle has been strategically important due to its location along the Nemunas River, a key waterway in the region that was historically used for trade and military purposes. The earliest traces of the castle date back to the 14th century, during the Lithuanian Crusade when the region was frequently contested between the Grand Duchy of Lithuania and the Teutonic Order, who sought to expand their influence in the Baltic area. It is believed that the first castle was built in 1313 by the Teutonic Order, who called it Christmemel. However, a year later, in 1314, Grand Duke Vytenis of Lithuania attacked the castle with his army and besieged it for 17 days and later captured it. Panemunė Castle likely became the Grand Duke's private residence. These early fortifications were likely a wooden structure. After Teutonic Order was defeated at the Battle of Grunwald the castle lost much of its military significance, and it was repurposed for various administrative and residential uses.

== 16th-17th centuries ==
In 1535, the castle and its lands were granted to the Stankevičius-Bilevičius family of Samogitia by the King-Grand Duke Sigismund the Old, as evidenced by the privilege. The Stankevičius-Bilevičius family constructed a wooden manor house on the grounds of the almost ruined castle. In 1597, the Panemunė Manor was inherited by Stanislovas Stankevičius-Bilevičius, who sold it soon after to János Eperjes, a nobleman of Hungarian descent and timber merchant. Eperjes envisioned a grander residence and commissioned the construction of a new castle. The original wooden structures were replaced by a brick-and-mortar castle between 1604 and 1610. The new castle was designed by the Dutch architect Peter Nonhaardt who also was the author of Vilnius Lower Castle reconstruction project. Two two-storey wings were built: an eastern residential wing and a northern utility wing, connected on the south and west by defensive walls with four-storey towers. The castle showcased a blend of Renaissance and late Gothic elements, reflecting the evolving architectural trends of the time. The Eperješ family would remain the owners of the castle for the next 158 years.

== 18th-19th centuries ==
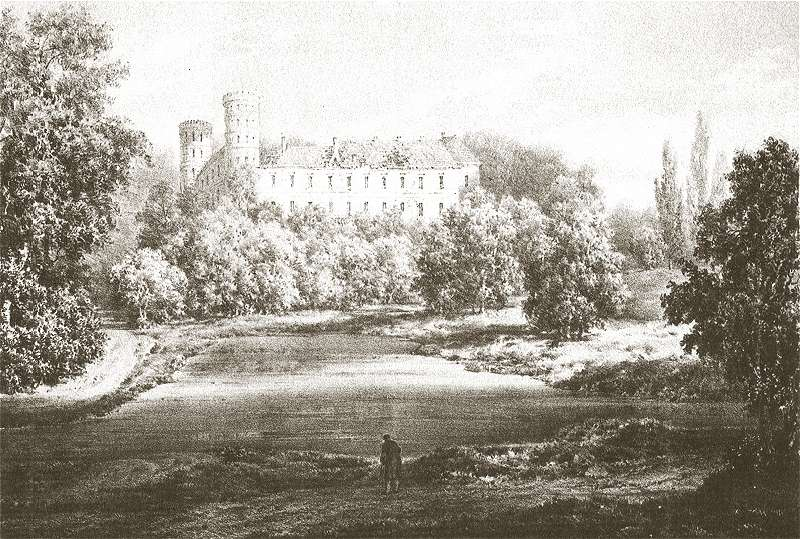
Panemunė Castle in the 19th century depicted by Napoleon Orda

By the close of the 17th century, the Eperjes family's financial situation had deteriorated to such an extent that a portion of their landed estate was mortgaged or sold. During the first half of the 18th century, the family residence fell into disrepair. In 1753, the Eperješ family sold it to Colonel Leonas Igelstromas, the elder of Gulbinai. An inventory of the manor taken in that year reveals the poor state of the property: the castle buildings were dilapidated, the furnaces were burnt out, the ponds in the park had dried up, only one of the four former mills still stood, a dilapidated, roofless stone house was standing to the east of the castle, and the manor house adjacent to the castle was also in a state of neglect. In 1759, Antanas Anupras Gelgaudas, a nobleman from the Duchy of Samogitia and Elder of Samogitia, acquired the castle and renovated it with Baroque and Neo-Classical features. The castle was transformed into a luxurious residence during this period.

After the death of Antanas Anupras Gelgaudas, the castle went to his son Mykolas Gelgaudas, and in 1828, to his wife Eleonora Gelgaudienė and their children Antanas and Jonas. Antanas Gelgaudas became the commander-in-chief of the November Uprising in Lithuania against the Russian Empire but perished in the fights and his brother Jonas fled to Prussia. Following the failed uprising, the castle with all its valuables was confiscated from the Gelgaudas family by the Tsar's authorities. Soon the castle fell into ruin, and much of its original structure was damaged

At the time, there were various proposals for the use of the castle, such as a factory or barracks. None of these proposals were realised. The estate was leased by the tsarist government to various tenants. In 1863, Teodoras Rimkevičius, who had leased the estate, subleased Panemunė to Stanislovas Puslovskis, a relative of the Gelgaudas family. Puslovskis initiated the full restoration of the castle, but the restoration was slow and an eastern wing almost collapsed. In 1903, the Russian painter Nicholas Roerich visited the castle while travelling along the Nemunas River.

== 20th century and present day ==
Following Puslovskis' death in 1905, his daughter Marija Puslovskytė, who was married to Aleksandras Tiškevičius, inherited the estate. However, she did not undertake the restoration of Panemunė Castle. She resided primarily in Tiškevičiai Palace near Palanga, and in 1919, the dilapidated north-east tower of the castle had to be demolished. In 1924, as part of the Lithuanian Land Reforms, Panemunė's lands were expropriated by the state, and the castle was sold at auction. In 1929, Panemunė Castle was acquired by the priest Antanas Petraitis, who hailed from Skirsnemunė and resided in the United States. Petraitis later donated the castle to the Society of Saint Francis de Sales. The new owners did not undertake any restoration work on the castle. Following the death of Petraitis in 1935, Panemunė Castle was transferred to the jurisdiction of the Ministry of Education due to Petraitis's financial debts. From then on the castle became public property. In 1939, Lithuanian authorities did minor restoration conservation of the ruins. Further restoration works were interrupted by World War II and the subsequent occupation of Lithuania by Soviets, during which the castle was vandalized by the Red Army.

Based on Stasys Pinkaus's research, a project for the conservation and partial restoration of Panemunė Castle was prepared in 1955. The project outlined the priority works necessary to rescue the monument from its state of disrepair. Following restoration of independence of Lithuania in 1990, the castle was bestowed to Vilnius Academy of Arts, and restoration works continued.

Presently, works of Vilnius Art Academy students are exhibited in the castle. Panemunė Castle is open to visitors. The castle's grounds houses a museum. Rooms are available for accommodation.

== Architecture ==
Panemunė Castle is an excellent example of Renaissance and Baroque architecture, with elements of late Gothic design. The castle's original construction features a rectangular layout with four corner towers, a defensive wall, and a main building that housed the noble family. The surrounding parkland and the proximity of the Nemunas River added to the castle's picturesque setting. Castle is probably the most authentic residential castle that has survived in Lithuania.

== Gallery ==
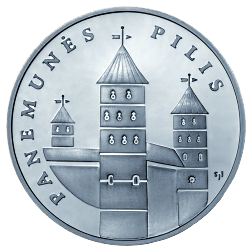
Litas commemorative coin dedicated to Panemunė Castle

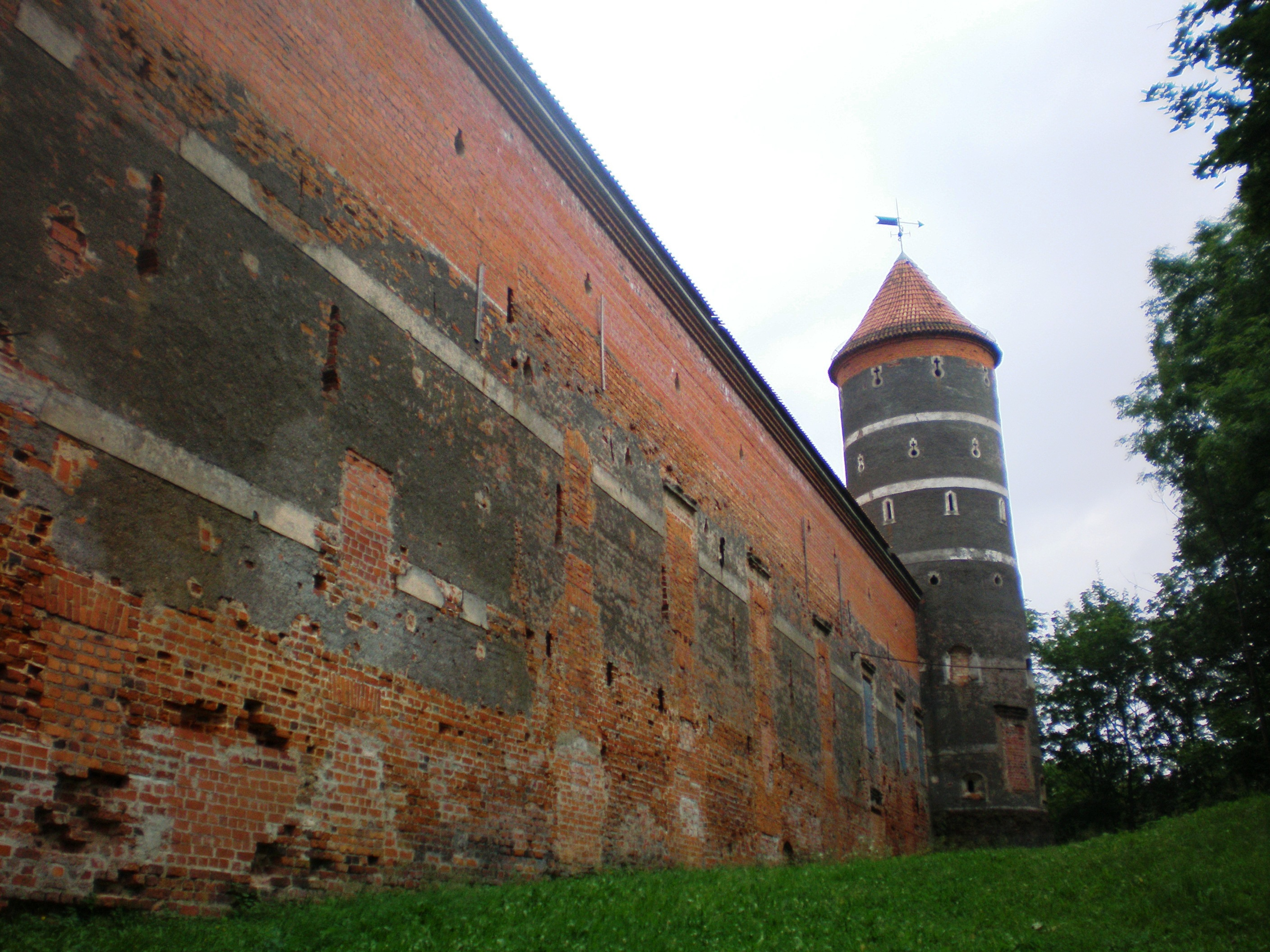
Panemunė castle nowadays

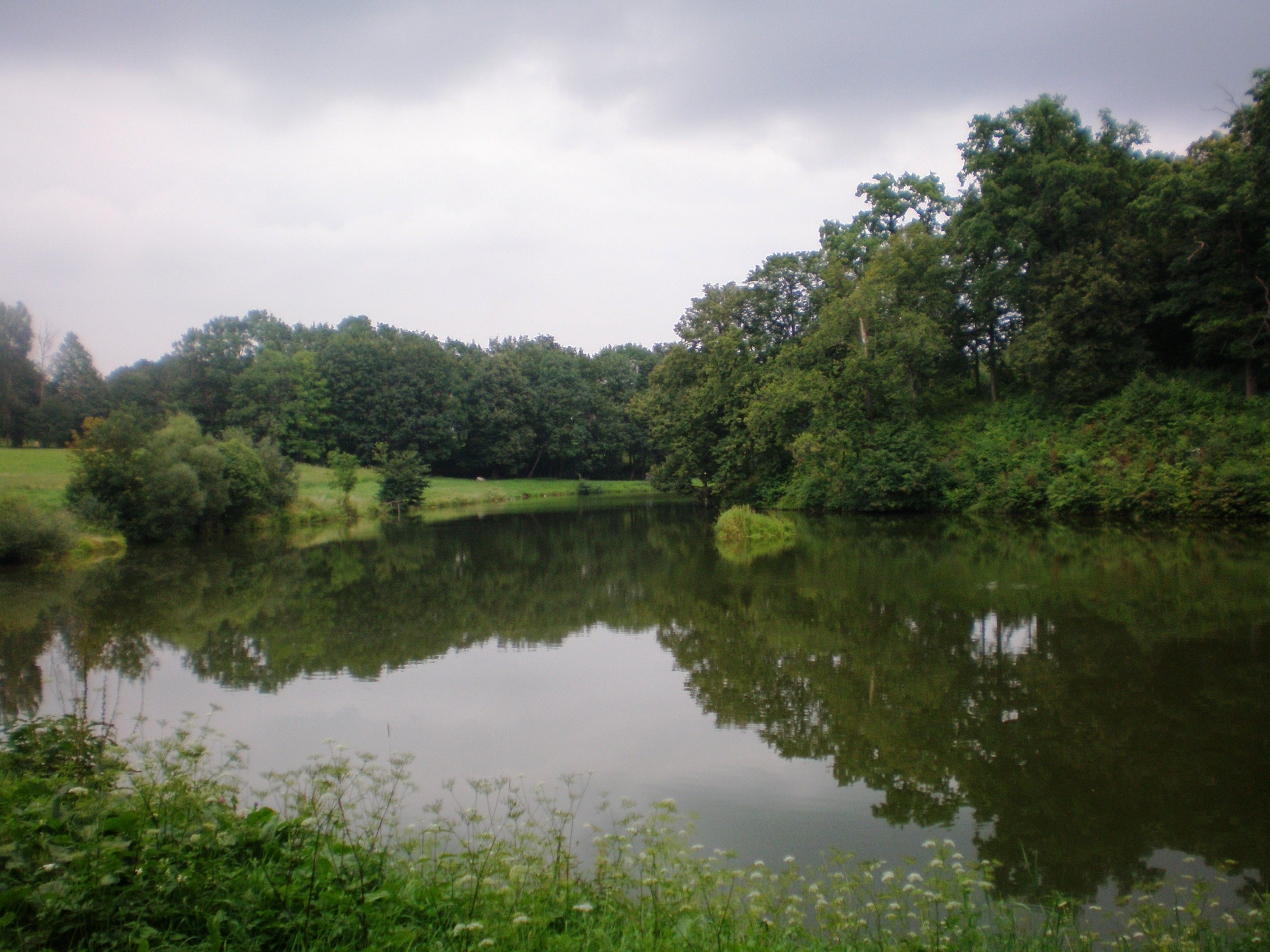
Pond near the castle

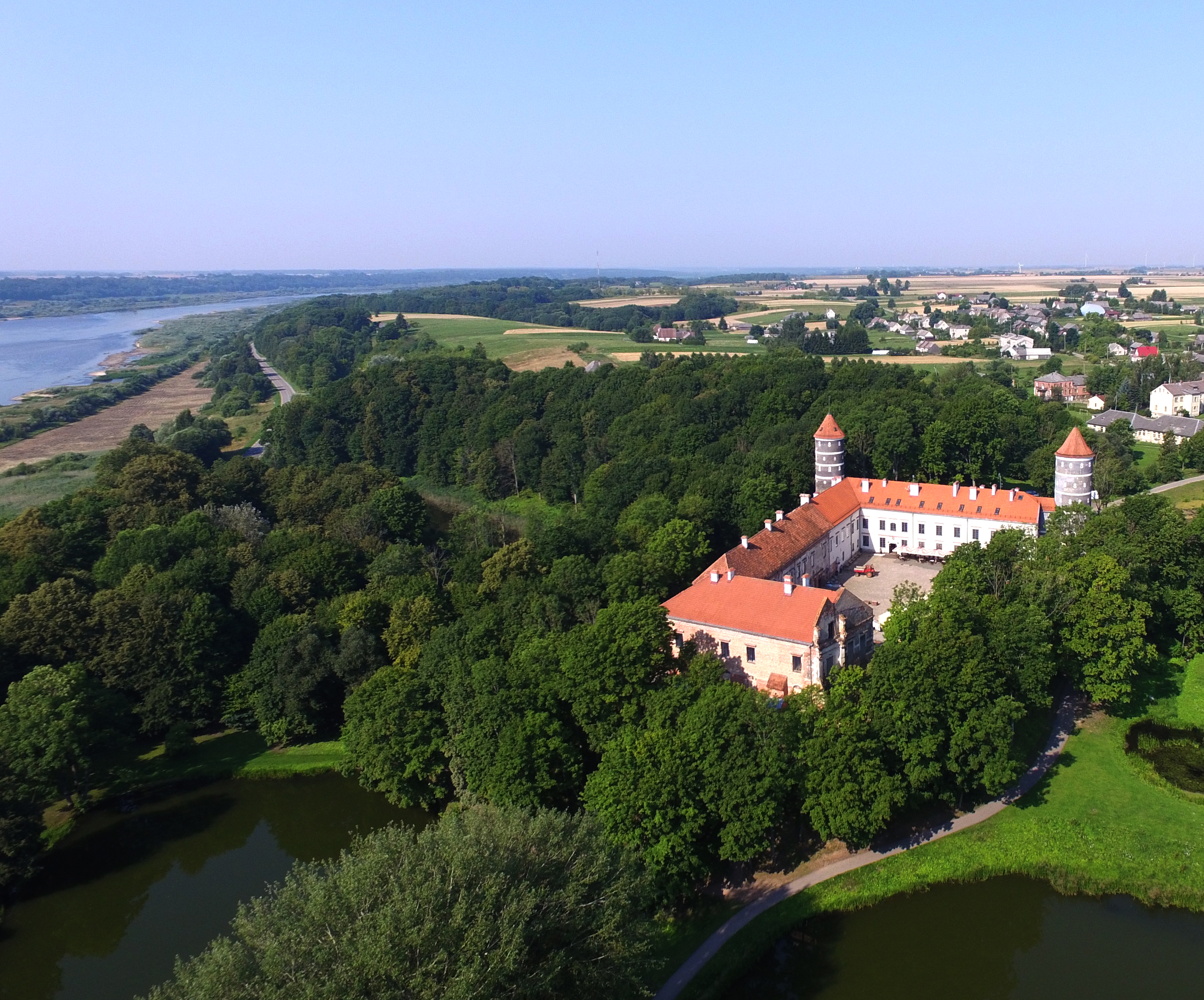
An aerial shot of Panemunė Castle

== See also ==
- List of castles in Lithuania
