= Gornostajiškės Manor =

Coordinates: 54°10′34″N 25°2′12″E

- Gornostajiškių dvaras
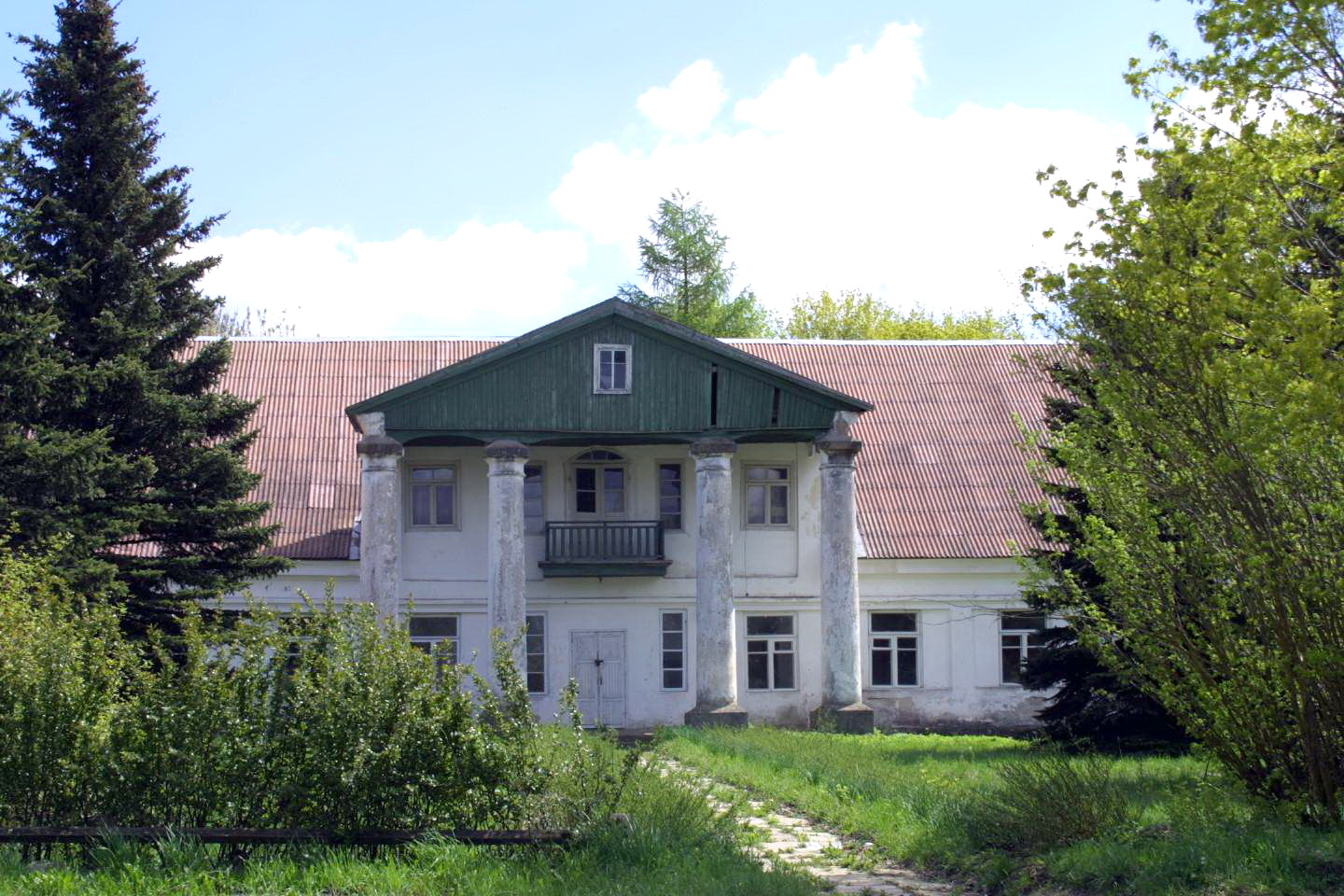
- Gornostajiškės Manor in 2006
- Interactive map of the Gornostajiškės Manor area

General information
- Architectural style: Classical
- Location: Gornostajiškės, Eišiškės Eldership, Šalčininkai District Municipality, Vilnius County, Lithuania
- Year built: 19th century

Gornostajiškės Manor was a former residential manor in Gornostajiškės village, Šalčininkai District Municipality, Lithuania.
