= Eišiškės Eldership =

Eldership of Lithuania

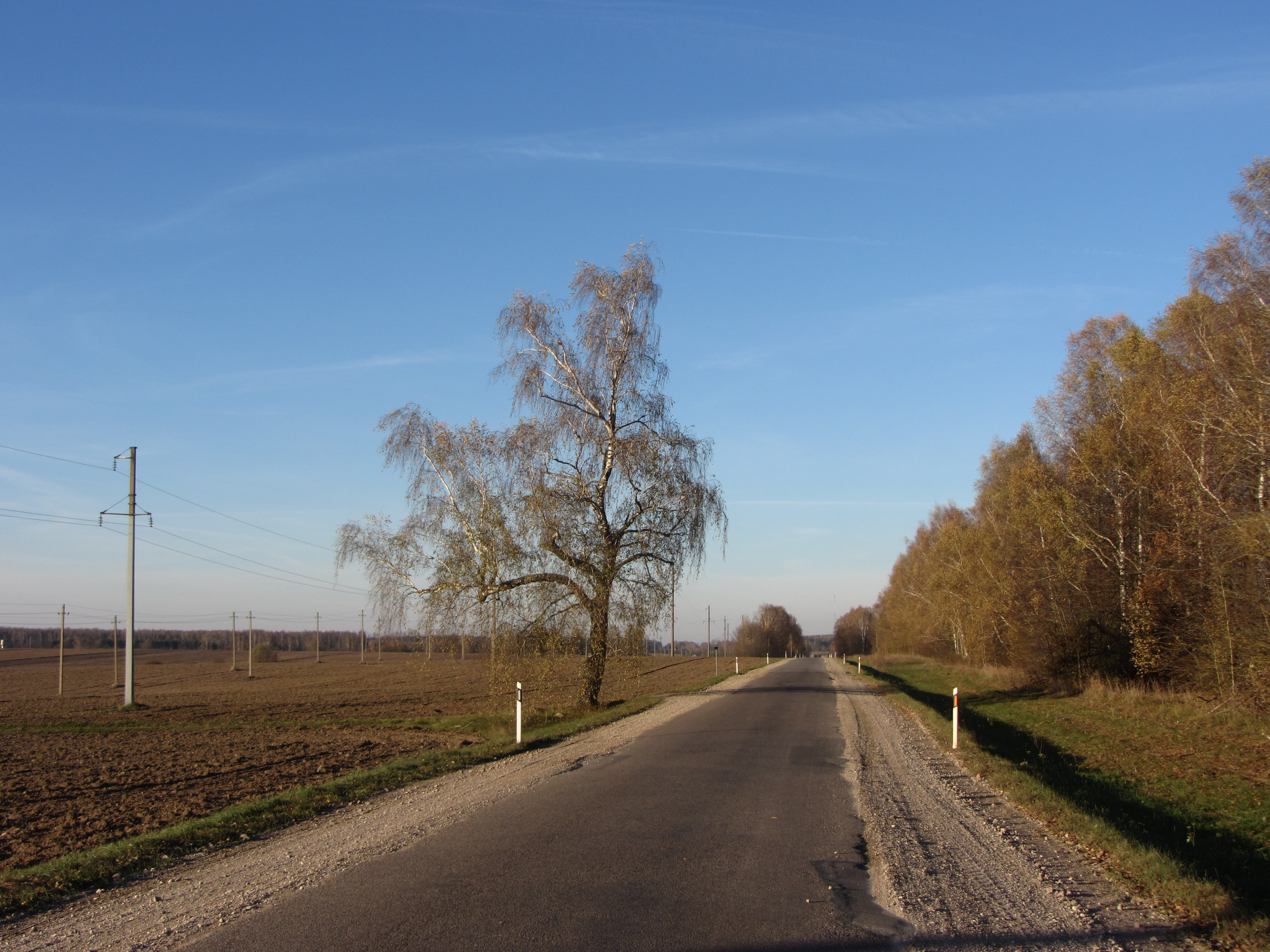
Eišiškių eldership, Lithuania

The Eišiškės Eldership (Lithuanian: Eišiškių seniūnija) is an eldership of Lithuania, located in the Šalčininkai District Municipality. In 2021 its population was 3805.
