= Gražiškiai Eldership =

Eldership of Lithuania

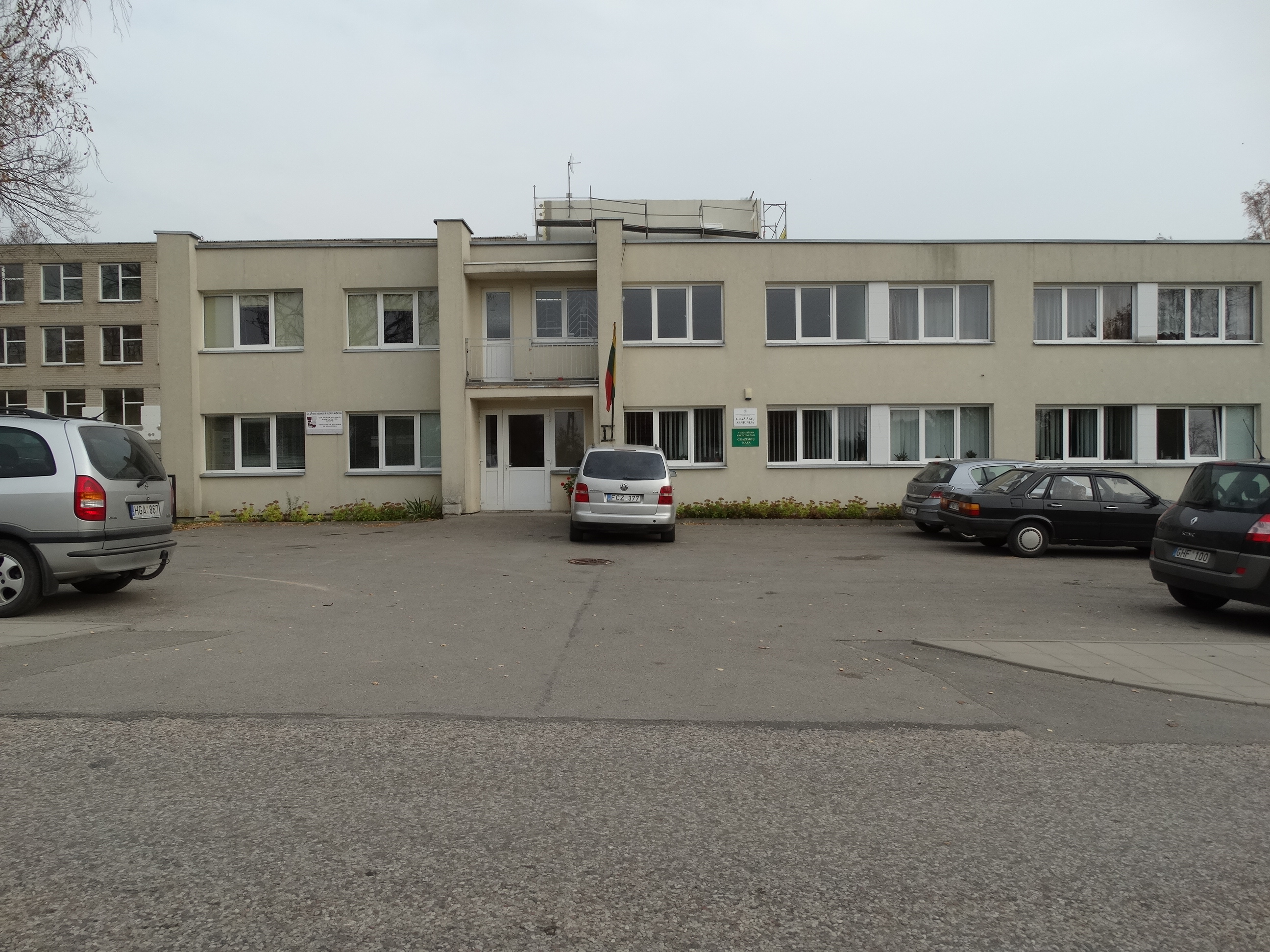
Gražiškiai Eldership, Vilkaviškis district, Lithuania

The Gražiškiai Eldership (Lithuanian: Gražiškių seniūnija) is an eldership of Lithuania, located in the Vilkaviškis District Municipality. In 2021 its population was 703.
