= List of hillforts in Lithuania =

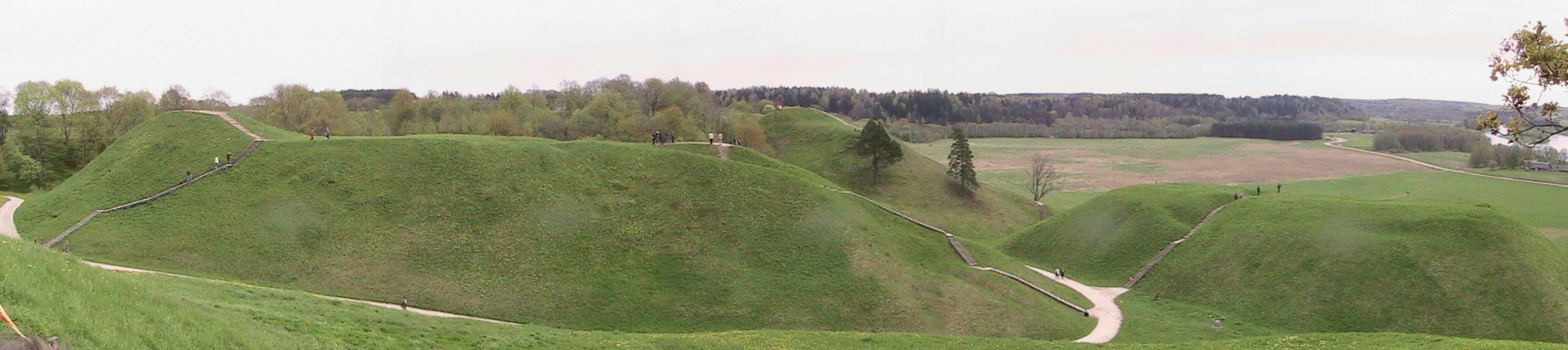
Kernavė Hillforts complex, Kernavė, part of a World Heritage Site

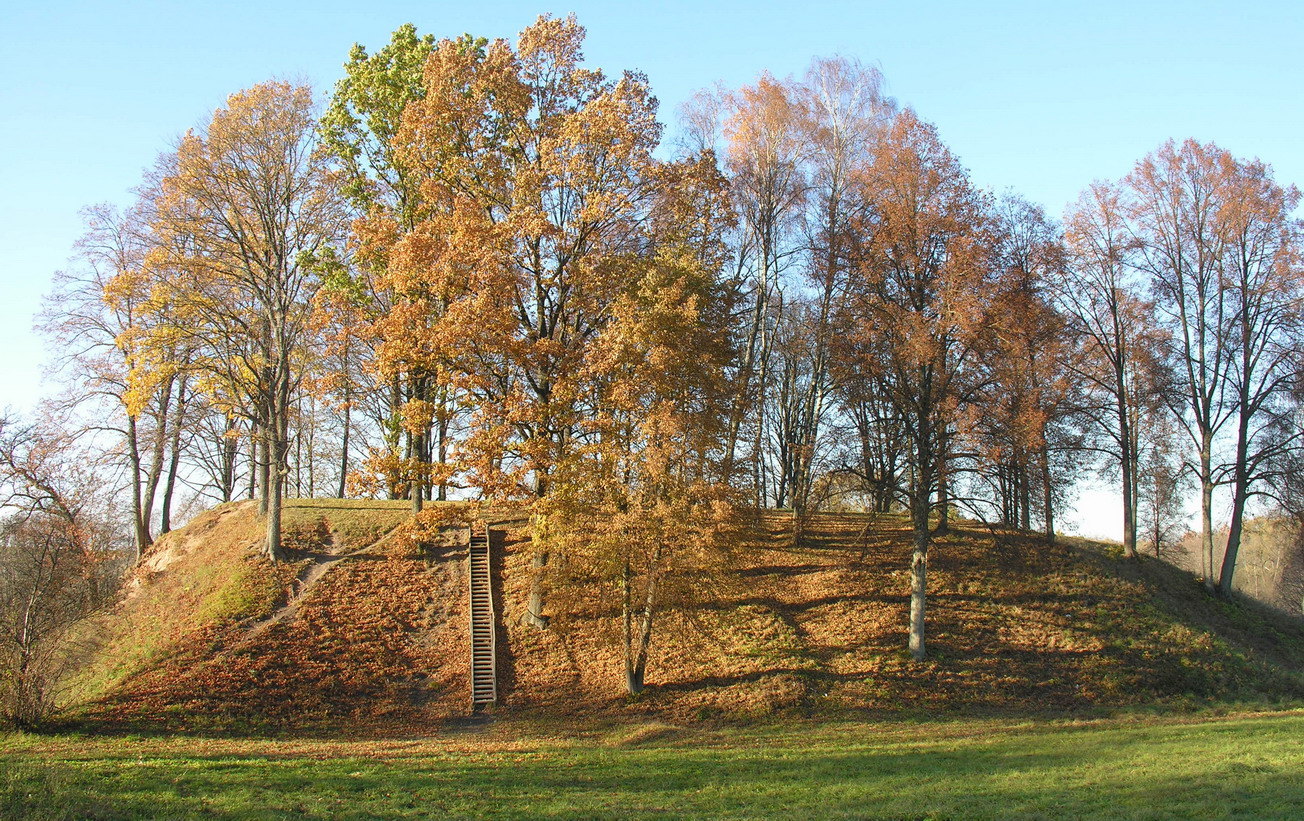
Daubariai Hillfort in Mažeikiai district municipality

Below it the list of hillforts in Lithuania. The first three volumes of the atlas of Lithuanian hillforts (Lietuvos piliakalniai. Atlasas, eds. Z. Baubonis ir G. Zabiela, Vilnius, 2005, vol. I–III) contained 829 entries. The 4th volume (2017) contained additional 92 entries. Most of the latter ones were identified after 2005, but some of the sites were known earlier, and only recently they were classified as hillforts. At the end of vol. 4 there is a list of hillforts grouped by districts and municipalities. As of 2005 only 184 of them were excavated to various extents. To date, a total of 1,008 hillforts have been identified in Lithuania.

"Hillfort" is piliakalnis in Lithianian. The word literally means "castle mound" and refers to wooden castles that stood on tops of these mounds. Since 14th century, with the appearance of brick and stone castles, the wooden ones were abandoned and decayed, and today the root "pilis" in "piliakalnis" refers to a castle only etymologically. In modern times, about one and half thousand places are called piliakalnis, not all of them are real hillforts (defined as elements of terrain with external earth fortifications of closed type with traces of the activity of ancient people within). A number of similar-looking objects are not hillforts in the archaeological sense, but rather temporary field fortifications, remnants of fortified manors, etc., dated by XVI-XVII centuries.

Detailed information about Lithuanian hillforts is collected at the website Lietuvos Piliakalniai ("Lithuanian Hillforts"), a virtual database maintained by the Cultural Heritage Preservation Force. The database can be browsed by districts and its texts are searchable.

The information about the protection status of hillforts and further references can be found in the overall Lithuanian Register of Cultural Heritage.

== Akmenė District ==
Name	Other names	Location(s)
Luokava mound; lt:Luokavos kalnas	Luokavos piliakalnis, Lokava, Kerėžių piliakalnis	Kerėžiai
Papilė hillfort; lt:Papilės piliakalnis	Papilės I piliakalnis	Papilė
Papilė II hillfort; lt:Papilės II piliakalnis	Pašalpos kalnas	Papilė
Viliošiai hillfort; lt:Viliošių piliakalnis	Pilalė	Viliošiai

== Alytus ==
Name	Other names	Location(s)
Alytus hillfort; lt:Alytaus piliakalnis	Vienuolyno kalnas, Šv.Jono kalnas, Joninių kalnas	Alytus
Radžiūnai hillfort; lt:Radžiūnų piliakalnis	Pilalė, Alytaus II piliakalnis	Radžiūnai

== Alytus District ==
Name	Other names	Location(s)
Aniškis Hillfort	Arminai Hillfort / Arminų piliakalnis	Aniškis
Atesninkai Hillfort	Atesninkėlių piliakalnis	Atesninkai
Bazorai Hillfort		Bazorai
Bundorių piliakalnis	Panemunininkų piliakalnis	Bundoriai
Dambavaragio piliakalnis	Ąžuolų Ragas, Ąžuolinių piliakalnis, Bambininkų piliakalnis	Bambininkai
Daugų piliakalnis		Daugai
Dirmiškių piliakalnis	Strumpakalnis	Dirmiškės
Dubių piliakalnis		Dubiai (Alytus)
Einoronių piliakalnis	Pilies kalnas	Einoronys
Gerulių piliakalnis	Zamkus	Geruliai (Alytus)
Giluičių piliakalnis		Giluičiai
Kaukų piliakalnis	Obelytės II piliakalnis, Pranevičių piliakalnis	Kaukai
Krištapiškių piliakalnis	Pieriškių piliakalnis	Pieriškiai
Kružiūnų piliakalnis		Kružiūnai
Laukininkų piliakalnis	Svirnakalnis	Laukininkai
Margaravos piliakalnis	Raudonkalnis, Dubių piliakalnis, Kederiškių piliakalnis, Margirio kalnas	Margarava
Margaravos II piliakalnis		Margarava
Margio kalnas	Punios piliakalnis	Punia
Nemunaičio piliakalnis	Liūno piliakalnis	Nemunaitis
Obelijos piliakalnis	Zaramkalnis, Obelytės 3-iojo kaimo piliakalnis	Obelija (kaimas)
Obelytės piliakalnis	Kaukų II piliakalnis, Nugaros kalnas, Zomkus	Kaukai
Papėčių piliakalnis		Papėčiai
Piliakalnio piliakalnis (Alytus)		Piliakalnis (Alytus)
Pivašiūnų piliakalnis		Pivašiūnai
Pociūniškių piliakalnis	Vinkšninių piliakalnis	Pociūniškės
Poteronių piliakalnis	Milžinų kalnas	Poteronys
Radžiūnai II		Radžiūnai
Radžiūnai III		Radžiūnai
Rumbonių piliakalnis	Mikutiškių piliakalnis	Rumbonys
Zaramciškių piliakalnis	Galiertiškės piliakalnis, Zamkakalnis	Milastonys
Žilvios piliakalnis	Pupasodžio piliakalnis, Tolkūnų piliakalnis	Pupasodis, Tolkūnai (Alytus)

== Anykščiai District ==
Name	Other names	Location(s)
Bijeikių piliakalnis	Papilio kalnas	Bijeikiai (Anykščiai)
Buivydų piliakalnis	Klevėnų piliakalnis	Buivydai (Anykščiai)
Burios piliakalnis		Buria
Buteikių piliakalnis		Buteikiai (Anykščiai)
Jakūnų piliakalnis		Jakūnai
Jašiškio piliakalnis	Baltušavos piliakalnis, Švedkapis, Švedkalnis	Jašiškis, Baltušava
Jonydžių piliakalnis	Balnakalnis	Jonydžiai
Kalvelių piliakalnis		Kalveliai (Skiemonys)
Lašinių piliakalnis		Lašiniai (Anykščiai)
Levaniškių piliakalnis	Piliakalnio piliakalnis	Piliakalnis, Levaniškiai (Anykščiai)
Liudiškių piliakalnis		Liudiškiai
Marijampolio piliakalnis	Piktagalio piliakalnis	Piktagalys
Melėnų piliakalnis	Pilies kalnas, Pilelė	Melėnai (Anykščiai)
Paberžės piliakalnis		Paberžė
Palatavio piliakalnis		Palatavys
Papilių piliakalnis (Anykščiai)	Kaukazas	Papiliai (Anykščiai)
Piliakalnio piliakalnis (Anykščiai)		Piliakalnis
Riklikų piliakalnis		Riklikai
Rubikių piliakalnis	Pertakas	Rubikiai
Svirnų piliakalnis	Žemųjų Svirnų piliakalnis, Žiogų piliakalnis	Svirnai II, Žiogai (Anykščiai)
Šeimyniškėlių piliakalnis	Vorutos piliakalnis	Šeimyniškėliai
Šovenių piliakalnis	Budrių piliakalnis, Pakarklos kalnas	Šoveniai, Budriai (Anykščiai)
Trakinių piliakalnis	Milžinkapis	Trakiniai
Vargulių piliakalnis		Varguliai
Varniškių piliakalnis	Kartakalnis	Varniškės
Varnupio piliakalnis		Varnupys (Anykščiai)
Vilkatėnų piliakalnis		Vilkatėnai

== Birštonas Municipality ==
Name	Other names	Location(s)
Babronių piliakalnis	Pilies kalnas	Babronys
Birštono piliakalnis	Vytauto kalnas	Birštonas
Matiešionių piliakalnis		Matiešionys
Nemajūnų piliakalnis	Pilalė	Nemajūnai (Birštonas)
Paverknių piliakalnis	Ginkaus kalnas	Paverkniai
Pelėšiškių piliakalnis		Pelėšiškės
Pelėšiškių II piliakalnis	Mišiškių piliakalnis	Pelėšiškės
Šaltinėnų piliakalnis	Aštrusis kalnas, Šaltinėlių piliakalnis	Šaltinėnai
Šilėnų piliakalnis	Aštrusis kalnas	Šilėnai (Birštonas)

== Biržai District ==
Name	Other names	Location(s)
Klausučių piliakalnis		Klausučiai (Biržai)
Mažutiškių piliakalnis	Migdoliškių piliakalnis	Mažutiškiai
Papilio piliakalnis	Zamkelis	Papilys
Rinkuškių piliakalnis	Juodelių piliakalnis, Velniakalnis, Velnio pilis	Rinkuškiai
Žiobų piliakalnis		Žiobos

== Druskininkai Municipality ==
Name	Other names	Location(s)
Černiauskų piliakalnis	Leipalingio piliakalnis	Černiauskai, Leipalingis
Viečiūnų piliakalnis		Viečiūnai

== Elektrėnai Municipality ==
Name	Other names	Location(s)
Balandiškių piliakalnis	Pilies kalnas	Balandiškės (Elektrėnai)
Balceriškių piliakalnis		Balceriškės
Beižionių piliakalnis	Birutės kalnas	Beižionys
Grabijolų piliakalnis		Grabijolai
Kalninių Mijaugonių piliakalnis	Pilies kalnas	Kalniniai Mijaugonys
Karageliškių piliakalnis		Karageliškės
Latvių piliakalnis	Pilies kalnas, Mitkitškių piliakalnis	Latviai (Elektrėnai)
Paalkių piliakalnis		Paalkiai
Pipiriškių piliakalnis	Pasamanės piliakalnis, Juodasis kalnas	Pipiriškės, Pasamanė (Elektrėnai)
Žuvyčių piliakalnis		Žuvyčiai

== Ignalina District ==
Name	Other names	Location(s)
Antagavės piliakalnis		Antagavė
Ažubalio piliakalnis	Bajorų piliakalnis	Ažubalis (Ignalina)
Ažušilės piliakalnis		Ažušilė
Bajorų piliakalnis	Leoniškės piliakalnis, Černagurka, Dūdinių piliakalnis	Bajorai
Čeberakų piliakalnis	Bažnytkalnis	Čeberakai
Dūkštelių I piliakalnis	Senojo Dūkšto piliakalnis, Pažemiškio piliakalnis	Dūkštas
Dūkštelių II piliakalnis	Putrakalnis	Dūkštas
Garbšių piliakalnis	Juodkalnis	Garbšiai
Ginučių piliakalnis	Papiliakalnės piliakalnis	Ginučiai, Papiliakalnė
Ginučių II piliakalnis	Pilalė	Ginučiai
Jakaviškių piliakalnis	Piliakalnis	Jakaviškiai
Kazlupiškės piliakalnis		Kazlupiškė
Linkmenų piliakalnis	Pilelė	Linkmenys
Mažulonių piliakalnis	Vėlionių piliakalnis	Mažulonys, Vėlionys
Mieliatilčio piliakalnis		Mieliatiltis
Papiliakalnės piliakalnis	Ginučių piliakalnis	Ginučiai, Papiliakalnė
Papravalės piliakalnis	Plikasis kalnas	Papravalė
Paragiškės piliakalnis		Paragiškė
Pasamanės piliakalnis		Pasamanė (Ignalina)
Pūškų piliakalnis		Pūškos
Puziniškio piliakalnis		Puziniškis
Ruokiškės piliakalnis		Ruokiškė
Senojo Daugėliškio piliakalnis	Kiškio Bažnyčia	Senasis Daugėliškis
Senosios Katinautiškės piliakalnis		Senoji Katinautiškė
Sokiškių piliakalnis	Juodžeminis kalnas	Sokiškiai
Strakšiškės piliakalnis	Ropiakalnis	Strakšiškė
Tolimėnų piliakalnis	Bakanėliai	Tolimėnai (Ignalina)
Vaškonių piliakalnis		Vaškonys
Vėderinių piliakalnis	Barsukalnis	Vėderiniai

== Jonava District ==
Name	Other names	Location(s)
Batėgalos piliakalnis		Batėgala
Dubių piliakalnis	Užupių piliakalnis, Batarėja	Dubiai (Jonava)
Gudžionių piliakalnis	Lokėnėlių II piliakalnis	Gudžioniai
Laukagalių piliakalnis	Milžinų kalnas	Laukagaliai (Šilai)
Lokėnėlių piliakalnis	Gudžionių II piliakalnis, Žvalgakalnis	Lokėnėliai, Gudžioniai
Mažųjų Žinėnų piliakalnis		Mažieji Žinėnai
Normainių piliakalnis	Zomkus	Normainiai
Paberžės piliakalnis		Paberžė (Jonava)
Padaigų piliakalnis	Smailiakalnis	Padaigai
Padaigų II piliakalnis	Marčiakalnis	Padaigai
Padaigų III piliakalnis		Padaigai
Piliakalnių piliakalnis	Pilies kalnas, Pilalė	Piliakalniai (Jonava)
Ruklos piliakalnis	Koplyčkalnis	Rukla
Stašėnų piliakalnis		Stašėnai
Tartoko piliakalnis	Koplyčkalnis	Tartokas
Žeimių piliakalnis	Jasnagurka	Žeimiai

== Joniškis District ==
Name	Other names	Location(s)
Kalnelis hillfort	Sidabrė, Gurkiai	Kalnelis
Žagarė II hillfort	Raktuvės kalnas	Žagarė
Žagarė I hillfort	Aukštadvaris Plikasis Kalnas, Žvelgaičio kalnas	Žagarė

== Jurbarkas District ==
Name	Other names	Location(s)
Antkalnės piliakalnis	Naujokų piliakalnis, Gystėnų piliakalnis, Milžino kapas	Antkalnė, Naujokai (Jurbarkas)
Antkalniškių piliakalnis		Antkalniškiai
Bišpilio piliakalnis	Jurbarko piliakalnis, Višpilis, Viešpilys	
Eržvilko piliakalnis	Pilė	Eržvilkas
lt:Kalnėnų piliavietė	Bišpiliukai	Kalnėnai (Jurbarkas)
lt:Kartupėnų piliakalnis, see Bisenė	Kiaukalnis, Sargutis	Kartupėnai
Meškininkų piliakalnis	Bišpiliukas	Meškininkai
Pašilių piliakalnis	Bajorkalnis, Pilis	Pašiliai (Jurbarkas)
Raudonėnų piliakalnis		Raudonėnai
Seredžiaus piliakalnis	Palemono kalnas	Seredžius
Seredžiaus II piliakalnis	Palocėliai, Piliavietė	Seredžius
Skirsnemunės piliakalnis		Skirsnemunė
Veliuonos piliakalnis	Pilies kalnas, Ramybės kalnas	Veliuona
Veliuonos piliakalnis	Gedimino kapas, Gedimino kalnas	Veliuona
Veliuonos II piliakalnis	Pilaitės, Bajerburgas	Veliuona

== Kaišiadorys District ==
Name	Other names	Location(s)
Balceriškių piliakalnis		Balceriškės (Kaišiadorys)
Basonių piliakalnis		Basonys
Bijautonių piliakalnis		Bijautonys
Budelių piliakalnis	Skarbo kalnas, Skarbas	Budeliai
Buivydonių piliakalnis		Buivydonys
Burčiakų piliakalnis		Burčiakai
Būtkiemio piliakalnis		Būtkiemis
Dabintos piliakalnis		Dabinta
Darsūniškio piliakalnis		Darsūniškis
Dovainonių piliakalnis	Kapitoniškių piliakalnis	Dovainonys
Gegužinio piliakalnis		Gegužinis
Maisiejūnų piliakalniai		Maisiejūnai
Mančiūnų piliakalnis		Mančiūnai (Kaišiadorys)
Migonių piliakalnis		Migonys (Kaišiadorys)
Mūro Strėvininkų piliakalnis		Mūro Strėvininkai
Napoleono kalnas	Lašinių piliakalnis	Lašiniai (Kaišiadorys)
Palapainės piliakalnis	Vilūnų piliakalnis, Lapainios piliakalnis	Lapainia
Paparčių piliakalnis	Žydkapis	Paparčiai (Kaišiadorys)
Paparčių II piliakalnis	Pilies kalnas	Paparčiai (Kaišiadorys)
Papartėlių piliakalnis		Papartėliai (Kaišiadorys)
Pridotkų piliakalnis	Žukų piliakalnis	Pridotkai
Rokiškių piliakalnis		Rokiškės I
Rumšiškių piliakalnis	Kaukapilis	Rumšiškės
Strumilų piliakalnis		Strumilai
Varkališkių I piliakalnis	Juodkočių piliakalnis, Lapainios piliakalnis	Varkališkės (Kaišiadorys)
Varkališkių II piliakalnis		Varkališkės (Kaišiadorys)
Visginų piliakalnis		Visginai
Žaslių piliakalnis		Žasliai

== Kalvarija Municipality ==
Name	Other names	Location(s)
Dirvonų piliakalnis		Dirvonai (Kalvarija)
Kampinių piliakalnis	Apšutkalnis	Kampiniai (Kalvarija)
Menkupių piliakalnis		Menkupiai
Naujienėlės piliakalnis	Aukštakalnis, Kovakalnis	Naujienėlė
Navininkų piliakalnis		Navininkai (Kalvarija)
Papiliakalnių piliakalnis	Piliakalnis, Pavyžupio piliakalnis, Makauskų piliakalnis	Papiliakalniai
Žaliosios piliakalnis		

== Kaunas ==
Name	Other names	Location(s)
Aukštųjų Šančių piliakalnis		Aukštieji Šančiai
Eigulių piliakalnis		Eiguliai
Marvelės piliakalnis	Marvos kalnas	Marvelė
Napoleon's Hill; lt:Jiesios piliakalnis	Napoleono kalnas	Jiesia (Kaunas)
Veršvų piliakalnis	Vilijampolės piliakalnis	Veršvai
Vieškūnų piliakalnis	Amalių piliakalnis, Šuneliškių kalnas	Vieškūnai

== Kaunas District ==
Name	Other names	Location(s)
Altonos piliakalnis	Altoniškių piliakalnis	Altoniškiai
Antalkių piliakalnis		Antalkiai
Bernatonių piliakalnis		Bernatoniai (Kaunas)
Butvilonių piliakalnis	Butvilionių piliakalnis	
Dubravų piliakalnis	Barsukalnis	Dubravai
Girionių piliakalnis		Girionys
Guogų piliakalnis	Piliuonos piliakalnis	Guogai, Piliuona
Jadagonių piliakalnis	Raguvos kalnas	Jadagoniai
Jaučakių piliakalnis	Kartuvių kalnas	Jaučakiai
Karmėlavos piliakalnis	Pilis	Karmėlava
Lentainių piliakalnis	Lantainių piliakalnis, Kleboniškių piliakalnis, Pekelka	Lentainiai
Lepšiškių piliakalnis	Batareika	Lepšiškiai
Marvelės II piliakalnis	Noreikiškių piliakalnis	Noreikiškės
Naujasodžio piliakalnis (Karmėlava)	Vaistariškių piliakalnis	Naujasodis (Karmėlava)
Pakalniškių piliakalnis		Pakalniškiai (Kaunas)
Paštuvos piliakalnis		Paštuva
Piepalių piliakalnis	Babtyno piliakalnis	Piepaliai
Pyplių piliakalnis		Pypliai (Kaunas)
Ringovės piliakalnis	Linksmakalnis, Pilikė	Ringovė
Samylų piliakalnis		Samylai
Samylų II piliakalnis		Samylai
Šančių piliakalnis	Pikelnia, Kepeliušas	Šančiai (village)
Vainatrakio piliakalnis	Prūskapinė	Vainatrakis
Vikūnų piliakalnis	Kapčius	Vikūnai
Virbališkių piliakalnis		Virbališkiai (Kaunas)
Žiegždrių piliakalnis		Žiegždriai

== Kazlų Rūda Municipality ==
Name	Other names	Location(s)
Griešių piliakalnis	Rūdupio piliakalnis	Griešiai

== Kėdainiai District ==
Name	Other names	Location(s)
Ambraziūnų piliakalnis		Ambraziūnai
Bakainių piliakalnis	Pilis	Bakainiai
Kalnaberžės piliakalnis	Plyčkalnis	Kalnaberžė
Lomeikiškių piliakalnis	Krasausko kalnas, Prancūzkapiai	Lomeikiškiai
Naujaupio piliakalnis	Pilionių piliakalnis, Piliukas	Naujaupis, Pilioniai
Pilsupių piliakalnis	Bakanas	Pilsupiai
Plinkaigalio piliakalnis		Plinkaigalis
Sangailų piliakalnis	Šėtos piliakalnis, Piliakalnių piliakalnis, Stagių piliakalnis	Sangailai, Šėta
Stašaičių piliakalnis	Švedkapis	Stašaičiai
Šukionių piliakalnis		Šukioniai (Kėdainiai)
Vaidatonių piliakalnis	Močėnų piliakalnis, Žalnierka	Vaidatoniai, Močėnai
Vosbučių piliakalnis	Pilaitės kalnas	Vosbučiai

== Kelmė District ==
Name	Other names	Location(s)
Badauskių piliakalnis		Badauskiai
Bulavėnų piliakalnis		Bulavėnai
Bumbulių piliakalnis	Bumbulių gynybinis įtvirtinimas	Bumbuliai (Kelmė)
Burbaičių piliakalnis	Piliukai	Piliukai, Burbaičiai
Burniškės piliakalnis		Burniškė
Gabriejolės piliakalnis		Gabriejolė
Galinių piliakalnis	Papušio piliakalnis, Pilikė	Galiniai (Kelmė)
Galvydiškių piliakalnis	Pilikė	Galvydiškės
Gaučiškės piliakalnis	Liolių piliakalnis, Vainikės kalnas	Gaučiškė
Gudelių piliakalnis	Pilikė	Gudeliai
Kalniškių piliakalnis	Biržės kalnas, Spakainastis, Pilis	Kalniškiai
Karklėnalių piliakalnis	Biržkalnis	Karklėnaliai
Pagryžuvio piliakalnis	Pilės kalnas, Kalvinų kalnas	Pagryžuvys
Papilalio piliakalnis	Pilalė, Kilonių piliakalnis	Papilalis
Papilių piliakalnis	Pilis	Papiliai (Kelmė)
Papušinio piliakalnis	Kubilių piliakalnis, Birutkalnis	Kubiliai (Kelmė), Papušynys (Kelmė)
Paspąsčio piliakalnis	Maldokalnis, Sponstis	Paspąstis
Pažvarkulio piliakalnis	Alkakalnis	Pažvarkulis
Piltinės piliakalnis	Bukantiškės, Piliakalnio piliakalnis	Bukantiškė
Plūsčių piliakalnis	Pilikė	Plūsčios
Puikiškės piliakalnis		Puikiškė
Šeduviškės piliakalnis	Šankių piliakalnis	Šeduviškė
Šilgalio piliakalnis	Pilikė	Šilgalis
Šilo Pavėžupio piliakalnis	Gaidžiapilis	Pavėžupis
Tytuvėnų piliakalnis	Bridvaišio piliakalnis	Tytuvėnai
Vaidatonių piliakalnis	Šimkaičių piliakalnis	Vaidatoniai (Kelmė)
Vainagių piliakalnis	Piliukas	Vainagiai (Kelmė)

== Klaipėda ==
Name	Other names	Location(s)
Kalniškių piliakalnis	Pois	Klaipėda
Purmalių piliakalnis		Purmaliai
Žardės piliakalnis	Kuncų piliakalnis, Bandužių piliakalnis, Pilies kalnas	Žardė, Bandužiai

== Klaipėda District ==
Name	Other names	Location(s)
Antkalnio piliakalnis	Gribžinių piliakalnis, Pilalė	Antkalnis (Klaipėda), Gribžiniai
Daukšaičių piliakalnis	Senosios kapinės	Daukšaičiai
Dovilų piliakalnis	Gedminų pilis, Muškalnis, Pilalė	Dovilai
Eketės piliakalnis		Eketė (Klaipėda)
Gargždų piliakalnis	Kalniškės piliakalnis	Gargždai
Gerduvėnų piliakalnis	Pilalė	Gerduvėnai
Gibišių piliakalnis		Gibišiai
Jakų piliakalnis	Sudmantų piliakalnis, Mozūriškių piliakalnis, Piltinės piliakalnis	Jakai
Jogučių piliakalnis	Kukūdra	Jogučiai, Stančiai
Kukuliškių piliakalnis	Melnaragio piliakalnis	Kukuliškiai
Laistų piliakalnis	Liliškių piliakalnis, Pilies kalnas, Švedų pylimas	Laistai
Lapių piliakalnis		Lapiai (kaimas)
Maciuičių piliakalnis	Pilalė	Maciuičiai
Pakalniškių piliakalnis	Gediminaičių piliakalnis, Pilė	Pakalniškiai (Klaipėda)
Šiuraičių piliakalnis	Mockaičių pilis	Mockaičiai (Klaipėda), Šiuraičiai (Klaipėda)
Norgėlų piliakalnis	Mataičių piliakalnis, Vytauto kalnas	Norgėlai (Klaipėda), Mataičiai
Skomantų piliakalnis	Ragokalnis, Raguva	Skomantai
Veiviržėnų piliakalnis	Vilkių piliakalnis	Veiviržėnai, Vilkiai
Vyskupiškių piliakalnis		Vyskupiškiai
Žvaginių piliakalnis	Žadeikių piliakalnis, Žvaginių kapai	Žvaginiai

== Kretinga District ==
Name	Other names	Location(s)
Andulių piliakalnis	Ėgliškių piliakalnis, Švedkalnis	Anduliai, Ėgliškiai (Kretinga)
Auksūdžio piliakalnis	Kūlių pilė, Pilalė, Švedų pilalė	Auksūdys (Kretinga)
Dauginčių piliakalnis	Pilis, Pilalė	Dauginčiai
Dauginčių II piliakalnis	Pilalė, Mėnulio kalnas	Dauginčiai
Dvarčininkų piliakalnis		Dvarčininkai (Kretinga)
Gaudučių piliakalnis	Pilalė	Gaudučiai (Kretinga)
Gintarų piliakalnis	Vyšniakalnis	Gintarai (Kretinga)
Imbarės piliakalnis	Pilalė	Imbarė
Joskaudų piliakalnis	Pilis, Alkos kalnas	Joskaudai
Kačaičių piliakalnis	Pilalė	Kačaičiai
Kalno Grikštų piliakalnis		Kalno Grikštai
Kalno Grikštų II piliakalnis		Kalno Grikštai
Kartenos piliakalnis	Pilis	Kartena
Kurmaičių piliakalnis	Pilalė	Kurmaičiai
Laivių piliakalnis	Erlėnų piliakalnis, Pilalė	Laiviai
Martynaičių piliakalnis		Martynaičiai
Mišučių piliakalnis	Nausodžio piliakalnis, Mongirdo pilalė	Mišučiai (Kretinga)
Nagarbos piliakalnis	Bliūdkalnis, Senkų piliakalnis	Negarba, Senkai (Kretinga)
Prystovų piliakalnis	Pilalė, Pilis, Dyburio pilis	Prystovai
Reketės piliakalnis	Pilalė	Reketė
Rūdaičių piliakalnis	Pilalė	Rūdaičiai
Sauserių piliakalnis	Pilalė	Sauseriai
Senosios Įpilties I piliakalnis	Įpilties piliakalnis	Senoji Įpiltis
Senosios Įpilties II piliakalnis	Karių kalnas, Margininkų piliakalnis	Senoji Įpiltis
Senosios Įpilties III piliakalnis	Marijos kalnelis	Senoji Įpiltis
Valėnų piliakalnis	Cartų piliakalnis, Pilalė	Valėnai
Vėlaičių piliakalnis		Vėlaičiai (Kretinga)

== Kupiškis District ==
Name	Other names	Location(s)
Aluotų piliakalnis	Druskių piliakalnis	Druskiai (Kupiškis)
Aukštupėnai hillfort; lt:Aukštupėnų piliakalnis	Kupiškio piliakalnis	Aukštupėnai, Kupiškis
Bakšėnų piliakalnis		Bakšėnai
Bugailiškių piliakalnis		Bugailiškiai
Elniškių piliakalnis	Elniškių kapinės	Elniškiai
Gaigalių piliakalnis		Gaigaliai (Kupiškis)
Kerelių piliakalnis		Kereliai (Kupiškis)
Likalaukių piliakalnis	Sipsalė, Astravų piliakalnis	Likalaukiai
Obonių piliakalnis	Zūbiškių piliakalnis	Obonys
Papilių piliakalnis	Pilis	Papiliai
Papilių II piliakalnis		Papiliai
Stirniškio piliakalnis	Skverbų piliakalnis, Palėvėnės piliakalnis	Stirniškiai (Kupiškis)
Vaduvų piliakalnis		Vaduvos

== Lazdijai District ==
Name	Other names	Location(s)
Buniškių piliakalnis		Buniškiai
Buteliūnų piliakalnis		Buteliūnai
Druskininkėlių piliakalnis	Saltoniškės piliakalnis	Druskininkėliai, Saltoniškė
Elveriškės piliakalnis	Eglynkalnis	Elveriškė
Ežerėlių piliakalnis		Ežerėliai
Giraitės piliakalnis		Giraitė (Lazdijai)
Krikštonių piliakalnis		Krikštonys
Kuklių piliakalnis		Kukliai
Maišymų piliakalnis	Gumbelių piliakalnis	Maišymai, Gumbeliai (Lazdijai)
Mėčiūnų piliakalnis		Mėčiūnai
Mikyčių piliakalnis		Mikyčiai
Paliūnų piliakalnis		Paliūnai
Papalazdijų piliakalnis	Lazdijų piliakalnis, Palazdijų piliakalnis, Katkuškių piliakalnis	Papalazdijai
Paserninkų piliakalnis	Eglynkalnis	Paserninkai
Paveisininkų piliakalnis		Paveisininkai
Prelomčiškės piliakalnis	Eglynų piliakalnis	Prelomčiškė
Rudaminos piliakalnis		Rudamina
Šlavantų piliakalnis		Šlavantai
Ūdininkų piliakalnis		Ūdininkai
Vainiūnų piliakalnis		Vainiūnai
Verstaminų I piliakalnis		Verstaminai
Verstaminų II piliakalnis		Verstaminai
Verstaminų III piliakalnis		Verstaminai
Verstaminų IV piliakalnis	Koplyčkalnis	Verstaminai

== Marijampolė Municipality ==
Name	Other names	Location(s)
Būriškių piliakalnis		Būriškiai
Kumelionių piliakalnis	Marijampolės II piliakalnis	Kumelionys
Lakinskų piliakalnis		Lakinskai
Liudvinavo piliakalnis	Lapkalnis, Lapiakalnis	Liudvinavas
Meškučių piliakalnis	Marijampolės piliakalnis	Meškučiai
Meškučių II piliakalnis	Marijampolės II piliakalnis, Marcinkalnis	Meškučiai
Padovinio piliakalnis		Padovinys
Piliakalnių piliakalnis		Piliakalniai (Marijampolė)
Riečių piliakalnis	Gaulės kalnas	Riečiai
Šakališkių piliakalnis		Šakališkiai (Marijampolė)
Tarašiškių piliakalnis		Tarašiškiai
Varnupių piliakalnis	Kirvakalnis	Varnupiai

== Mažeikiai District ==
Name	Other names	Location(s)
Dapšių piliakalnis	Alkos kalnas, Alkakalnis	Dapšiai
Daubariai Hillfort		Daubariai
Daubarių II piliakalnis		Daubariai
Gyvolių piliakalnis	Švedkalnis	Gyvoliai
Griežės piliakalnis		Griežė
Griežės II piliakalnis		Griežė
Jautakių piliakalnis	Pilalė, Pilies kalnas	Jautakiai
Leckavos piliakalnis		Leckava
Mantvydų piliakalnis	Pilalė	Mantvydai (Mažeikiai)
Renavo piliakalnis	Pilalė	Renavas
Rimolių piliakalnis	Kulšėnų piliakalnis, Užpilis	Rimoliai
Ritinės piliakalnis	Švedkapis	Ritinė
Sedos piliakalnis	Pilalė	Seda
Vadagių piliakalnis	Pilalės kalnas, Švedkalnis	Vadagiai

== Molėtai District ==
Name	Other names	Location(s)
Alantos piliakalnis	Pakalnės piliakalnis	Alanta
Ambraziškių piliakalnis	Pušalotų piliakalnis, Račiškių piliakalnis	Ambraziškiai
Antakščių piliakalnis	Aukštakalnis	Antakščiai
Antakščių II piliakalnis	Pyliakalnis	Antakščiai
Antaraisčių piliakalnis	Rateliakalnis	Antaraisčiai
Avilčių piliakalnis		Avilčiai
Bendžiukų piliakalnis		Bendžiukai
Čiulėnų piliakalnis	Juodasis kalnas	Čiulėnai
Didžiokų piliakalnis	Šideikių piliakalnis, Švedkalnis	Didžiokai
Dubingių piliakalnis	Pilies kalnas	Dubingiai
Gaigalų piliakalnis		Gaigalai (Molėtai)
Janonių piliakalnis	Pilalė	Janonys (Molėtai)
Jasiuliškių piliakalnis	Švedkalnis	Jasiuliškiai (Molėtai)
Jonėnų piliakalnis		Jonėnai
Kamastos piliakalnis	Švedkalnis, Bubka	Kamasta
Kampų piliakalnis	Jūrkampio piliakalnis	Kampai
Karališkių piliakalnis		Karališkės (Molėtai)
Kertuojos piliakalnis		Kertuoja
Klabinių piliakalnis	Kučiuškė piliakalnis	Klabiniai
Kulionių piliakalnis		Kulionys
Liesėnų piliakalnis	Bendrių piliakalnis, Videniškių piliakalnis	Liesėnai
Maišiakulės piliakalnis		Maišiakulė
Malkėsto piliakalnis	Janiškio piliakalnis	Malkėstas
Pakryžės piliakalnis	Aluntėlės kalnas	Pakryžė
Paraudinės piliakalnis		Paraudinė
Pavandenės piliakalnis	Aukštakalnis	Pavandenė (Molėtai)
Pazadvorijos piliakalnis	Padvario piliakalnis, Zomkus	Padvarys
Pelenių piliakalnis		Peleniai (Molėtai)
Perkalių piliakalnis	Smailiakalnis, Trakas	Perkaliai
Piliakalnio piliakalnis (Molėtai)	Antakščių III piliakalnis	Gaidamoniai
Piliakiemių piliakalnis		Piliakiemiai
Runionių piliakalnis	Pilies kalnas	Runionys
Sližiškių piliakalnis	Juodasai kalnelis	Sližiškiai
Suginčių piliakalnis		Suginčiai
Svobiškėlio piliakalnis	Skritkalnis	Svobiškėlis
Vališkių piliakalnis		Vališkiai (Molėtai)
Vorėnų piliakalnis		Vorėnai
Želvų piliakalnis	Kaukuras, Kapusčiaragis	Želvos (kaimas)

== Pagėgiai Municipality ==
Name	Other names	Location(s)
Birštoniškių piliakalnis	Būbliškės piliakalnis, Pagėgių piliakalnis	Pagėgiai, Būbliškė
Kreivėnų piliakalnis	Kulmenų piliakalnis, Pilės kalnas, Užkulnių piliakalnis	Kulmenai
Opstainių I piliakalnis	Vilkyškių piliakalnis, Opstainio I piliakalnis	Opstainys
Opstainių II piliakalnis	Opstė, Opstainio II piliakalnis	Opstainys
Rambyno kalnas	Rambyno piliakalnis	Bitėnai
Šereitlaukio I piliakalnis		Šereitlaukis
Šereitlaukio II piliakalnis	Milžinkapis	Šereitlaukis
Vartūliškių piliakalnis	Šventkalnis, Šventkapis	Vartūliškiai

== Pakruojis District ==
Name	Other names	Location(s)
Peleniškių piliakalnis	Kalnuočių piliakalnis	Peleniškiai
Tričių piliakalnis		Tričiai
Žeimelio piliakalnis	Žydkapis	Žeimelis

== Palanga ==
Name	Other names	Location(s)
Palangos piliakalnis	Birutės kalnas	Palanga

== Panevėžys District ==
Name	Other names	Location(s)
Baimainių piliakalnis	Vilkų piliakalnis	Baimainiai, Vilkai (Panevėžys)
Kiūčių piliakalnis	Minakalnis, Senkapis	Kiūčiai
Papušių piliakalnis		Papušiai
Upytės piliakalnis	Tarnagalos piliakalnis, Čičinsko kalnas	Upytė, Tarnagala

== Pasvalys District ==
Name	Other names	Location(s)
Ąžuolpamūšė hillfort; lt:Ąžuolpamūšės piliakalnis	Dabužių piliakalnis	Ąžuolpamūšė
Migonių piliakalnis	Šimonių piliakalnis, Paberžių piliakalnis, Sindriūnų piliakalnis	Migoniai, Šimoniai
Moliūnų piliakalnis	Kriklinių piliakalnis, Karališkoji pilis	Krikliniai, Moliūnai
Saudogalos piliakalnis		Saudogala

== Plungė District ==
Name	Other names	Location(s)
Abokų piliakalnis		Abokai
Alsėdžių piliakalnis	Žvėrinčius	Alsėdžiai
Gandinga hillfort	Pilies kalnas	Gandinga
Gandinga II hillfort	Nausodžio II piliakalnis, Ožkupris	Gandinga
Gegrėnų piliakalnis		Gegrėnai
Gegrėnų II piliakalnis	Pelekalnis	Gegrėnai
Gelindėnų piliakalnis		Gelindėnai
Gintališkės hillfort	Pilė	Gintališkė
Girkantų piliakalnis	Jazdauskiškių piliakalnis, Pilalė	Girkantai
Grigaičių piliakalnis	Pilalė	Grigaičiai (Plungė)
Kepurėnų piliakalnis		Kepurėnai
Lekemės piliakalnis	Lapinsko kalnas	Lekemė
Lieplaukalės piliakalnis	Lieplaukės piliakalnis, Pilalė	Lieplaukalė
Medsėdžių piliakalnis		Medsėdžiai (Plungė)
Nausodžio piliakalnis	Pilalė, Apiera	Varkaliai, Nausodis (Plungė)
Nugarių piliakalnis	Pilalė	Nugariai
Pakutuvėnų piliakalnis	Pilalė	Pakutuvėnai
Plungės piliakalnis	Pilalė	Plungė
Plungės II piliakalnis	Pilalė	Plungė
Pūčkorių I piliakalnis	Pilė	Pūčkoriai
Pūčkorių II piliakalnis	Pilies kalnas	Pūčkoriai
Pūčkorių III piliakalnis	Pilė	Pūčkoriai
Rotinėnų piliakalnis	Pilalė, Juodkalnis	Rotinėnai
Stalgėnų piliakalnis		Stalgėnai
Stanelių piliakalnis	Senpilis	Staneliai
Stirbaičių piliakalnis	Pilalė	Stirbaičiai (Plungė)
Surblių piliakalnis	Jodėnų piliakalnis, Pilis	Surbliai
Šarnelės piliakalnis	Švedkalnis	Šarnelė
Užpelkių piliakalnis	Pilalė	Užpelkiai (Plungė)
Varkalių piliakalnis		Varkaliai
Varkalių II piliakalnis		Varkaliai
Vieštovėnų piliakalnis		Vieštovėnai
Žemaičių Kalvarijos piliakalnis	Varduvos piliakalnis, Gardų piliakalnis, Šv.Jono kalnas	Žemaičių Kalvarija
Žernių piliakalnis		Žerniai

== Prienai District ==
Name	Other names	Location(s)
Bačkininkėlių piliakalnis		Bačkininkėliai
Gerulių piliakalnis		Geruliai
Kieliško piliakalnis		Kieliškas
Klebiškio piliakalnis	Pakiauliškio piliakalnis	Klebiškis
Lepelionių piliakalnis	Balnakalnis, Napoleono Kepurė, Krištapiškių piliakalnis	Lepelionys
Mačiūnų piliakalnis	Prienų piliakalnis	Mačiūnai
Medžionių piliakalnis		Medžionys
Naravų piliakalnis		Naravai
Naujasodžio piliakalnis		Naujasodis (Prienai)
Naujasodžio II piliakalnis		Naujasodis (Prienai)
Noreikiškių piliakalnis	Guzelis	Noreikiškės (Prienai)
Noreikiškių II piliakalnis	Guzelis	Noreikiškės (Prienai)
Norkūnų piliakalnis		Norkūnai (Prienai)
Norkūnų II piliakalnis		Norkūnai (Prienai)
Pabrasčių piliakalnis		Pabrasčiai
Pačiudiškių piliakalnis	Čiudiškių piliakalnis	Pačiudiškiai
Pagaršvio piliakalnis		Pagaršvys
Pašlavančio piliakalnis		Pašlavantys
Pašventupio piliakalnis	Vangų piliakalnis	Pašventupys (Prienai)
Pašventupio II piliakalnis		Pašventupys (Prienai)
Paukščių piliakalnis	Bobų kalnas, Paukščių kalnas, Dukurnonių piliakalnis, Steponiškių piliakalnis, Vilkų piliakalnis	Steponiškės (Prienai)
Pelekonių I piliakalnis		Pelekonys
Pelekonių II piliakalnis	Pilikė	Pelekonys
Pelekonių III piliakalnis	Pilalė	Pelekonys
Pelekonių IV piliakalnis	Pilalė, Dambavos piliakalnis	Pelekonys
See Pieštvė; lt:Pieštuvėnų piliakalnis	Didysis kalnas	Pieštuvėnai
Pelekonių piliakalnis	Pilelė	Pelekonys
Prienlaukio piliakalnis		Prienlaukys
Sabalėnų piliakalnis	Sabakalnis	Sabalėnai
Stakliškių I piliakalnis	Piliakalnio piliakalnis	Stakliškės
Stakliškių II piliakalnis		Stakliškės
Vilkininkų piliakalnis	Karkliniškių piliakalnis	Vilkininkai (Prienai)
Virkininkų piliakalnis		Virkininkai
Voseliūnų piliakalnis	Paverknių II piliakalnis, Baltas kalnas	Voseliūnai (Prienai)
Žarijų I piliakalnis	Bagrėno I piliakalnis	Žarijos, Bagrėnas
Žarijų II piliakalnis	Bagrėno II piliakalnis	Žarijos, Bagrėnas

== Radviliškis District ==
Name	Other names	Location(s)
Diauderių piliakalnis	Baisogalos piliakalnis	Diauderiai
Jankaičių piliakalnis		Jankaičiai (Radviliškis)
Kudinų piliakalnis	Šiaulės kalnas, Kalnų piliakalnis, Šialėnų piliakalnis	Kudinai, Kalnai (Radviliškis)
Pakalniškių piliakalnis	Kleboniškių piliakalnis, Piliakalnio piliakalnis	Pakalniškiai
Pašakarnio piliakalnis	Pilė	Pašakarnis
Raginėnų piliakalnis	Raganų kalnas	Raginėnai
Ramulėnų piliakalnis	Ramyla	Ramulėnai
Vaitiekūnų piliakalnis	Pilius	Vaitiekūnai
Velžių piliakalnis		Velžiai (Radviliškis)

== Raseiniai District ==
Name	Other names	Location(s)
Bažavalės piliakalnis	Barsukalnis	Bažavalė
Betygalos I piliakalnis		Betygala
Betygalos II piliakalnis		Betygala
Darbutų I piliakalnis	Bielsko kalnas	Darbutai
Darbutų II piliakalnis		Darbutai
Daugėliškių piliakalnis	Ožnugaris	Daugėliškiai (Raseiniai)
Gabrieliškių piliakalnis	Naukaimio piliakalnis, Vištkalnis	Naukaimis (Raseiniai)
Galkaičių piliakalnis	Gručkalnis	Galkaičiai
Gėluvos piliakalnis	Birutkalnis	Gėluva
Ginaičių piliakalnis	Kalniškių piliakalnis	Kalniškiai I (Raseiniai)
Ižiniškių piliakalnis	Papilė	Ižiniškiai
Kalnujų piliakalnis	Palendrių piliakalnis, Jovaišių piliakalnis, Žieveliškės piliakalnis	Palendriai (Raseiniai)
Kejėnų piliakalnis	Kaukuras, Švedų bokštas	Kejėnai
Lyduvėnų I piliakalnis	Danutės kalnas	Lyduvėnai
Lyduvėnų II piliakalnis	Barsukalnis	Lyduvėnai
Lyduvėnų III piliakalnis	Kaukuris	Lyduvėnai
Mankūnų piliakalnis		Mankūnai (Raseiniai)
Molavėnų I piliakalnis	Kauprės, Griaužų piliakalnis	Molavėnai, Griaužai (Raseiniai)
Molavėnų II piliakalnis		Molavėnai
Pabalčių piliakalnis	Milžavėnų piliakalnis	Pabalčiai
Padubysio piliakalnis	Kaukuras, Kaimelės piliakalnis	Padubysys
Pužų piliakalnis	Pilalė	Pužai
Raseinių piliakalnis	Prabauda, Cibikalnis, Mirklių piliakalnis	Raseiniai
Ročiškės piliakalnis	Račkiškės piliakalnis	Ročiškė
Šiaulelių piliakalnis	Pilalė	Šiauleliai
Zvėgių piliakalnis	Pilies kalnas	Zvėgiai

== Rietavas Municipality ==
Name	Other names	Location(s)
Lopaičių piliakalnis	Tverų piliakalnis, Leibiškės piliakalnis	Lopaičiai
Medingėnų piliakalnis		Medingėnai
Pauškių piliakalnis	Kačių piliakalnis, Pilalė	Pauškės
Skaborų piliakalnis		Skaborai
Skroblio piliakalnis		Skroblis
Šiuraičių piliakalnis	Švedkalnis	Šiuraičiai (Rietavas)
Šiuraičių II piliakalnis		Šiuraičiai (Rietavas)

== Rokiškis District ==
Name	Other names	Location(s)
Alksnių piliakalnis	Onuškio piliakalnis	Alksniai
Alsetos piliakalnis	Koplyčkalnis	Alseta
Ažušilių piliakalnis		Ažušiliai (Rokiškis)
Baušiškių piliakalnis	Bogušiškių piliakalnis, Radiščių piliakalnis, Kubiliškių piliakalnis	Baušiškės
Bradesių piliakalnis		Bradesiai
Bryzgių piliakalnis		Bryzgiai
Dauliūnų piliakalnis	Ožnugaris	Dauliūnai
Dirdų piliakalnis		Dirdos
Grubų piliakalnis		Grubos (Rokiškis)
Gudiškių piliakalnis	Čedasų piliakalnis, Daličių piliakalnis	Čedasai
Junkūnų piliakalnis	Kraštų piliakalnis	Junkūnai
Junkūnų II piliakalnis		Junkūnai
Juodonių piliakalnis	Pečianykas	Juodonys (Rokiškis)
Kalnočių piliakalnis		Kalnočiai
Kraštų piliakalnis		Kraštai (Juodupė)
Lukštų piliakalnis		Lukštai
Martiniškėnų piliakalnis	Martyniškių piliakalnis, Žydkapiai	Martiniškėnai
Mičiūnų piliakalnis		Mičiūnai
Mielėnų piliakalnis	Bajorų piliakalnis, Piliakalnio piliakalnis	Mielėnai
Moškėnų piliakalnis	Laukupėnų piliakalnis	Moškėnai, Laukupėnai
Papilių piliakalnis		Papiliai (Rokiškis)
Petrešiūnų piliakalnis		Petrešiūnai
Radžionių piliakalnis		Radžionys
Rudžių piliakalnis	Smailakalnis	Rudžiai (Rokiškis)
Sidabrinės piliakalnis	Valiūniškio piliakalnis	Sidabrinė (Rokiškis)
Stasiūnų piliakalnis		Stasiūnai (Rokiškis)
Užubalių piliakalnis	Kartuvių kalnas	Užubaliai (Rokiškis)
Veselavos piliakalnis		Veselava (Obeliai)

== Skuodas District ==
Name	Other names	Location(s)
Apuolė hillfort; lt:Apuolės piliakalnis		Apuolė
Erslos piliakalnis	Pilalė	Ersla
Girdenių piliakalnis		Girdeniai
Jedžiotų piliakalnis	Pilalė	Jedžiotai
Kalvių piliakalnis (Lenkimai)	Pilalė	Kalviai (Skuodas)
Kivylių piliakalnis	Pilalė	Kivyliai (Skuodas)
Kubiliškės piliakalnis	Kulų piliakalnis	Kubiliškė (Skuodas)
Mikytų piliakalnis	Pilis	Mikytai (Skuodas)
Mosėdžio piliakalnis		Mosėdis
Paparčių piliakalnis (Skuodas)	Aukštakalnis, Švedų kalnas	Paparčiai (Skuodas)
Puodkalių piliakalnis		Puodkaliai
Šakalių piliakalnis	Daukšių piliakalnis, Pilė	Daukšiai (Skuodas)
Užluobės piliakalnis	Šarkės piliakalnis, Pilė	Užluobė, Šarkė
Veitelių piliakalnis	Pilalė	Veiteliai

== Šakiai District ==
Name	Other names	Location(s)
Burgaičių I piliakalnis	Vorpilis	Burgaičiai, Sudargas
Burgaičių II piliakalnis	Pilaitė	Burgaičiai, Sudargas
Burgaičių III piliakalnis		Burgaičiai, Sudargas
Dulinčiškių piliakalnis		Dulinčiškiai
Grinaičių I piliakalnis	Žydkapis	Sudargas
Grinaičių II piliakalnis	Balnakalnis	Sudargas
Joginiškių piliakalnis	Kalnas	Joginiškiai
Klepų piliakalnis		Klepai
Kubilių piliakalnis (Šakiai)		Kubiliai
Kukarskės piliakalnis		Kukarskė
Maštaičių piliakalnis	Narkūnų piliakalnis	Maštaičiai
Mikytų piliakalnis	Smailakalnis	Mikytai
Misiūnų piliakalnis		Misiūnai (Šakiai)
Plokščių piliakalnis	Vaiguviškių piliakalnis	Plokščiai, Vaiguviškiai (Šakiai)
Stulgių piliakalnis	Šančius, Prancūzkalnis	Stulgiai (Šakiai)
Šėtijų piliakalnis	Jundakalnis	Šėtijai
Šilvienų piliakalnis	Kubilių piliakalnis, Pilaitė	Šilvėnai
Turčinų piliakalnis	Ročkų piliakalnis	Turčinai
Viltrakių piliakalnis		Viltrakiai
Žemosios Panemunės piliakalnis		Žemoji Panemunė
Žemosios Panemunės piliakalnis II		Žemoji Panemunė
Žuklijų piliakalnis		Žuklijai (Šakiai)

== Šalčininkai District ==
Name	Other names	Location(s)
Bėčionių piliakalnis		Bėčionys (Šalčininkai)
Dainavėlės piliakalnis		Dainavėlė (Šalčininkai)
Eišiškių piliakalnis	Gornostajiškių piliakalnis	Eišiškės
Kiaulėkų piliakalnis	Pilalė	Kiaulėkai
Paūdronių piliakalnis	Pilies kalnas	Paūdronys
Kurmelionių piliakalnis	Pilelė	Kurmelionys
Sangėliškių piliakalnis		Sangėliškės
Tetervinų piliakalnis	Plikasis kalnas, Ūtos piliakalnis, Papiškių piliakalnis	Tetervinai (Šalčininkai)
Turgelių piliakalnis		Turgeliai
Valakavičių piliakalnis		Valakavičiai
Vilkiškių I piliakalnis		Vilkiškės (Turgeliai)
Vilkiškių II piliakalnis		Vilkiškės (Turgeliai)

== Šiauliai District ==
Name	Other names	Location(s)
Bubių piliakalnis	Pilalė, Bubių Pilė	Bubiai (Šiauliai)
Jurgaičių piliakalnis	Kryžių kalnas Domantų piliakalnis, Šventkalnis	Domantai (Šiauliai)
Kurtuvėnų piliakalnis	Kapa	Kurtuvėnai
Luponių piliakalnis	Perkūnkalnis, Raganų kalnas	Luponiai
Normančių piliakalnis	Bauskės pilis	Normančiai
Pilkalnio piliakalnis	Kubelių piliakalnis	Pilkalnis (Šiauliai)
Pageluvio I piliakalnis	Barsukyno I piliakalnis	Pageluvis
Pageluvio II piliakalnis	Barsukyno II piliakalnis	Pageluvis
Rekčių piliakalnis	Vinavos kalnas	Rekčiai
Romučių piliakalnis	Papalskių piliakalnis, Gojelis	Romučiai
Sauginių piliakalnis	Pilė, Jonelaičių piliakalnis	Sauginiai
Šilėnų piliakalnis		Šilėnai
Žuvininkų piliakalnis	Šiaulių piliakalnis, Salduvė	Žuvininkai

== Šilalė District ==
Name	Other names	Location(s)
Bilionių piliakalnis	Šventkalnis, Švedkalnis	Bilionys
Biržų Lauko piliakalnis	Pilalė	Biržų Laukas
Burbiškių I piliakalnis	Pilies kalnas,	Burbiškiai (Šilalė)
Burbiškių II piliakalnis	Parškalnis	Burbiškiai (Šilalė)
Burbiškių III piliakalnis	Sargakalnis	Burbiškiai (Šilalė)
Dapkiškės piliakalnis	Pilė	Dapkiškė
Dungeriukų piliakalnis	Zamėkalnis	Dungeriukai
Gardiškės piliakalnis	Jaunodavos piliakalnis, Piliakalnio piliakalnis, Pilė	Gardiškė
Gedminiškės I piliakalnis	Trakas	Gedminiškė
Gedminiškės II piliakalnis	Trakas	Gedminiškė
Gegužių piliakalnis	Gegužkalnis, Bliūdakalnis, Galvyčių piliakalnis, Gegužės piliakalnis, Bliūdkalnis	Gegužės
Gūvainių piliakalnis		Gūvainiai
Indijos piliakalnis	Pilė	Indija (Šilalė)
Kalvalių piliakalnis	Miegė, Požerės piliakalnis	Kalvaliai
Kazokų piliakalnis	Užpilis	Kazokai (Šilalė)
Kiaukų piliakalnis		Kiaukai
Kreivių piliakalnis	Pilė	Kreiviai (Šilalė)
Kunigiškių piliakalnis	Lileikėnų piliakalnis, Švedkalnis, Jomantų pilė	Lileikėnai, Kunigiškiai (Šilalė)
Leviškių piliakalnis		Leviškiai
Medvėgalio piliakalnis	Karūžiškės piliakalnis	Karūžiškė
Padievaičio piliakalnis	Kvėdarnos piliakalnis	Padievaitis, Kvėdarna
Padievyčio piliakalnis	Pilė	Padievytis
Pagrybio piliakalnis	Skuburlė, Skuburkalnis	Pagrybis
Pakisio piliakalnis	Pilikė, Pajūrio piliakalnis	Pakisys, Pajūris (Šilalė)
Pasausalio piliakalnis		Pasausalis
Pavėžio piliakalnis	Drobūkščių piliakalnis	Drobūkščiai
Pilių piliakalnis	Kepaluškalnis, Kaltinėnų piliakalnis	Pilės
Prienų piliakalnis	Birgkalnis	Prienai (Šilalė)
Rubaičių piliakalnis	Pilalė	Rubaičiai
Rubinavo piliakalnis	Pilalė, Šarūnkalnis, Švedų pilė	Rubinavas
Simėnų piliakalnis	Kalniškių piliakalnis, Pelėdkalnis, Ivankių piliakalnis, Keterų piliakalnis, Aukuras	Simėnai, Kalniškiai
Treigių piliakalnis	Treigių pilė, Eržilkalnis, Kaštaunalių piliakalnis, Sarviečių piliakalnis	Treigiai
Vaičių piliakalnis	Pilalė, Švedkalnis	Vaičiai
Vedrių piliakalnis		Vedriai
Vilkų Lauko piliakalnis	Kūplė	Vilkų Laukas
Vilkų Lauko II piliakalnis	Spraudaičių piliakalnis, Veringa	Spraudaičiai, Vilkų Laukas

== Šilutė District ==
Name	Other names	Location(s)
Akmeniškių piliakalnis	Pilies kalnas, Margpilis, Švedkalnis	Akmeniškiai
Akmeniškių II piliakalnis		Akmeniškiai
Aukštumalų piliakalnis		Aukštumalai
Eidaičių piliakalnis	Pilalė	Eidaičiai
Gedikų piliakalnis		Gedikai
Jomantų piliakalnis	Jurgaičių pilalė	Jurgaičiai (Šilutė)
Juodžių piliakalnis	Pilalės kalnas, Šeputaičių piliakalnis	Juodžiai (Šilutė), Šeputaičiai
Kintų piliakalnis		Kintai
Lazduonėnų piliakalnis	Pilalė	Lazduonėnai
Lekių piliakalnis	Pilalė	Lekiai
Paulaičių piliakalnis	Pilalė	Paulaičiai
Pavilnučio piliakalnis	Sklepkalnis, Palendrupio piliakalnis	Pavilnutis
Sakūtėlių piliakalnis	Raganų kalnas, Čiūtelių piliakalnis	Sakūtėliai
Stankaičių piliakalnis	Pabūtkalnis	Stankaičiai (Šilutė)
Šiūparių piliakalnis		Šiūpariai (Šilutė)
Uoksų piliakalnis	Gailaičių piliakalnis, Mataičių piliakalnis, Šarkiškių piliakalnis	Gailaičiai (Šilutė), Uoksai (Šilutė)
Vanagių piliakalnis	Žemaičių Naumiesčio piliakalnis, Žaliakalnis	Žemaičių Naumiestis
Venckų piliakalnis		Venckai (Šilutė)
Žakainių piliakalnis	Laukstėnų piliakalnis, Užtenenio piliakalnis, Jokūbiškės piliakalnis	Žakainiai, Laukstėnai

== Širvintos District ==
Name	Other names	Location(s)
Dainių piliakalnis		Dainiai
Grebliaučiznos piliakalnis	Barsukynė	Grebliaučizna
Janionių piliakalnis	Pykuoliakalnis, Pikuolio kalnas	Janionys (Širvintos)
Kernavės I piliakalnis	Aukuro kalnas, Barsčių piliakalnis, Šventakalnis	Kernavė
Kernavės II piliakalnis	Mindaugos sostas	Kernavė
Kernavės III piliakalnis	Lizdeikos kalnas, Kriveikiškio kalnas, Smailiakalnis	Kernavė
Kernavės IV piliakalnis	Pilies kalnas, Įgulos kalnas	Kernavė
Kiauklių piliakalnis	Apskritas kalnas	Kiaukliai
Kriveikiškio piliakalnis	Žvalgakalnis, Kernavės V piliakalnis	Kriveikiškis
Laužiškio piliakalnis	Užburtas kalnas	Laužiškis
Mančiušėnų piliakalnis		Mančiušėnai
Mantinionių piliakalnis		Mantinionys
Maskoliškių piliakalnis	Batarėja	Maskoliškiai
Pasodninkų piliakalnis	Batarėja, Batareika	Pasodninkai
Raudonkos piliakalnis	Batarėja	Raudonka
Sadūniškių piliakalnis		Sadūniškės
Totoriškio piliakalnis		Totoriškis (Širvintos)

== Švenčionys District ==
Name	Other names	Location(s)
Abejučių piliakalnis		Abejučiai
Adutiškio piliakalnis	Viduožnugaris	Adutiškis
Akvieriškės piliakalnis		Akvieriškė
Aučynų piliakalnis		Aučynos
Baliulių piliakalnis		Baliuliai
Baluošos piliakalnis		Baluoša (Švenčionys)
Bogutiškės piliakalnis		Bogutiškė
Brižių I piliakalnis	Noselėnų II piliakalnis	Brižiai (Švenčionys)
Brižių II piliakalnis	Noselėnų III piliakalnis	Brižiai (Švenčionys)
Budrių piliakalnis	Pilalė	Budriai (Švenčionys)
Cegelnės piliakalnis		Cegelnė
Cirkliškio piliakalnis	Švenčionių piliakalnis, Perkūno kalnas	Cirkliškis
Daukšių piliakalnis	Papilių kalnas	Daukšiai (Švenčionys)
Jaciūnų piliakalnis		Jaciūnai
Kačėniškės piliakalnis		Kačėniškė
Kavalčiukų piliakalnis		Kavalčiukai (Švenčionys)
Lalučių piliakalnis		Lalučiai
Mikštų piliakalnis	Cegelnės piliakalnis, Auksinis kalnas	Mikštai
Stūglių piliakalnis	Piliakalnis	Stūgliai (Švenčionys)
Nevieriškės piliakalnis	Ponų kalnelis	Nevieriškė
Noselėnų piliakalnis		Noselėnai
Paduobės piliakalnis	Šaltaliūnės piliakalnis	Švenčionėliai
Pagilūtės piliakalnis		Pagilūtė
Prienų piliakalnis	Veršupka	Prienai (Švenčionys)
Ragaučinos piliakalnis		Ragaučina
Rakštelių piliakalnis		Rakšteliai
Reškutėnų piliakalnis	Liepkalnis	Reškutėnai
Rusališkės piliakalnis		Rusališkė
Stajėtiškio piliakalnis		Stajėtiškis
Stūglių piliakalnis	Piliakalnio piliakalnis	Stūgliai
Žąsinų piliakalnis		Žąsinai

== Tauragė District ==
Name	Other names	Location(s)
Aukštupių piliakalnis	Gaidvingis	Aukštupiai
Batakių piliakalnis	Pilutė, Švedkalnis	Batakiai
Dapkiškių piliakalnis	Pilaitė	Dapkiškiai
Gilandžių piliakalnis	Šventkalnis, Oplankio piliakalnis	Oplankys
Greižėnų piliakalnis	Oplankio piliakalnis	Oplankys, Greižėnai
Ivangėnų I piliakalnis	Pilikė	Ivangėnai, Karšuva (kaimas)
Ivangėnų II piliakalnis	Pilikė	Ivangėnai, Karšuva (kaimas)
Juškaičių piliakalnis	Pilutė	Juškaičiai (Tauragė)
Kalniškių piliakalnis (Tauragė)	Simėnų piliakalnis, Pilaitė, Papilys	Kalniškiai (Tauragė)
Kiukiškių piliakalnis	Pilaitė	Gaurė
Matiškių piliakalnis	Pilaitė	Matiškiai
Naujininkų piliakalnis	Kuturių piliakalnis, Pilalė	Naujininkai (Tauragė), Pagramantis
Nosaičių piliakalnis	Papiliakalnio piliakalnis	Nosaičiai, Skaudvilė
Pagramančio piliakalnis	Pilaitė	Pagramantis
Reksčių piliakalnis	Maskolkapis	Reksčiai (Tauragė)
Rekstukų piliakalnis	Kaukurinė, Maskolkapis	Rekstukai

== Telšiai District ==
Name	Other names	Location(s)
Biržuvėnų piliakalnis	Koplyčkalnis	Biržuvėnai
Buišų piliakalnis	Saulės kalnas, Tauragėnų piliakalnis	Buišai
Buožėnų piliakalnis	Pilalė	Buožėnai
Didžiųjų Burbiškių piliakalnis	Moteraitis, Burbiškių kalnas	Pavandenė
Džiuginėnų piliakalnis	Džiugo kalnas	Džiuginėnai
Eidžiotų piliakalnis	Pilalė, Liepkalnis	Eidžiotai
Getautės piliakalnis	Kungių piliakalnis	Kungiai (Telšiai)
Girgždūtės piliakalnis	Pagirgždūčio piliakalnis	Pagirgždūtis
Janapolės piliakalnis	Širmės kalnas	Janapolė
Kalnėnų piliakalnis	Marės kalnas	Telšiai
Lauko Sodos piliakalnis		Lauko Soda
Miksodžio piliakalnis	Knabė	Miksodis
Pagirgždūčio piliakalnis	Pilalė	Pagirgždūtis
Paplienijos piliakalnis	Žarėnų piliakalnis, Plinija	Paplienija
Sėbų piliakalnis	Pilalė	Sėbai
Skurvydiškės piliakalnis	Pilies kalnas	Degaičiai
Šatrija hillfort	Luokės piliakalnis, Pašatrijos piliakalnis	Luokė
Šaukštelio piliakalnis	Sprūdė, Pavandenės piliakalnis	Šaukštelis (Telšiai)
Vembūtų piliakalnis	Kulšiškių piliakalnis, Vydmantų piliakalnis	Vembūtai

== Trakai District ==
Name	Other names	Location(s)
Aukštadvario piliakalnis	Pilaitė	Aukštadvaris
Bagdononių piliakalnis		Bagdononys (Trakai)
Bražuolės piliakalnis		Bražuolė
Daniliškių piliakalnis	Totorių kalnas	Daniliškės (Trakai)
Grigiškių piliakalnis		Salos (Trakai)
Lavariškių piliakalnis	Napoleono Kepurė, Ugnies kalnas	Lavariškės
Mirgelių piliakalnis	Nupronių piliakalnis	Nupronys
Naravų piliakalnis		
Naujasodžių piliakalnis	Mošos piliakalnis, Kazokų kalnas	Naujasodžiai
Pamiškės piliakalnis	Aukštasis kalnas, Aukštakalnio piliakalnis, Piliakalnio piliakalnis	Pamiškė (Trakai)
Salų piliakalnis		Salos (Trakai)
Senieji Trakai Castle	Old Trakai Castle, Senųjų Trakų piliakalnis	Senieji Trakai
Stirnių piliakalnis		Stirniai (Trakai)
Strėvos piliakalnis		Strėva
Trakų piliakalnis	Pilies kalnas, Aukos kalnas	Trakai
Varnikų piliakalnis	Veršupka	Varnikai
Žuklijų I piliakalnis		Žuklijai (Trakai)
Žuklijų II piliakalnis	Piliakalniukas	Žuklijai (Trakai)

== Ukmergė District ==
Name	Other names	Location(s)
Antatilčių piliakalnis	Pilelė	Antatilčiai
Antatilčių II piliakalnis	Pilalė	Antatilčiai
Bartkūnų piliakalnis	Koplyčkalnis	Bartkūnai (Ukmergė)
Berzgainių piliakalnis		Berzgainiai
Daubariškių piliakalnis	Pažiemių piliakalnis	Daubariškiai (Ukmergė)
Juodausių piliakalnis		Juodausiai
Laičių piliakalnis	Plačiavos piliakalnis, Džiugasalis, Kaselio kalnas	Laičiai
Lelikonių piliakalnis		Lelikoniai
Lokinės piliakalnis	Kritkalnis	Lokinė
Pilionių piliakalnis	Mateikiškų piliakalnis, Majokas	Mateikiškiai, Pilionys
Parijos piliakalnis	Pavydžių piliakalnis, Lapiakalnis	Parija, Pavydžiai
Paželvių piliakalnis		Paželviai
Radiškio piliakalnis		Selkava
Saliečių piliakalnis		Saliečiai
Sližių piliakalnis	Papiliakalnis	Sližiai
Sukinių piliakalnis	Pilaitė	Sukiniai
Šinkūnų piliakalnis		Šinkūnai
Ukmergės piliakalnis		Ukmergė
Užušilių piliakalnis		Užušiliai (Ukmergė)
Vaitkuškio piliakalnis	Lapiakalnis	Vaitkuškis
Veprių piliakalnis		Vepriai
Zujų piliakalnis	Šantas	Zujai

== Utena District ==
Name	Other names	Location(s)
Aknystėlių piliakalnis		Aknystėlės
Andreikėnų piliakalnis	Juozapotos kalnas	Andreikėnai
Antabaltės piliakalnis		Antabaltė
Antalgės piliakalnis		Antalgė
Antilgės piliakalnis		Antilgė
Armališkių piliakalnis		Armališkės (Utena)
Artmaniškio piliakalnis		Artmaniškis
Bajoriškių piliakalnis		Bajoriškiai
Baltakarčių piliakalnis		Baltakarčiai
Bikūnų piliakalnis		Bikūnai (Utena)
Bikūnų II piliakalnis	Kapų kalnas	Bikūnai (Utena)
Brinkliškių piliakalnis		Brinkliškės
Daugailių I piliakalnis		Daugailiai
Daugailių II piliakalnis	Pylimas	Daugailiai
Degėsių piliakalnis	Lapkalnis	Degėsiai
Dryžių piliakalnis	Saldutiškio piliakalnis	Dryžiai
Gaigalių piliakalnis		Gaigaliai
Gailiešionių piliakalnis		Gailiešionys
Gaižiūnų piliakalnis	Ramybės kalnas	Gaižiūnai
Garnių I piliakalnis		Garniai (Utena)
Garnių II piliakalnis		Garniai (Utena)
Gatelių piliakalnis		Gateliai
Gimžiškių piliakalnis		Gimžiškiai
Jaurelio piliakalnis		Jaurelės
Jonaukos piliakalnis	Lukošiūnų piliakalnis	Lukošiūnai
Kačiūnų piliakalnis		Kačiūnai
Kalvių piliakalnis		Kalviai (Utena)
Kamšos piliakalnis	Barsukalnis	Kamša (Utena)
Klykių piliakalnis		Klykiai
Kubilių piliakalnis		Kubiliai (Utena)
Kuktiškių piliakalnis		Kuktiškės
Likančių piliakalnis		Likančiai (Utena)
Lygamiškio piliakalnis	Geniupio kalnas, Užpalių II piliakalnis	Lygamiškis
Maneičių piliakalnis		Maneičiai
Narkūnų piliakalnis	Utenio pilis	Narkūnai
Našloniškio piliakalnis	Vaikeso ežeros piliakalnis	Našloniškis
Nemeikščių piliakalnis		Nemeikščiai
Nolėnų piliakalnis		Nolėnai
Noliškio piliakalnis		Noliškis
Nuodėgulių piliakalnis	Gikiškio piliakalnis	Nuodėguliai
Pakalnių piliakalnis	Švedų baterija	Pakalniai
Papirčių piliakalnis	Kamšos piliakalnis, Dovydo kalnas, Barsukalnis, Piliakalnio piliakalnis	Papirčiai
Ruklių piliakalnis		Rukliai
Rukšėnų piliakalnis		Rukšėnai
Sėlos piliakalnis	Sėlės piliakalnis	Sėlė
Spitrėnų piliakalnis		Spitrėnai
Staniuliškių piliakalnis	Pilelė	Staniuliškės
Sūngailiškio piliakalnis		Sūngailiškis
Šeimaties piliakalnis	Batarėja	Šeimatis
Šeimyniškių piliakalnis	Pilies kalnas	Šeimyniškiai
Šiaudinių piliakalnis	Pilelė	Šiaudiniai
Šikšnių piliakalnis		Šikšniai (Utena)
Tauragnų piliakalnis	Majokas	Tauragnai
Tauragnų II piliakalnis		Tauragnai
Taurapilio piliakalnis		Taurapilis
Užpaliai hillfort	Pilies kalnas	Užpaliai
Ūdriškių piliakalnis	Piniginis kalnas, Urviškių piliakalnis, Vilkiškių piliakalnis	Urviškės
Vaikutėnų piliakalnis		Vaikutėnai
Vitkūnų piliakalnis		Vitkūnai (Utena)
Vosgėlių piliakalnis		Vosgėliai (Utena)
Žaibiškių piliakalnis		Žaibiškės

== Varėna District ==
Name	Other names	Location(s)
Barčių piliakalnis	Čepelūnų piliakalnis, Ulbinų piliakalnis	Barčiai (Varėna)
Butvydonių piliakalnis		Butvydonys
Dubičių piliakalnis	Karalienės Bonos pilis	Dubičiai
Dvarčių piliakalnis	Paraisčių piliakalnis	Dvarčiai
Girežerio piliakalnis		Varėna
Mikniūnų piliakalnis	Giraitės piliakalnis, Lesagūrų piliakalnis, Pilalė, Zomkakalnis	Giraitė, Mikniūnai (Varėna)
Kaniavėlės piliakalnis	Apykopas	Kaniavėlė
Krūminių piliakalnis	Norkūno pilis, Raganos pilis	Krūminiai
Liškiavos piliakalnis	Pilies kalnas	Liškiava
Merkinės piliakalnis		Merkinė
Radyščiaus piliakalnis		Radyščius
Voniškių piliakalnis	Burbonių piliakalnis, Burboniškių kalnai	Burbonys, Voniškės

== Vilkaviškis District ==
Name	Other names	Location(s)
Dabravolės piliakalnis		Dabravolė
Graužinių piliakalnis		Graužiniai (Vilkaviškis)
Kaupiškių piliakalnis		Kaupiškiai
Kudirkos Naumiesčio piliakalnis	Miestlaukio piliakalnis	Kudirkos Naumiestis
Kunigiškių piliakalnis	Pajevonio piliakalnis	Pajevonys
Misviečių piliakalnis	Pilis	Misviečiai
Pavištyčio I piliakalnis		Pavištytis
Pavištyčio II piliakalnis		Pavištytis
Piliakalnių piliakalnis		Piliakalniai
Piliūnų piliakalnis		Piliūnai
Pilviškių piliakalnis	Ragokalnis	Pilviškiai
Ragaišių piliakalnis	Aspertavo piliakalnis, Juodakalnis	Pajevonys
Rementiškių piliakalnis	Šapalų piliakalnis, Matarnų piliakalnis, Prancuzkapis	Rementiškiai
Šakių piliakalnis		Šakiai (Vilkaviškis)
Šukių piliakalnis	Juozapavo piliakalnis	Šukiai
Vartelių piliakalnis		Varteliai (Gražiškiai)
Virbalio piliakalnis	Virbalgirio piliakalnis	Virbalis
Vištyčio Lauko II piliakalnis		Vištytis (miestelis)

== Vilnius ==
Name	Other names	Location(s)
Didžiųjų Gulbinų piliakalnis		Vilnius
Gariūnų piliakalnis		Vilnius
Gudelių piliakalnis		Vilnius
Kairėnų piliakalnis	Dvarčionių piliakalnis	Kairėnai (Vilnius)
Naujosios Vilnios piliakalnis	Kučkuriškių piliakalnis, Barsukynė	Vilnius
Neravų piliakalnis		Vilnius
Panerių I piliakalnis	Jankiškių I piliakalnis	Vilnius
Panerių II piliakalnis	Jankiškių II piliakalnis	Vilnius
Pilaitės piliakalnis (Vilnius)	Piliavietė	Vilnius
Pūčkorių piliakalnis	Piliakalnis	Vilnius
Rokantiškių piliakalnis		Vilnius
Staviškių piliakalnis	Naujųjų Verkių piliakalnis	Vilnius
Vaidotų piliakalnis		Vilnius
Vilniaus I piliakalnis	Gediminas Hill (Gedimino kalnas), Castle Hill (Pilies kalnas), Piliavietė	Vilnius
Vilniaus II piliakalnis	Hill of Three Crosses(Trijų kryžių kalnas), Plikasis kalnas, Kreivasis kalnas	Vilnius
Vilniaus III piliakalnis	Stalo kalnas	Vilnius
Vilniaus IV piliakalnis	Bekešo kalnas	Vilnius
Vilniaus V piliakalnis	Gedimino kapas	Vilnius

== Vilnius District ==
Name	Other names	Location(s)
Avižienių piliakalnis	Prancūzkapis	Avižieniai (Vilnius)
Batarėja	Mažosios Riešės piliakalnis	Mažoji Riešė
Bernotų piliakalnis		Bernotai (Vilnius)
Bielazariškių piliakalnis	Pilies kalnas	Bielazariškės
Bradeliškės hillfort	Pakilta, Buivydų piliakalnis	Bradeliškės
Buivydų piliakalnis	Bradeliškių piliakalnis	Buivydai (Vilnius)
Buivydų II piliakalnis	Vėjo kalnas	Buivydai (Vilnius)
Danilavos piliakalnis		Danilava
Didžiosios Kuosinės piliakalnis	Pilaitė	Didžioji Kuosinė
Elniakampio piliakalnis	Velniakampio piliakalnis, Geležių piliakalnis	Elniakampis, Geležiai
Gaukeliškių piliakalnis		Gaukeliškės
Gegužinės piliakalnis		Gegužinė (Rudamina)
Karmazinai hillfort; lt:Karmazinų piliakalnis	Viršupis	Karmazinai
Lavoriškių piliakalnis		Lavoriškės
Leoniškių piliakalnis	Pilies kalnas	Leoniškės
Maišiagalos piliakalnis	Bonos pilis	Maišiagala
Mažosios Riešės piliakalnis	Batarėja	Mažoji Riešė
Mūrininkų piliakalnis	Rūkainių piliakalnis, Mūrinės piliakalnis	Mūrininkai
Naujosios Rėvos piliakalnis		Naujoji Rėva
Nemenčinės piliakalnis	Piliakalnis	Nemenčinė
Papiškių piliakalnis	Rudaminos piliakalnis	Rudamina (Vilnius)
Pašulniškių piliakalnis		Pašulniškės
Pikutiškių piliakalnis	Švedų piliakalnis	Pikutiškės
Rėvos piliakalnis	Ponų kalnas, Santakos piliakalnis	Rėva
Santakos piliakalnis		Santaka
Smiglių piliakalnis	Pasienių piliakalnis	Smigliai
Sužionių piliakalnis	Kalvinų kalnas	Sužionys
Uosininkų piliakalnis	Pilies kalnas	Uosininkai III
Veršiobalio piliakalnis	Kiemelių	Veršiobalis
Vilkeliškių piliakalnis	Apvalus kalnas	Vilkeliškės

== Visaginas Municipality ==
Name	Other names	Location(s)
Čeberakų piliakalnis	Pasamanės piliakalnis, Bažnyčiakalnis	Visaginas
Petriškės piliakalnis		Visaginas

== Zarasai District ==
Name	Other names	Location(s)
Antaniškių piliakalnis	Juodasis kalnas	Antaniškės
Antažiegės piliakalnis		Antažiegė
Asavytų piliakalnis		Asavytai
Avilių piliakalnis		Aviliai
Avižių piliakalnis		Avižiai
Betiškių piliakalnis		Betiškės
Bielkaučiznos piliakalnis	Batarėja	Bielkaučizna
Degučių piliakalnis	Ažusamanės pilis	Degučiai (Zarasai)
Galminių piliakalnis		Galminiai
Gasių piliakalnis	Piniginis kalnas, Šaikinės piliakalnis	Gasiai
Golubiškių piliakalnis	Ažuraisčių piliakalnis	Ažuraisčiai
Gugių piliakalnis		Gugiai
Gutaučių piliakalnis	Valeikų piliakalnis, Pilaitė	Gutaučiai
Ivoniškių piliakalnis		Ivoniškės
Jakiškių piliakalnis		Jakiškiai (Zarasai)
Jatkūniškių piliakalnis	Kiaušinėlis	Jatkūniškės
Jurkakalnio piliakalnis	Pilies kalnas	Jurkakalnis
Kiemionių piliakalnis		Kiemionys
Kuklių piliakalnis (Zarasai)	Piliakalnio piliakalnis	Kukliai (Zarasai)
Liaudiškių piliakalnis	Laukesos piliakalnis	Liaudiškiai (Zarasai), Laukesa
Lūžų piliakalnis		Lūžos
Maniuliškių piliakalnis		Maniuliškės
Marciūniškių piliakalnis	Palataviškio piliakalnis	Marciūniškės
Mineikiškių piliakalnis		Mineikiškės
Morkūnų piliakalnis		Morkūnai
Narkyčių piliakalnis	Juodasai kalnas	Narkyčiai
Pakačinių piliakalnis	Dembų piliakalnis, Ąžuolų piliakalnis	Ąžuolai (Zarasai), Pakačinės, Dembai
Pakalniškių piliakalnis		Pakalniškiai (Zarasai)
Petraučiznos piliakalnis	Juodasis kalnas	Petraučizna
Piliakalnio piliakalnis (Zarasai)		Piliakalnis (Zarasai)
Salako piliakalnis	Puodkalnis	Salakas
Skineikių piliakalnis		Skineikiai
Suvieko piliakalnis	Žytkalnis	Suviekas
Sviliškių piliakalnis		Sviliškės
Šišponiškių piliakalnis	Piliakalnio piliakalnis	Šišponiškės, Piliakalnis
Šiukščių piliakalnis	Moliakalnis	Šiukščiai
Ūžėniškių piliakalnis		Ūžėniškės
Varniškių piliakalnis		Varniškės
Velikuškių I piliakalnis		Velikuškės
Velikuškių II piliakalnis	Sala	Velikuškės
Vencavų piliakalnis	Kalvinų kalnas	Vencavai
Verslavos piliakalnis		Verslava
Vitkūnų piliakalnis	Smalvų piliakalnis	Smalvos
Vosgėlių piliakalnis	Drageliškių piliakalnis	Vosgėliai (Zarasai)
Zabičiūnų piliakalnis		Zabičiūnai
Zokorių piliakalnis		Zokoriai

== Hillfort groups /complexes ==
- Kernavė Mounds by Kernavė:
  - Lizdeikos kalnas
  - Mindaugo sosto kalnas
  - Aukuro kalnas
  - Pilies kalnas
  - Kriveikiškio piliakalnis
- Sudargas hillforts; lt:Sudargo piliakalniai:
  - Balnakalnis
  - Pilaitė
  - Vorpilis
  - Žydkapiai
  - Burgaičių III piliakalnis
- Gandingos piliakalniai:
  - Pilies kalnas
  - Ožkupris
  - Nausodžio I piliakalnis
  - Nausodžio II piliakalnis
  - Varkalių piliakalnis
- Vilniaus piliakalniai:
  - Gedimino kalnas
  - Stalo kalnas
  - Bekešo kalnas
  - Plikasis kalnas
  - Gedimino kapo kalnas

== See also ==
- List of hillforts in Latvia
