= Ąžuolpamūšė Hillfort =

Hillfort in Lithuania

Coordinates: 56.1234°N 24.4596°E

The Ąžuolpamūšė hillfort, also known as the Dabužiai hillfort, is an archaeological site in Pasvalys district municipality, Lithuania near the village of Ąžuolpamūšė. It includes a Semigallian hillfort and a settlement site. It is located on a high point by the confluence of Tatula and Ūgė rivers.

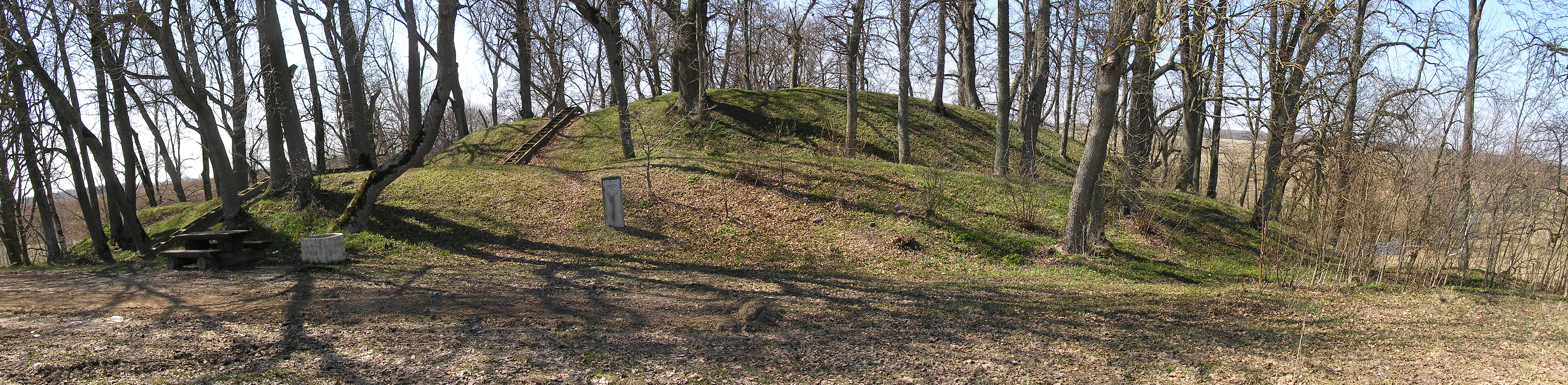

Dated back to 9-13th centuries, in May 1998 it was declared to be a cultural monument of Lithiania.

== See also ==
- List of hillforts in Lithuania
