= Kaniavėlė =

- Village
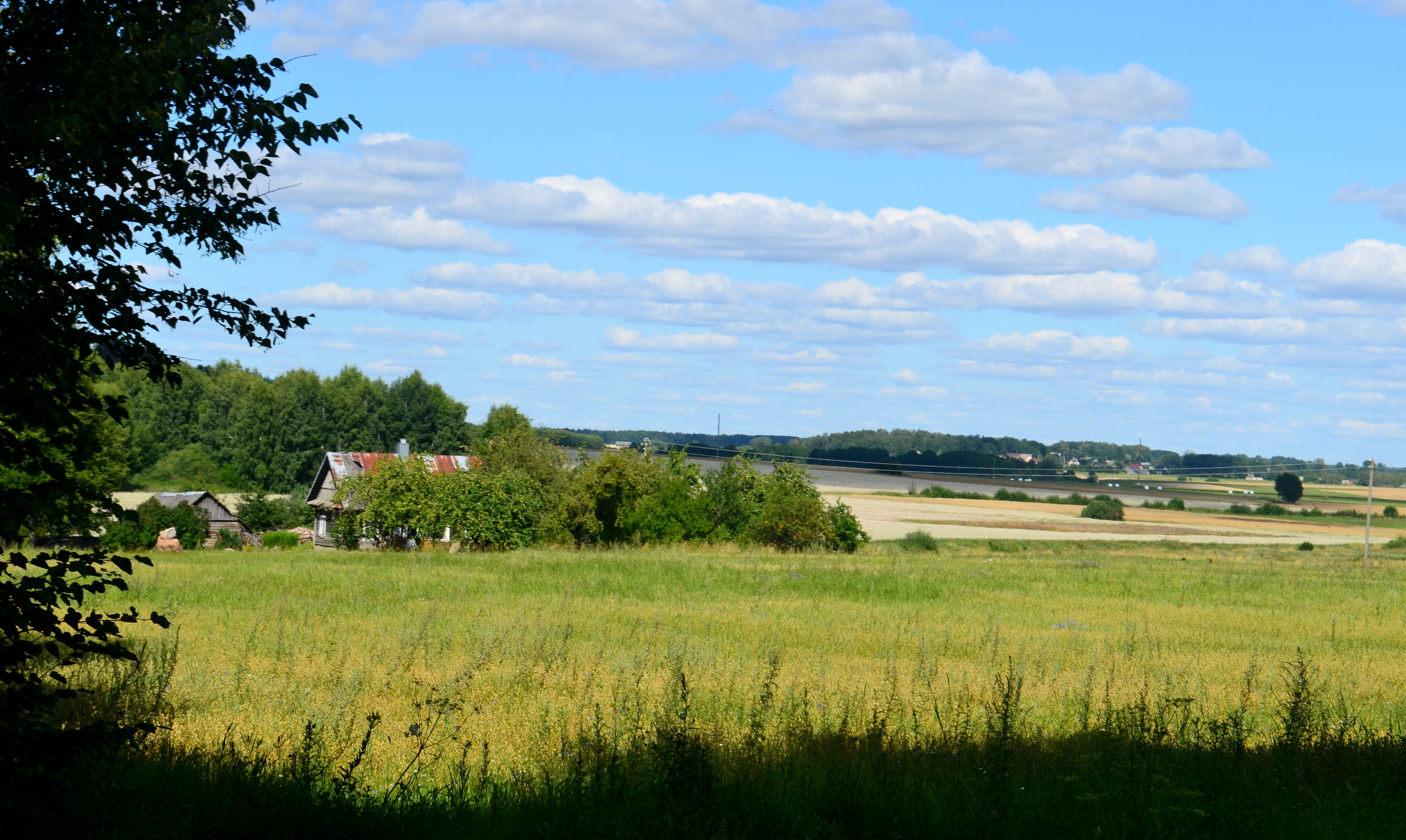

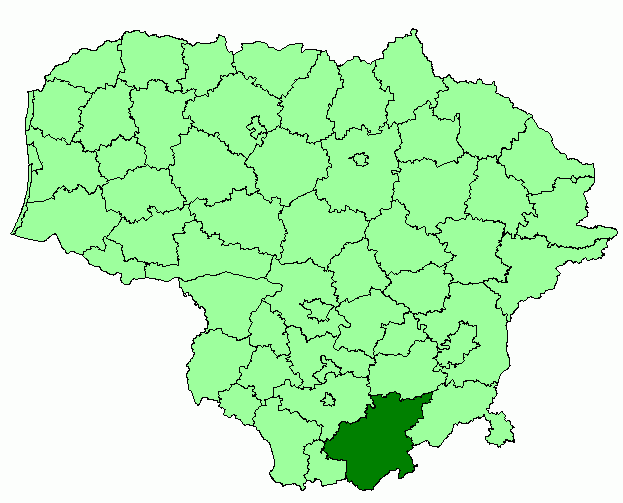
- Location in Varėna district municipality Location of Varėna district in Lithuania
- Coordinates: 54°08′10″N 24°44′20″E
- Country: Lithuania
- County: Alytus County
- Municipality: Varėna
- Eldership: Kaniavos (Kaniava)

Population (2011 Census)
  - Total: 14
- Time zone: UTC+2 (EET)
  - Summer (DST): UTC+3 (EEST)

Kaniavėlė is a village in Kaniavos eldership, Varėna district municipality, Alytus County, southeastern Lithuania. According to the 2001 census, the village had a population of 15 people. At the 2011 census, the population was 14.

== Etymology ==
The name Kaniavėlė comes from the name nearby Kaniava village or river (means 'a little Kaniava').
