= Aukštupėnai Hillfort =

Aukštupėnai mound
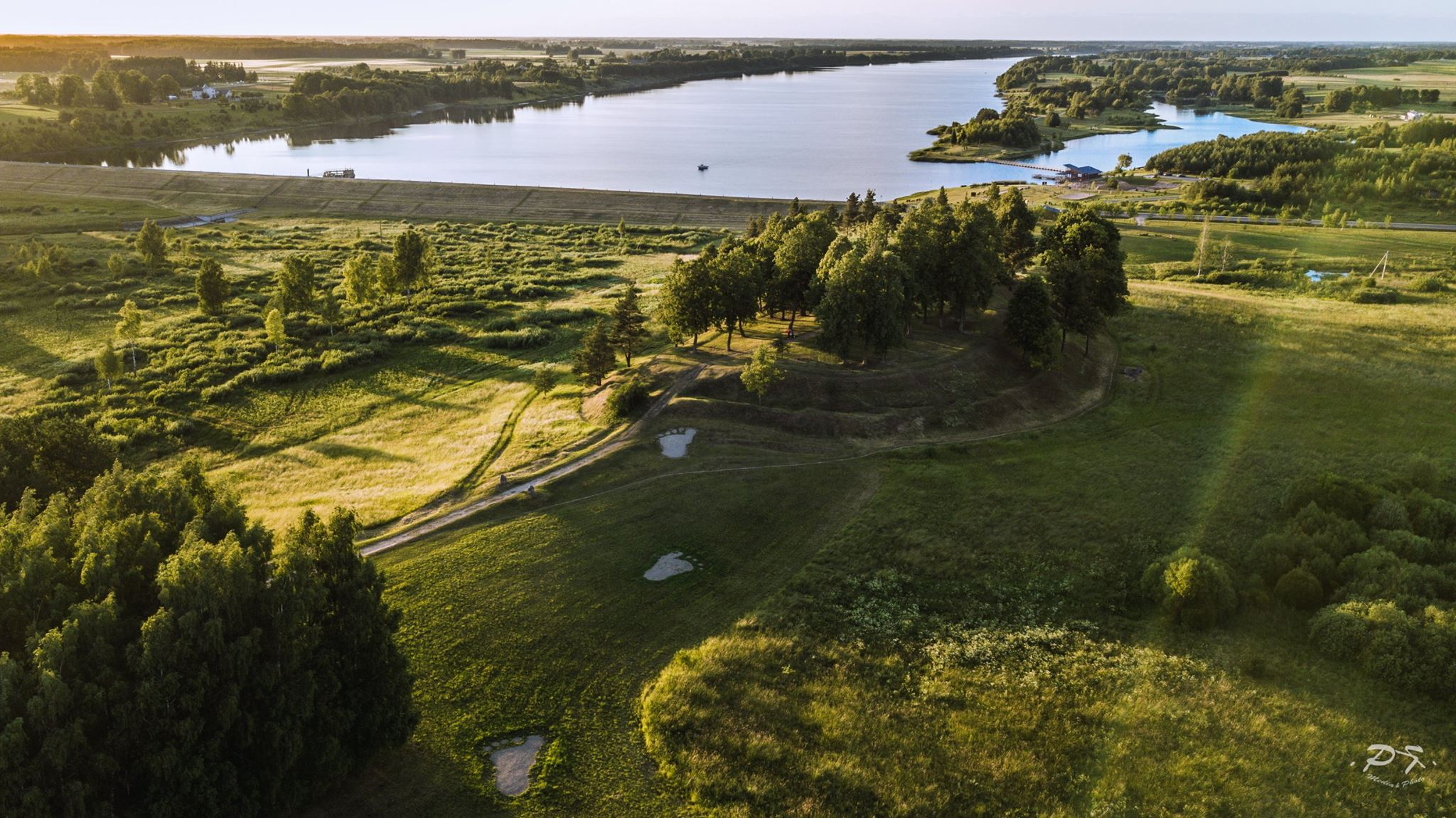
- Aerial view of the hillfort

- Location within Lithuania
- Coordinates: 55°50′51.8″N 24°58′32.2″E
- Country: Lithuania
- Ethnographic region: Aukštaitija
- County: Panevėžys County
- Municipality: Kupiškis district municipality
- Eldership: Kupiškis eldership

Aukštupėnai mound (Lithuanian: Aukštupėnų piliakalnis) or Kupiškis mound (Lithuanian: Kupiškio piliakalnis) is a hillfort in Kupiškis, Lithuania.

== See also ==
- List of hillforts in Lithuania
