= Šilėnai =

- Village
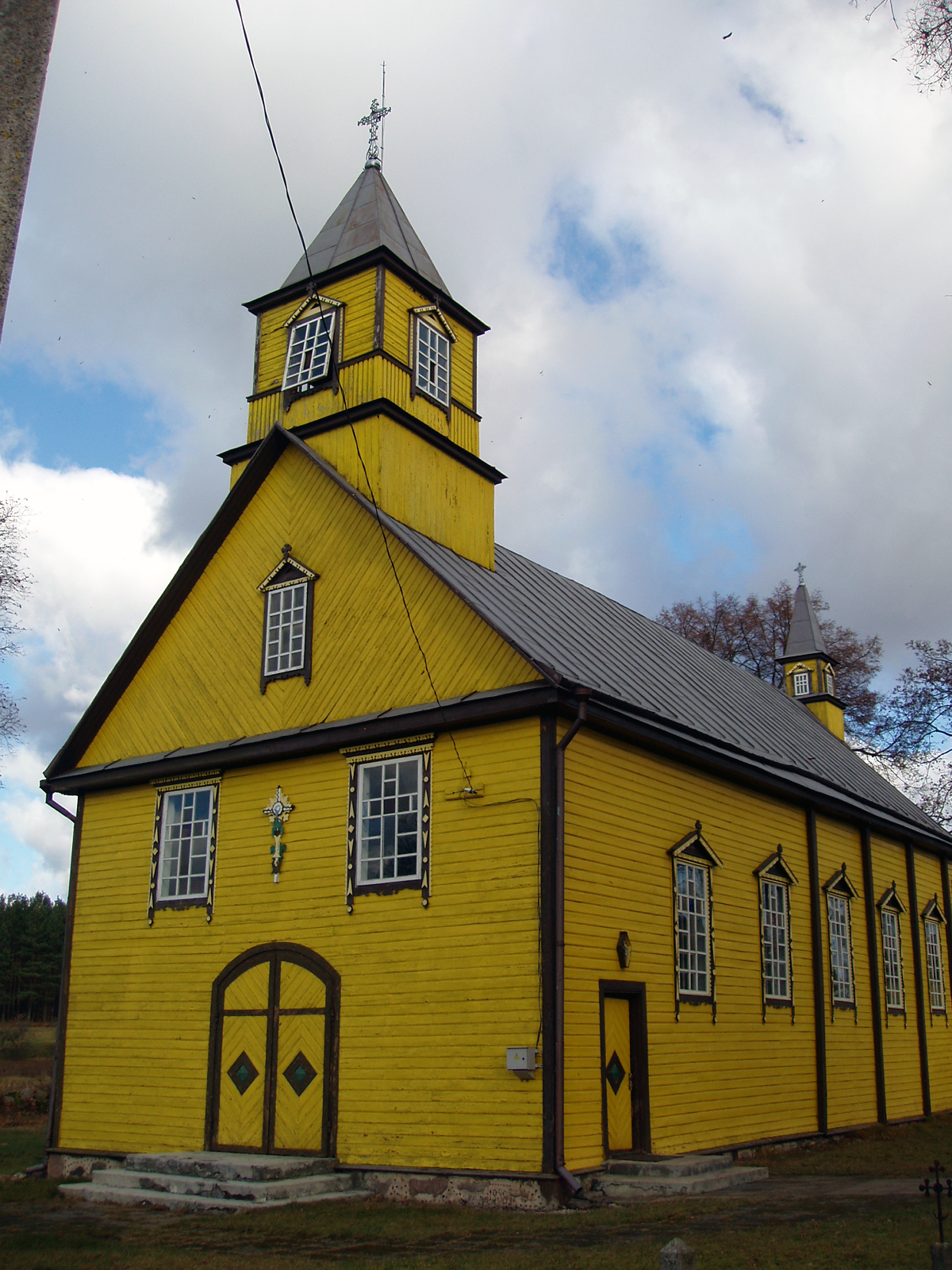
- Church in Šilėnai

- Location of Šilėnai
- Coordinates: 54°43′55″N 25°02′46″E
- Country: Lithuania
- County: Vilnius County
- Municipality: Vilnius District Municipality
- Eldership: Zujūnai eldership

Population (2011)
  - Total: 90
- Time zone: UTC+2 (EET)
  - Summer (DST): UTC+3 (EEST)

Šilėnai is an ethnographic village (ethnographic cultural reserve) located in the Vilnius District Municipality. It is part of the Neris Regional Park. According to the census of 2011, the village has a population of 90, a decrease from 211, counted by the 1970 census. Šilėnai village is known from historical sources from 1500 when it was donated by the Grand Duke of Lithuania Alexander to the bishops of Vilnius. A wooden church, which survived to our days, was built in 1725.
