= Kaniava =

- Village
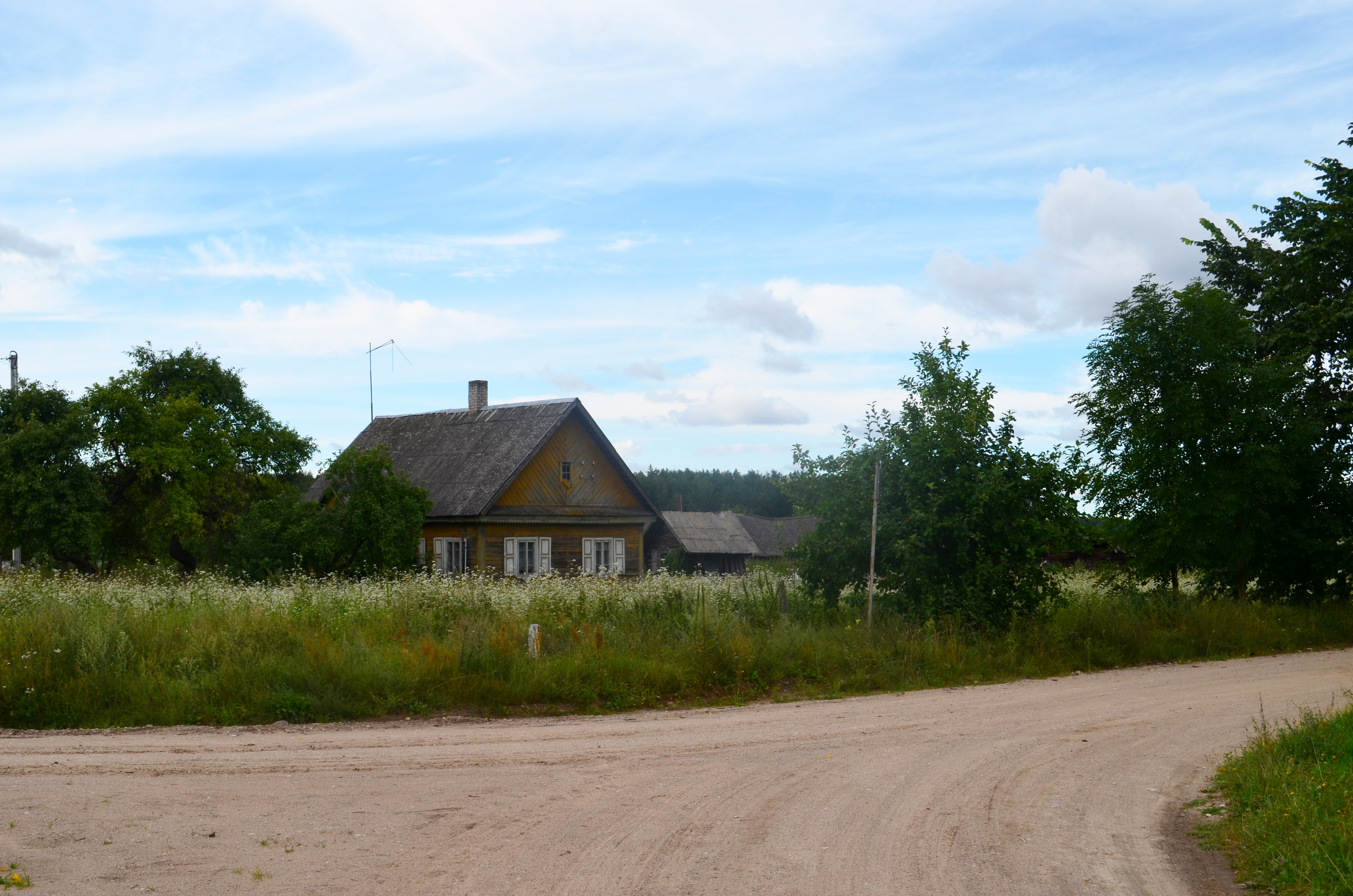

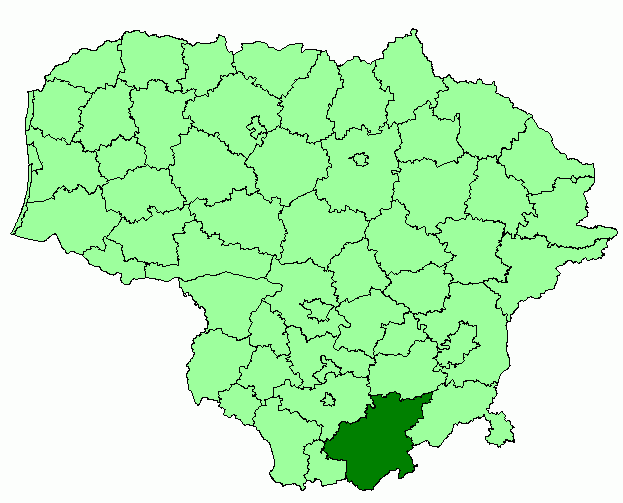
- Location in Varėna district municipality Location of Varėna district in Lithuania
- Coordinates: 54°05′38″N 24°42′22″E
- Country: Lithuania
- County: Alytus County
- Municipality: Varėna
- Eldership: Kaniavos (Kaniava)

Population (2011 Census)
  - Total: 23
- Time zone: UTC+2 (EET)
  - Summer (DST): UTC+3 (EEST)

Kaniava is a village in Kaniavos eldership, Varėna district municipality, Alytus County, southeastern Lithuania. According to the 2001 census, the village had a population of 39 people. At the 2011 census, the population was 23.

== Etymology ==
The name Kaniava is of unclear origin. It may come from the river of the same name (Kaniava River, Kaniavėlė River) which may be of Finno-Ugric descent (for example, from Estonian: kaan 'a leech') or may be same origin as Slavic words kanja, kania, каня 'a buzzard. Otherwise, the village name may be of prior origin and could come from personal names: Lithuanian: Kãniava, Kaniáuka, Kanáuka, Kãniovas, Belarusian: Конеў, Russian: Конев which ultimately descends from Slavic конь 'a horse'. It could be even a common name kaniava, конеў which could mean 'a stableman'.
