= Krūminiai =

Coordinates: 54°18′N 24°50′E

- Village
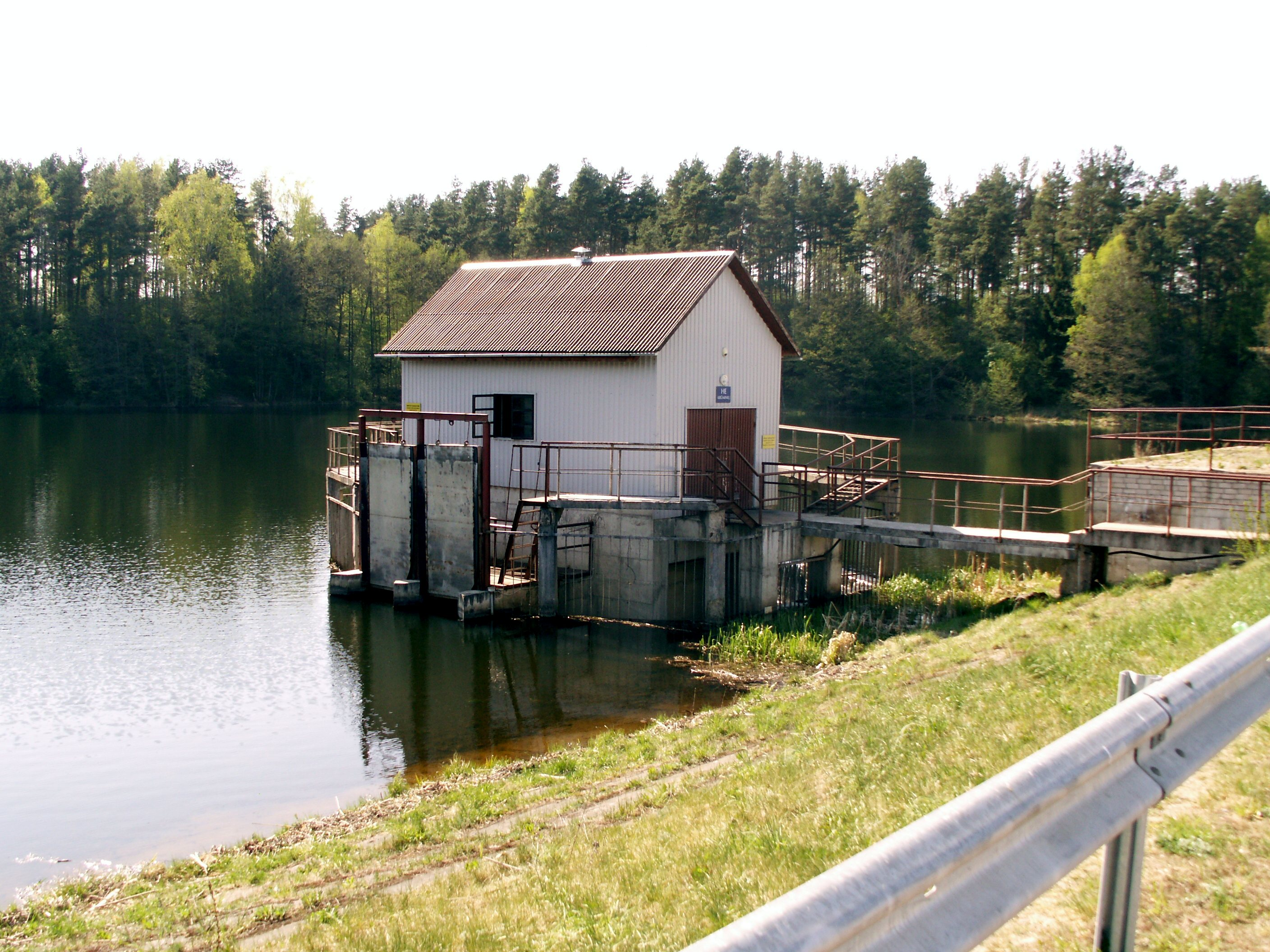
- Interactive map of Krūminiai
- Country: Lithuania
- County: Alytus County
- Municipality: Varėna

Population (2001)
  - Total: 207
- Time zone: UTC+2 (EET)
  - Summer (DST): UTC+3 (EEST)

Krūminiai is a village in Varėna district municipality, in Alytus County, in southeastern Lithuania. According to the 2001 census, the village has a population of 207 people.

== Etymology ==
The name Krūminiai comes from a personal name Krūminis which originates from Lithuanian: krū́minis 'a one who/which inhabits in a forest, in a wild place; a wild, savage one'.
