= Ambraziūnai =

- Village
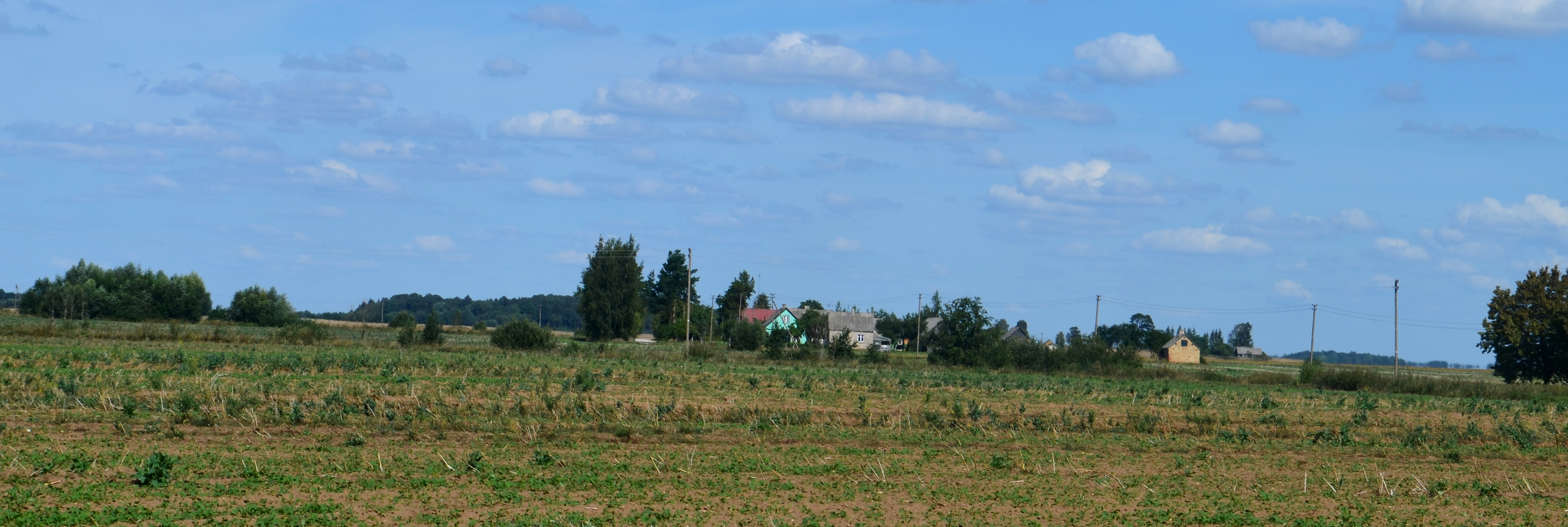

- Location in Lithuania Ambraziūnai (Lithuania)
- Coordinates: 55°21′22″N 23°40′19″E
- Country: Lithuania
- County: Kaunas County
- Municipality: Kėdainiai district municipality
- Eldership: Krakės Eldership

Population (2011)
  - Total: 15
- Time zone: UTC+2 (EET)
  - Summer (DST): UTC+3 (EEST)

Ambraziūnai (formerly Polish: Ambrożuny, Ambryżuny, Russian: Амброжуны) is a village in Kėdainiai district municipality, in Kaunas County, in central Lithuania. According to the 2011 census, the village had a population of 15 people. It is located 1 kilometre (0.62 mi) from Plinkaigalis, near the left bank of the Šušvė river. The Ambraziūnai Hillfort is located in the village.

== History ==
At the beginning of the 20th century, Ambraziūnai was an okolica. It was a property of the Deveikiai, Ivaškevičiai, Mostavičiai, Račkauskai families.

== Demography ==
Historical population

Year	Pop.	±% p.a.
1902	75	—
1923	42	−2.72%
1959	36	−0.43%
1970	33	−0.79%

Year	Pop.	±% p.a.
1979	24	−3.48%
1989	13	−5.95%
2001	18	+2.75%
2011	15	−1.81%

Source: 1902, 1923, 1959 & 1970, 1979, 1989, 2001, 2011

== Images ==
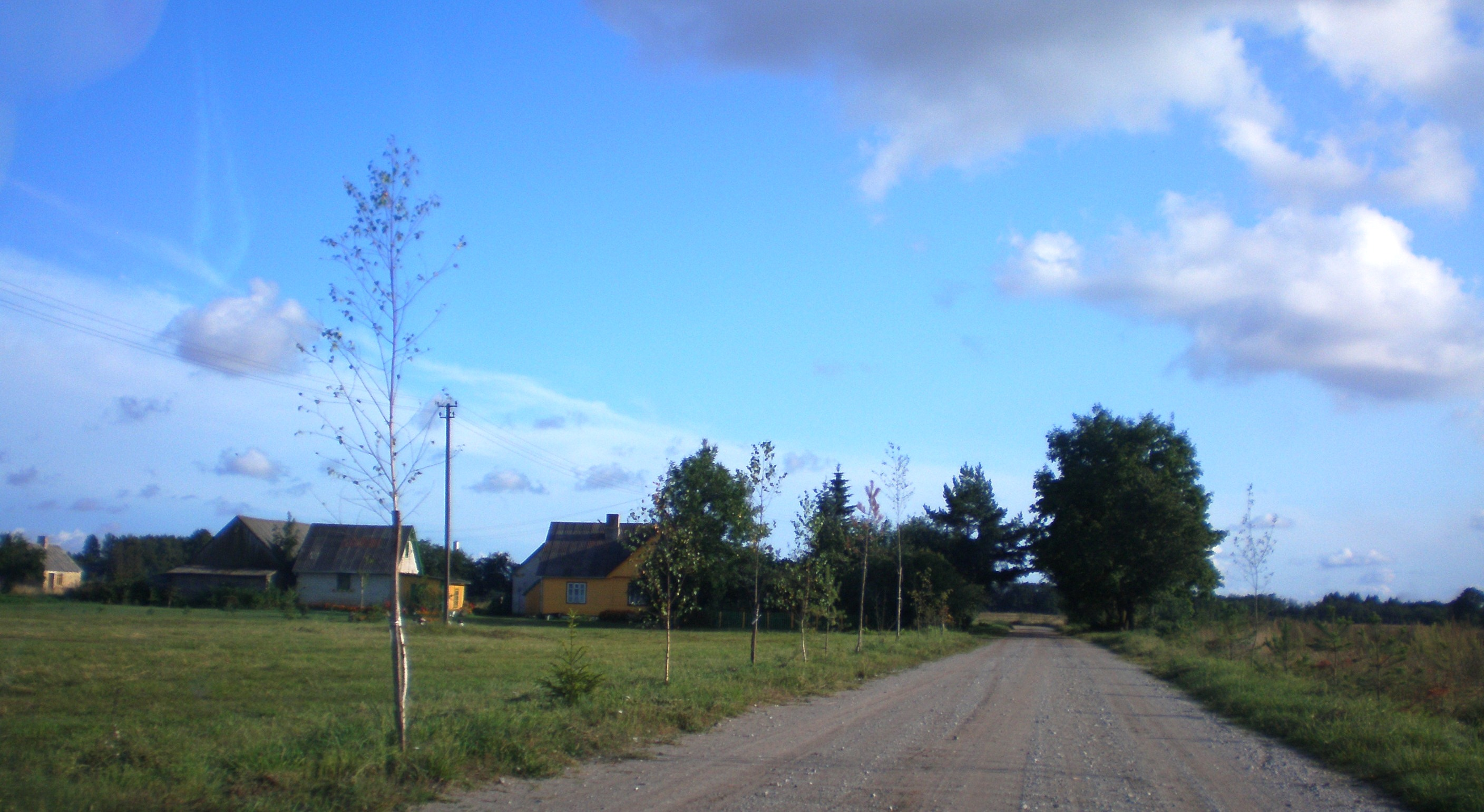
A street in Ambraziūnai

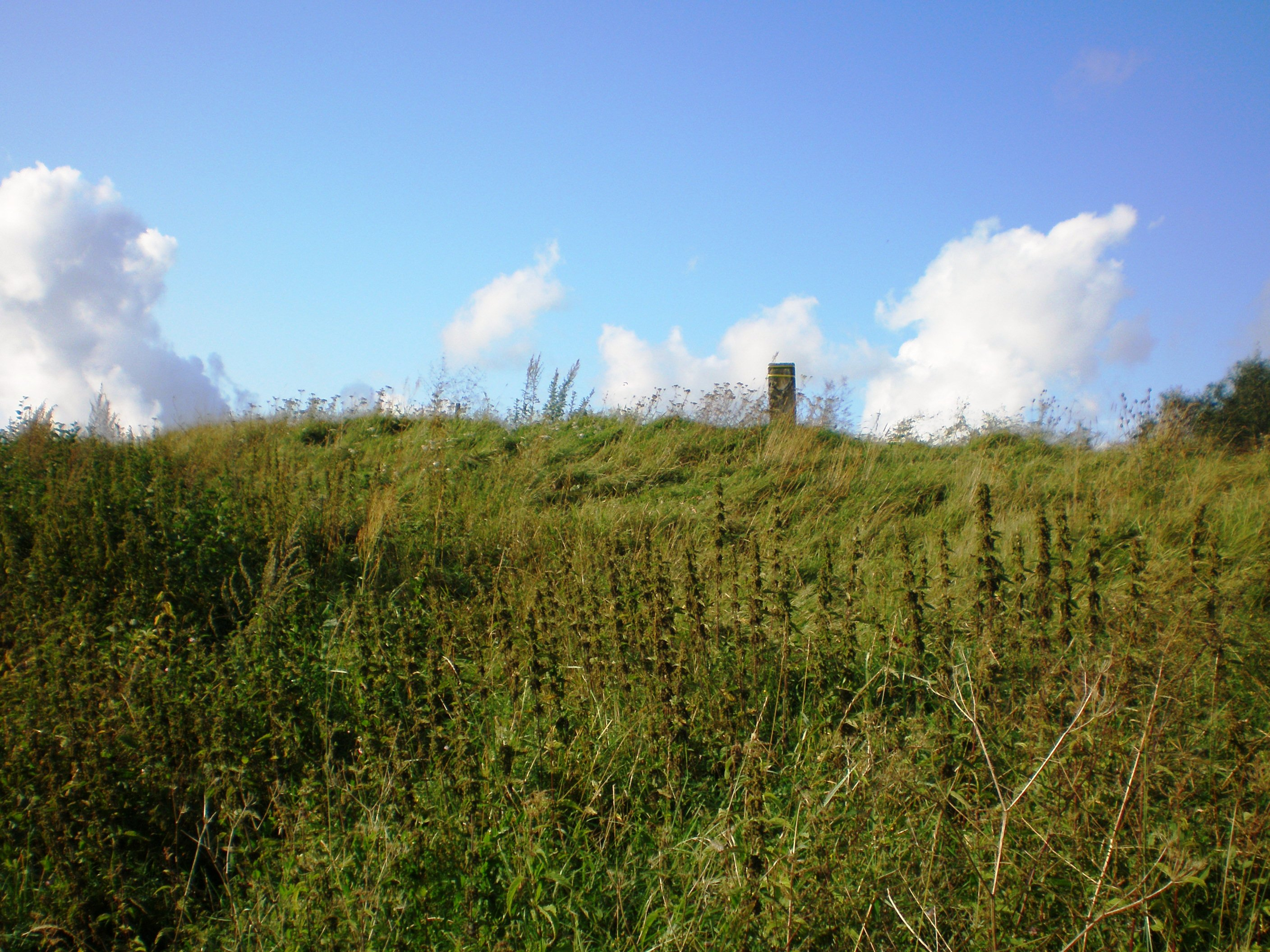
The Ambraziūnai Hillfort
