= Barčiai (Varėna) =

Coordinates: 54°11′10″N 24°40′01″E

- Village
- Interactive map of Barčiai
- Country: Lithuania
- County: Alytus County
- Municipality: Varėna

Population (2001)
  - Total: 182
- Time zone: UTC+2 (EET)
  - Summer (DST): UTC+3 (EEST)

Barčiai is a village in Varėna district municipality, in Alytus County, in southeastern Lithuania. According to the 2001 census, the village has a population of 182 people.
