= Gudžioniai =

- Village
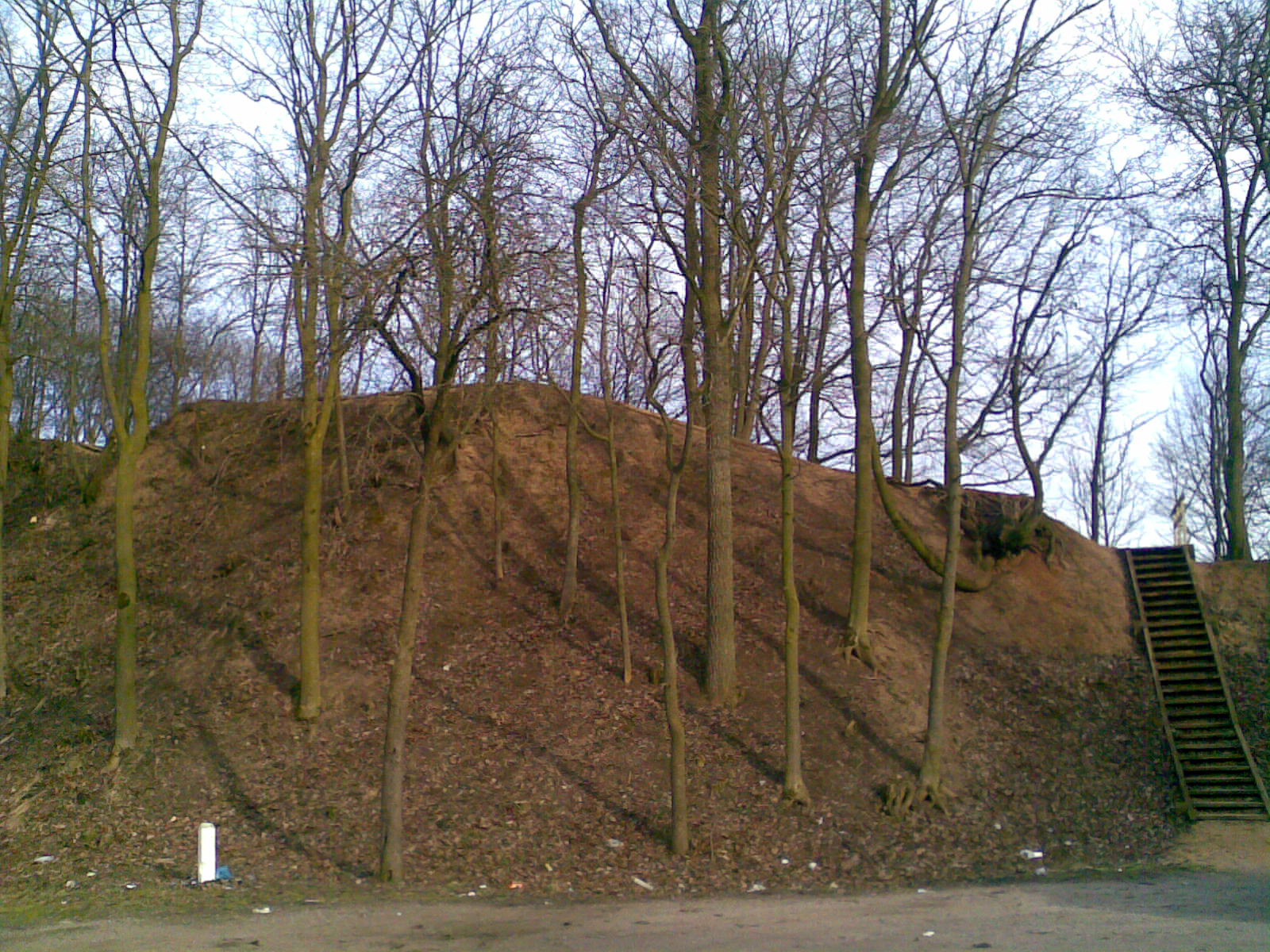

- Location within Lithuania
- Coordinates: 55°4′44″N 24°19′9″E
- Country: Lithuania
- County: Kaunas County
- Municipality: Jonava

Population (2011)
  - Total: 39
- Time zone: UTC+2 (EET)
  - Summer (DST): UTC+3 (EEST)

Gudžioniai is a village in Jonava district municipality, in Kaunas County, in central Lithuania. According to the 2011 census, the village has a population of 39 people.
