= Burgaičiai =

Village in western Lithuania

- Village
- Location within Lithuania
- Coordinates: 55°2′20.4″N 22°38′9.6″E
- Country: Lithuania
- County: Marijampolė County
- Municipality: Šakiai District Municipality
- Elderate: Sudargas elderate

Population (2021)
  - Total: 144
- Time zone: UTC+2 (EET)
  - Summer (DST): UTC+3 (EEST)

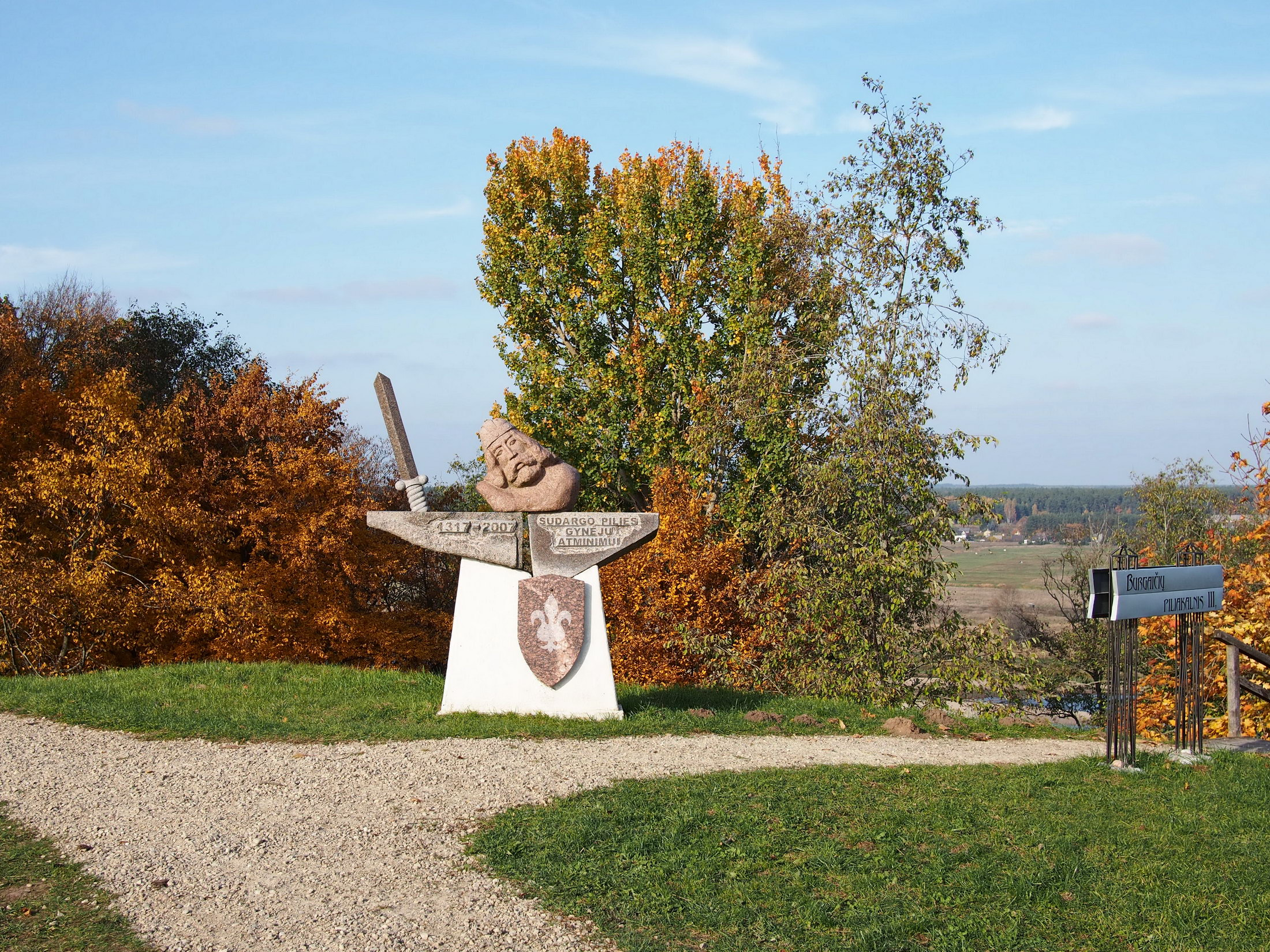
A monument dedicated to the defenders of Sudargas Castle from 1317

Burgaičiai is a village located in Šakiai district municipality, west Lithuania, at the western edge of Sudargas, on the left bank of Nemunas river. On the northern edge of the village there are three Burgaičiai mounds. There is the Evangelical Lutheran Church of Emaus in Sudargas.

The village has a monument dedicated to the defenders of Sudargas Castle from 1317.

== Demography ==
Historical population
Year	1888	1923	1959	1970	1979	1989	2001	2011	2021
Pop.	421	331	204	212	219	207	181	184	144
±%	—	−21.4%	−38.4%	+3.9%	+3.3%	−5.5%	−12.6%	+1.7%	−21.7%
Source: Statistics Lithuania
