= Lukštai =

- Village
- Location within Lithuania
- Coordinates: 56.030°N 25.733°E
- Country: Lithuania
- County: Panevėžys County

Population
  - Total: 184
- Time zone: Eastern European Time (UTC+2)
  - Summer (DST): Eastern European Summer Time (UTC+3)

Lukštai is a village in Rokiškis District Municipality, Panevėžys County, Lithuania. The population was 184 in 2011. It is located near the border with Latvia.
