= Butvydonys =

Coordinates: 54°16′N 24°49′E

- Village
- Interactive map of Butvydonys
- Country: Lithuania
- County: Alytus County
- Municipality: Varėna

Population (2001)
  - Total: 65
- Time zone: UTC+2 (EET)
  - Summer (DST): UTC+3 (EEST)

Butvydonys is a village in Varėna district municipality, in Alytus County, in southeastern Lithuania. According to the 2001 census, the village has a population of 65 people.

== Etymology ==
The name Butvydonys comes from an archaic Lithuanian personal name Butvydas.
