= Žemoji Panemunė =

- Town
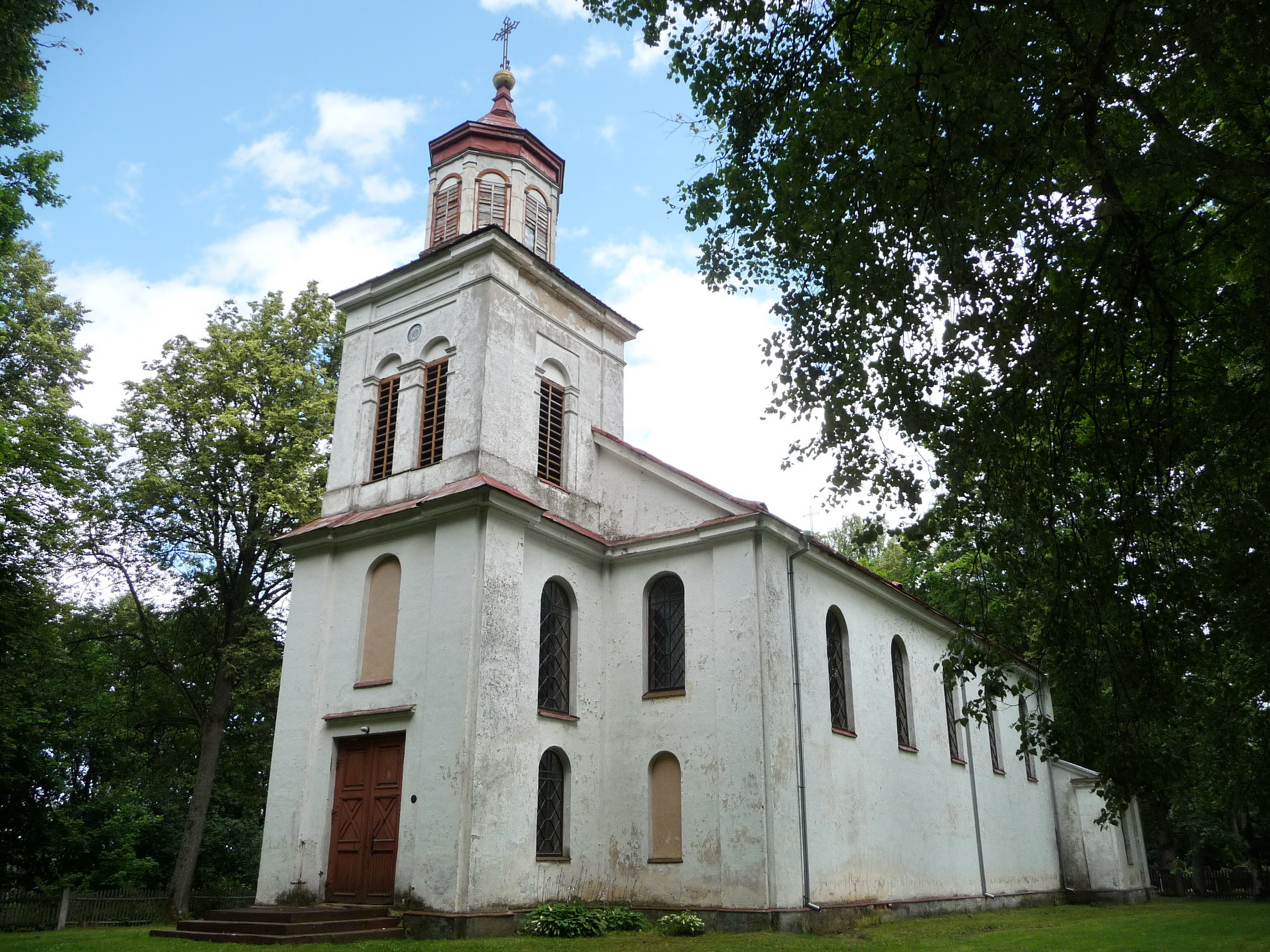

- Location within Lithuania
- Coordinates: 55°02′50″N 23°27′50″E
- Country: Lithuania
- County: Marijampolė County

Population (2011)
  - Total: 64
- Time zone: UTC+2 (EET)
  - Summer (DST): UTC+3 (EEST)

Žemoji Panemunė is a small town in Marijampolė County, in southwestern Lithuania. According to the 2011 census, the town has a population of 64 people.
