= Bakšėnai =

- Village
- Location within Lithuania
- Coordinates: 55.938°N 24.935°E
- Country: Lithuania
- County: Panevėžys County

Population
  - Total: 130
- Time zone: Eastern European Time (UTC+2)
  - Summer (DST): Eastern European Summer Time (UTC+3)

Bakšėnai is a village in Kupiškis District Municipality, Panevėžys County, Lithuania. The population was 130 in 2011.
