= Radžiūnai (Varėna) =

- Village
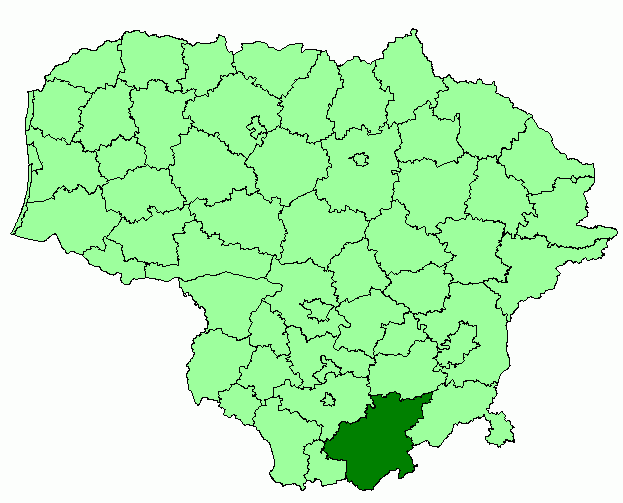
- Location in Varėna district municipality Location of Varėna district in Lithuania
- Coordinates: 54°25′08″N 24°37′59″E
- Country: Lithuania
- County: Alytus County
- Municipality: Varėna
- Eldership: Jakėnų (Jakėnai)

Population (2011 Census)
  - Total: 4
- Time zone: UTC+2 (EET)
  - Summer (DST): UTC+3 (EEST)

Radžiūnai is a village in Jakėnų eldership, Varėna district municipality, Alytus County, southeastern Lithuania. According to the 2001 census, the village has a population of 12 people. At the 2011 census, the population was 4.
