= Avilčiai =

- Village
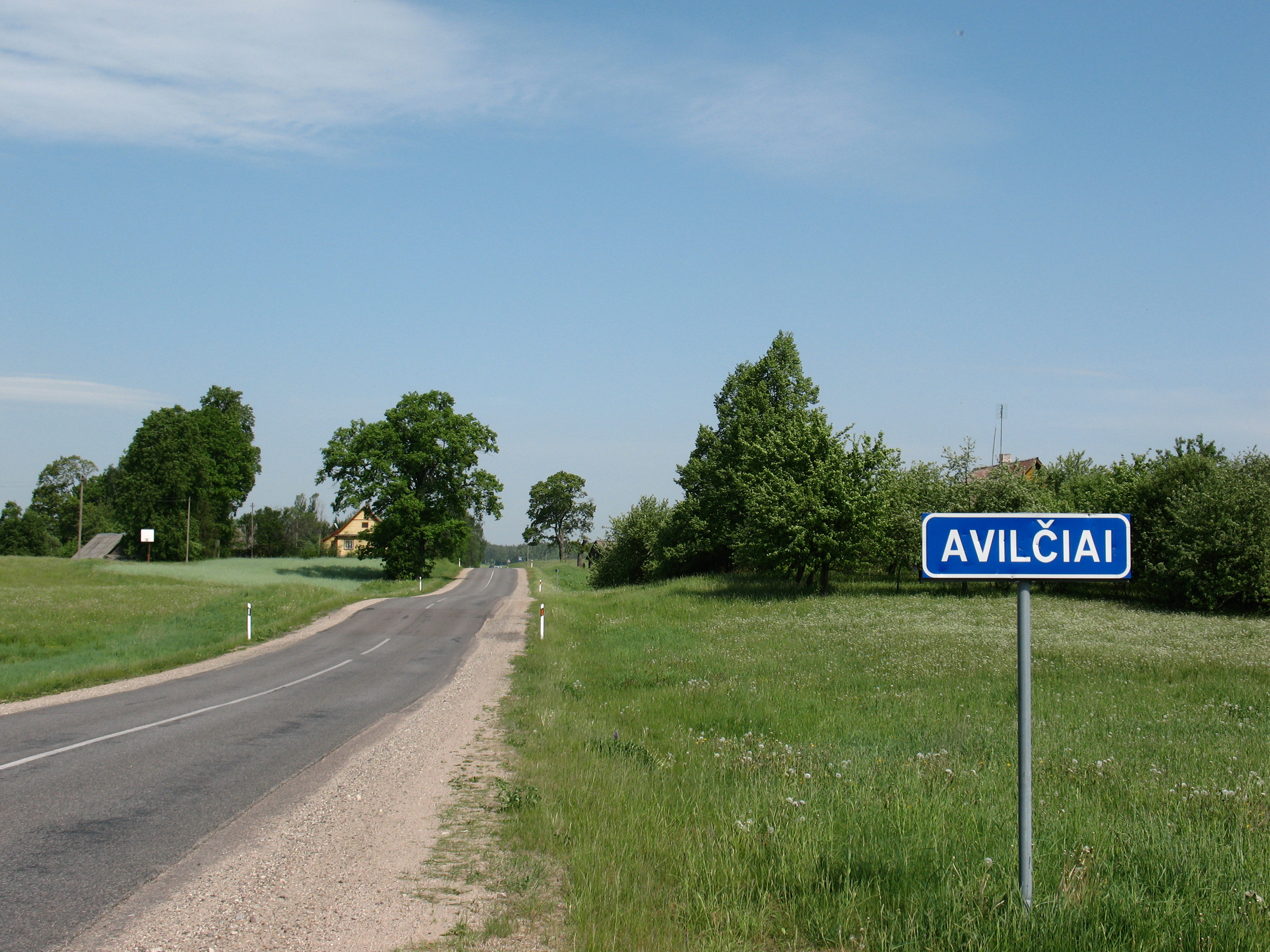
- The entrance to Avilčiai

- Location of Avilčiai
- Coordinates: 55°18′00″N 25°21′00″E
- Country: Lithuania
- Ethnographic region: Aukštaitija
- County: Utena County
- Municipality: Molėtai district municipality
- Eldesrhip: Alanta eldership

Population (2011)
  - Total: 27
- Time zone: UTC+2 (EET)
  - Summer (DST): UTC+3 (EEST)

Avilčiai /əˈvɪltʃeɪ/ is a small village in the Molėtai district municipality, Lithuania, halfway between the towns of Molėtai and Alanta. Only about 27 people, mostly seniors, live in Avilčiai.

People lived in the environs of Avilčiai since ancient times as evidenced by archeological artifacts. During the Soviet times the village had a school and a library. There were 21 families (95 people) living there more than 60 years ago. After the melioration, most of the people moved out because their houses were torn down. There is almost no youth in Avilčiai so the school was closed down.

A ritual stone with a hole that looks like a man's foot is located near the village.

== Sources ==
- Book (in Lithuanian): A.Pivoras "Švyti Alanta nuo tėviškės kalvos"
- "TuTiempo.net profile" (in Spanish).
