= List of towns in Lithuania =

Towns in Lithuania (singular: Lithuanian: miestelis, as diminutive of miestas) retain their historical distinctiveness even though for statistical purposes they are counted together with villages. At the time of the census in 2001, there were 103 cities, 244 towns, and some 21,000 villages in Lithuania. Since then three cities (Juodupė, Kulautuva, and Tyruliai) and two villages (Salakas and Jūrė) became towns. Therefore, during the Lithuanian census of 2011, there were 249 towns in Lithuania.

Lithuanian towns (miesteliai) began forming in the late medieval period as small commercial and administrative centres distinct from larger cities. The term "miestelis" appears in records from 1387, and by the 16th century many such settlements received formal privileges, often developing around manors, markets and parish institutions. Their number grew through the 17th century, though wars and shifting political conditions later altered or reduced many of them. In the 19th century, new towns emerged along major roads and railways, supported by trade, crafts and small industry. Under Soviet rule, administrative reforms reshaped their status, with many becoming collective-farm or district centres. Since the restoration of independence in 1990, Lithuanian towns have generally stabilised as local civic and cultural hubs, maintaining a distinctive role in the country's settlement structure.

According to Lithuanian law, a town is a compactly-built settlement with a population of 500–3,000 and at least half of the population works in economic sectors other than agriculture. However, there are many exceptions as many cities, towns, and villages retain their statuses based on historical tradition. Towns usually have a church and are capitals of elderates. Some towns have a coat of arms.

== Towns ==
#	Town	Population (2001 census)	Population (2011 census)	County	Municipality
1	Adutiškis	778	689	Vilnius County	Švenčionys District Municipality
2	Akademija, Kaunas	4,213	2,807	Kaunas County	Kaunas District Municipality
3	Akademija, Kėdainiai	873	752	Kaunas County	Kėdainiai District Municipality
4	Alanta	464	348	Utena County	Molėtai District Municipality
5	Alizava	450	344	Panevėžys County	Kupiškis District Municipality
6	Alsėdžiai	956	896	Telšiai County	Plungė District Municipality
7	Andrioniškis	278	229	Utena County	Anykščiai District Municipality
8	Antalieptė	359	278	Utena County	Zarasai District Municipality
9	Antašava	247	227	Panevėžys County	Kupiškis District Municipality
10	Aukštadvaris	1,031	977	Vilnius County	Trakai District Municipality
11	Babtai	1,715	1,563	Kaunas County	Kaunas District Municipality
12	Bagaslaviškis	185	110	Vilnius County	Širvintos District Municipality
13	Baisogala	2,548	2,034	Šiauliai County	Radviliškis District Municipality
14	Balbieriškis	1,180	966	Kaunas County	Prienai District Municipality
15	Balninkai	470	319	Utena County	Molėtai District Municipality
16	Barstyčiai	659	528	Klaipėda County	Skuodas District Municipality
17	Bartninkai	495	390	Marijampolė County	Vilkaviškis District Municipality
18	Barzdai	472	385	Marijampolė County	Šakiai District Municipality
19	Batakiai	261	246	Tauragė County	Tauragė District Municipality
20	Bazilionai	475	390	Šiauliai County	Šiauliai District Municipality
21	Betygala	559	488	Kaunas County	Raseiniai District Municipality
22	Bezdonys	857	743	Vilnius County	Vilnius District Municipality
23	Butrimonys	1,126	941	Alytus County	Alytus District Municipality
24	Čedasai	239	196	Panevėžys County	Rokiškis District Municipality
25	Čekiškė	734	682	Kaunas County	Kaunas District Municipality
26	Darbėnai	1,598	1,461	Klaipėda County	Kretinga District Municipality
27	Daugailiai	351	325	Utena County	Utena District Municipality
28	Daujėnai	479	423	Panevėžys County	Pasvalys District Municipality
29	Daukšiai	310	275	Marijampolė County	Marijampolė municipality
30	Debeikiai	452	404	Utena County	Anykščiai District Municipality
31	Deltuva	503	513	Vilnius County	Ukmergė District Municipality
32	Dieveniškės	916	720	Vilnius County	Šalčininkai District Municipality
33	Dotnuva	775	687	Kaunas County	Kėdainiai District Municipality
34	Dovilai	1,231	1,246	Klaipėda County	Klaipėda District Municipality
35	Dubingiai	239	208	Utena County	Molėtai District Municipality
36	Duokiškis	248	180	Panevėžys County	Rokiškis District Municipality
37	Eigirdžiai	746	630	Telšiai County	Telšiai District Municipality
38	Endriejavas	718	640	Klaipėda County	Klaipėda District Municipality
39	Eržvilkas	518	429	Tauragė County	Jurbarkas District Municipality
40	Gadūnavas	122	98	Telšiai County	Telšiai District Municipality
41	Gardamas	437	398	Klaipėda County	Šilutė District Municipality
42	Gaurė	468	418	Tauragė County	Tauragė District Municipality
43	Geležiai	386	317	Panevėžys County	Panevėžys District Municipality
44	Gelvonai	380	284	Vilnius County	Širvintos District Municipality
45	Giedraičiai	778	684	Utena County	Molėtai District Municipality
46	Girkalnis	997	877	Kaunas County	Raseiniai District Municipality
47	Gražiškiai	401	349	Marijampolė County	Vilkaviškis District Municipality
48	Grinkiškis	900	678	Šiauliai County	Radviliškis District Municipality
49	Griškabūdis	1,024	857	Marijampolė County	Šakiai District Municipality
50	Gruzdžiai	1,747	1,467	Šiauliai County	Šiauliai District Municipality
51	Gudeliai	447	340	Marijampolė County	Marijampolė municipality
52	Gudžiūnai	656	491	Kaunas County	Kėdainiai District Municipality
53	Igliškėliai	334	231	Marijampolė County	Marijampolė municipality
54	Janapolė	465	341	Telšiai County	Telšiai District Municipality
55	Jašiūnai	1,879	642	Vilnius County	Šalčininkai District Municipality
56	Joniškis, Utena	325	258	Utena County	Molėtai District Municipality
57	Josvainiai	1,545	1,057	Kaunas County	Kėdainiai District Municipality
58	Judrėnai	531	468	Klaipėda County	Klaipėda District Municipality
	Juodupė		1,769	Panevėžys County	Rokiškis District Municipality
	Jūrė		401	Marijampolė County	Kazlų Rūda Municipality
59	Jūžintai	491	412	Panevėžys County	Rokiškis District Municipality
60	Kačerginė	715	772	Kaunas County	Kaunas District Municipality
61	Kairiai	1,158	1,822	Šiauliai County	Šiauliai District Municipality
62	Kaltanėnai	282	204	Vilnius County	Švenčionys District Municipality
63	Kaltinėnai	835	728	Tauragė County	Šilalė District Municipality
64	Kamajai	681	577	Panevėžys County	Rokiškis District Municipality
65	Kapčiamiestis	691	589	Alytus County	Lazdijai District Municipality
66	Karklėnai	401	285	Šiauliai County	Kelmė District Municipality
67	Karmėlava	2,886	1,395	Kaunas County	Kaunas District Municipality
68	Kartena	1,022	931	Klaipėda County	Kretinga District Municipality
69	Katyčiai	737	526	Klaipėda County	Šilutė District Municipality
70	Kernavė	307	272	Vilnius County	Širvintos District Municipality
71	Keturvalakiai	134	113	Marijampolė County	Vilkaviškis District Municipality
72	Kintai	833	616	Klaipėda County	Šilutė District Municipality
73	Klovainiai	980	785	Šiauliai County	Pakruojis District Municipality
74	Krakės	991	841	Kaunas County	Kėdainiai District Municipality
75	Kražiai	784	603	Šiauliai County	Kelmė District Municipality
76	Krekenava	2,003	1,636	Panevėžys County	Panevėžys District Municipality
77	Kretingalė	977	936	Klaipėda County	Klaipėda District Municipality
78	Krikliniai	290	228	Panevėžys County	Pasvalys District Municipality
79	Krinčinas	527	461	Panevėžys County	Pasvalys District Municipality
80	Kriukai	602	533	Šiauliai County	Joniškis District Municipality
81	Kriūkai	371	291	Marijampolė County	Šakiai District Municipality
82	Krokialaukis	239	218	Alytus County	Alytus District Municipality
83	Krosna	401	330	Alytus County	Lazdijai District Municipality
84	Kruonis	726	661	Kaunas County	Kaišiadorys District Municipality
85	Kruopiai	614	508	Šiauliai County	Akmenė District Municipality
86	Kuktiškės	485	435	Utena County	Utena District Municipality
	Kulautuva		1,425	Kaunas District Municipality	Kaunas County
87	Kuliai	704	625	Telšiai County	Plungė District Municipality
88	Kupreliškis	248	188	Panevėžys County	Biržai District Municipality
89	Kurkliai	474	374	Utena County	Anykščiai District Municipality
90	Kurtuvėnai	326	256	Šiauliai County	Šiauliai District Municipality
91	Kužiai	1,420	1,168	Šiauliai County	Šiauliai District Municipality
92	Kvėdarna	1,934	1,597	Tauragė County	Šilalė District Municipality
93	Labanoras	75	59	Vilnius County	Švenčionys District Municipality
94	Laižuva	560	485	Telšiai County	Mažeikiai District Municipality
95	Lapės	1,038	1,218	Kaunas County	Kaunas District Municipality
96	Lauko Soda	177	134	Telšiai County	Telšiai District Municipality
97	Laukuva	998	832	Tauragė County	Šilalė District Municipality
98	Leckava	235	195	Telšiai County	Mažeikiai District Municipality
99	Leipalingis	1,736	1,552	Alytus County	Druskininkai municipality
100	Lekėčiai	1,040	848	Marijampolė County	Šakiai District Municipality
101	Leliūnai	483	412	Utena County	Utena District Municipality
102	Lenkimai	779	647	Klaipėda County	Skuodas District Municipality
103	Lioliai	544	485	Šiauliai County	Kelmė District Municipality
104	Liudvinavas	1,055	966	Marijampolė County	Marijampolė municipality
105	Lukšiai	1,651	1,485	Marijampolė County	Šakiai District Municipality
106	Luokė	777	629	Telšiai County	Telšiai District Municipality
107	Lyduokiai	169	142	Vilnius County	Ukmergė District Municipality
108	Lyduvėnai	125	99	Kaunas County	Raseiniai District Municipality
109	Lygumai	664	601	Šiauliai County	Pakruojis District Municipality
110	Maišiagala	1,634	1,636	Vilnius County	Vilnius District Municipality
111	Merkinė	1,434	1,228	Alytus County	Varėna District Municipality
112	Meškuičiai	1,218	1,056	Šiauliai County	Šiauliai District Municipality
113	Mickūnai	1,415	1,389	Vilnius County	Vilnius District Municipality
114	Mielagėnai	286	236	Utena County	Ignalina District Municipality
115	Miežiškiai	716	651	Panevėžys County	Panevėžys District Municipality
116	Mosėdis	1,379	1,141	Klaipėda County	Skuodas District Municipality
117	Musninkai	472	415	Vilnius County	Širvintos District Municipality
118	Naujamiestis, Panevėžys	832	725	Panevėžys County	Panevėžys District Municipality
119	Nemakščiai	905	748	Kaunas County	Raseiniai District Municipality
120	Nemunaitis	218	153	Alytus County	Alytus District Municipality
121	Nemunėlio Radviliškis	729	566	Panevėžys County	Biržai District Municipality
122	Nerimdaičiai	349	281	Telšiai County	Telšiai District Municipality
123	Nevarėnai	659	552	Telšiai County	Telšiai District Municipality
124	Onuškis	584	519	Vilnius County	Trakai District Municipality
125	Pabaiskas	249	234	Vilnius County	Ukmergė District Municipality
126	Pabiržė	364	300	Panevėžys County	Biržai District Municipality
127	Pagiriai	523	358	Kaunas County	Kėdainiai District Municipality
128	Pagramantis	569	434	Tauragė County	Tauragė District Municipality
129	Pajūris	872	784	Tauragė County	Šilalė District Municipality
130	Pakuonis	680	608	Kaunas County	Prienai District Municipality
131	Palėvenė	89	74	Panevėžys County	Kupiškis District Municipality
132	Palonai	441	345	Šiauliai County	Radviliškis District Municipality
133	Panemunėlis	287	192	Panevėžys County	Rokiškis District Municipality
134	Panemunis	308	231	Panevėžys County	Rokiškis District Municipality
135	Panoteriai	399	360	Kaunas County	Jonava District Municipality
136	Papilė	1,449	1,007	Šiauliai County	Akmenė District Municipality
137	Papilys	312	236	Panevėžys County	Biržai District Municipality
138	Pašilė	224	160	Šiauliai County	Kelmė District Municipality
139	Pašušvys	395	331	Šiauliai County	Radviliškis District Municipality
140	Pašvitinys	440	350	Šiauliai County	Pakruojis District Municipality
141	Pavandenė	323	317	Telšiai County	Telšiai District Municipality
142	Pernarava	299	232	Kaunas County	Kėdainiai District Municipality
143	Pikeliai	520	378	Telšiai County	Mažeikiai District Municipality
144	Pilviškiai	1,493	2,305	Marijampolė County	Vilkaviškis District Municipality
145	Plateliai	1,021	857	Telšiai County	Plungė District Municipality
146	Plikiai	607	607	Klaipėda County	Klaipėda District Municipality
147	Pociūnėliai	535	475	Šiauliai County	Radviliškis District Municipality
148	Pumpėnai	952	855	Panevėžys County	Pasvalys District Municipality
149	Pušalotas	885	692	Panevėžys County	Pasvalys District Municipality
150	Raguva	610	533	Panevėžys County	Panevėžys District Municipality
151	Raudonė	716	510	Tauragė County	Jurbarkas District Municipality
152	Rimšė	274	208	Utena County	Ignalina District Municipality
153	Rozalimas	928	746	Šiauliai County	Pakruojis District Municipality
154	Rudamina	296	256	Alytus County	Lazdijai District Municipality
155	Rukla	2,374	2,098	Kaunas County	Jonava District Municipality
156	Rumšiškės	1,833	1,651	Kaunas County	Kaišiadorys District Municipality
157	Rusnė	1,642	1,274	Klaipėda County	Šilutė District Municipality
158	Šakyna	425	382	Šiauliai County	Šiauliai District Municipality
	Salakas		519	Utena County	Zarasai District Municipality
159	Salamiestis	300	252	Panevėžys County	Kupiškis District Municipality
160	Saldutiškis	389	343	Utena County	Utena District Municipality
161	Saločiai	913	720	Panevėžys County	Pasvalys District Municipality
162	Salos	228	152	Panevėžys County	Rokiškis District Municipality
163	Sasnava	670	546	Marijampolė County	Marijampolė municipality
164	Šaukėnai	721	596	Šiauliai County	Kelmė District Municipality
165	Šaukotas	583	445	Šiauliai County	Radviliškis District Municipality
166	Seirijai	933	788	Alytus County	Lazdijai District Municipality
167	Semeliškės	660	580	Vilnius County	Elektrėnai municipality
168	Senasis Subačius	194	149	Panevėžys County	Kupiškis District Municipality
169	Seredžius	749	590	Tauragė County	Jurbarkas District Municipality
170	Šeštokai	755	686	Alytus County	Lazdijai District Municipality
171	Šešuoliai	189	138	Vilnius County	Ukmergė District Municipality
172	Šėta	1,025	935	Kaunas County	Kėdainiai District Municipality
173	Šiaulėnai	890	751	Šiauliai County	Radviliškis District Municipality
174	Sidabravas	610	532	Šiauliai County	Radviliškis District Municipality
175	Siesikai	601	508	Vilnius County	Ukmergė District Municipality
176	Šilai	298	252	Panevėžys County	Panevėžys District Municipality
177	Šiluva	800	635	Kaunas County	Raseiniai District Municipality
178	Šimkaičiai	265	204	Tauragė County	Jurbarkas District Municipality
179	Šimonys	505	441	Panevėžys County	Kupiškis District Municipality
180	Sintautai	586	520	Marijampolė County	Šakiai District Municipality
181	Skaistgirys	964	862	Šiauliai County	Joniškis District Municipality
182	Skapiškis	496	403	Panevėžys County	Kupiškis District Municipality
183	Skiemonys	92	38	Utena County	Anykščiai District Municipality
184	Smilgiai	652	544	Panevėžys County	Panevėžys District Municipality
185	Stakiai	241	170	Tauragė County	Jurbarkas District Municipality
186	Sudeikiai	407	349	Utena County	Utena District Municipality
187	Šumskas	998	919	Vilnius County	Vilnius District Municipality
188	Šunskai	524	468	Marijampolė County	Marijampolė municipality
189	Surdegis	244	158	Utena County	Anykščiai District Municipality
190	Surviliškis	376	351	Kaunas County	Kėdainiai District Municipality
191	Suvainiškis	245	175	Panevėžys County	Rokiškis District Municipality
192	Svėdasai	1,002	884	Utena County	Anykščiai District Municipality
193	Švėkšna	2,053	1,649	Klaipėda County	Šilutė District Municipality
194	Šventežeris	274	295	Alytus County	Lazdijai District Municipality
195	Taujėnai	322	365	Vilnius County	Ukmergė District Municipality
196	Tauragnai	602	473	Utena County	Utena District Municipality
197	Teneniai	369	330	Tauragė County	Šilalė District Municipality
198	Tirkšliai	1,626	1,507	Telšiai County	Mažeikiai District Municipality
199	Traupis	229	179	Utena County	Anykščiai District Municipality
200	Truskava	137	129	Kaunas County	Kėdainiai District Municipality
201	Tryškiai	1,555	1,352	Telšiai County	Telšiai District Municipality
202	Turmantas	397	286	Utena County	Zarasai District Municipality
203	Tverai	680	558	Telšiai County	Rietavas municipality
204	Tverečius	272	231	Utena County	Ignalina District Municipality
	Tyruliai		275	Šiauliai County	Radviliškis District Municipality
205	Ubiškė	215	187	Telšiai County	Telšiai District Municipality
206	Upyna	409	375	Tauragė County	Šilalė District Municipality
207	Užpaliai	877	758	Utena County	Utena District Municipality
208	Vadaktai	227	178	Šiauliai County	Radviliškis District Municipality
209	Vadokliai	651	519	Panevėžys County	Panevėžys District Municipality
210	Vadžgirys	505	440	Tauragė County	Jurbarkas District Municipality
211	Vainutas	993	746	Klaipėda County	Šilutė District Municipality
212	Valkininkai	238	229	Alytus County	Varėna District Municipality
213	Vandžiogala	946	861	Kaunas County	Kaunas District Municipality
214	Vaškai	688	568	Panevėžys County	Pasvalys District Municipality
215	Veiveriai	1,100	1,167	Kaunas County	Prienai District Municipality
216	Veiviržėnai	964	840	Klaipėda County	Klaipėda District Municipality
217	Veliuona	883	726	Tauragė County	Jurbarkas District Municipality
218	Vepriai	663	549	Vilnius County	Ukmergė District Municipality
219	Vėžaičiai	1,749	1,646	Klaipėda County	Klaipėda District Municipality
220	Vidiškiai	528	427	Vilnius County	Ukmergė District Municipality
221	Viduklė	1,911	1,678	Kaunas County	Raseiniai District Municipality
222	Viešintos	383	281	Utena County	Anykščiai District Municipality
223	Viešvilė	1,045	843	Tauragė County	Jurbarkas District Municipality
224	Vilkyškiai	883	666	Tauragė County	Pagėgiai municipality
225	Vištytis	566	436	Marijampolė County	Vilkaviškis District Municipality
226	Vyžuonos	581	512	Utena County	Utena District Municipality
227	Ylakiai	1,165	950	Klaipėda County	Skuodas District Municipality
228	Žaiginys	380	335	Kaunas County	Raseiniai District Municipality
229	Žalpiai	125	106	Šiauliai County	Kelmė District Municipality
230	Zapyškis	254	264	Kaunas County	Kaunas District Municipality
231	Žarėnai	588	499	Telšiai County	Telšiai District Municipality
232	Žasliai	818	644	Kaunas County	Kaišiadorys District Municipality
233	Žeimelis	1,216	953	Šiauliai County	Pakruojis District Municipality
234	Žeimiai	962	860	Kaunas County	Jonava District Municipality
235	Želva	516	457	Vilnius County	Ukmergė District Municipality
236	Žemaičių Kalvarija	798	696	Telšiai County	Plungė District Municipality
237	Žemaičių Naumiestis	1,716	1,373	Klaipėda County	Šilutė District Municipality
238	Žemaitkiemis	313	261	Vilnius County	Ukmergė District Municipality
239	Žemoji Panemunė	106	64	Marijampolė County	Šakiai District Municipality
240	Zibalai	165	129	Vilnius County	Širvintos District Municipality
241	Židikai	524	440	Telšiai County	Mažeikiai District Municipality
242	Žvingiai	231	195	Tauragė County	Šilalė District Municipality
243	Žvirgždaičiai	248	242	Marijampolė County	Šakiai District Municipality
244	Žygaičiai	643	542	Tauragė County	Tauragė District Municipality

== See also ==
- List of cities in Lithuania (Lithuanian: plural – miestai, singular – miestas)
- List of Lithuanian towns in other languages
- Administrative divisions of Lithuania
- Counties (Lithuanian: singular – apskritis, plural – apskritys)
- Municipalities (Lithuanian: plural – savivaldybės, singular – savivaldybė)
- Elderships (or wards) (eldership, ward) (Lithuanian: plural – seniūnijos, singular – seniūnija).
- Seniūnaitija (sub-eldership)
