= Žalpiai =

- Town
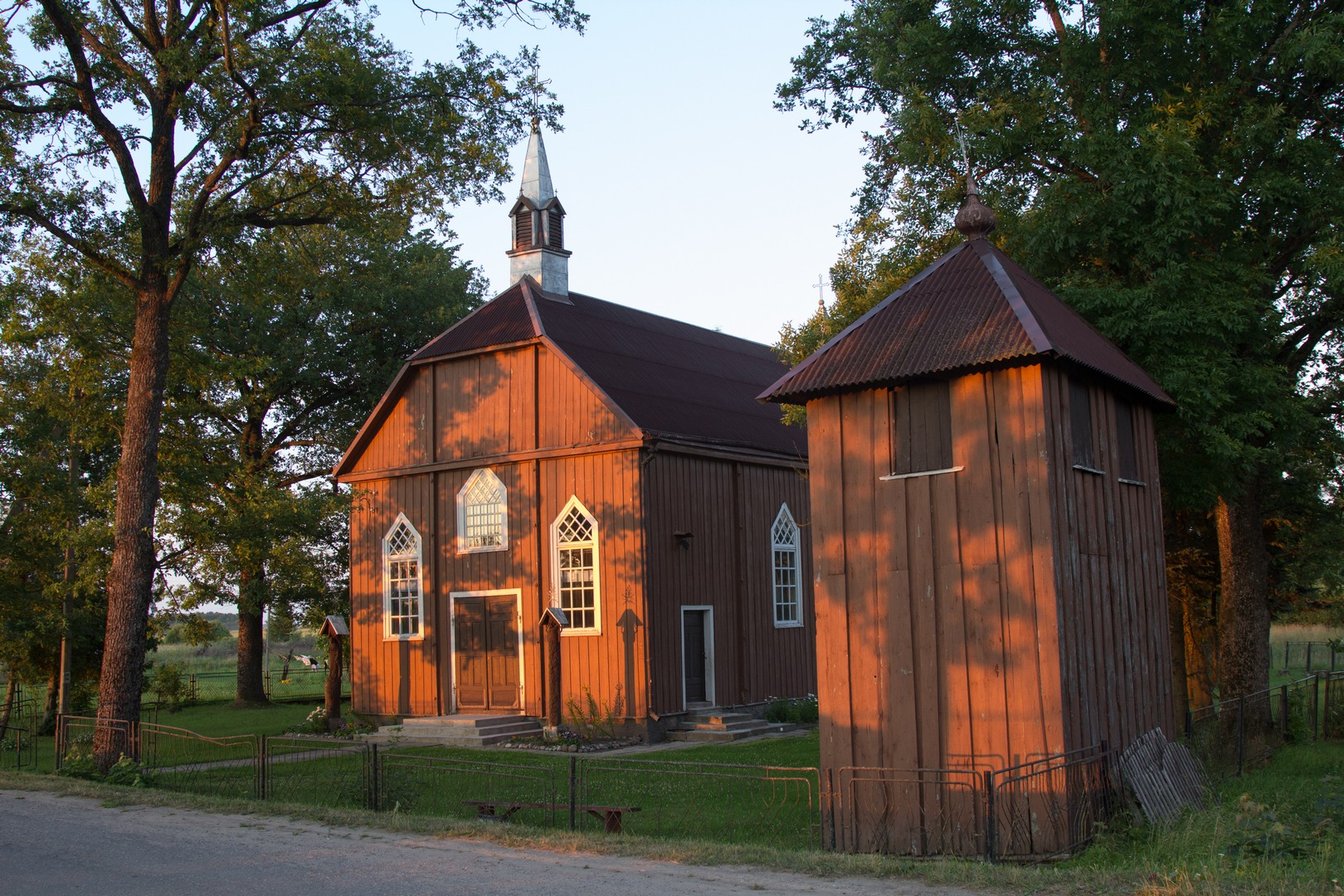

- Location in Lithuania
- Coordinates: 55°29′0″N 22°51′40″E
- Country: Lithuania
- Ethnographic region: Samogitia
- County: Šiauliai County

Population (2021)
  - Total: 167
- Time zone: UTC+2 (EET)
  - Summer (DST): UTC+3 (EEST)

Žalpiai is a small town in Kelmė District Municipality, in Šiauliai County in northern-central Lithuania. A tributary of the Šešuvis River flows through the town.

== Geography and location ==
Žalpiai lies in the territory of the Kelmė District Municipality, in Šiauliai County, 17 kilometres south of Kelmė. The Žalpė River, a right tributary of the Šešuvis River, flows through the town.

== Demographics ==
Population records show that based on the 1923 Lithuanian census, the village of Žalpiai had 15 residents while the manor housed 81. The population gradually increased through the decades, reaching 101 in 1959, 121 in 1970, and peaking at 202 in 1989. By the 2011 Lithuanian census, the town had a population of 106 people. A decade later, the 2021 Lithuanian census, showed the population had grown to 167 residents, reflecting an annual population increase of approximately 4.8% over the decade. The town covers an area of 2.227 square kilometers, resulting in a population density of about 74.98 people per square kilometer as of 2021. In terms of gender distribution, the 2021 census recorded 75 males (44.9%) and 92 females (55.1%) living in Žalpiai. The settlement is situated at an elevation of 122 meters above sea level.

== History ==
Žalpiai was first mentioned in historical records in 1561. From 1600 to 1721, the town belonged to the Raseiniai Evangelical Reformed Church. By the second half of the 18th century, the Žalpiai manor came into prominence. In the early 19th century, a chapel was constructed and a dairy was established later in 1889.

Following the restoration of Lithuania's independence in 1918 after the Act of Independence, a local riflemen's squad used the town as a base. During the post-World War II period, Lithuanian partisans from the Kęstutis military district operated in the surrounding area, and on 8 December, 1945, took control of the nearby Lioliai.

== Damage on July 13th ==
On July 13th, 2024 at 1:00pm EET, NW of Žalpiai, an IF2 ranked multi-vortex tornado hit the town. The tornado tore sturdy roofs off of buildings and snapped masonry electrical poles. This would be one of the 3 tornadoes hitting Šiauliai, as part of the 2024 Šiauliai tornado outbreak.
