= Jure =

Jure may refer to:

- De jure, Latin legal phrase
- Jure (given name), Slavic masculine name
- Jūrė (disambiguation), several places in Lithuania
- Juré (music), a music genre from Louisiana
