= Tytuvėnai Eldership =

Eldership of Lithuania

The Tytuvėnai Eldership (Lithuanian: Tytuvėnų seniūnija) is an eldership of Lithuania, located in the Kelmė District Municipality. It encompasses the city of Tytuvėnai, which is the only settelemt in the eldership. In 2021 its population was 1850.

== Sub-elderships ==
The eldership is subdivided into the following sub-elderships (seniūnaitija): Centro, Pušyno, and Durpyno.
