= Šeduva Eldership =

Eldership of Lithuania

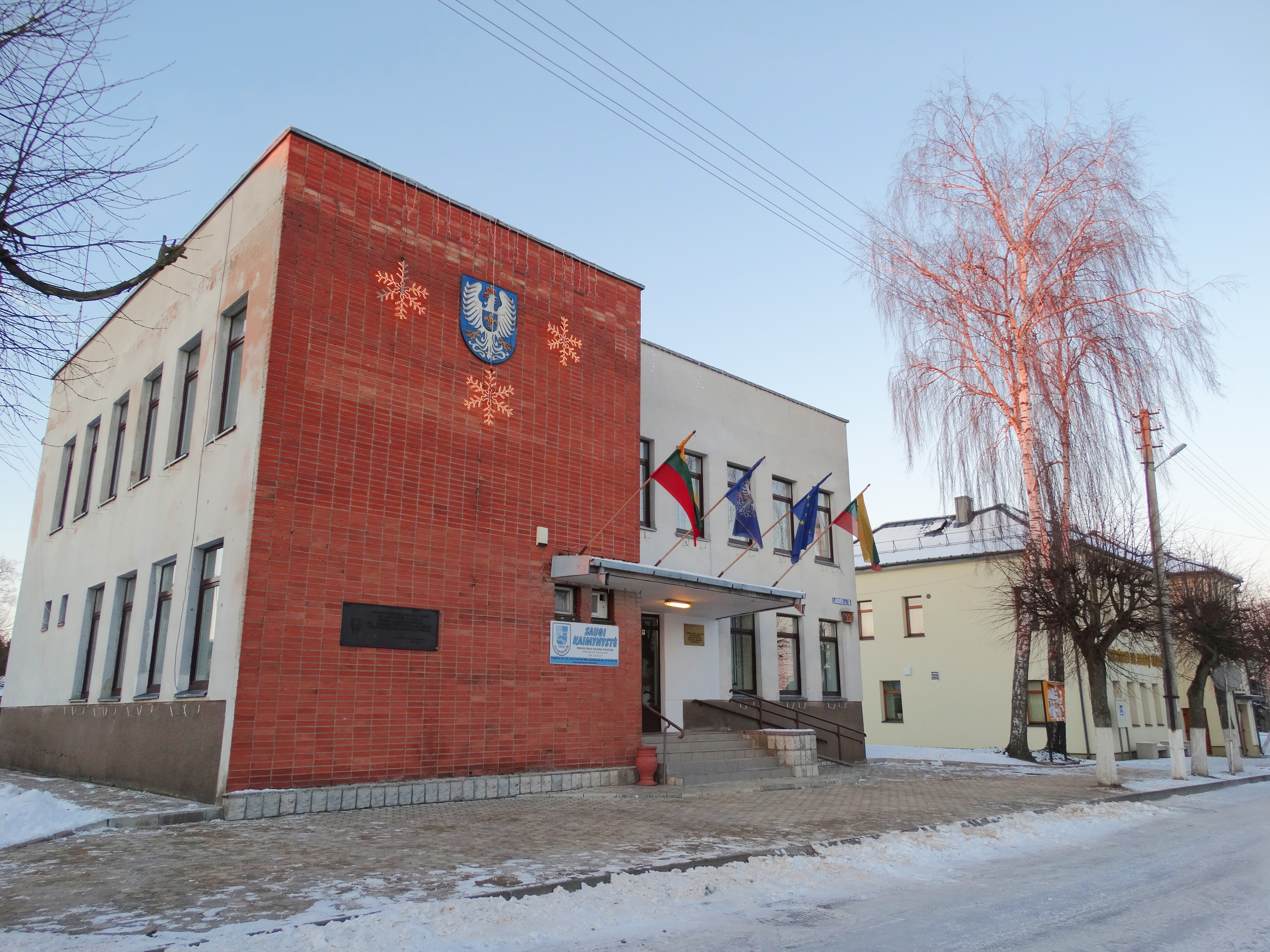
Eldership, Šeduva, Lithuania

The Šeduva Eldership (Lithuanian: Šeduvos seniūnija) is an eldership of Lithuania, located in the Radviliškis District Municipality. In 2021 its population was 3963.

The old Šeduva eldership was mentioned in the 2nd half of the 16th century.

The 20th century eldership was established in 1995 on the site of the Šeduva district. By the resolution of the municipal council of May 21, 2009 No. T-689, the Šeduva eldership was annexed to the Šeduva city eldership on July 1, 2009.
