= Gudeliai Eldership =

Eldership of Lithuania

The Gudeliai Eldership (Lithuanian: Gudelių seniūnija) is an eldership of Lithuania, located in the Marijampolė Municipality. Capital: Gudeliai. In 2021 its population was 726.
