= Šiaulėnai Eldership =

Eldership of Lithuania

The Šiaulėnai Eldership (Lithuanian: Šiaulėnų seniūnija) is an eldership of Lithuania, located in the Radviliškis District Municipality. In 2021 its population was 1166.

The area of the municipality is 199 km². The center of the municipality is Šiaulėnai ale (in 2011, there were 751 inhabitants), the address of the municipal hall is Dvaro g. 2. The mayor is Ieva Bliznikienė.
