= Šimonys =

- Town
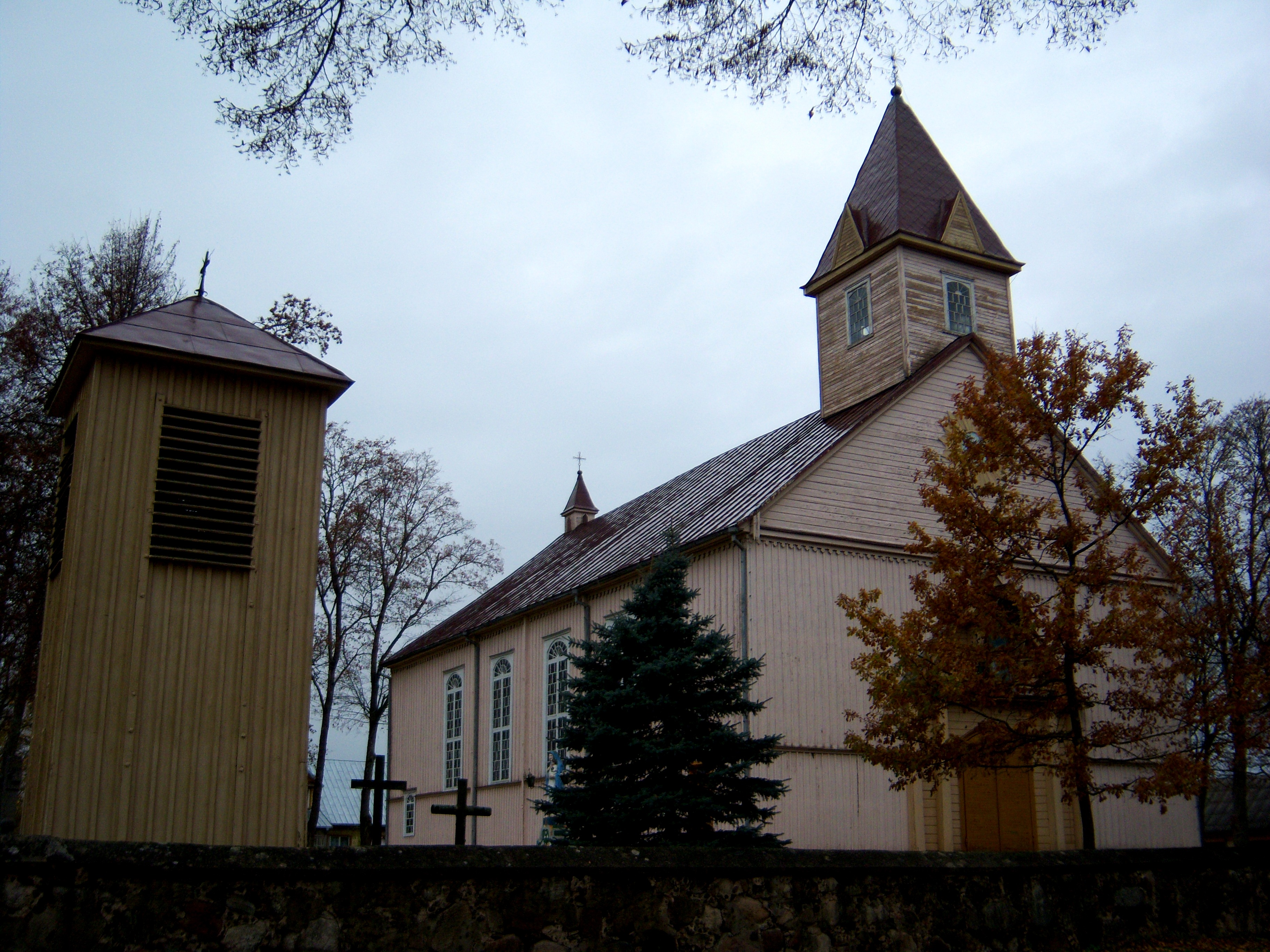

- Location within Lithuania
- Coordinates: 55°44′20″N 25°08′40″E
- Country: Lithuania
- County: Panevėžys County

Population (2011)
  - Total: 441
- Time zone: UTC+2 (EET)
  - Summer (DST): UTC+3 (EEST)

Šimonys is a small town in Panevėžys County, in northeastern Lithuania. According to the 2011 census, the town has a population of 441 people.
