= Pakalniškiai Eldership =

Eldership of Lithuania

The Pakalniškiai Eldership (Lithuanian: Pakalniškių seniūnija) is an eldership of Lithuania, located in the Radviliškis District Municipality. In 2021 its population was 1981.
