= Janapolė =

- Town
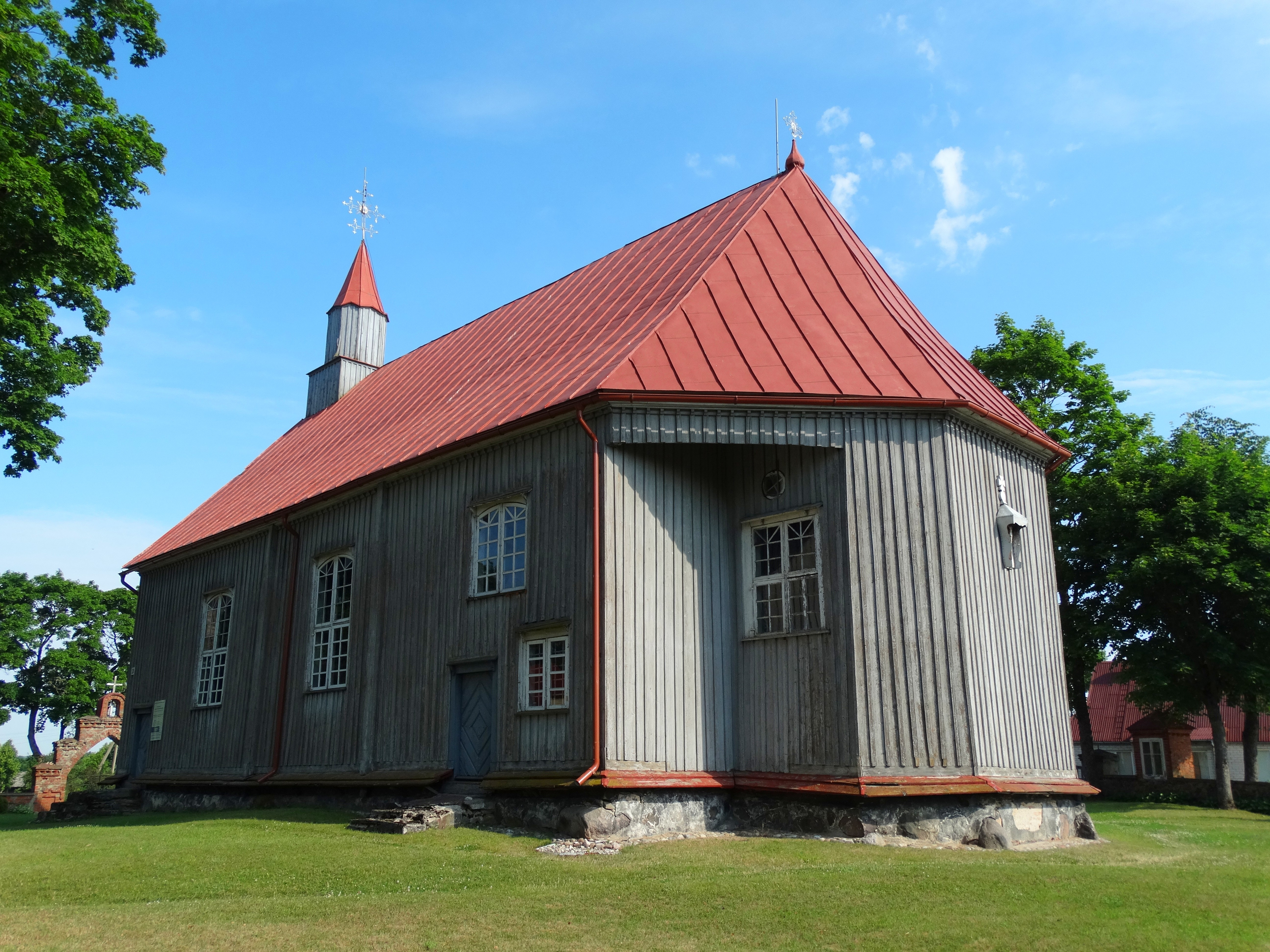
- St. Michael the Archangel church

- Location within Lithuania
- Coordinates: 55°48′50″N 22°22′59″E
- Country: Lithuania
- County: Telšiai County
- Municipality: Telšiai district municipality
- Eldership: Varniai eldership
- Named for: Jan Dominik Łopaciński

Population (2011)
  - Total: 341
- Time zone: UTC+2 (EET)
  - Summer (DST): UTC+3 (EEST)

Janapolė (Samogitian: Janapuolė, Polish: Janopol) is a town in Telšiai County, in western Lithuania. According to the 2011 census, the town has a population of 341 people.

The town is named after its benefactor, Jan Dominik Łopaciński, Catholic Bishop of Samogitia.
