= Pašušvys =

- Town
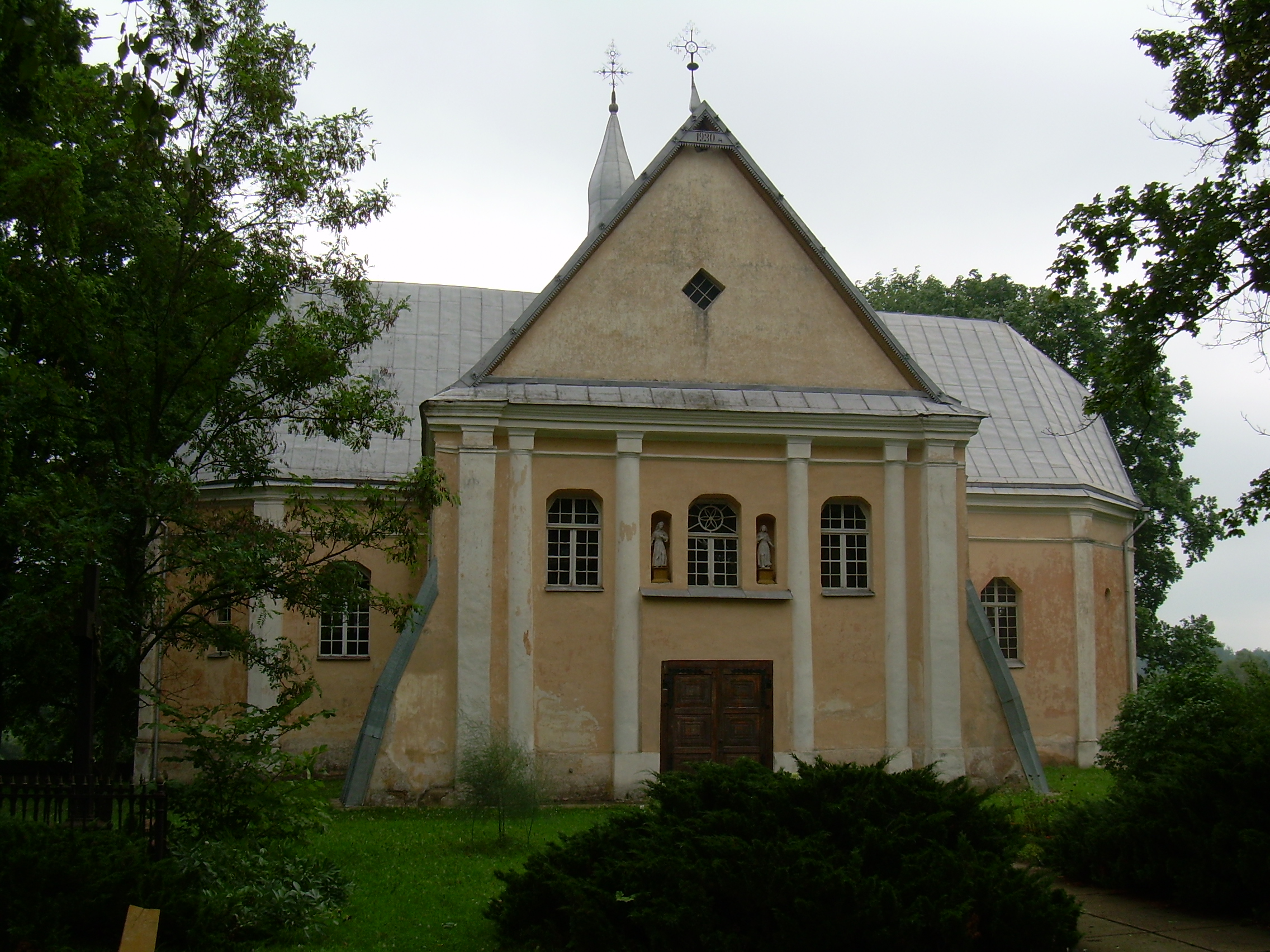

- Location in Lithuania
- Coordinates: 55°35′0″N 23°35′30″E
- Country: Lithuania
- Ethnographic region: Samogitia
- County: Šiauliai County

Population (2011)
  - Total: 331
- Time zone: UTC+2 (EET)
  - Summer (DST): UTC+3 (EEST)

Pašušvys is a small town in Šiauliai County in northern-central Lithuania. As of 2011 it had a population of 331.
