= Krikliniai =

- Town
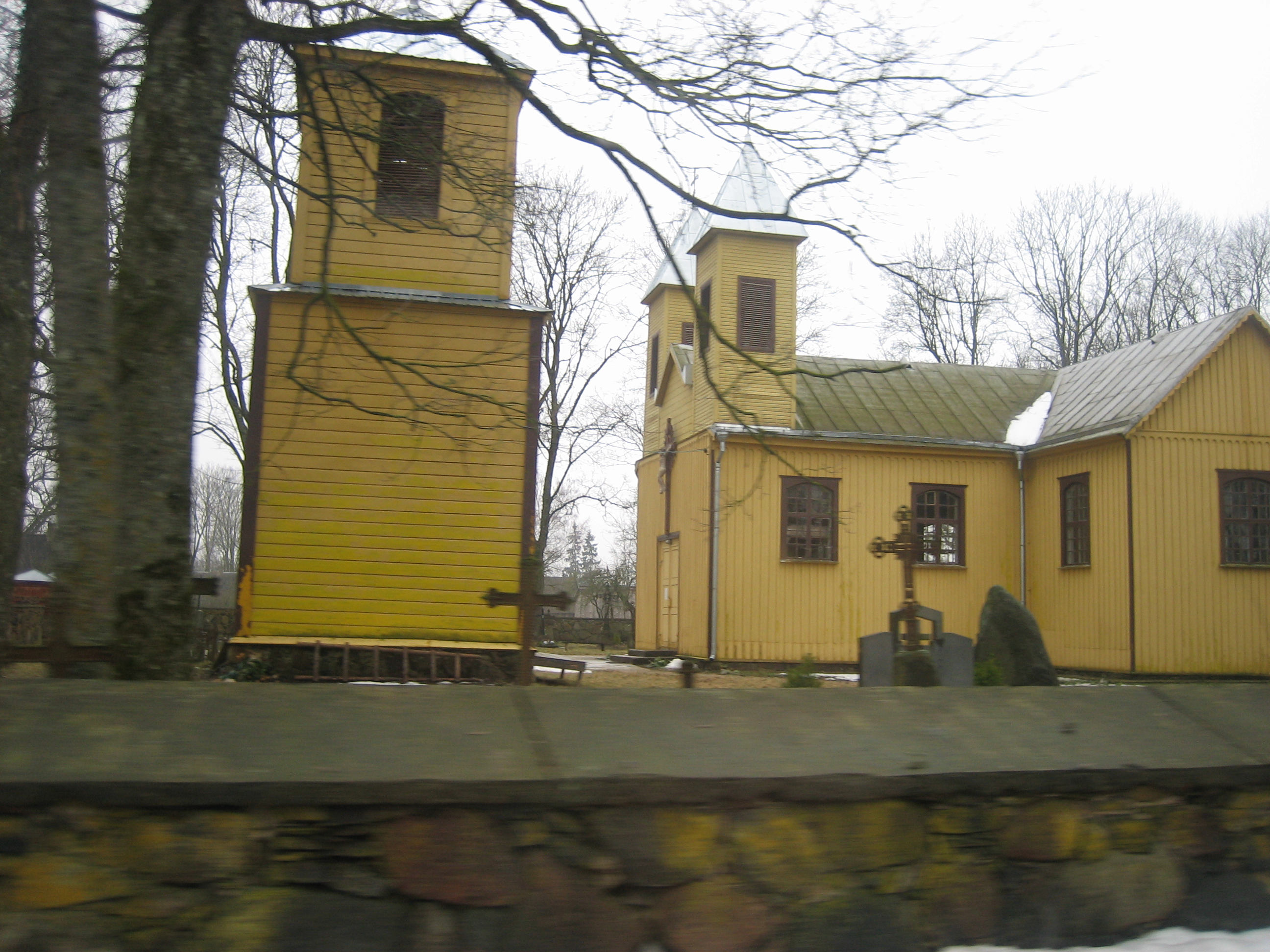

- Location within Lithuania
- Coordinates: 55°55′0″N 24°27′0″E
- Country: Lithuania
- County: Panevėžys County

Population (2011)
  - Total: 228
- Time zone: UTC+2 (EET)
  - Summer (DST): UTC+3 (EEST)
- Website: www.krikliniai.lt

Krikliniai (Polish: Kryklany) is a small town in Panevėžys County, in northeastern Lithuania. According to the 2021 census, the town has a population of 205 people.
