= Gudeliai =

- Town
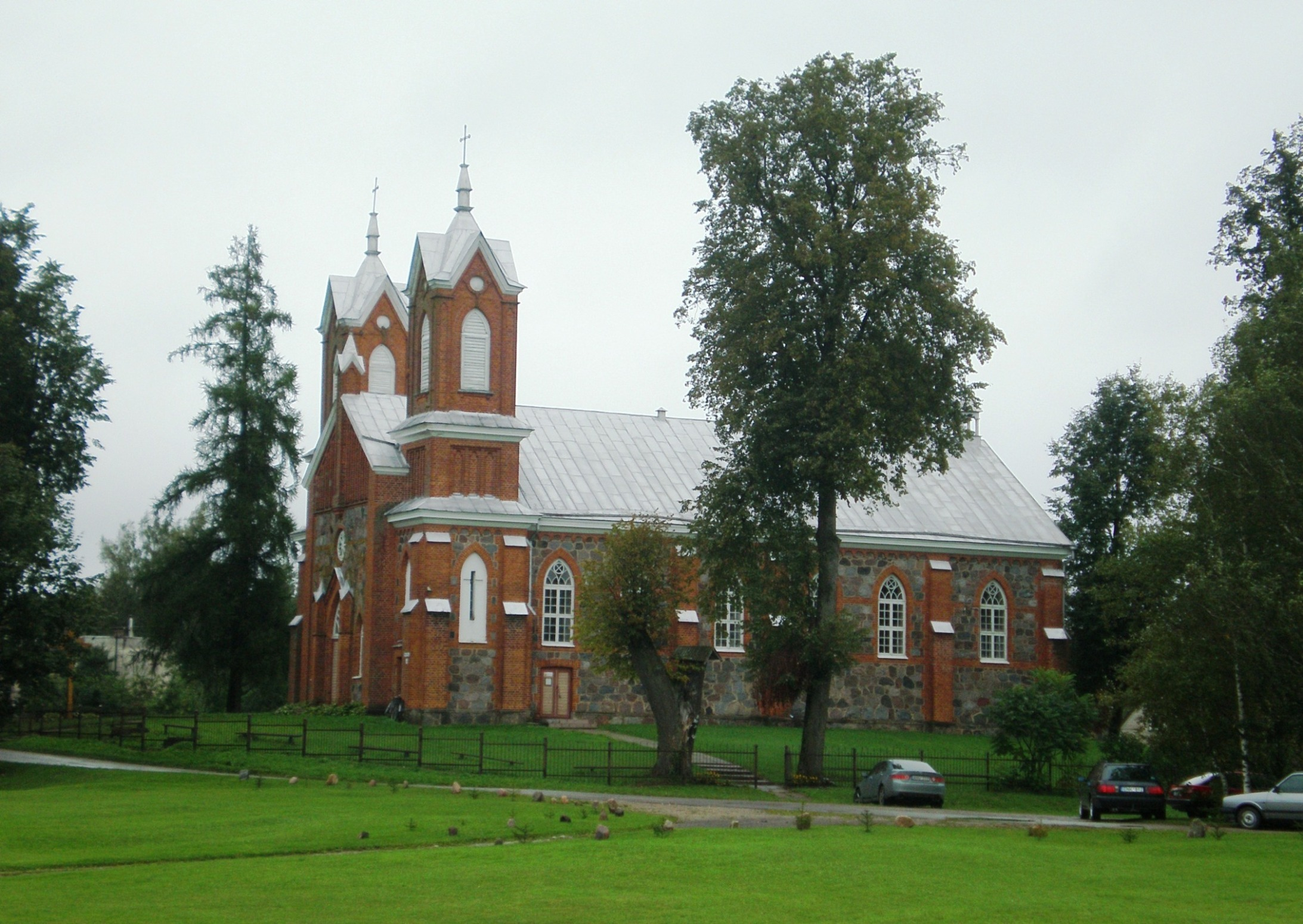

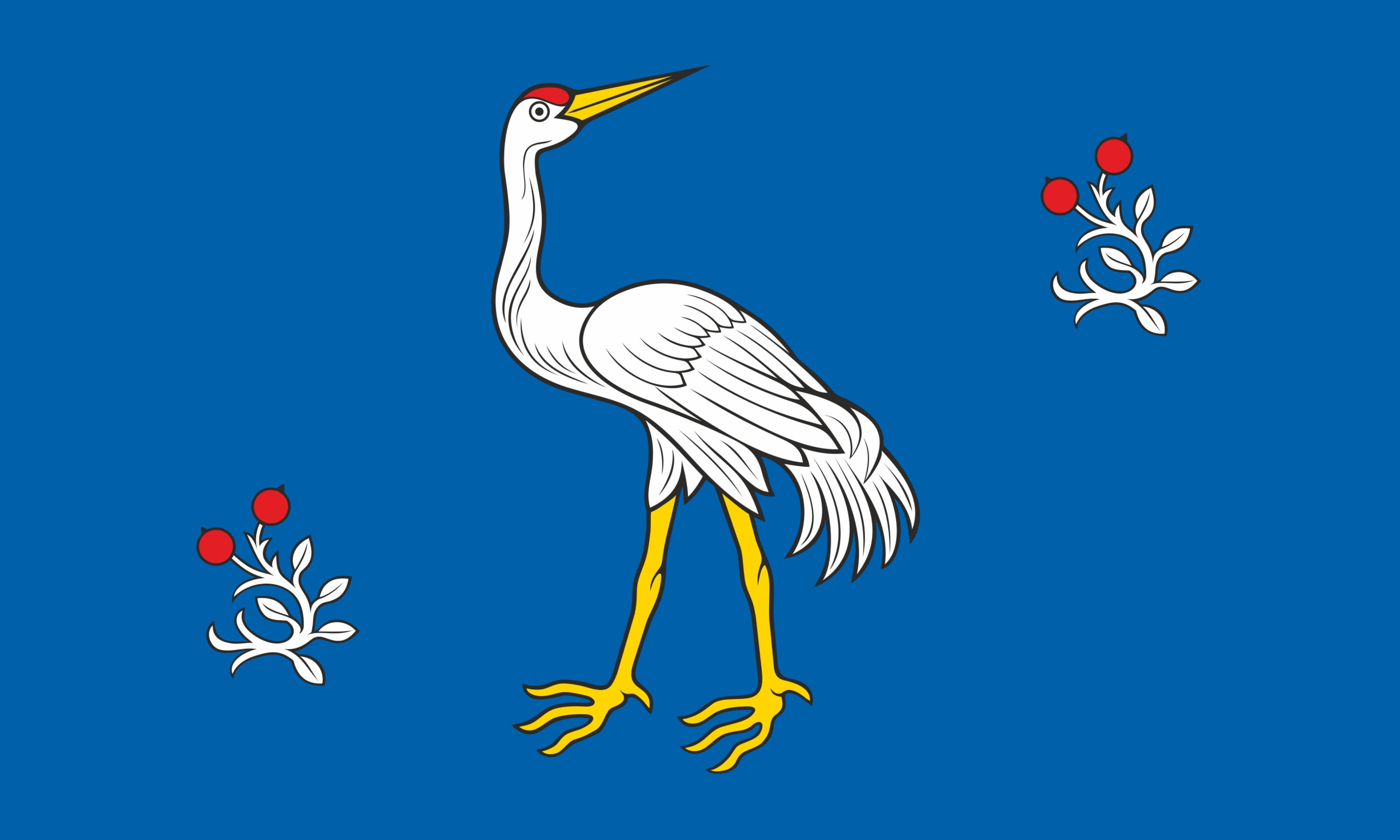
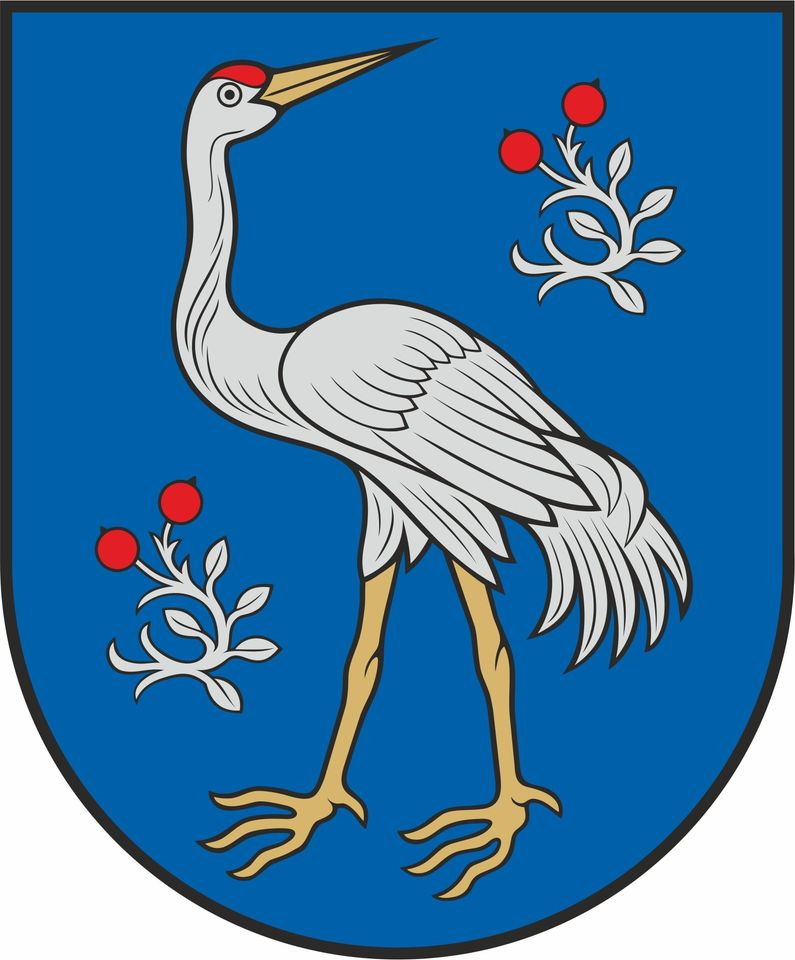
- Flag Coat of arms

- Location within Lithuania
- Coordinates: 54°31′40″N 23°41′10″E
- Country: Lithuania
- County: Marijampolė County

Population (2011)
  - Total: 340
- Time zone: UTC+2 (EET)
  - Summer (DST): UTC+3 (EEST)

Gudeliai is a small town (miestelis) in Marijampolė County, in southwestern Lithuania. According to the 2011 census, the town has a population of 340 people.
