= Karklėnai =

- Town
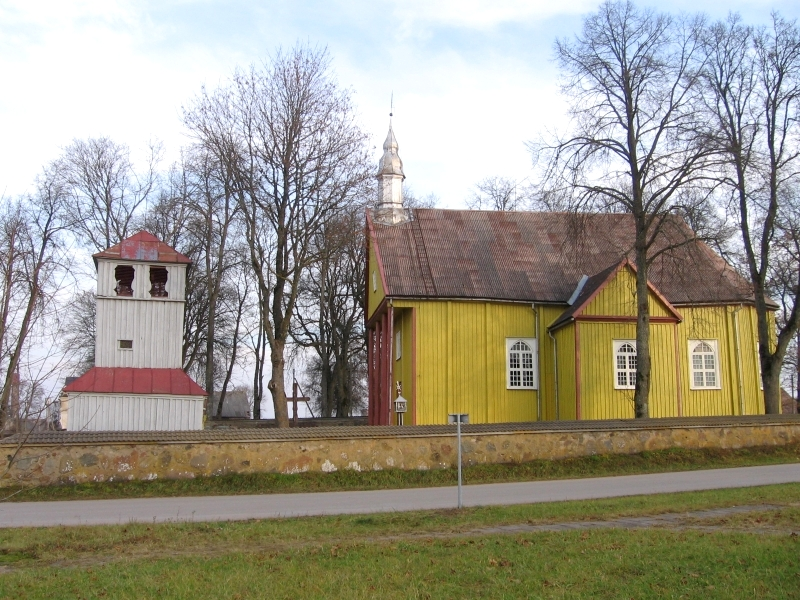

- Location in Lithuania
- Coordinates: 55°39′20″N 22°34′10″E
- Country: Lithuania
- Ethnographic region: Samogitia
- County: Šiauliai County

Population (2011)
  - Total: 285
- Time zone: UTC+2 (EET)
  - Summer (DST): UTC+3 (EEST)

Karklėnai (Samogitian: Karklienā) is a small town in Šiauliai County in northern-central Lithuania. In 2011 it had a population of 285.
