= Pavandenė =

- Town
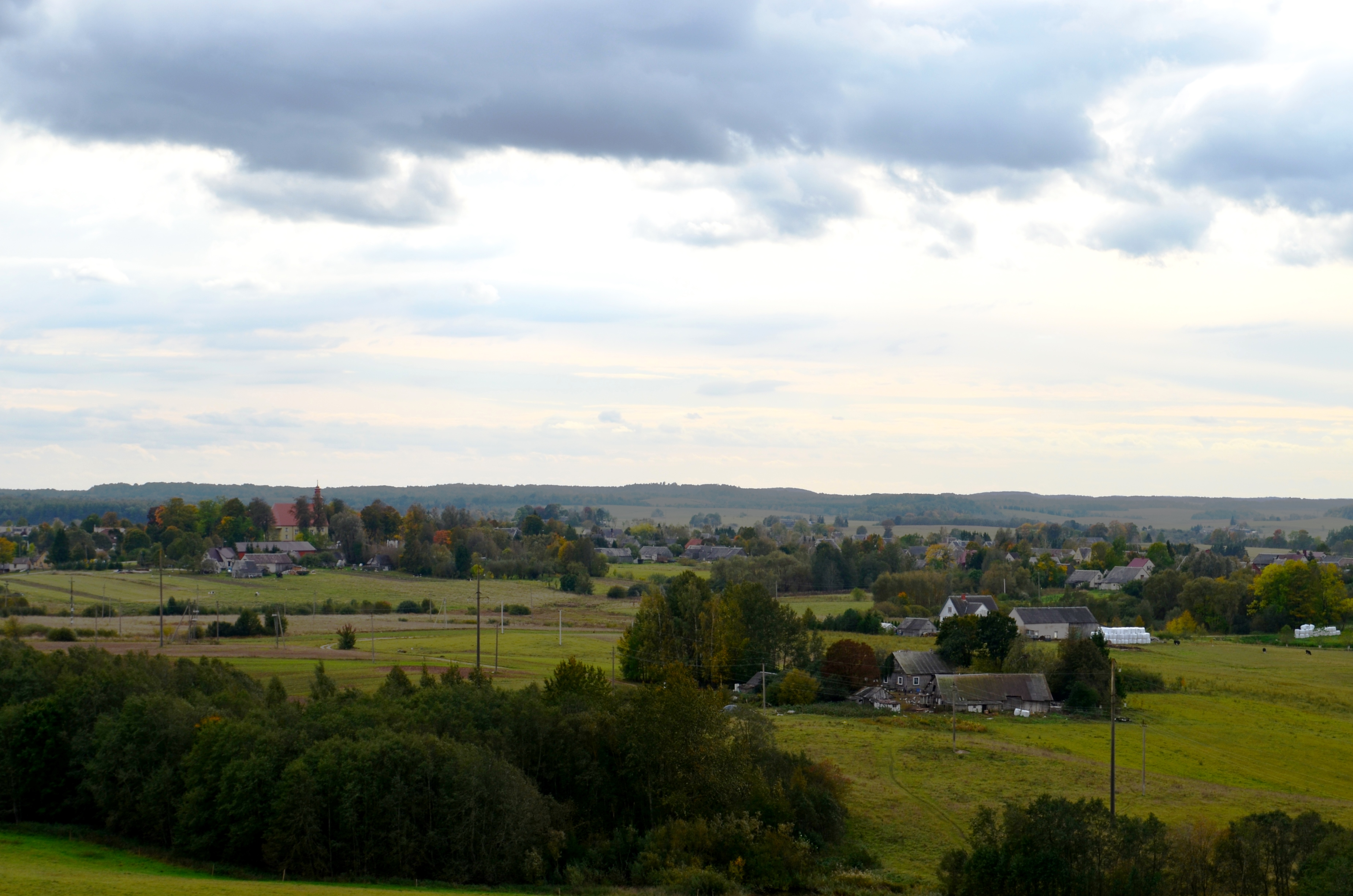
- Pavandenė skyline

- Location within Lithuania
- Coordinates: 55°46′8″N 22°29′10″E
- Country: Lithuania
- County: Telšiai County
- Municipality: Telšiai district municipality
- Eldership: Varniai eldership

Population (2011)
  - Total: 317
- Time zone: UTC+2 (EET)
  - Summer (DST): UTC+3 (EEST)

Pavandenė (Samogitian: Pavondenė) is a town in Telšiai County, Lithuania. According to the 2011 census, the town has a population of 317 people.

== History ==
The settlement dates back to the 14th century. It is known from 1596 that there was a manor in Pavandenė. The owner of the manor, Jonas Burba Gervydas, shared his possession between his five sons, the village itself being the property of two - Stanislovas and Mykolas.

In 1773, the settlement went to Bouffal. Later, the settlement was owned by Danilevičiai and Sakeliai. During the uprising of 1831, the insurgents of Pavandenė formed a military unit.
