= Gadūnavas =

- Town
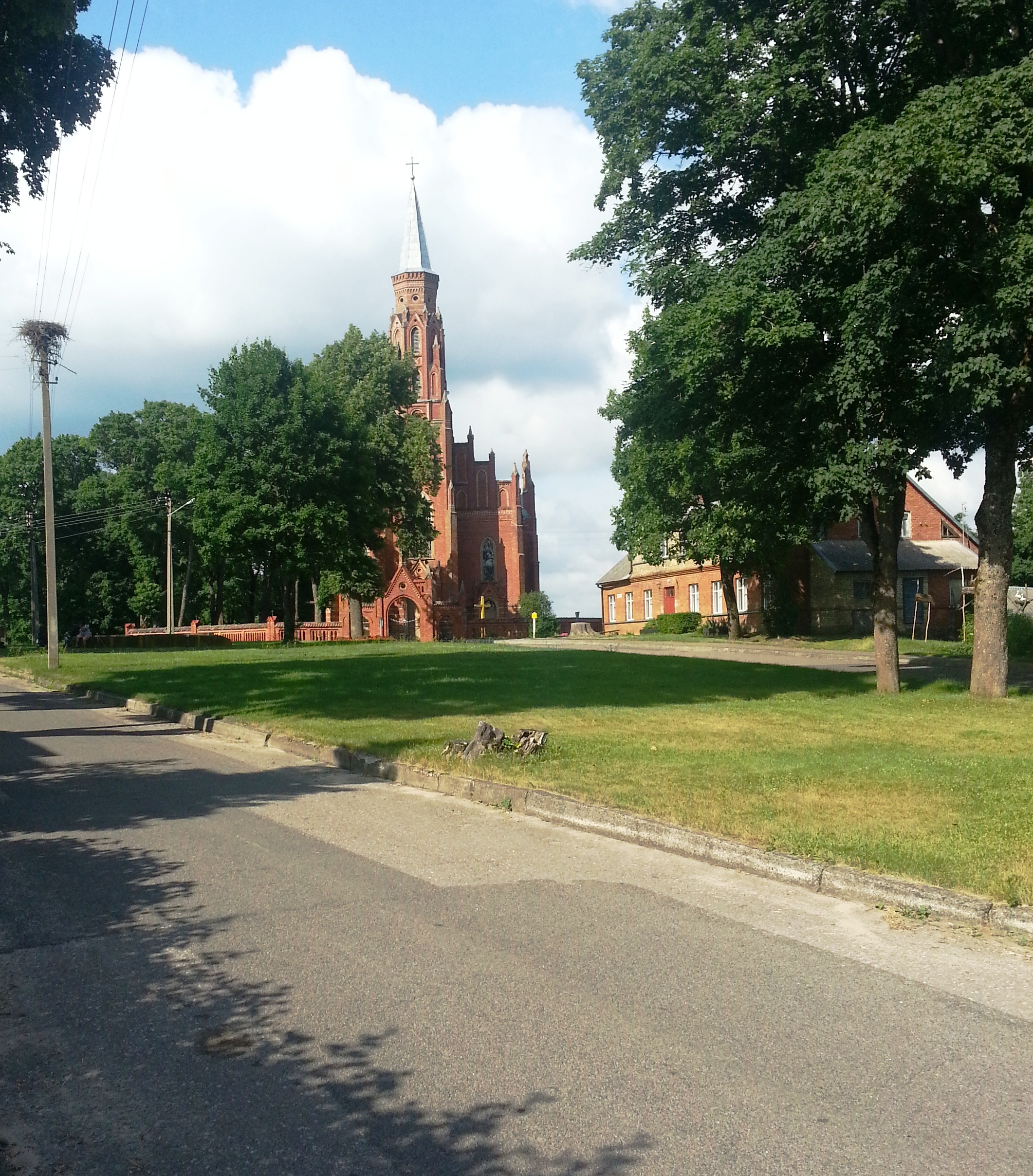

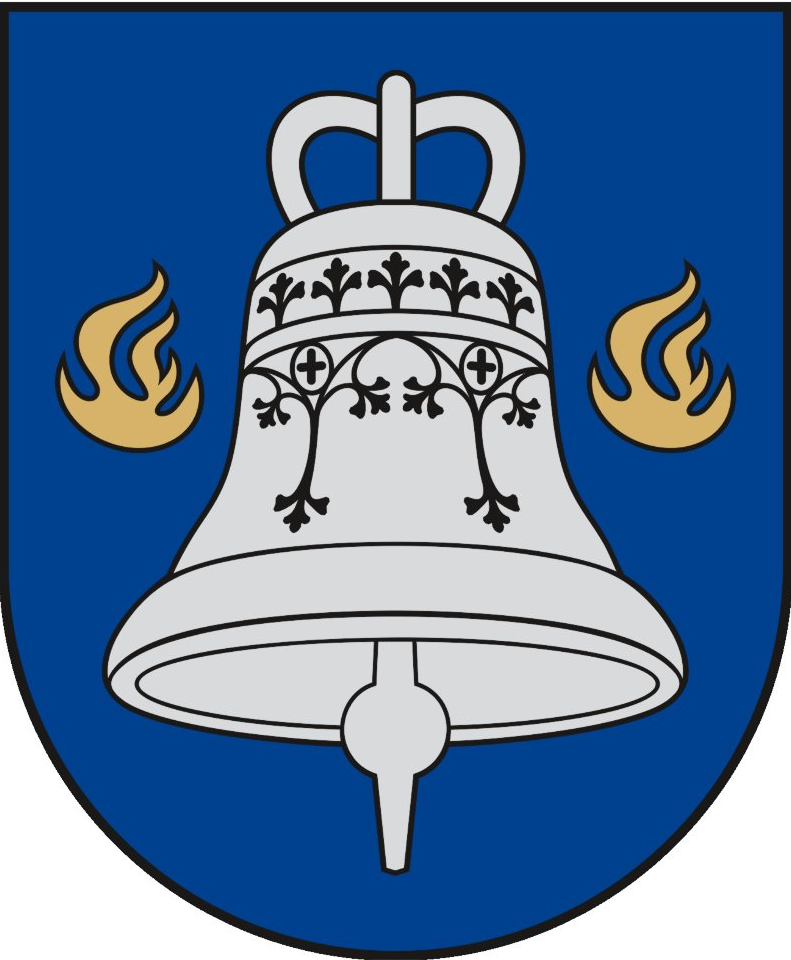
- Coat of arms

- Location within Lithuania
- Coordinates: 56°3′50″N 22°12′40″E
- Country: Lithuania
- County: Telšiai County
- Municipality: Telšiai district municipality
- Eldership: Gadūnavas eldership

Population (2011)
  - Total: 98
- Time zone: UTC+2 (EET)
  - Summer (DST): UTC+3 (EEST)

Gadūnavas (Samogitian: Gadūnavs, Polish: Gadonów) is a town in Telšiai County, Lithuania. According to the 2011 census, the town has a population of 98 people.
