= Kriūkai =

- Town
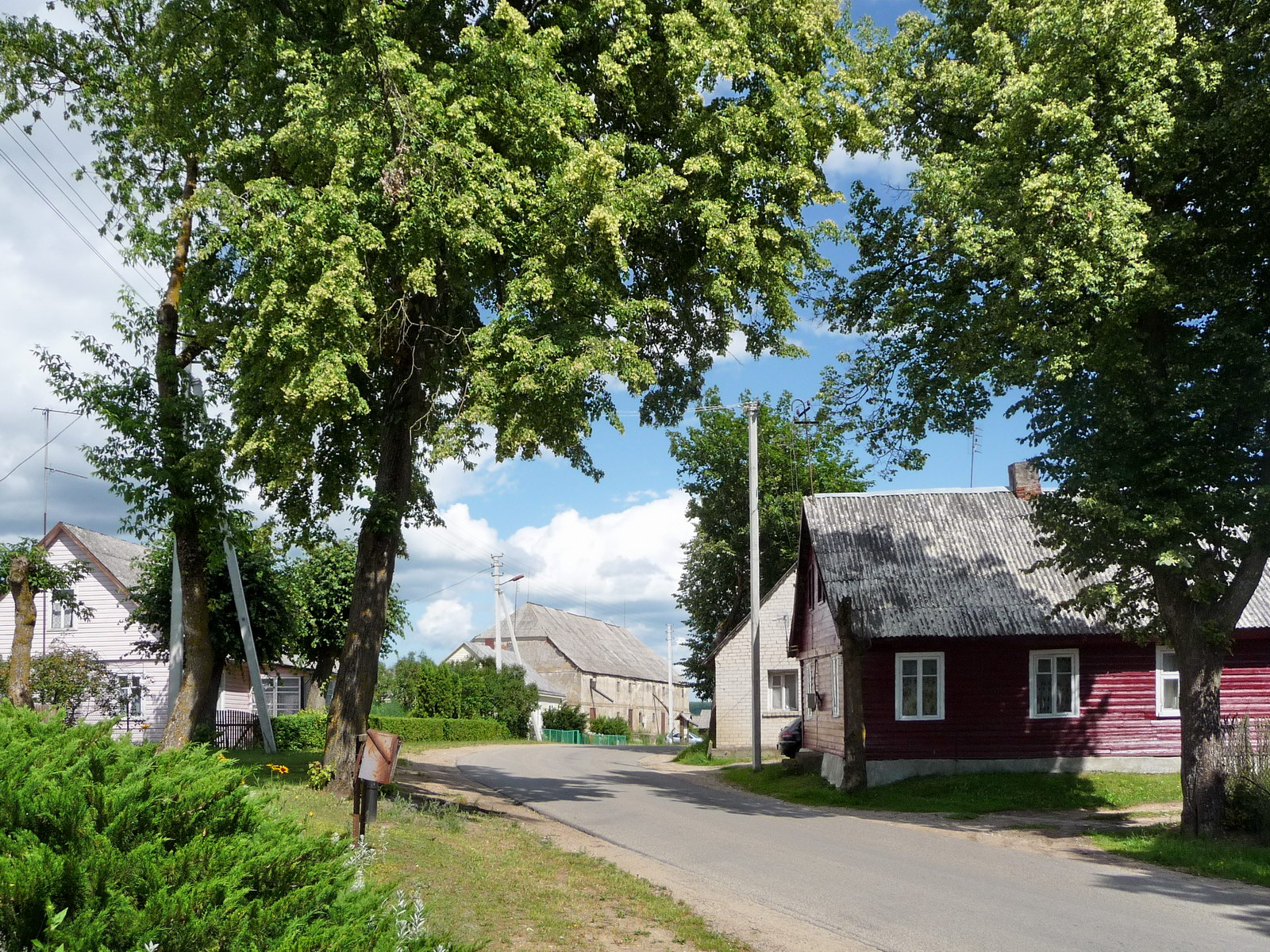
- Nemuno street

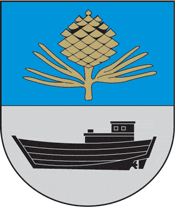
- Seal

- Location within Lithuania
- Coordinates: 55°03′50″N 23°23′50″E
- Country: Lithuania
- County: Marijampolė County

Population (2011)
  - Total: 291
- Time zone: UTC+2 (EET)
  - Summer (DST): UTC+3 (EEST)

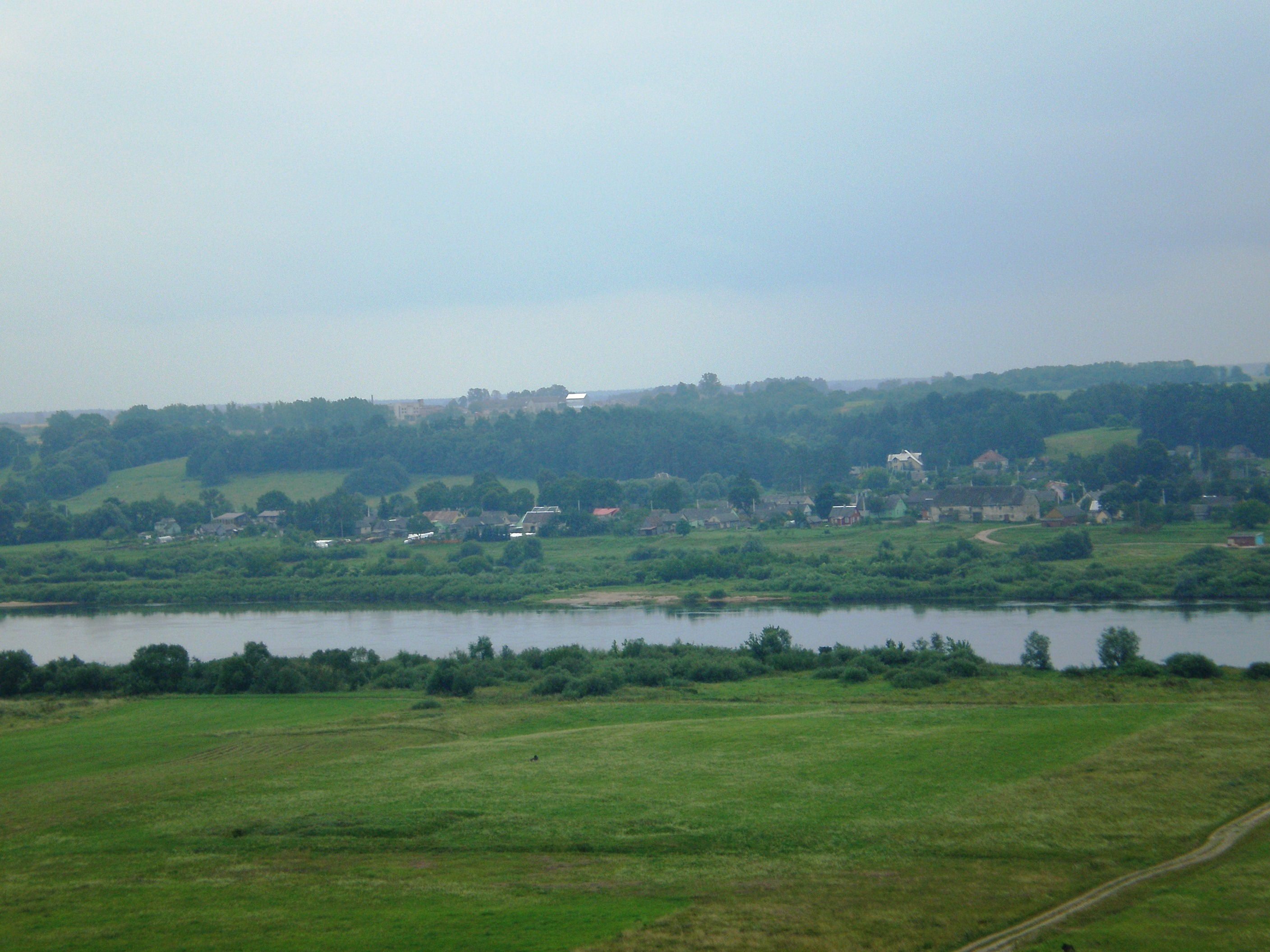
Kriūkai panorama

Kriūkai is a small town in Marijampolė County in south-central Lithuania. According to the 2011 census, the town has a population of 291 people.
