= Tyruliai =

- Town
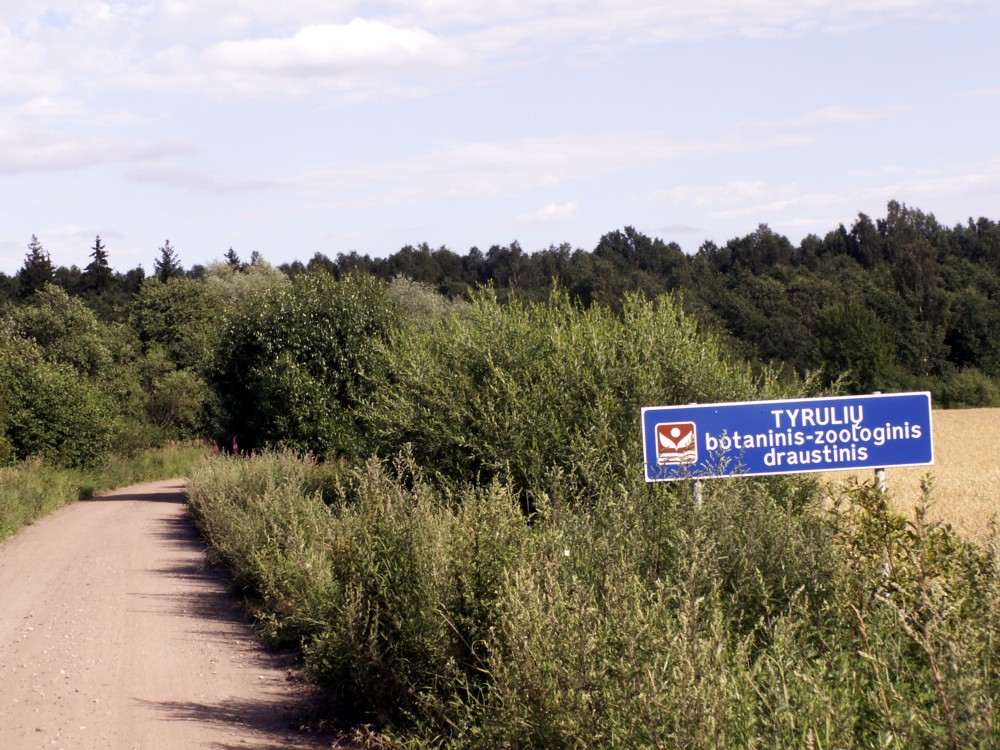
- Tyruliai botanical and zoological reserve

- Location of Tyruliai
- Coordinates: 55°46′N 23°20′E
- Country: Lithuania
- County: Šiauliai County
- Municipality: Radviliškis district municipality
- Eldership: Tyruliai eldership
- Capital of: Tyruliai eldership

Population (2021)
  - Total: 207
- Time zone: UTC+2 (EET)
  - Summer (DST): UTC+3 (EEST)

Tyruliai is a town in the Radviliškis district municipality in north central Lithuania. According to the 2011 census, it had a population of 275.
