= Jūrė (disambiguation) =

Jūrė may refer to several places in Lithuania:

- Jūrė, town in Lithuania
- Jūrė railway station within the town of Jūrė
- Jūrė (village), village in Lithuania
- Jūrė (river), river in Lithuania
- Jūrė reservoir, reservoir in Lithuania
