= 2001 Lithuanian census =

The 2001 Lithuania Census was carried out during April 6 - April 16 by the Lithuanian Department of Statistics. The results were published in 2002.

At the period of the census the country was subdivided as follows:

- 10 counties
- 60 municipalities
- 106 cities
- 464 rural elderships
- 21,500 rural settlements

Total population was 3,483,972, of which 2,332,098 were urban dwellers and 1,151,874 were rural dwellers.

== See also ==
- Demographics of Lithuania
- 2011 Lithuanian census
- 2021 Lithuanian census
