= Bagaslaviškis =

- Town
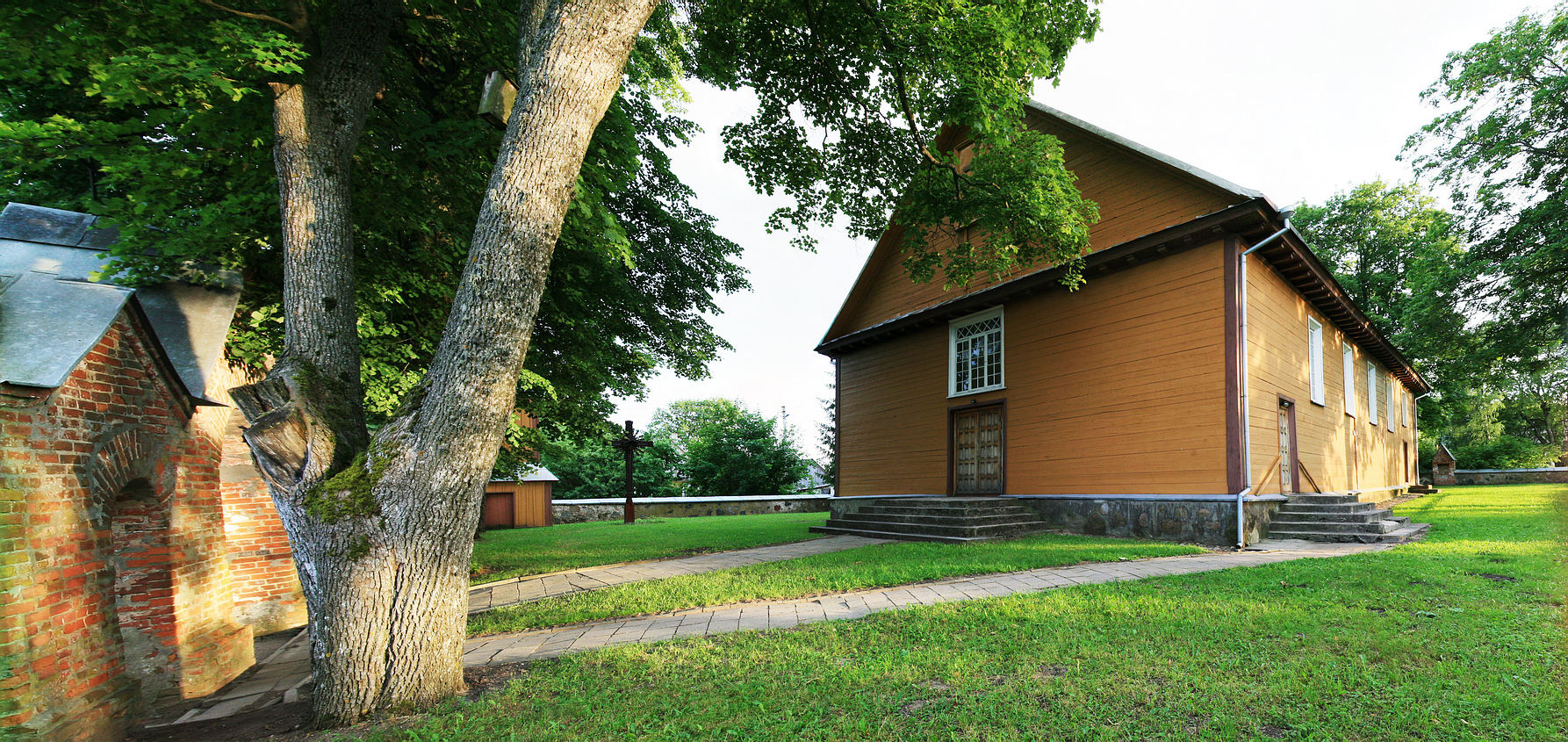

- Location of Bagaslaviškis
- Coordinates: 55°04′19″N 24°46′01″E
- Country: Lithuania
- County: Vilnius County
- Municipality: Širvintos district municipality
- Eldership: Galvonai eldership

Population (2011)
  - Total: 110
- Time zone: UTC+2 (EET)
  - Summer (DST): UTC+3 (EEST)

Bagaslaviškis is a town in Širvintos district municipality, Vilnius County, east Lithuania. According to the Lithuanian census of 2011, the town had a population of 110 people. The town has a church of Catholics.

== Famous citizens ==
- Rimantas Didžiokas, Lithuanian transport minister.
