= Palonai =

- Town
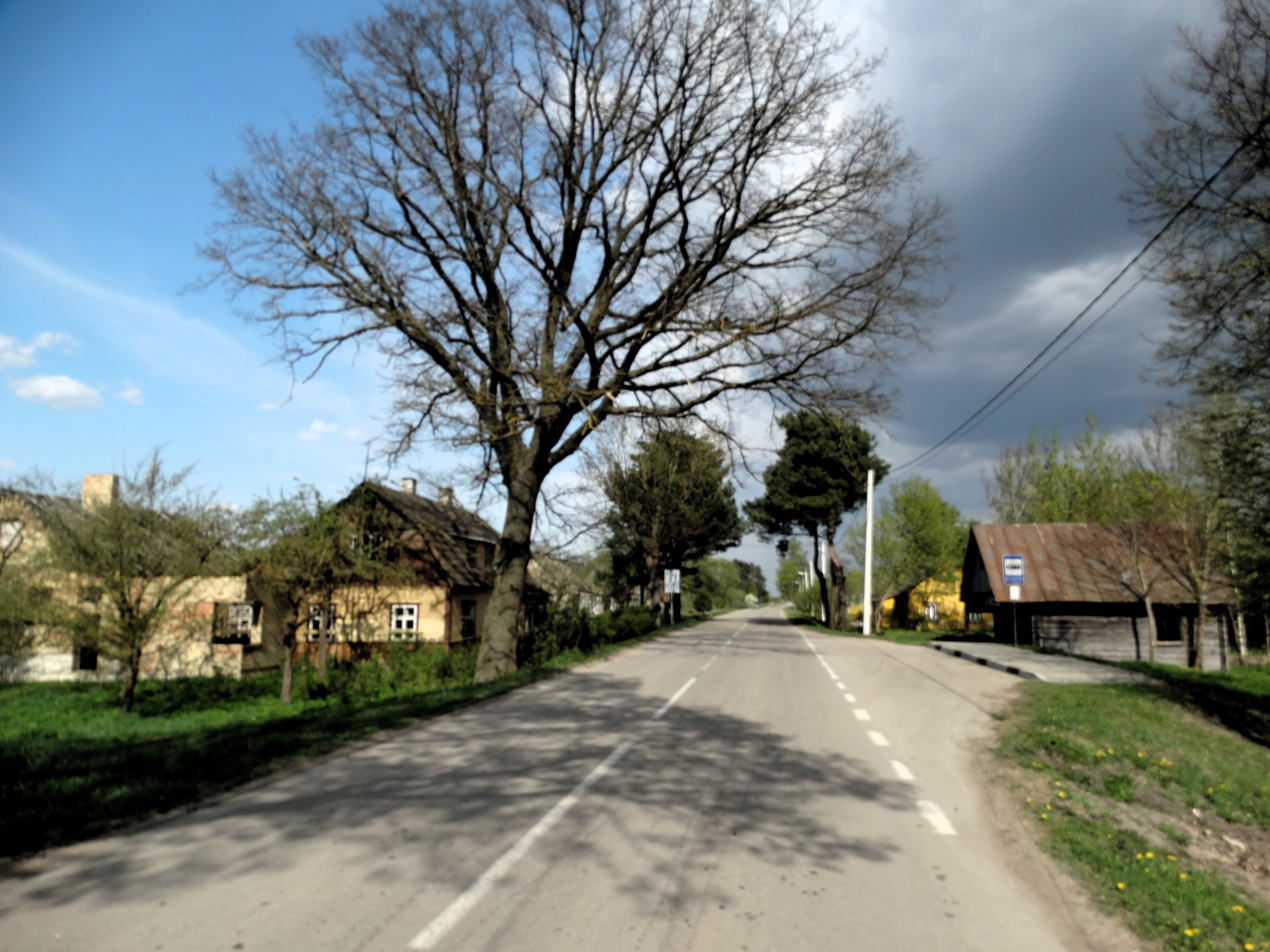
- A view along the main road in Palonai

- Location in Lithuania
- Coordinates: 55°38′40″N 23°49′20″E
- Country: Lithuania
- Ethnographic region: Samogitia
- County: Šiauliai County

Population (2011)
  - Total: 345
- Time zone: UTC+2 (EET)
  - Summer (DST): UTC+3 (EEST)

Palonai is a small town in Šiauliai County in northern-central Lithuania. As of 2011 it had a population of 345.
