= Duokiškis =

- Town
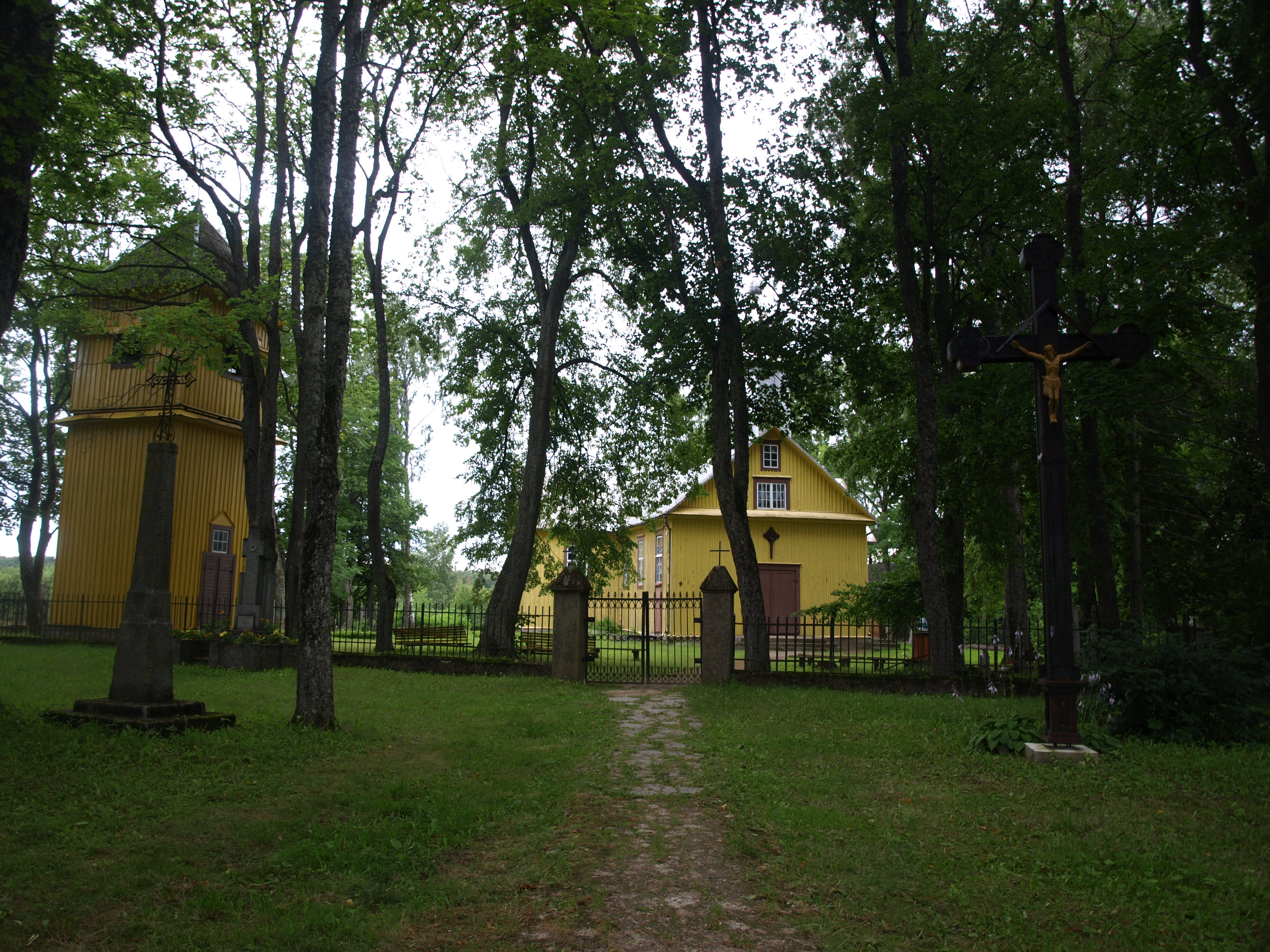

- Location within Lithuania
- Coordinates: 55°44′20″N 25°31′30″E
- Country: Lithuania
- County: Panevėžys County

Population (2011)
  - Total: 180
- Time zone: UTC+2 (EET)
  - Summer (DST): UTC+3 (EEST)

Duokiškis is a small town in Panevėžys County, in northeastern Lithuania. According to the 2011 census, the town has a population of 180 people.

== Etymology ==
The origin of the town's name is unclear. Local legend claims the name comes from a cruel nobleman who, while beating a serf, repeatedly shouted "Duok kiškį!" ("Give the rabbit!") after the serf hunted one. The serf died, and the place was later named Duokiškis. In other languages the town's name is translated as: Polish: Dokiszki.
