= Praviršulio tyrelis =

Protected area in Lithuania

Coordinates: 55°31′N 23°26′E

Praviršulio tyrelis, also known as the Pravirsulio Tyrelis State Nature Reserve, is a nature reserve outside Šiauliai in Lithuania with many rare examples of flora and fauna. It officially became a botanical and zoological reserve in 1969 and has since become protected by the EU Habitats Directive and Birds Directive. At 3327 hectares the area is mostly a forest though around 13% of the land is a bog. The reserve is home to at least 100 different bird species, 14 of which appear in Lithuania's Red Book.

== Protection status ==
The reserve was given the protection status of IUCN Category IV in 1986, meaning that it is a "Habitat/Species Management Area".

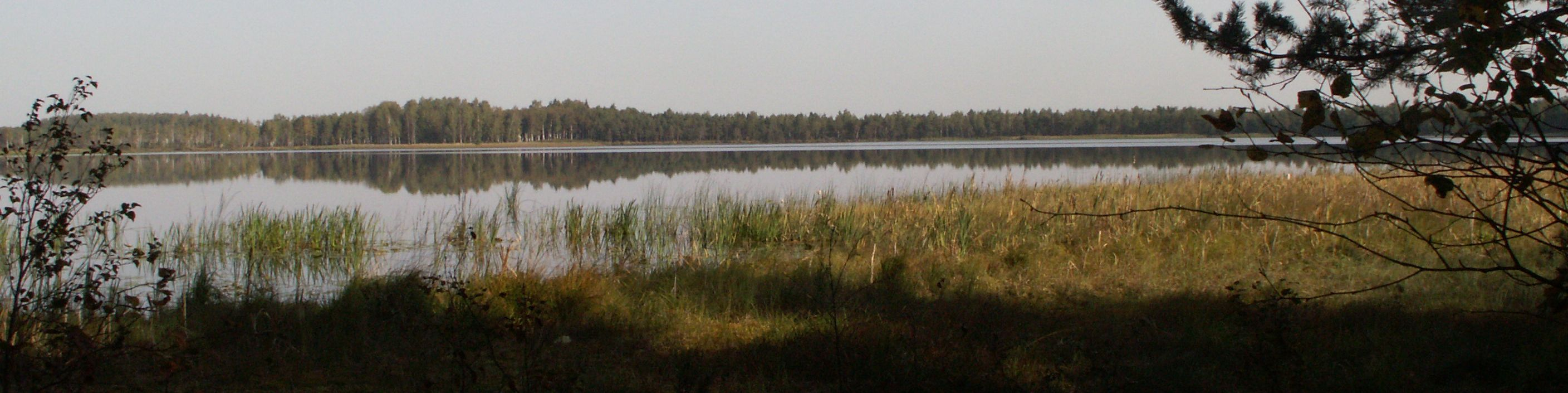
Praviršulis Lake
