= 2021 Lithuanian census =

The 2021 Lithuania Census was the first census in Lithuania carried out electronically. Basing on the recommendations of the United Nations and the July 9, 2008 European Parliament and Council Regulation (EC) No. 763/2008 on population and housing censuses, the censuses are carried out the same year every 10 years in all member states of the European Union. In Lithuania the census accounting day was January 1, 2021.

Within the framework of the census, in the following months a statistical study was carried out of the population's nationality, native language and professed faith. During the first stage in January-February the survey was carried out online for 56 thousand of residents, at the second stage in April-June the surveyors surveyed 115 thousand of residents who didn't take part in the online survey from 40 thousand households.

== Results ==
Residents of Lithuania by ethnicity (2021)
Lithuanians	84.6%
Poles	6.5%
Russians	5.0%
Belarusians	1.0%
Ukrainians	0.5%
Others	2.3%

On January 1, 2021, 2,810,761 persons permanently lived in Lithuania, a decline from 3,483,972 recorded during the previous Lithuanian census of 2001. The decline was attributed to negative international migration of 119 thousand (51%) and negative population change of 114 thousand (49%).

The census was carried out in 103 urban locations (1,916,751 residents) and 16,039 rural locations (894,010 residents).

According to the statistical study, 85.33% of the country's population speak Lithuanian as their native language, 6.8% are native speakers of Russian and 5.1% of Polish. In 2021, 60.6% of residents spoke Russian as a foreign language, 31.1% – English, 10.5% – Lithuanian, 8% – German, 7.9% – Polish, 1.9% – French, 2.6% – various others.

== See also ==
- Demographics of Lithuania
- 2011 Lithuanian census
