= 1923 Lithuanian census =

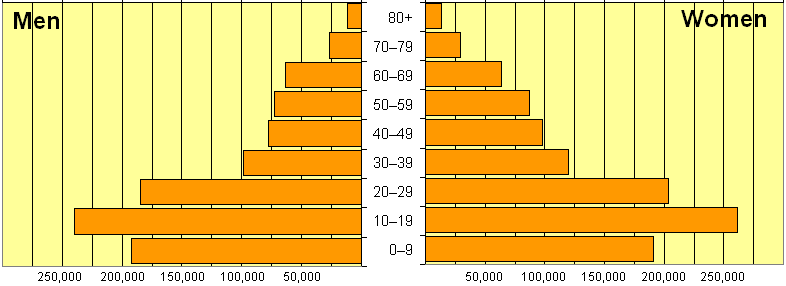
Population pyramid of Lithuania according to the census results

The Lithuanian census of 1923 was performed on September 17–23, several years after Lithuania re-established its independence in 1918. It was mandated by the Constituent Assembly of Lithuania in 1922. The census counted the total population of 2,028,971. It was the only census in interwar Lithuania. The next census was carried out in 1959 as part of the Soviet census.

The census results were organized into "enumeration territories" that followed county borders; of the 24 enumeration territories, four were cities that had been granted county rights (Kaunas, Šiauliai, Panevėžys, and Vilkmergė). Populations in the Vilnius Region, which had been incorporated into the Second Polish Republic, and the Klaipėda Region, annexed by Lithuania in 1923, were not counted. The census cost 605,600 litas. Its 3,100 investigators consisted of civil servants and students enrolled in higher education. The data were transmitted to the Central Bureau of Statistics via telegraph and telephones. Results were published in statistical bulletins during 1924 and 1925, followed by a more public presentation in the Lithuanian and French languages in 1926.

The census found that 15.8% lived in towns with populations over 2,000 and about 75% of the population was employed in the agricultural sector. There were 27 cities, 241 towns, and 16,388 villages. 44.1% of the population was illiterate, including 32.6% of those over 10 years of age. A determination of ethnicity was made on the basis of language. The census found the population was 83.9% Lithuanian, 7.6% Jewish, 3.2% Polish, 2.5% Russian, 1.4% German, 0.4% Latvian, 0.2% Belarusian, and 0.8% others. The Polish Election Committee disputed the census' ethnic composition findings, stating that Poles comprised 10% of the population and Lithuanians 76.4%. The higher results were based on votes cast for Polish political candidates in the 1923 Lithuanian elections, which would put the Polish population at about 202,000 or between 9.5 and 10% of the population, if one interprets the election results in a way that anyone who voted for a Polish candidate must necessarily be a Pole.

== See also ==
- Demographics of Lithuania
- Soviet Census (1970)
- Soviet Census (1989)
