= Seniūnaitija =

Fourth-level administrative division of Lithuania

Seniūnaitija ("sub-eldership") is the lowest level administrative-territorial unit in Lithuania. Seniūnaitija is led by a seniūnaitis who represents communities of inhabited places. Seniūnaitis are elected for a 2-year tenure.

The amendment of the law on 15 September 2008 describes the regulations regarding sub-elderships. The first sub-elderships established by municipalities appeared in November and December 2008, and by 2009, most of municipalities had established sub-elderships.

== See also ==
- Administrative divisions of Lithuania
- Counties (Lithuanian: singular – apskritis, plural – apskritys)
- Municipalities (Lithuanian: plural – savivaldybės, singular – savivaldybė)
- Elderships (or wards) (eldership, ward) (Lithuanian: plural – seniūnijos, singular – seniūnija).
- Cities (Lithuanian: plural – miestai, singular – miestas)
- Towns (Lithuanian: plural – miesteliai, singular – miestelis)
