= Šaukotas =

- Town
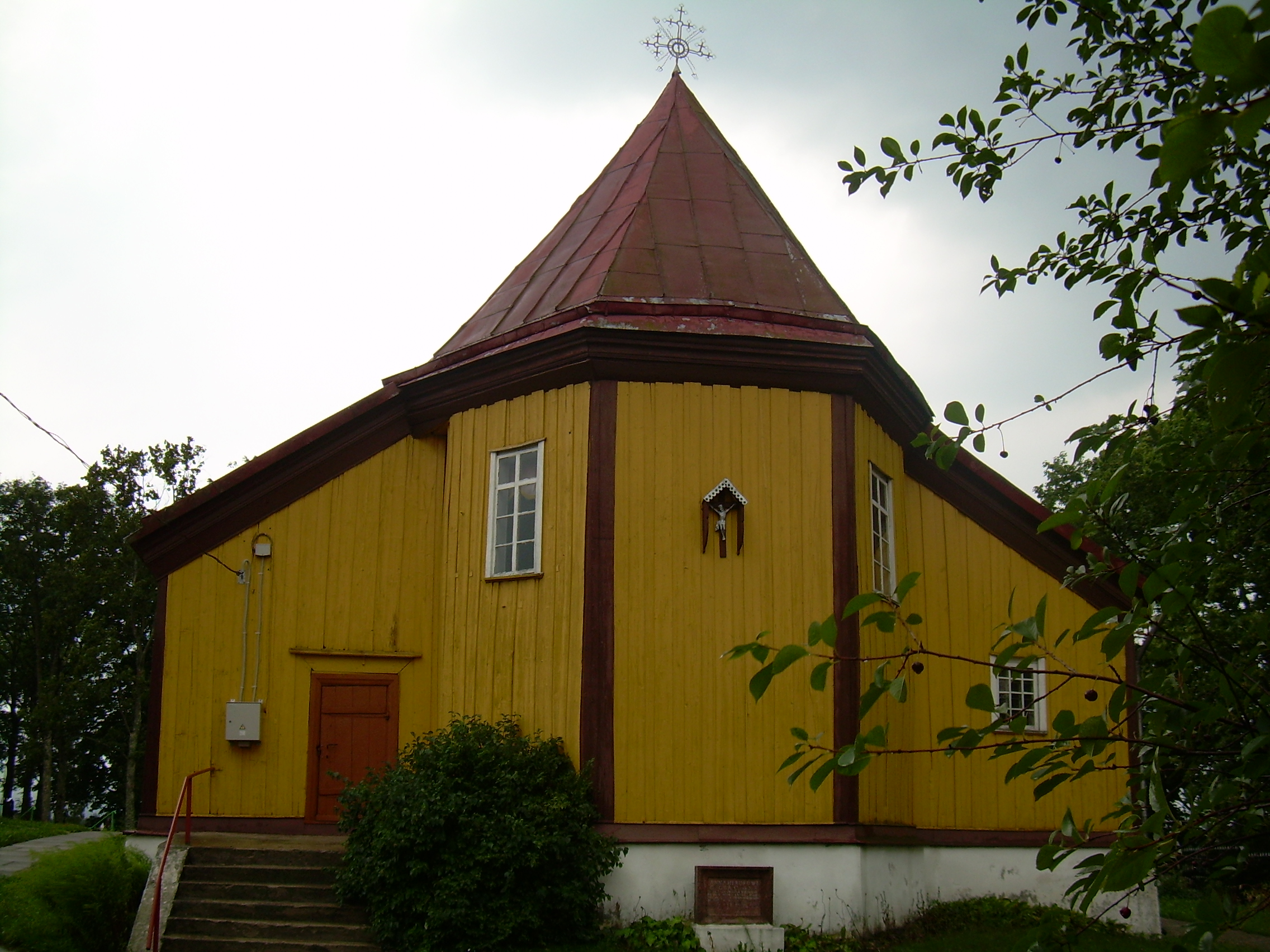

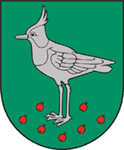
- Coat of arms

- Location in Lithuania
- Coordinates: 55°34′50″N 23°25′10″E
- Country: Lithuania
- Ethnographic region: Samogitia
- County: Šiauliai County

Population (2011)
  - Total: 445
- Time zone: UTC+2 (EET)
  - Summer (DST): UTC+3 (EEST)

Šaukotas is a small town in Šiauliai County in northern-central Lithuania. In 2011, it had a population of 445.
