= Jūrė =

Town in Lithuania

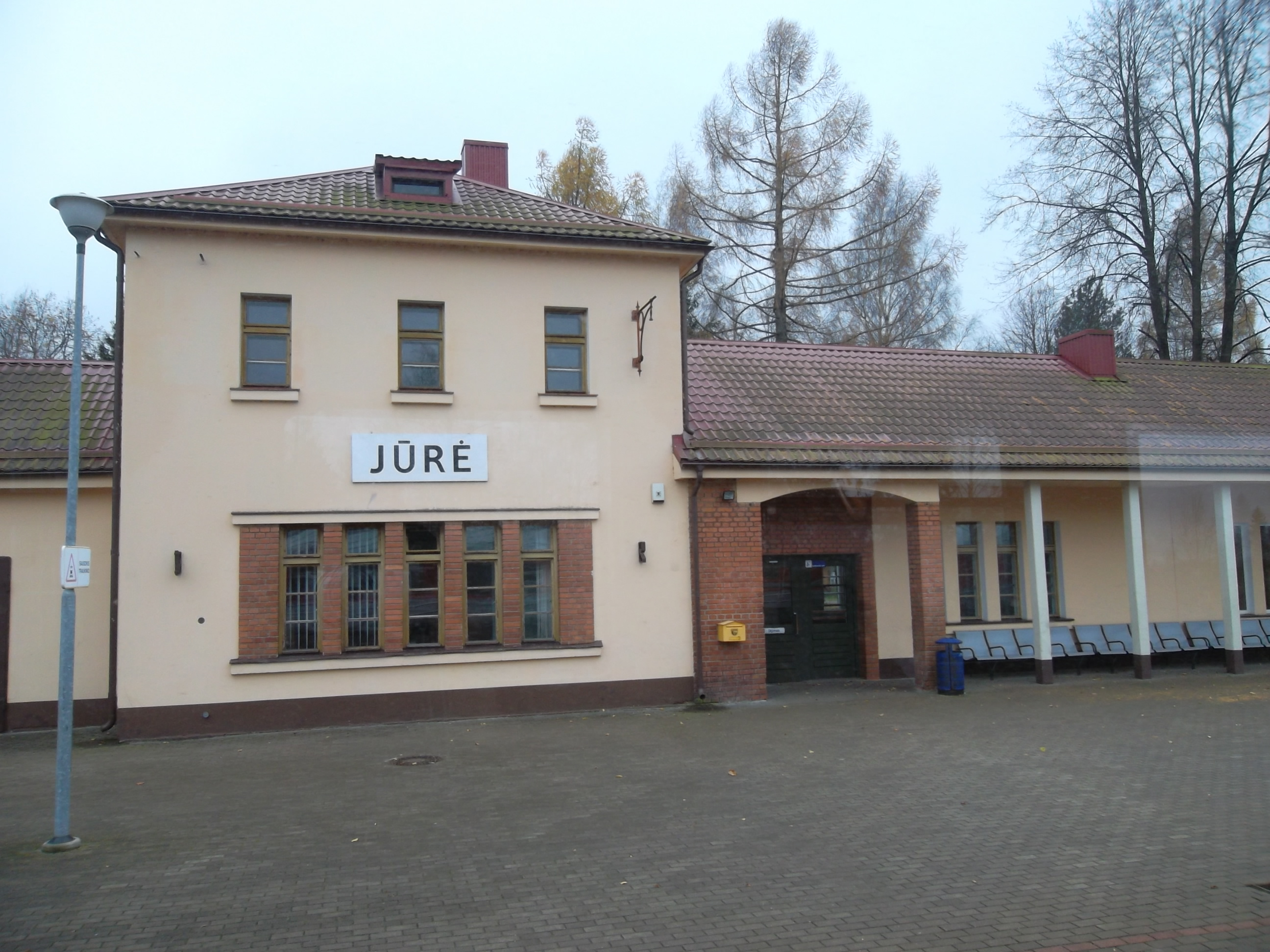
Jūrė is a town in Marijampolė County, Lithuania

Jūrė is a town in Kazlų Rūda Eldership, Kazlų Rūda Municipality, Marijampolė County, Lithuania, 7 km. east of the city of Kazlų Rūda by the Pilvė river and by the Kaunas–Kybartai railway.

== History ==
The railway station was established during World War I by the Germans.

It was granted the status of town (miestelis) in 2002. Until that its status was "railway station settlement" (geležinkelio stoties gyvenvietė) based on the Jūrė railway station and it had the same name, "Jūrė railway station", or Jūrė II to distinguish it from the village of Jūrė ("Jūrė I") north of Kazlų Rūda.

Population statistics: In 1923, there were 219 inhabitants, 1959 – 492, 1970 – 582, 1979 – 602, 1989 – 525, 2001 – 473, 2011 – 401, 2021 – 355.
