= Radviliškis District Municipality =

Lithuanian municipality

Radviliškis District Municipality Radviliškio rajono savivaldybė
- Municipality
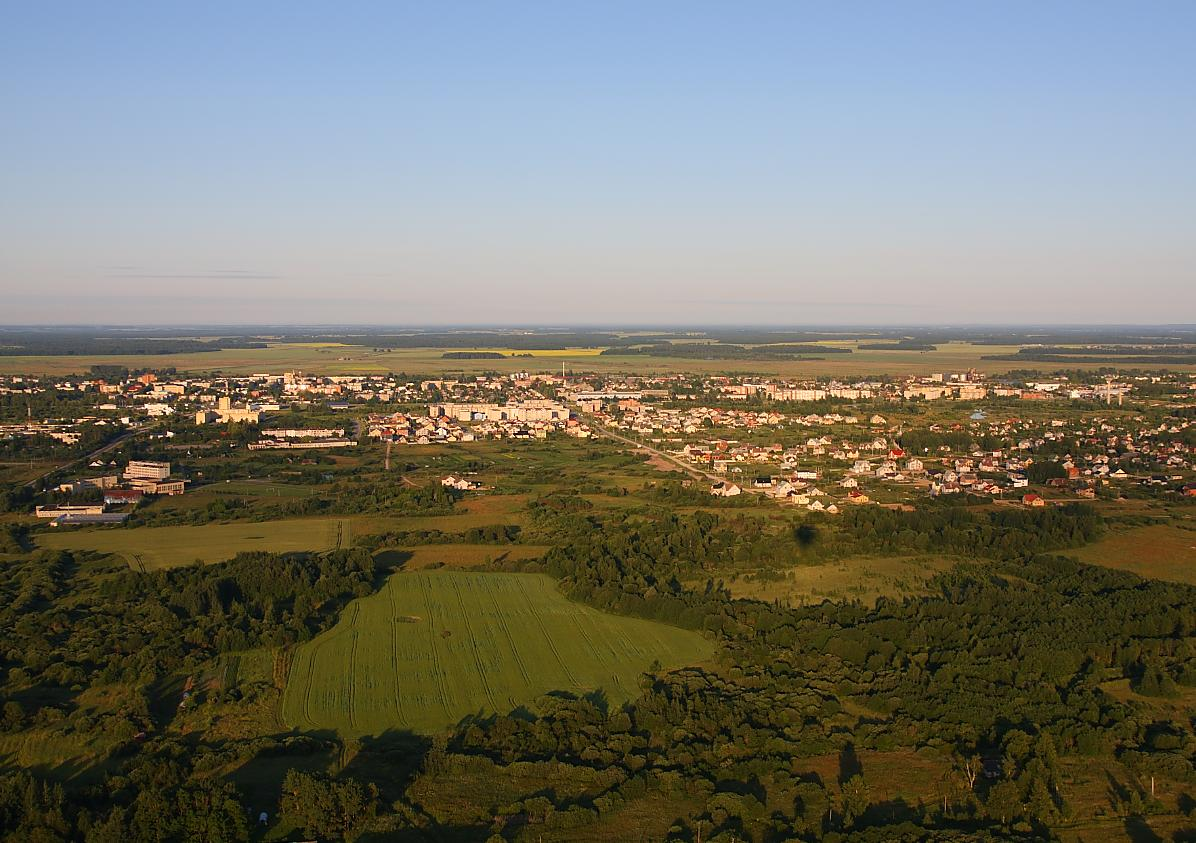
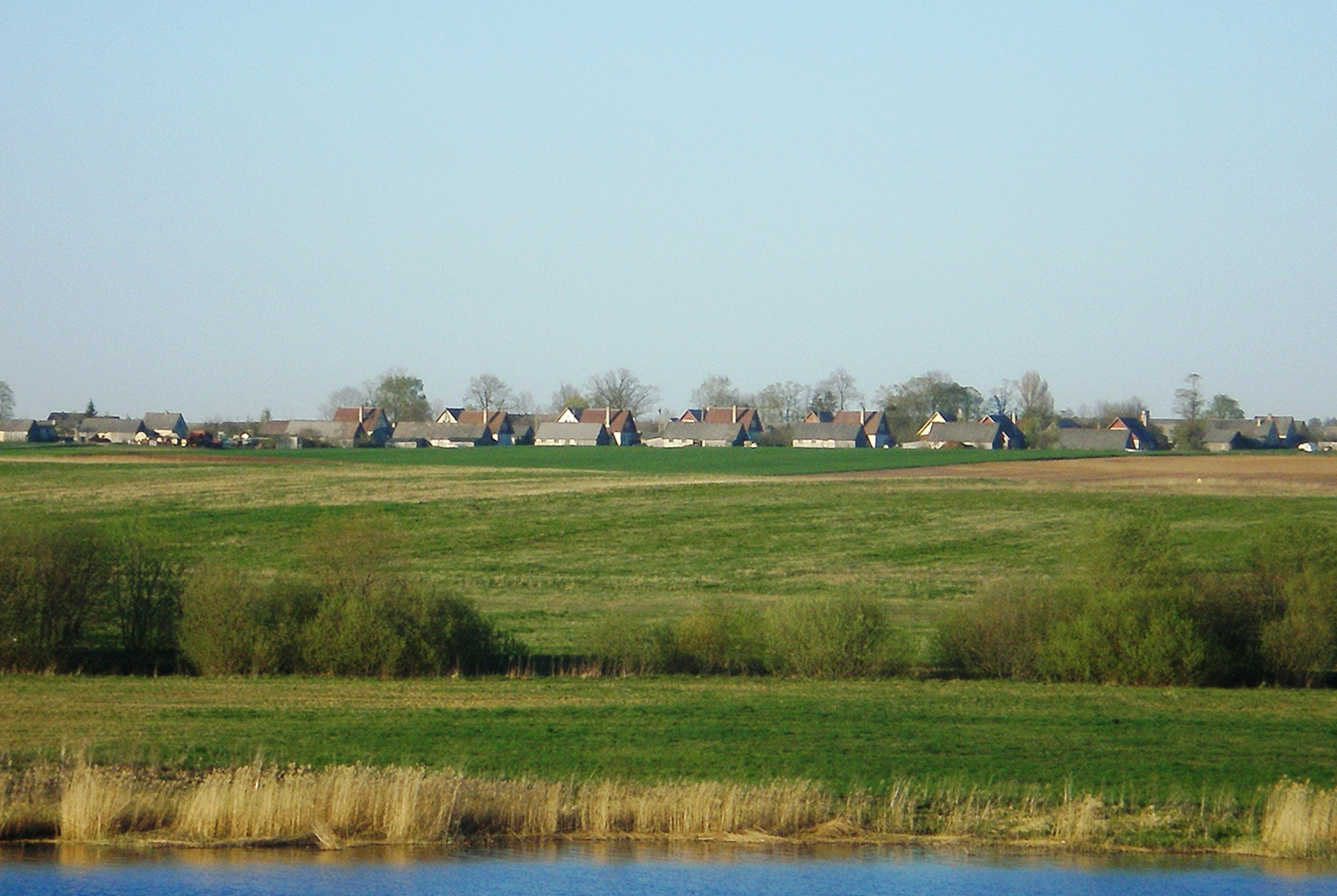
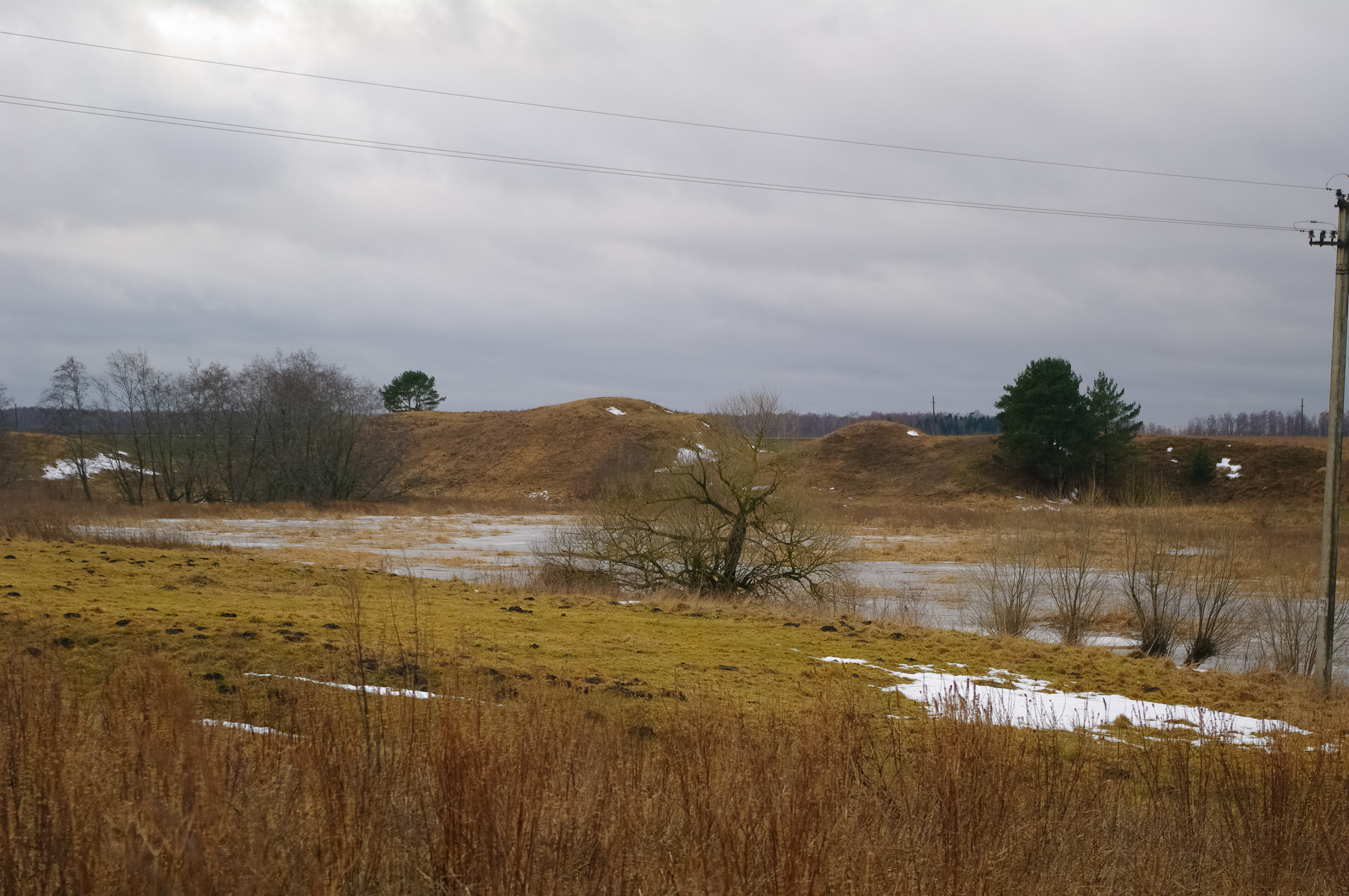
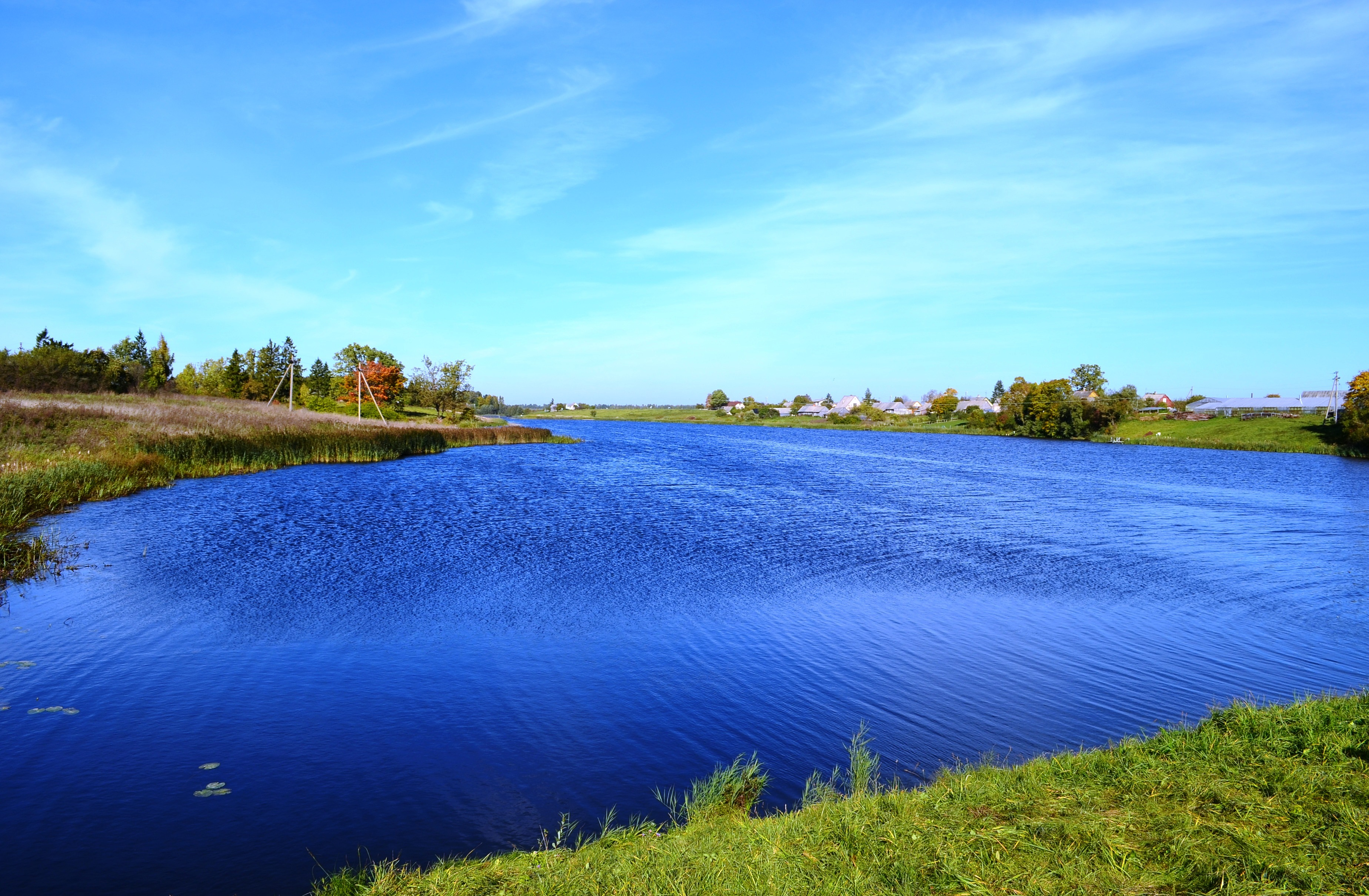
- Images, from top down, left to right: Radviliškis town, Kairėnai village, Raginėnai hill and Mantviliškis pond.

- Flag Coat of arms

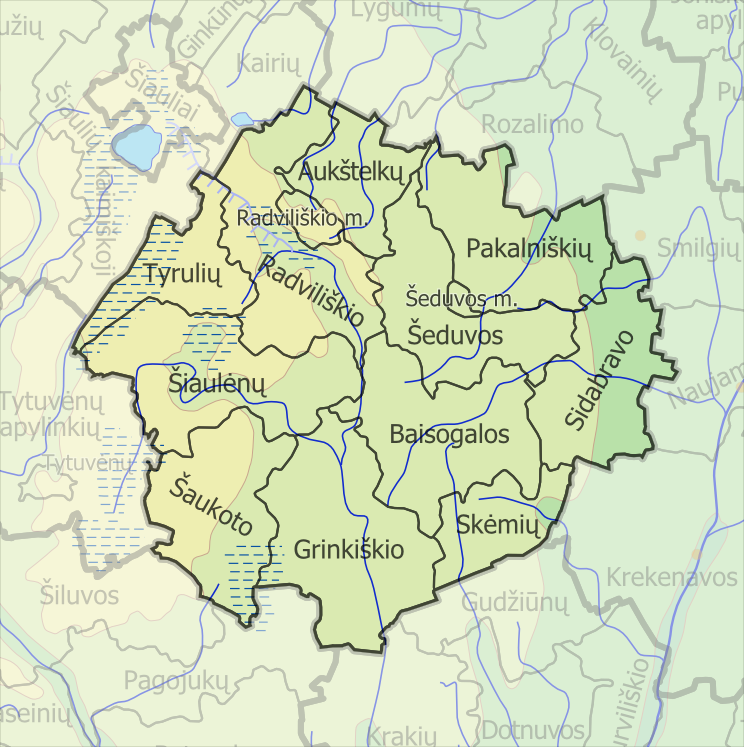
- Coordinates: 55°45′00″N 23°36′22″E
- Country: Lithuania
- Ethnographic region: Aukštaitija
- County: Šiauliai County
- Capital: Radviliškis
- Elderships: 13

Government
  - Mayor: Antanas Čepononis
  - Vice mayor: Kazimieras Augulis (LSDP)

Area
  - Total: 1,635 km^{2} (631 sq mi)
  - Rank: 11th

Population (2021)
  - Total: 34,928
  - Rank: 16th
  - Density: 21.36/km^{2} (55.33/sq mi)
  - Rank: 30th
- Time zone: UTC+2 (EET)
  - Summer (DST): UTC+3 (EEST)
- Telephone code: 422
- Major settlements: Radviliškis (pop. 14,976); Šeduva (pop. 2,383); Tyruliai (pop. 207)
- Website: www.radviliskis.lt

Radviliškis District Municipality (Lithuanian: Radviliškio rajono savivaldybė) is one of the seven municipalities of Šiauliai County (Šiaulių apskritis) in Lithuania. Radviliškis town has been its center since 1950.

Radviliškis district has 13 subdivisions or elderships (Seniūnija).

== Industry ==
Radviliškis is known for its soft beverages, timber processing, furniture and machinery production industries, sewn and knitted men's and ladies' wear, and the biggest second-hand car market in Northern Lithuania. The district is famous for extracting peat also.

Agriculture is developed in the district because of the high fecundity of the soil. The main agriculture branches are cattle, pigs, sheep breeding, cereal, sugar beets, meat, and milk production. The production rates for meat, milk, grain, and sugar beets are among the highest in Lithuania.

Farmers also grow currants and strawberries, breed turkeys and ostriches.

== Institutions ==
There are 50 educational institutions in Radviliškis District. There are two gymnasiums, five secondary schools, arts, music and sports schools, children's foster in Radviliškis town. Representatives of district's secondary schools develop their leadership skills at the School of Democracy and Social Practice "Ateitis".

At the Lithuanian Rehabilitation Vocational Training center, disabled youths can get occupational training. The Center positively cooperates with foreign partners, changes places with delegations of schoolchildren, and pursues international projects.

== Geography ==
=== Distances ===
From Radviliškis, it is:

- 137 km to Kaunas
- 146 km to Ryga
- 180 km to Vilnius
- 180 km to Klaipėda

=== Town twinning ===
Today Radviliškis is actively cooperating with foreign countries. The municipality expands international cooperation in the fields of municipal affairs, health care, social security, ecology, monument preservation, tourism, culture and education. The district is connected with:

- Sweden's Skara – since 1991.
- Germany's Speyer – since 1993.
- Poland's Grodzisk Mazowiecki – since 1995.
- Norway's Lillehammer – since 1997.
- Latvia's Valka – since 1999.
- Norway's Stathelle – since 2003.
- Estonia's Valga – since 2004.

== Elderates ==
- Aukštelkiai elderate (capital - Aukštelkiai)
- Baisogala elderate (capital - Baisogala)
- Grinkiškis elderate (capital - Grinkiškis)
- Pakalniškiai elderate (capital - Pakalniškiai)
- Radviliškis rural elderate (capital - Radviliškis)
- Radviliškis urban elderate (consists of Radviliškis town, which is also capital)
- Šaukotas elderate (capital - Šaukotas)
- Šeduva rural elderate (capital - Šeduva)
- Šeduva urban elderate (consists of Šeduva town, which is also capital)
- Šiaulėnai elderate (capital - Šiaulėnai)
- Sidabravas elderate (capitals - Sidabravas)
- Škėmiai elderate (capital - Škėmiai)
- Tyruliai elderate

== Attractions ==
There are many places of interest in Radviliškis district, such as:

- Wooden Sculptures' Alley in Radviliškis Town Park
- Raudondvaris
- Baisogala Manor
- The 17th century Šeduva church
- Daugyvene Cultural and History Museum, established in 1990
- The Gothic manor palace of baron Teodoras von Ropas on the bank of the Daugyvenė river in Raudondvaris. The manor was built in the beginning of the 19th century. There is large park near the palace.
- The stud and Šiauliai sport aviation base in Raudondvaris
- Gomerta Landscape Reserve
- The palace of Baisogala Manor, one of the most famous architectural monuments in Lithuania. Its magnitude and ornamentation has been amazing the visitors for 130 years. This manor was built in the 18–19th centuries. The Komaras family lived there. The palace is a monument to classicism and romanticism styles of architecture.
- The Praviršulio tyrelis nature reserve.

== See also ==
- List of municipalities in Lithuania
- Subdivisions of Lithuania
- Counties of Lithuania
