= 2011 Lithuanian census =

The Lithuanian census of 2011 collected demographic data of the country as of March 1, 2011. The census surveyed all permanent residents of Lithuania during March-May 2011. This was the second census in Lithuania after the restoration of independence and the first census since its accession to the European Union in 2004.

66.7% of population lived in urban areas, 40.2% lived in the major cities. Country's population decreased by about 440 thousand, from 3.48 million in 2001 to 3.043 million in 2011. The urban population decreased by 12.9% (300.9 thousand), rural population – by 12.1% (139.7 thousand)

== See also ==
- Demographics of Lithuania
- 2021 Lithuanian census
