= Counties of Lithuania =

The territory of Lithuania is divided into 10 counties (Lithuanian: singular apskritis, plural apskritys), all named after their capitals. The counties are divided into 60 municipalities (Lithuanian: singular savivaldybė, plural savivaldybės): 9 city municipalities, 43 district municipalities and 8 municipalities. Each municipality is then divided into elderates (Lithuanian: singular seniūnija, plural seniūnijos). This division was created in 1994 and slightly modified in 2000.

Until 2010, the counties were administered by county governors (Lithuanian: singular – apskrities viršininkas, plural – apskrities viršininkai) appointed by the central government in Vilnius. Their primary duty was to ensure that the municipalities obeyed the laws and the Constitution of Lithuania. They did not have great powers vested in them, and so it was suggested that 10 counties were too much for Lithuania as the two smallest counties administered only four municipalities. Therefore, on 1 July 2010, the county administrations were abolished, but the counties themselves are retained for statistical and reporting purposes.

Modern apskritys should not be confused with apskritys that existed in the independent Lithuania during the interwar period. At that time Lithuania had a two-tier administrative division: apskritys that were subdivided into valsčiai. Modern apskritys remain only a territorial and statistical unit, while the top-tier administrative division are the municipalities (savivaldybės), followed by elderships (seniūnijos), and sub-elderships in some areas (seniūnaitijos). See subdivisions of Lithuania for details.

== Map ==
This map shows counties as well as municipalities. Eight city municipalities and two municipalities are marked by numbers:

1 – Vilnius City Municipality
2 – Kaunas City Municipality
3 – Klaipėda City Municipality

4 – Panevėžys City Municipality
5 – Šiauliai City Municipality
6 – Alytus City Municipality

7 – Birštonas Municipality
8 – Palanga City Municipality
9 – Visaginas Municipality
10 – Neringa Municipality

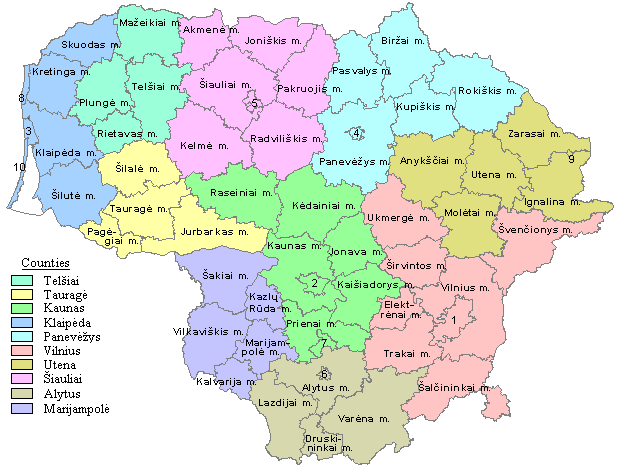

== List ==
#	County (media help)	Capital	Area in km^{2} (rank)	Population (2023)	Pop. density (per km^{2})	GDP (nominal) (billion EUR)	GDP (per capita) (EUR)	Average monthly gross salary (EUR)	HDI (2021)	Municipalities
1	Alytus County (listen • info)	Alytus	5,418 (6)	135,367	25	1.6	11,500	1,582	0.841	Alytus; Alytus (District); Druskininkai; Lazdijai; Varėna
2	Kaunas County (listen • info)	Kaunas	8,086 (3)	580,333	70	11.6	20,400	1,930	0.882	Birštonas; Jonava; Kaišiadorys; Kaunas; Kaunas (District); Kėdainiai; Prienai; Raseiniai
3	Klaipėda County (listen • info)	Klaipėda	5,222 (7)	336,104	61	6.0	18,400	1,802	0.876	Klaipėda; Klaipėda (District); Kretinga; Neringa; Palanga; Skuodas; Šilutė
4	Marijampolė County (listen • info)	Marijampolė	4,466 (8)	135,891	31	1.6	11,800	1,575	0.830	Kalvarija; Kazlų Rūda; Marijampolė; Šakiai; Vilkaviškis
5	Panevėžys County (listen • info)	Panevėžys	7,878 (4)	211,652	27	3.0	14,100	1,638	0.847	Biržai; Kupiškis; Panevėžys; Panevėžys (District); Pasvalys; Rokiškis
6	Šiauliai County (listen • info)	Šiauliai	8,537 (2)	261,764	31	3.9	15,000	1,649	0.847	Akmenė; Joniškis; Kelmė; Pakruojis; Radviliškis; Šiauliai; Šiauliai (District)
7	Tauragė County (listen • info)	Tauragė	4,349 (9)	90,652	21	1.1	10,900	1,586	0.817	Jurbarkas; Pagėgiai; Šilalė; Tauragė
8	Telšiai County (listen • info)	Telšiai	4,350 (10)	131,431	30	1.8	13,500	1,724	0.847	Mažeikiai; Plungė; Rietavas; Telšiai
9	Utena County (listen • info)	Utena	7,191 (5)	125,462	18	1.4	11,200	1,548	0.831	Anykščiai; Ignalina; Molėtai; Utena; Visaginas; Zarasai
10	Vilnius County (listen • info)	Vilnius	9,730 (1)	851,346	84	24.2	29,800	2,191	0.913	Elektrėnai; Šalčininkai; Širvintos; Švenčionys; Trakai; Ukmergė; Vilnius; Vilnius (District)
	Lithuania	Vilnius	65,300	2,860,000	43	56.2	20,000	1,960	0.875	

== See also ==
- Administrative divisions of Lithuania
- Municipalities (Lithuanian: plural – savivaldybės, singular – savivaldybė)
- Elderships (or wards) (Lithuanian: plural – seniūnijos, singular – seniūnija).
- Seniūnaitija (sub-eldership)
- Cities (Lithuanian: plural – miestai, singular – miestas)
- Towns (Lithuanian: plural – miesteliai, singular – miestelis)
