= Trakai (disambiguation) =

Trakai ('glades') is a common Lithuanian toponym. It may refer to:

- Trakai, city in Lithuania, capital of Trakai District Municipality

Also to the villages in Lithuania:

- In Anykščiai District Municipality:
  - Trakai, Troškūnai, in Troškūnai Eldership
  - Trakai, Viešintos, in Viešintos Eldership
- Trakai, Ignalina, in Ignalina District Municipality
- Trakai, Jonava, in Jonava District Municipality
- Trakai, Jurbarkas, in Jurbarkas District Municipality
- In Kėdainiai District Municipality:
  - Trakai, Krakės, in Krakės Eldership
  - Trakai, Truskava, in Truskava Eldership
- Trakai, Marijampolė, in Marijampolė Municipality
- In Molėtai District Municipality:
  - Trakai, Balninkai, in Balninkai Eldership
  - Trakai, Joniškis, in Joniškis Eldership
- In Panevėžys District Municipality
  - Trakai, Karsakiškis, in Karsakiškis Eldership
  - Trakai, Naujamiestis, in Naujamiestis Eldership
- In Radviliškis District Municipality:
  - Trakai, Grinkiškis, in Grinkiškis Eldership
  - Trakai, Sidabravas, in Sidabravas Eldership
  - Trakai, Šaukotas, in Šaukotas Eldership
- In Širvintos District Municipality:
  - Trakai, Gelvonai, in Gelvonai Eldership
  - Trakai, Musninkai, in Musninkai Eldership
  - Trakai, Širvintos, in Širvintos Eldership
- In Švenčionys District Municipality:
  - Trakai, Strūnaitis, in Strūnaitis Eldership
  - Trakai, Švenčionys, in Švenčionys Eldership
- In Ukmergė District Municipality:
  - Trakai, Pabaiskas, in Pabaiskas Eldership
  - Trakai, Siesikai, in Siesikai Eldership
- In Trakai District Municipality
  - Senieji Trakai
- Trakai, Vilnius, in Vilnius District Municipality.
