= Antanava =

Antanava (from the Lithuanian name Antanas 'Anthony') may refer to the following Lithuanian villages:

- Antanava, Debeikiai, in Debeikiai Eldership of Anykščiai District Municipality
- Antanava, Kavarskas, in Kavarskas Eldership of Anykščiai District Municipality
- Antanava, Anykščiai, in Kurkliai Eldership of Anykščiai District Municipality
- Antanava, Jurbarkas, in Jurbarkas District Municipality
- Antanava, Kaunas, in Kaunas District Municipality
- Antanava, Gudžiūnai, in Gudžiūnai Eldership of Kėdainiai District Municipality
- Antanava, Josvainiai, in Josvainiai Eldership of Kėdainiai District Municipality
- Antanava, Kelmė, in Kelmė District Municipality
- Antanava, Mažeikiai, in Mažeikiai District Municipality
- Antanava, Alanta, in Alanta Eldership of Molėtai District Municipality
- Antanava, Balninkai, in Balninkai Eldership of Molėtai District Municipality
- Antanava, Dubingiai, in Dubingiai Eldership of Molėtai District Municipality
- Antanava, Luokesa, in Luokesa Eldership of Molėtai District Municipality
- Antanava, Panevėžys, in Panevėžys District Municipality
- Antanava, Aukštelkai, in Aukštelkai Eldership of Radviliškis District Municipality
- Antanava, Sidabravas, in Sidabravas Eldership of Radviliškis District Municipality
- Antanava, Raseiniai, in Raseiniai District Municipality
- Antanava, Rokiškis, in Rokiškis District Municipality
- Antanava, Švenčionys, in Švenčionys District Municipality
- Antanava, Zarasai, in Zarasai District Municipality.
- Former name of Antanavas, village in Marijampolė County, Lithuania

== See also ==
- Antonov (disambiguation)
- Antonowo
- Antonovo (disambiguation)
