= Antonovo (inhabited locality) =

Antonovo is a town in the Targovishte Province of northeastern Bulgaria.

Antonovo may also refer to the following rural localities in Russia:

- Antonovo, Belozersky District, Vologda Oblast
- Antonovo, Cherepovetsky District, Vologda Oblast
- Antonovo, Ustyuzhensky District, Vologda Oblast
- Antonovo, Velikoustyugsky District, Vologda Oblast
- Antonovo, Kubenskoye Rural Settlement, Vologodsky District, Vologda Oblast
- Antonovo, Novlenskoye Rural Settlement, Vologodsky District, Vologda Oblast

== See also ==
- Antonov (disambiguation)
- Antonowo
- Antanava
