= Alioniai Eldership =

The Alioniai Eldership (Lithuanian: Alionių seniūnija) is an eldership of Lithuania, located in the Širvintos District Municipality. In 2021 its population was 706.
