= Black ceramics in Lithuania =

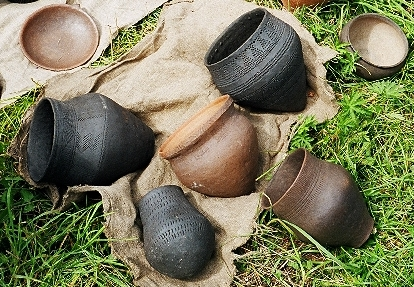
Pots, in Kernavė at the "Living Archaeology" festival

Black ceramics in Lithuania ― one of the types of blacksmoked ceramics, produced using a special technology. It is also called: black-polished, black, gray, smoky, smoked ceramics. Such products have a black color with a metallic, green or purple sheen, but without the use of dyes. Lithuanian black ceramics are one of the oldest in Europe.

== History ==
The tradition of black ceramics goes back to prehistoric times. The oldest articles of black ceramics date back to 6 thousand years BC. They were made in Babylon and Persia, China and Egypt, and later in Greece, Rome and America. In Lithuania black ceramics were used since the Neolithic Age. During the 1st millennium AD this technique was used to produce anthropomorphic urns and other cult vessels.

This technique was very common in the medieval Europe. Archaeological research in Lithuania has proven that already in the 14th century black ceramics were widespread in the area of modern Vilnius. The Modern Age saw enamel techniques gaining prevalence and black ceramics pushed aside. During the 20th century black ceramics became a rarity. Lithuania is one of the few European countries that has preserved the art of black pottery.

== Technology ==
One of the most distinctive features of Lithuanian black pottery is its unique firing process. The traditional method, known as pit firing, involves placing the pottery in a pit kiln. As the temperature in the kiln gradually increases to 950-1000 °C, the clay gradually turns red. The kiln is then sealed (covered with moss, covered with sand and soil), and thick pine logs are placed in the firebox, which should not burn, but smolder and emit thick black smoke. The smoking process lasts for a day. The smoke closes the pores of the clay and turns the product black, as well as making it strong and waterproof. Black color extends to all ceramic dishes, has metallic, green, blue and purple shades.When the time is right, the pieces are removed from the kiln and allowed to cool.

Traditionally, pebbles or bone were used to create a smooth surface or to apply patterns to the pottery. Polishing creates a smooth and shiny surface for the pottery and helps seal the clay, making it stronger and more water-resistant. A well-polished surface will have a shiny finish after firing, while an unpolished surface will have a black color.
