= Jauniūnai Eldership =

Eldership of Lithuania

The Jauniūnai Eldership (Lithuanian: Jauniūnų seniūnija) is an eldership of Lithuania, located in the Širvintos District Municipality. In 2021 its population was 1626.
