= Baltijos Garsas =

The Baltijos Garsas Festival of Contemporary Arts began as a rock festival in a village near Kernavė, Lithuania in 2006. It has since expanded to include street theaters, circuses, art installations, video performances, lectures and seminars and other means of expression.

Music genres represented at the festival have included hard rock, folk, indie, heavy metal, ska, punk, and gothic.
