= Zibalai Eldership =

Eldership of Lithuania

The Zibalai Eldership (Lithuanian: Zibalų seniūnija) is an eldership of Lithuania, located in the Širvintos District Municipality. In 2021 its population was 941.
