= Gelvonai Eldership =

Eldership of Lithuania

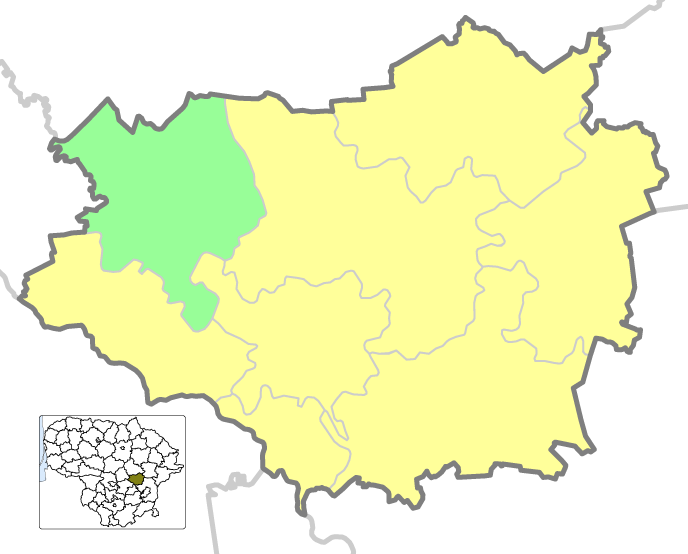
Location of Gelvonai Eldership in Širvintos District Municipality.

The Gelvonai Eldership (Lithuanian: Gelvonų seniūnija) is an eldership of Lithuania, located in the Širvintos District Municipality. In 2021 its population was 1035.
