= Gelvonai =

- Town
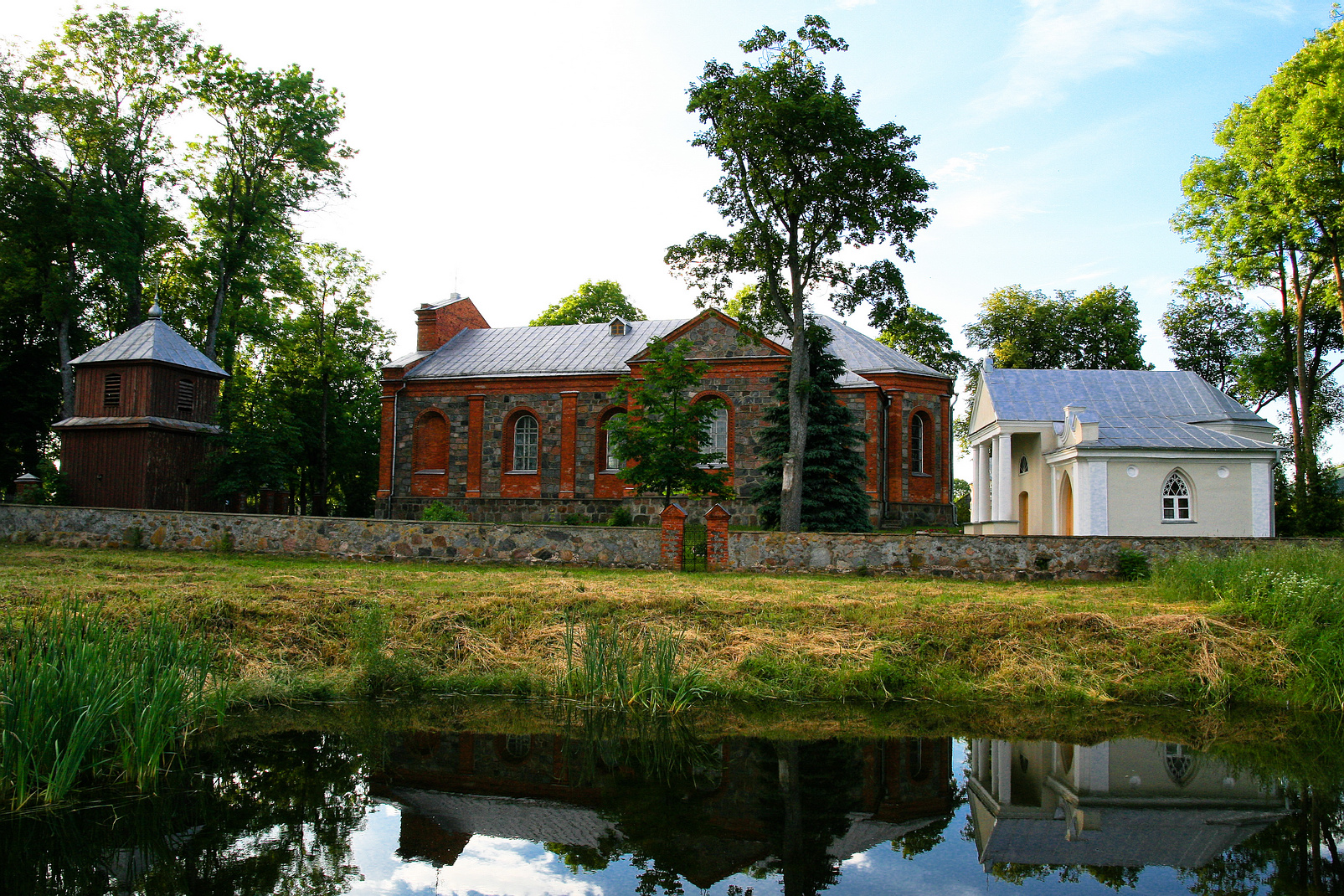

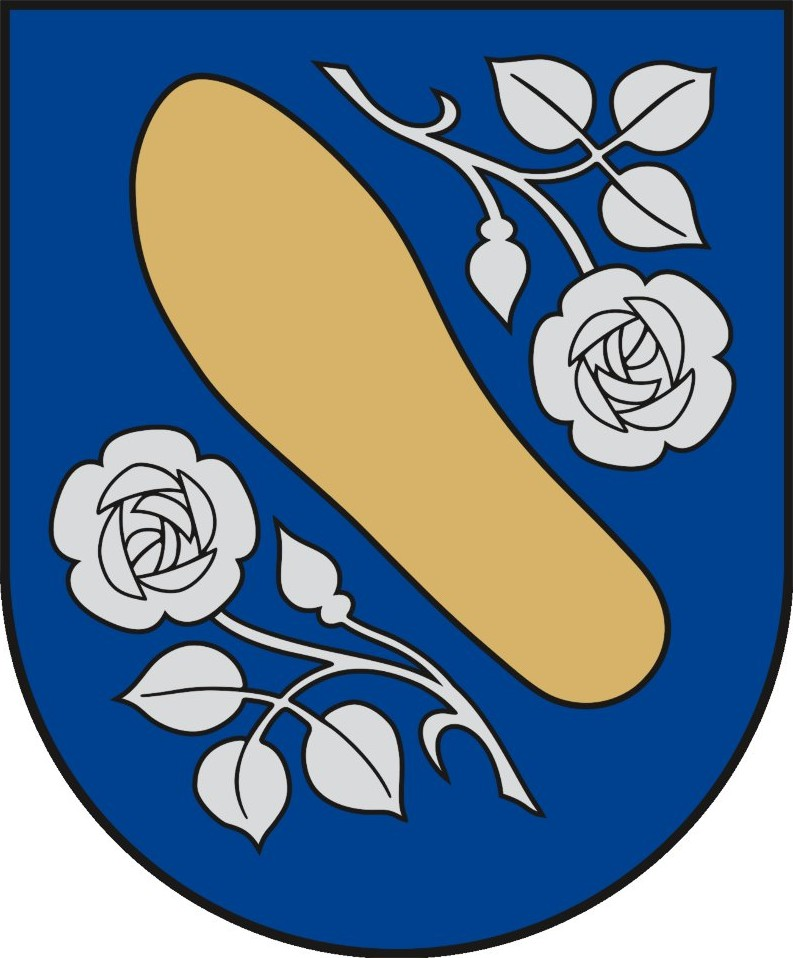
- Coat of arms

- Location of Gelvonai in Lithuania
- Coordinates: 55°04′01″N 24°41′38″E
- Country: Lithuania
- County: Vilnius County
- Municipality: Širvintos district municipality
- Eldership: Galvonai eldership

Population (2011)
  - Total: 284
- Time zone: UTC+2 (EET)
  - Summer (DST): UTC+3 (EEST)

Gelvonai is a town in Širvintos district municipality, Vilnius County, east Lithuania. According to the Lithuanian census of 2011, the town has a population of 284 people. The town has a Catholic church.

Its alternate names include Gelvonay, Gelvonis, Gelvony, Gelvonys, Giełwany (Polish), and Gelvan (Yiddish).

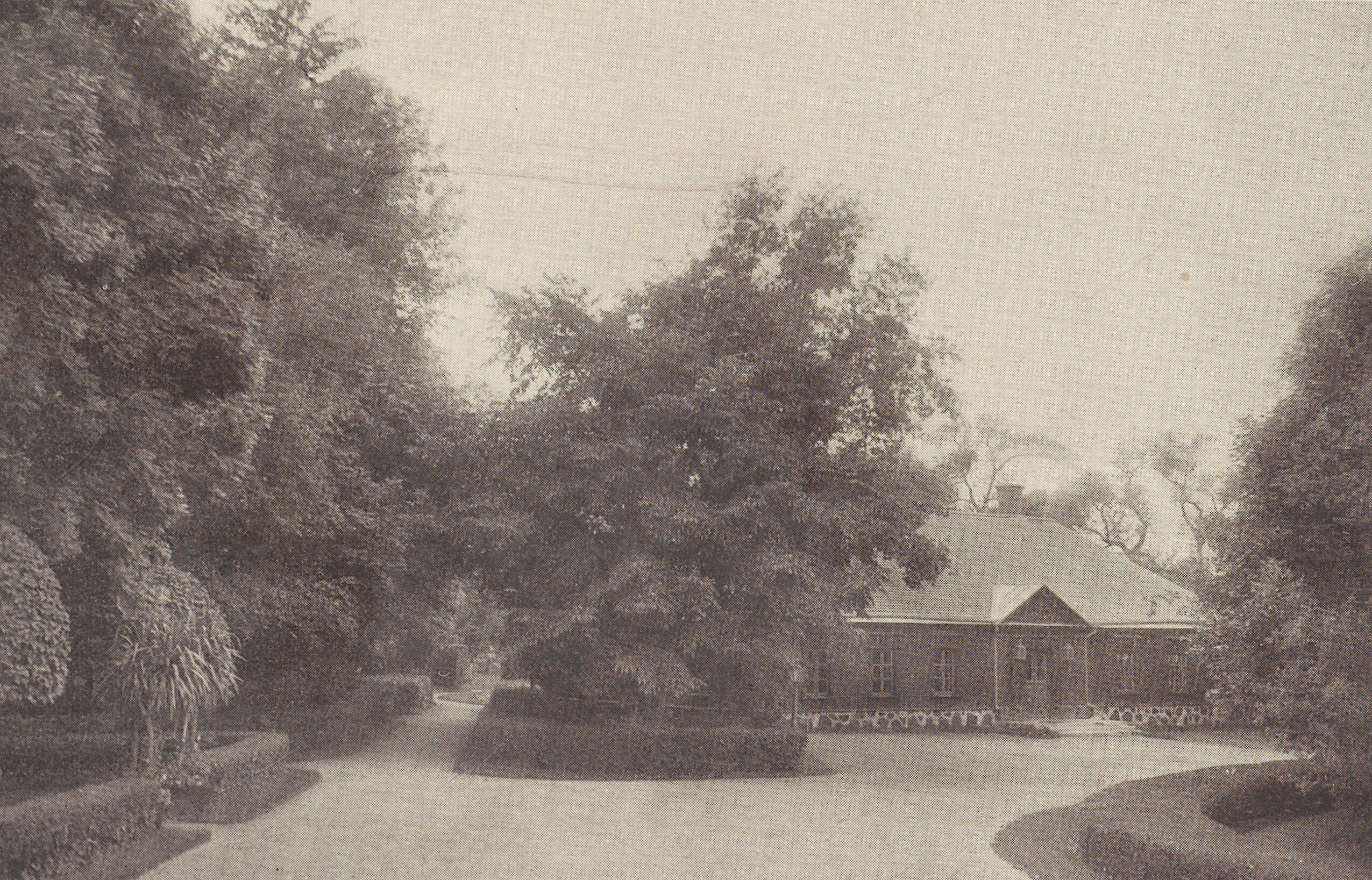
Manor house before 1911

== Famous citizens ==
- Antanas Baranauskas, Lithuanian poet, mathematician, and Catholic bishop.
