= Širvinta =

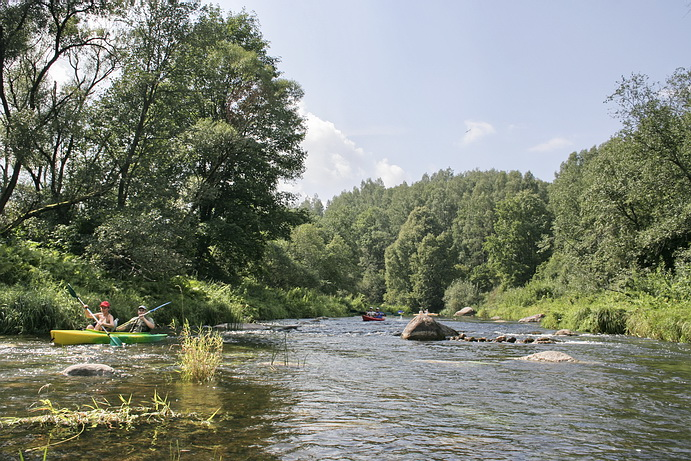
- The Širvinta river near Upninkai

Location
- Country: Lithuania

Physical characteristics
- Source
  - location: 9 km (5.6 mi) northeast of Paberžė
- Mouth: Šventoji
  - coordinates: 55.1094°N 24.5554°E
- Length: 129 km (80 mi)
- Basin size: 918 km^{2} (354 sq mi)
- Discharge
  - average: 7.5 m^{3}/s (260 cu ft/s)

Basin features
- Progression: Šventoji→ Neris→ Neman→ Baltic Sea

The Širvinta is a river in Lithuania. Stretching for 129 km, it is the longest tributary of the Šventoji. Its source is in the hinterlands of the Širvintos district. After it passes through the town of Širvintos, where a low head dam has been built, it continues through the Ukmergė district, and borders the Jonava district. The Širvinta flows into the Šventoji's left bank between Upninkai and Vepriai.

The Širvinta has a rapid flow and winding rocky bed, which is used by kayakers. The Širvinta Landscape Reserve, encompassing the river banks and escarpments of the Širvinta, was established in 1992 to protect the channel's unique landscape. Some of the loamy scarps near Upninkai reach as high as 40 metres.

The name of the river is probably derived from the Baltic adjective širmas or širvas, meaning brown.
