= Širvintos Eldership =

Eldership of Lithuania

The Širvintos Eldership (Lithuanian: Širvintų seniūnija) is an eldership of Lithuania, located in the Širvintos District Municipality. In 2021 its population was 2865.
