= Zibalai =

- Town
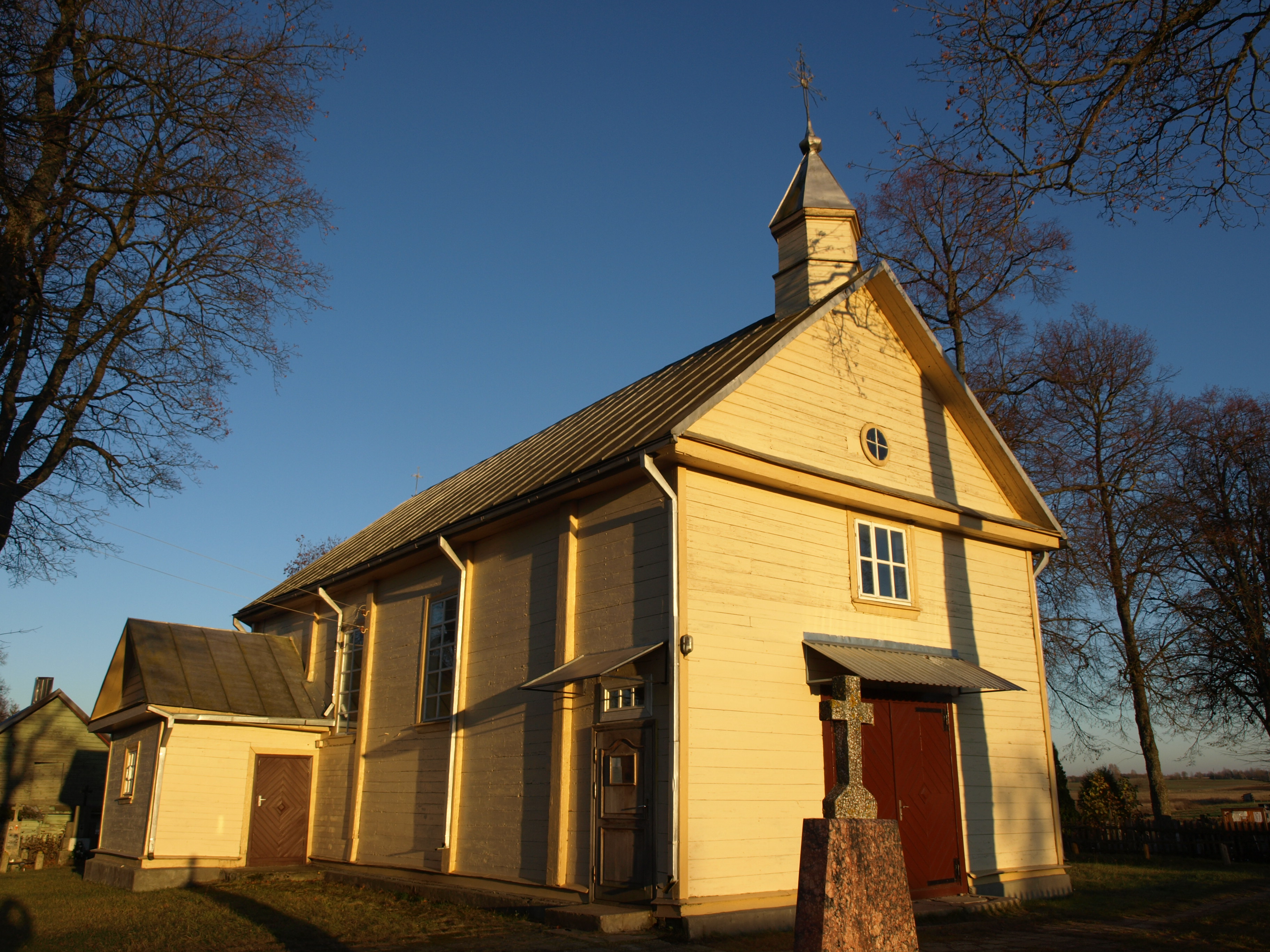

- Location in Lithuania
- Coordinates: 55°05′14″N 24°59′37″E
- Country: Lithuania
- County: Vilnius County
- Municipality: Širvintos district municipality
- Eldership: Zibalai eldership

Population (2011)
  - Total: 129
- Time zone: UTC+2 (EET)
  - Summer (DST): UTC+3 (EEST)

Zibalai (Polish: Zybały) is a town in Širvintos district municipality, Vilnius County, east Lithuania. According to the Lithuanian census of 2011, the town has a population of 129 people. The town has a church of Catholics.
