= Musninkai Eldership =

Eldership of Lithuania

The Musninkai Eldership (Lithuanian: Musninkų seniūnija) is an eldership of Lithuania, located in the Širvintos District Municipality. In 2021 its population was 977.
