= Trakai, Krakės =

Trakai
- Village
- Location in Lithuania Trakai (Lithuania)
- Coordinates: 55°22′42″N 23°43′43″E
- Country: Lithuania
- County: Kaunas County
- Municipality: Kėdainiai district municipality
- Eldership: Krakės Eldership

Population (2011)
  - Total: 0
- Time zone: UTC+2 (EET)
  - Summer (DST): UTC+3 (EEST)

Trakai ('glades', formerly Russian: Траки, Polish: Traki) is a village in Kėdainiai district municipality, in Kaunas County, in central Lithuania. According to the 2011 census, the village was uninhabited. It is located 1 kilometre (0.62 mi) from Meironiškiai, by the Smilgaitis river.

== History ==
At the end of the 19th century there was a folwark.

== Demography ==
Historical population

Year	Pop.	±% p.a.
1902	13	—
1923	11	−0.79%
1959	6	−1.67%
1970	3	−6.11%

Year	Pop.	±% p.a.
1979	0	−100.00%
1989	0	0.00%
2001	0	0.00%
2011	0	0.00%

Source: 1902, 1923, 1959 & 1970, 1979, 1989, 2001, 2011
