= Antonovo, Cherepovetsky District, Vologda Oblast =

Antonovo Антоново
- Village
- Location within Vologda Oblast Location within Russia
- Coordinates: 59°09′N 37°57′E
- Country: Russia
- Region: Vologda Oblast
- District: Cherepovetsky District
- Time zone: UTC+3:00

Antonovo (Russian: Антоново) is a rural locality (a village) in Tonshalovskoye Rural Settlement, Cherepovetsky District, Vologda Oblast, Russia. The population was 1 as of 2002.

== Geography ==
Antonovo is located 8 km (5.0 mi) northeast of Cherepovets (the district's administrative centre) by road. Yakonskoye is the nearest rural locality.
