= Grinkiškis Eldership =

Eldership of Lithuania

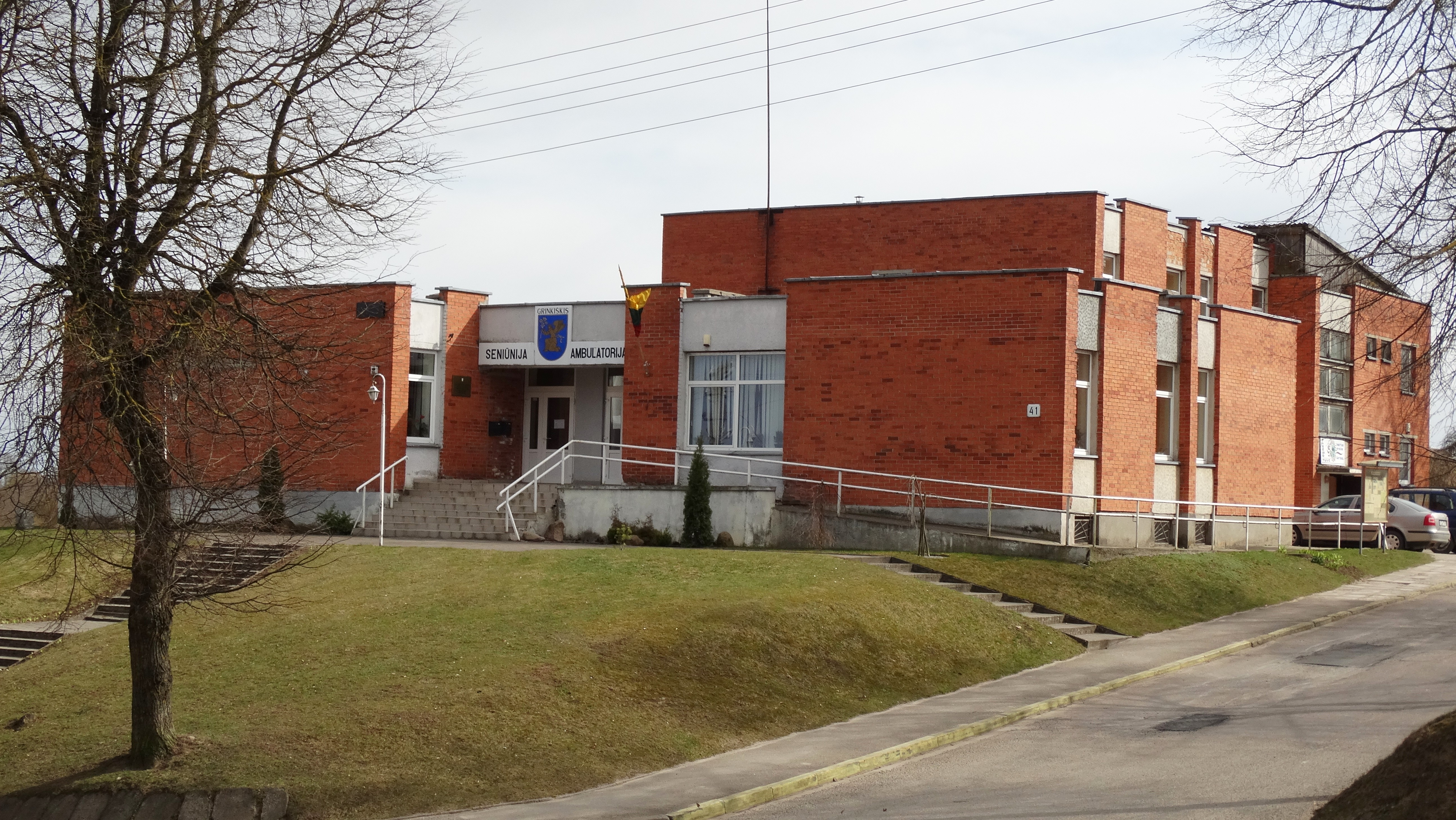
Eldership, Grinkiškis, Radviliškis district, Lithuania

The Grinkiškis Eldership (Lithuanian: Grinkiškio seniūnija) is an eldership of Lithuania, located in the Radviliškis District Municipality. In 2021 its population was 1818.
