= Dubingiai Eldership =

Eldership of Lithuania

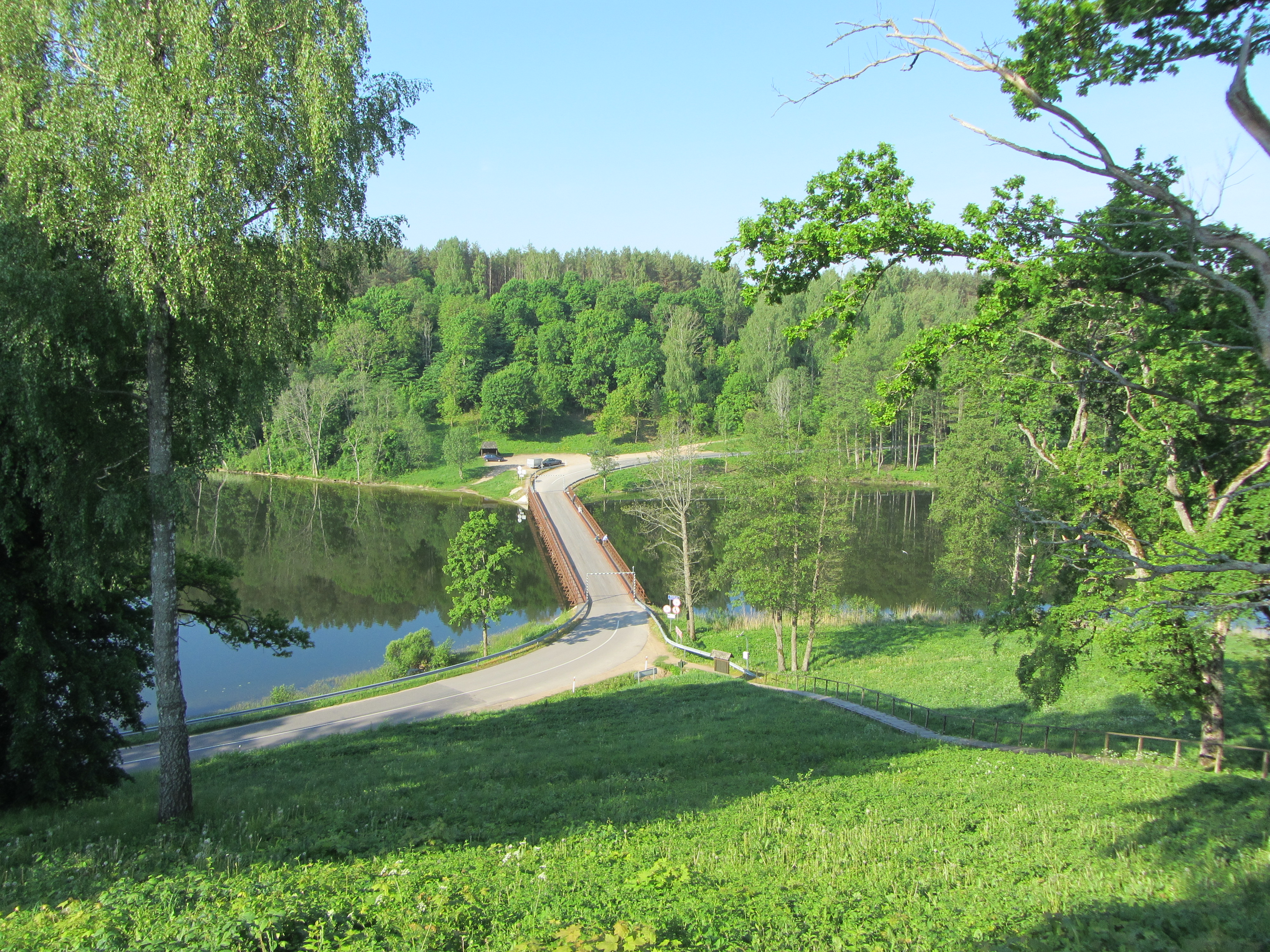

The Dubingiai Eldership (Lithuanian: Dubingių seniūnija) is an eldership of Lithuania, located in the Molėtai District Municipality. In 2021 its population was 733.
