= Širvintos =

- Town
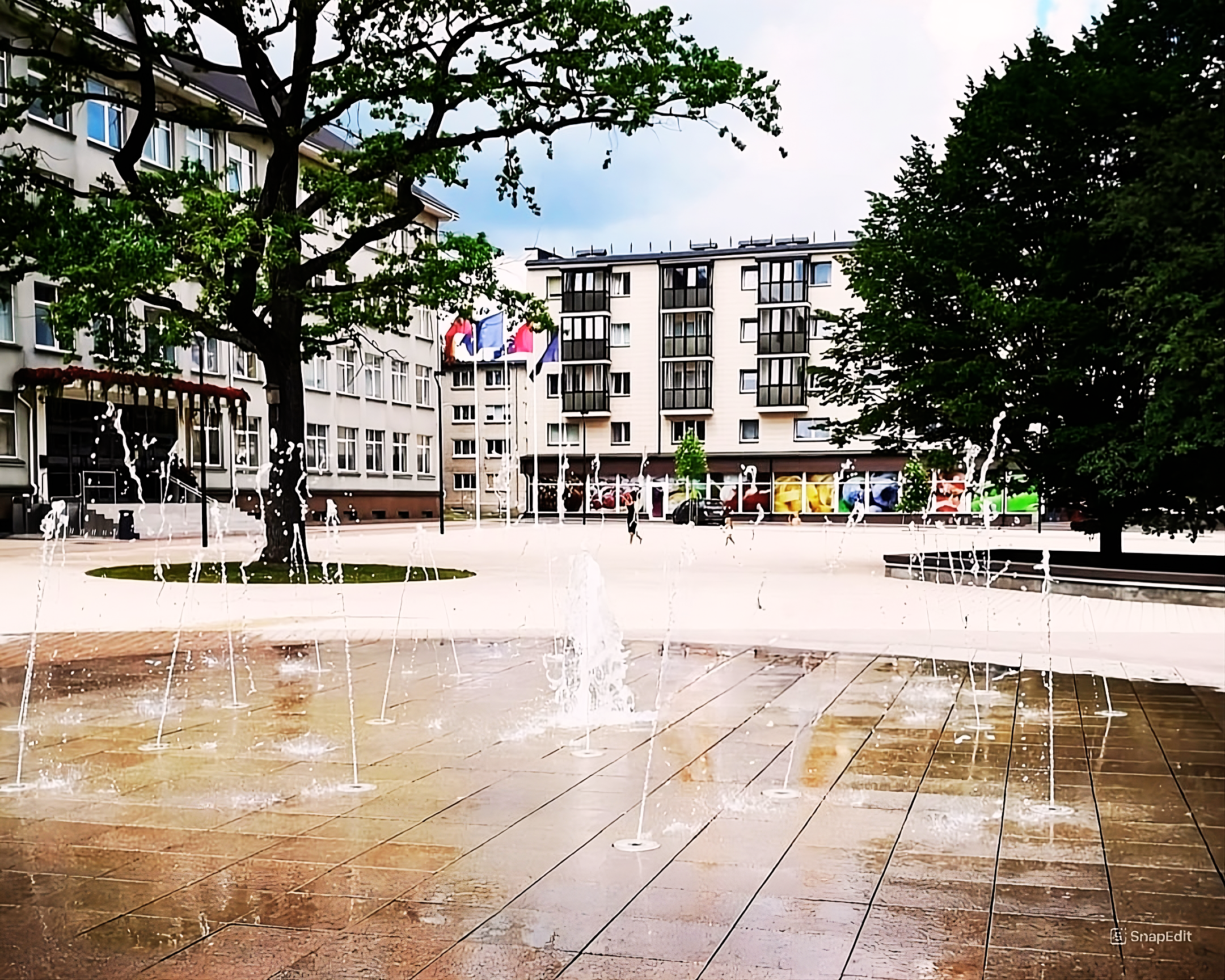
- Širvintos main square and fountain

- Flag Coat of arms Brandmark

- Location of Širvintos
- Coordinates: 55°2′10″N 24°58′10″E
- Country: Lithuania
- Ethnographic region: Aukštaitija
- County: Vilnius County
- Municipality: Širvintos district municipality
- Eldership: Širvintos eldership
- Capital of: Širvintos district municipality Širvintos eldership
- First mentioned: 1475
- Granted city rights: 1950

Population (2023)
  - Total: 6,790
- Time zone: UTC+2 (EET)
  - Summer (DST): UTC+3 (EEST)

Širvintos is a city in Vilnius County in eastern Lithuania. It is the administrative center of the Širvintos district municipality.

== Etymology ==
The town's name is a place name derived from the river Širvinta, which flows through it. Širvinta river name itself derives from the adjective širvas, which refers to the grey colour of the Širvinta river waters. In the interwar period, the town was known as Širvintai.

Folk etymology also relates the name to the word širvis, which is used to refer to a moose because of the colour of its fur. This is also reflected in the town's coat of arms.

In other languages Širvintos is referred to as: Yiddish: שירווינט; Polish: Szyrwinty

== History ==
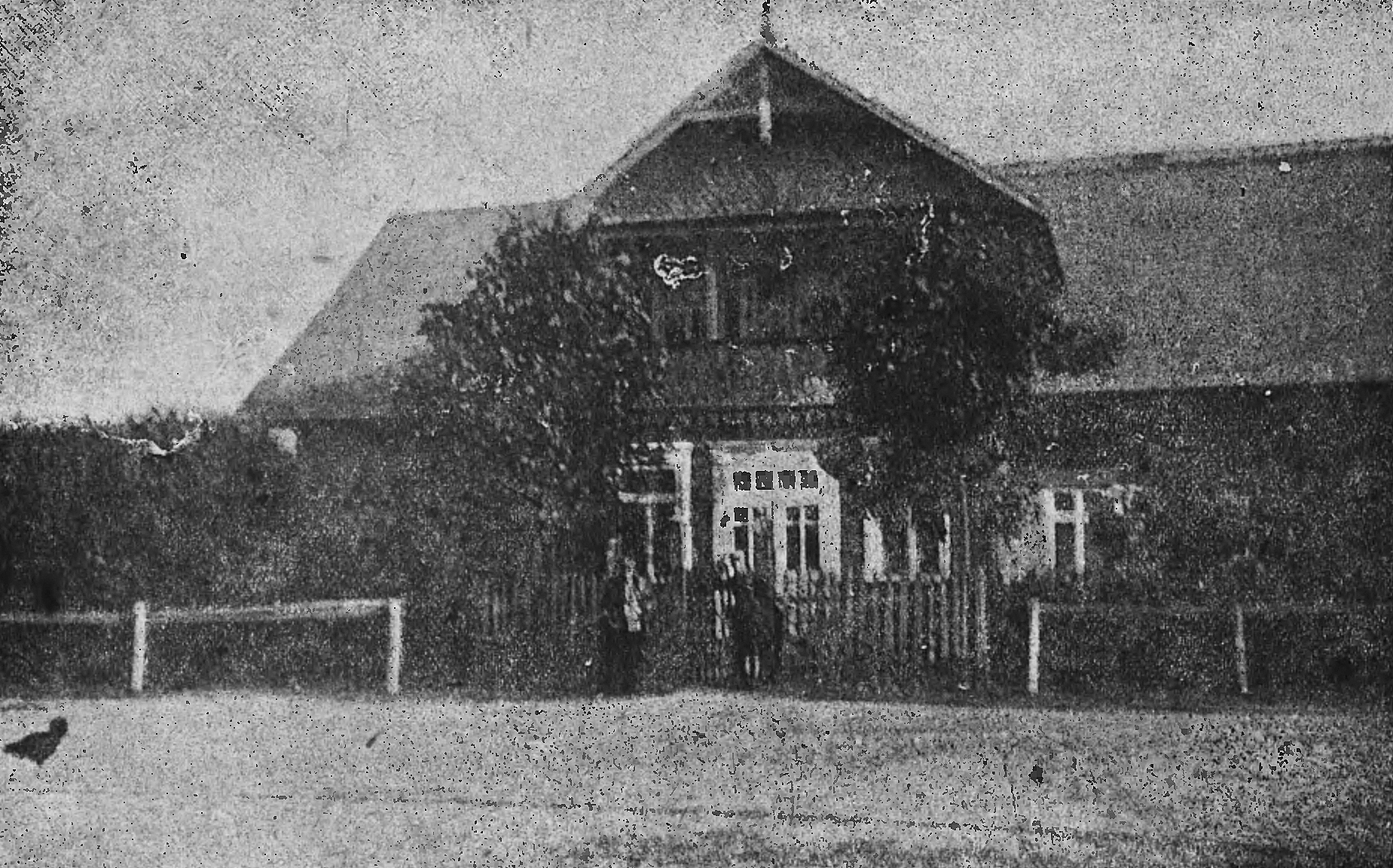
Local parish house in 1919

The first church in Širvintos was constructed in 1475, and by 1559, Širvintos had evolved into a small town. In 1641, Širvintos was under the ownership of Mikalojus Kiška II, the Elder of Ukmergė. In 1746, the ruler of the Polish-Lithuanian Commonwealth, Augustus III, granted permission to Mykolas Eperješas, the Elder of Širvintos, to organise weekly markets and fairs. In 1765, the town was home to 15 households. During the latter half of the eighteenth century, a parish school was established. In 1782, the town held three seasonal fairs, and at the end of the 18th century, horse markets were recorded. In 1830-1831, during the November Uprising that swept across the former Commonwealth, the rebel government of Vilnius County was established in Širvintos.

In the latter half of the nineteenth century and the early decades of the twentieth century, Širvintos served as the administrative centre for a district. During the January Uprising of 1863-1864, the rebels in Širvintos destroyed the records and documents belonging to the Russian authorities. In 1881, in addition to the Catholic church, there was a synagogue. During this period, a post office was also established. Furthermore, in 1883, three companies of the Russian Imperial Army were stationed in Širvintos. In 1897, the town had three synagogues, a brewery, 34 commercial establishments, and a pharmacy. In 1903, the Širvintos Consumers' Society was established, and construction of an Orthodox church commenced.

On 11 November 1920, the Lithuanian army recaptured Širvintos from Lucjan Żeligowski's forces, which had already occupied Vilnius and were advancing further into Lithuanian territory in the direction of Ukmergė. Following a series of intense clashes during the Battle of Giedraičiai, the Polish army was ultimately forced to retreat. It is contended by historians that Lithuania's independence was successfully defended at Širvintos and Giedraičiai. In commemoration of the battles that took place there, a monument to the fallen Lithuanian soldiers was erected in August 1927. The monument was funded by the public and was created by the sculptor Robertas Antinis. The monument was dismantled in 1954 by the Soviet authorities and subsequently reconstructed in 1991 following Lithuania's independence. From 1920 to 1923, Širvintos functioned as a neutral zone between the Lithuanian and Polish militaries. In 1929, an electric power station was commissioned. In 1927, a branch of the Union for the Liberation of Vilnius and a Lithuanian Riflemen's Union were established. In 1935, a branch of the Pavasarininkai was formed, and in 1937, a branch of the Society for the Beautification of Lithuania was inaugurated.

During World War II, the town was occupied by the Soviet Union from 1940, then by Nazi Germany from 1941, and once again by the Soviet Union from 1944. Before the war, the town had an important Jewish community representing one-third of the total population. In September 1941, Jews of the town are murdered in mass executions perpetrated by Germans and Lithuanian collaborators.

On 6 October 2016, a monument to Ignas Šeinius, a writer and diplomat hailing from Širvintos, was inaugurated in the town's central avenue. The monument was designed by sculptor Henrikas Orakauskas.

In June 2024, a monument to a poet and playwright Justinas Marcinkevičius was unveiled in the Youth Garden of Širvintos. The sculpture was erected just a few metres from the rotunda on which Marcinkevičius' poem is inscribed. The author of the sculpture is Alvyda Pažusienė.
