= Kurkliai Eldership =

Eldership of Lithuania

The Kurkliai Eldership (Lithuanian: Kurklių seniūnija) is an eldership of Lithuania, located in the Anykščiai District Municipality. In 2021, its population was 1015.
