= Alanta Eldership =

The Alanta Eldership (Lithuanian: Alantos seniūnija) is an eldership of Lithuania, located in the Molėtai District Municipality. In 2021 its population was 1419.
