= Aukštelkai Eldership =

Eldership of Lithuania

Coordinates: 55°50′54″N 23°37′50″E

The Aukštelkai Eldership (Lithuanian: Aukštelkų seniūnija) is an eldership of Lithuania, located in the Radviliškis District Municipality. In 2021 its population was 1366.
