= Pabaiskas Eldership =

Eldership of Lithuania

The Pabaiskas Eldership (Lithuanian: Pabaisko seniūnija) is an eldership of Lithuania, located in the Ukmergė District Municipality. In 2021 its population was 927.
