= Karsakiškis Eldership =

Eldership of Lithuania

The Karsakiškis Eldership (Lithuanian: Karsakiškio seniūnija) is an eldership of Lithuania, located in the Panevėžys District Municipality. In 2021 its population was 2473.
