= Kavarskas Eldership =

Eldership of Lithuania

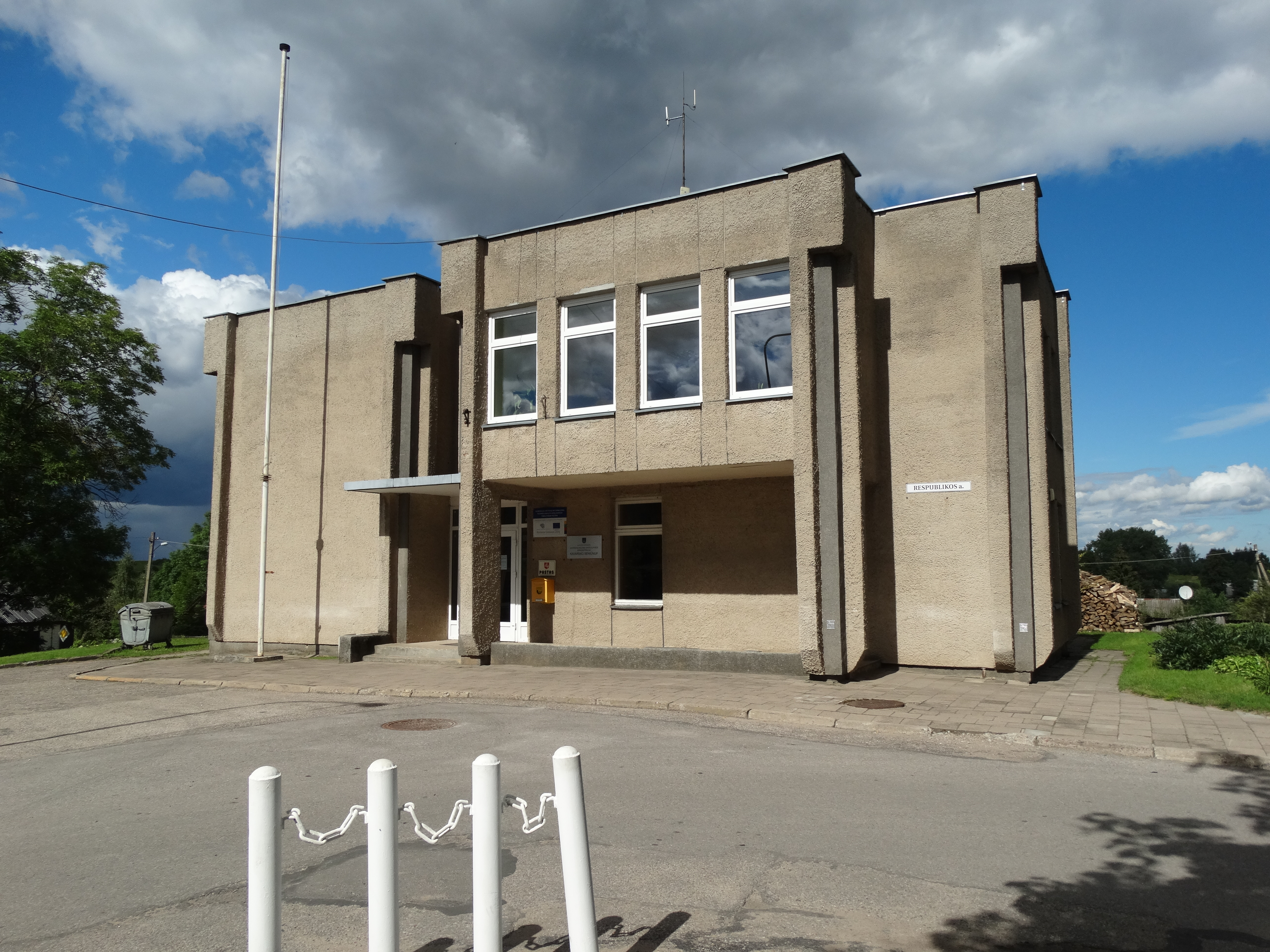

The Kavarskas Eldership (Lithuanian: Kavarsko seniūnija) is an eldership of Lithuania, located in the Anykščiai District Municipality. In 2021 its population was 2361.
