= Antonovo, Velikoustyugsky District, Vologda Oblast =

Antonovo Антоново
- Village
- Location within Vologda Oblast Location within Russia
- Coordinates: 60°24′N 46°32′E
- Country: Russia
- Region: Vologda Oblast
- District: Velikoustyugsky District
- Time zone: UTC+3:00

Antonovo (Russian: Антоново) is a rural locality (a village) in Ust-Alexeyevskoye Rural Settlement, Velikoustyugsky District, Vologda Oblast, Russia. The population was 6 as of 2002.

== Geography ==
Antonovo is located 62 km southeast of Veliky Ustyug (the district's administrative centre) by road. Selivanovo is the nearest rural locality.
