= Antonovo, Novlenskoye Rural Settlement, Vologodsky District, Vologda Oblast =

Antonovo Антоново
- Village
- Location within Vologda Oblast Location within Russia
- Coordinates: 59°33′N 39°12′E
- Country: Russia
- Region: Vologda Oblast
- District: Vologodsky District
- Time zone: UTC+3:00

Antonovo (Russian: Антоново) is a rural locality (a selo) in Novlenskoye Rural Settlement, Vologodsky District, Vologda Oblast, Russia. The population was 61 as of 2002.

== Geography ==
The distance to Vologda is 79 km, to Novlenskoye is 9 km. Volshnitsy, Panovo, Barsukovo, Svobodny Ugol are the nearest rural localities.
