= Antonovo, Ustyuzhensky District, Vologda Oblast =

Antonovo Антоново
- Village
- Location within Vologda Oblast Location within Russia
- Coordinates: 58°51′N 36°08′E
- Country: Russia
- Region: Vologda Oblast
- District: Ustyuzhensky District
- Time zone: UTC+3:00

Antonovo (Russian: Антоново) is a rural locality (a village) in Ustyuzhenskoye Rural Settlement, Ustyuzhensky District, Vologda Oblast, Russia. The population was 5 as of 2002.

== Geography ==
Antonovo is located 29 km (18 mi) west of Ustyuzhna (the district's administrative centre) by road. Nikitino is the nearest rural locality.
