= Troškūnai Eldership =

Eldership of Lithuania

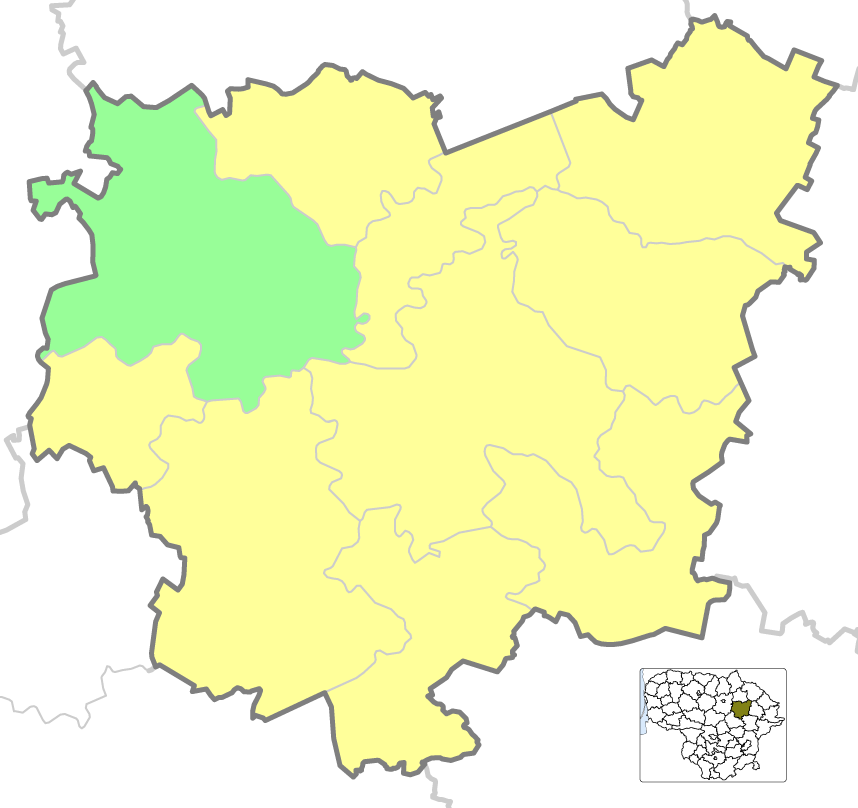
Location of Troškūnai Eldership in Anykščiai District Municipality.

The Troškūnai Eldership (Lithuanian: Troškūnų seniūnija) is an eldership of Lithuania, located in the Anykščiai District Municipality. In 2021 its population was 2214.
