= Siesikai Eldership =

Eldership of Lithuania

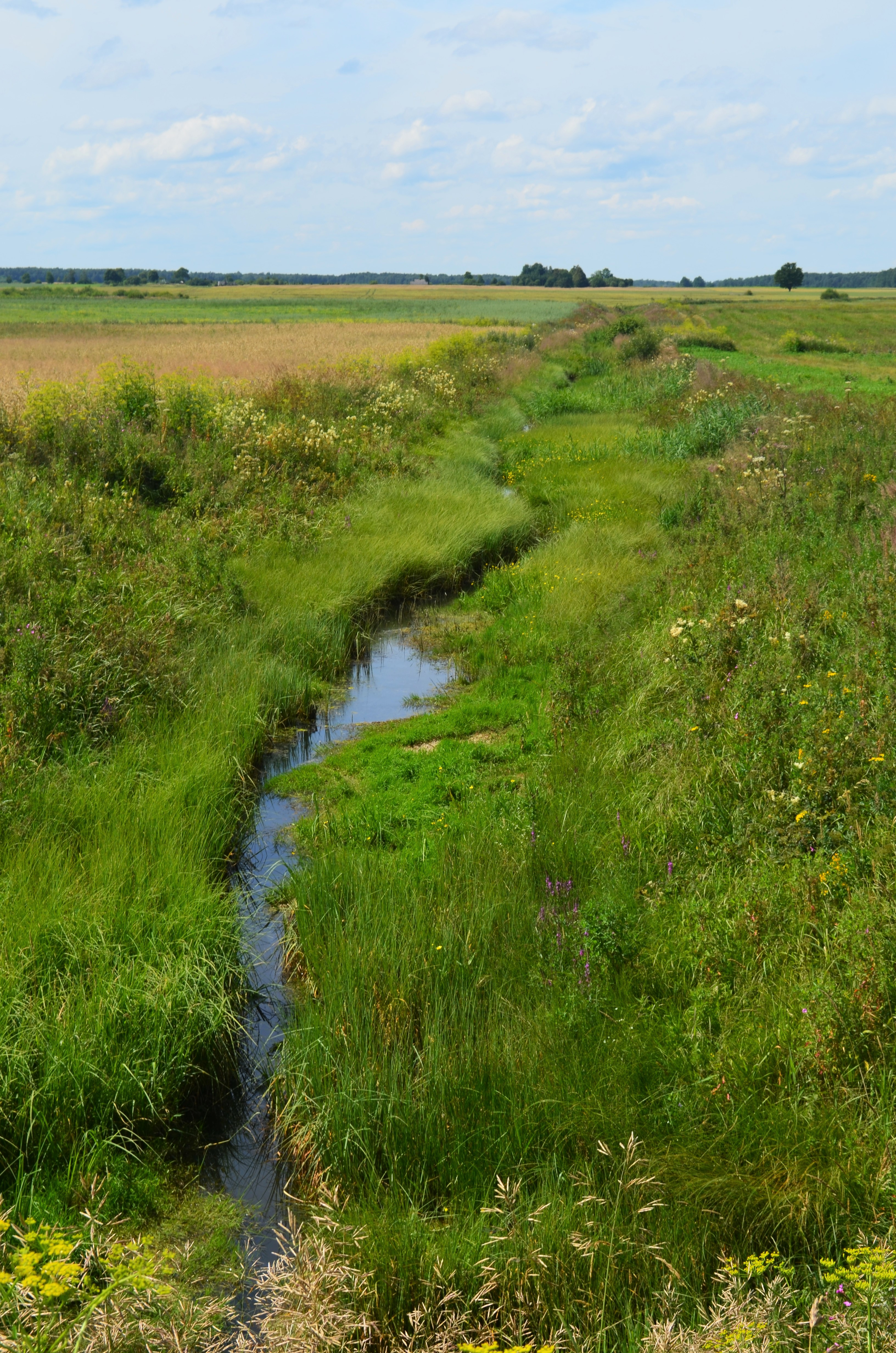
Groblė stream between Siesikai and Lokinė, Ukmergė district.

The Siesikai Eldership (Lithuanian: Siesikų seniūnija) is an eldership of Lithuania, located in the Ukmergė District Municipality. In 2021 its population was 1231.
