= Alys =

Alys is a feminine given name. Notable people with the name include:

- Alys, Countess of the Vexin (c. 1160–1220), French princess
- Alys Clare (born 1944), English historical novelist
- Alys Faiz (1914–2003), Pakistani poet, writer, journalist, human rights activist, social worker and teacher
- Alys ferch Owain Glyndŵr (15th century), daughter of Margaret Hanmer and Owain Glyndŵr
- Alys Fowler (born 1978), a television presenter
- Alys Pearsall Smith (1867–1951), American Quaker
- Alys Robi (1923–2011), Canadian singer
- Alys Tomlinson (born 1975), British photographer
- ALYS, a French virtual singer developed by VoxWave on Alter/Ego

== See also ==
- Alys (TV series), a television drama series on S4C
