= Šaukotas Eldership =

Eldership of Lithuania

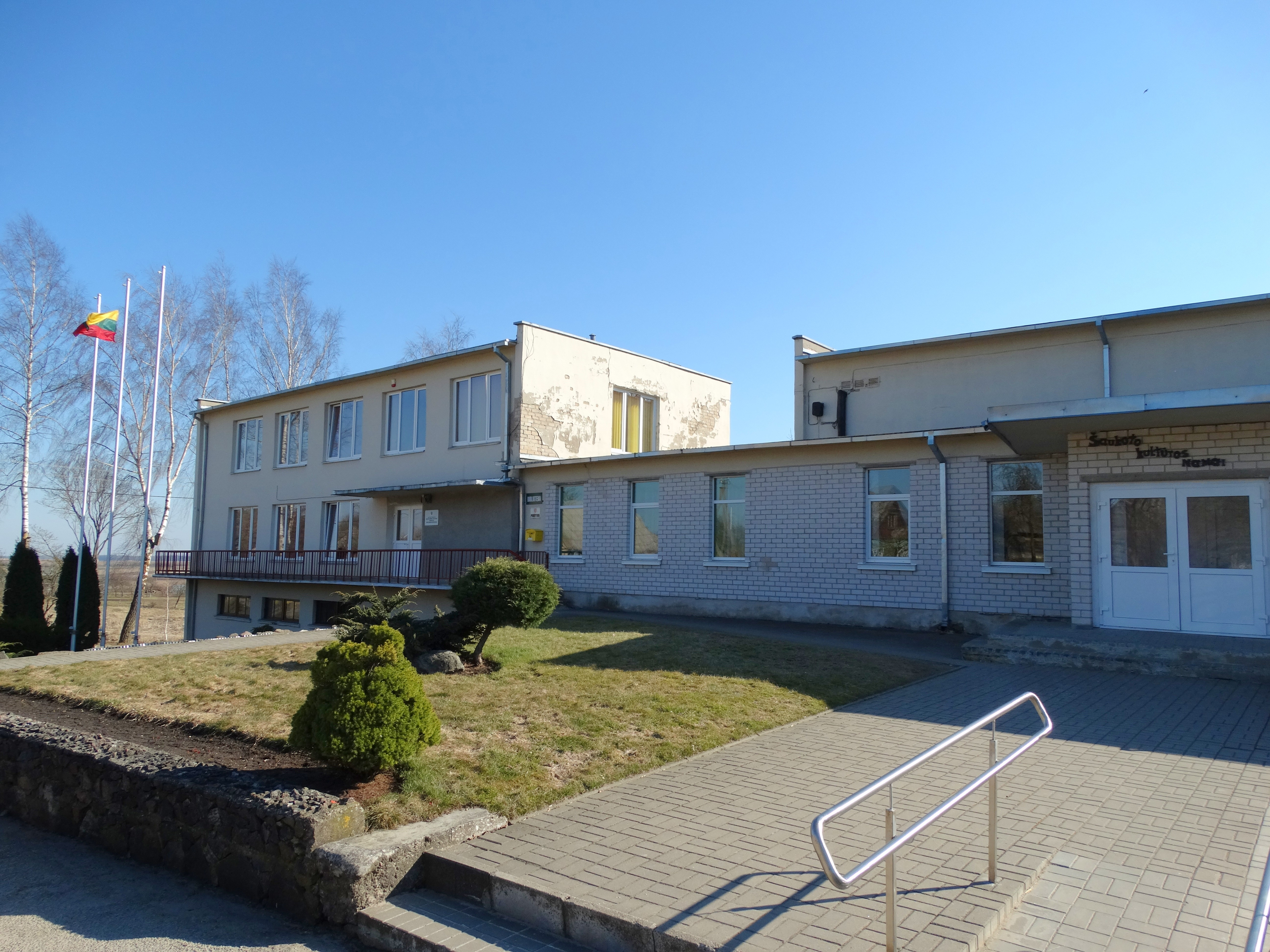
Šaukotas Eldership in 2015

The Šaukotas Eldership (Lithuanian: Šaukoto seniūnija) is an eldership of Lithuania, located in the Radviliškis District Municipality. In 2021 its population was 797.
