= Kernavė =

UNESCO World Heritage Site in Lithuania

- Town
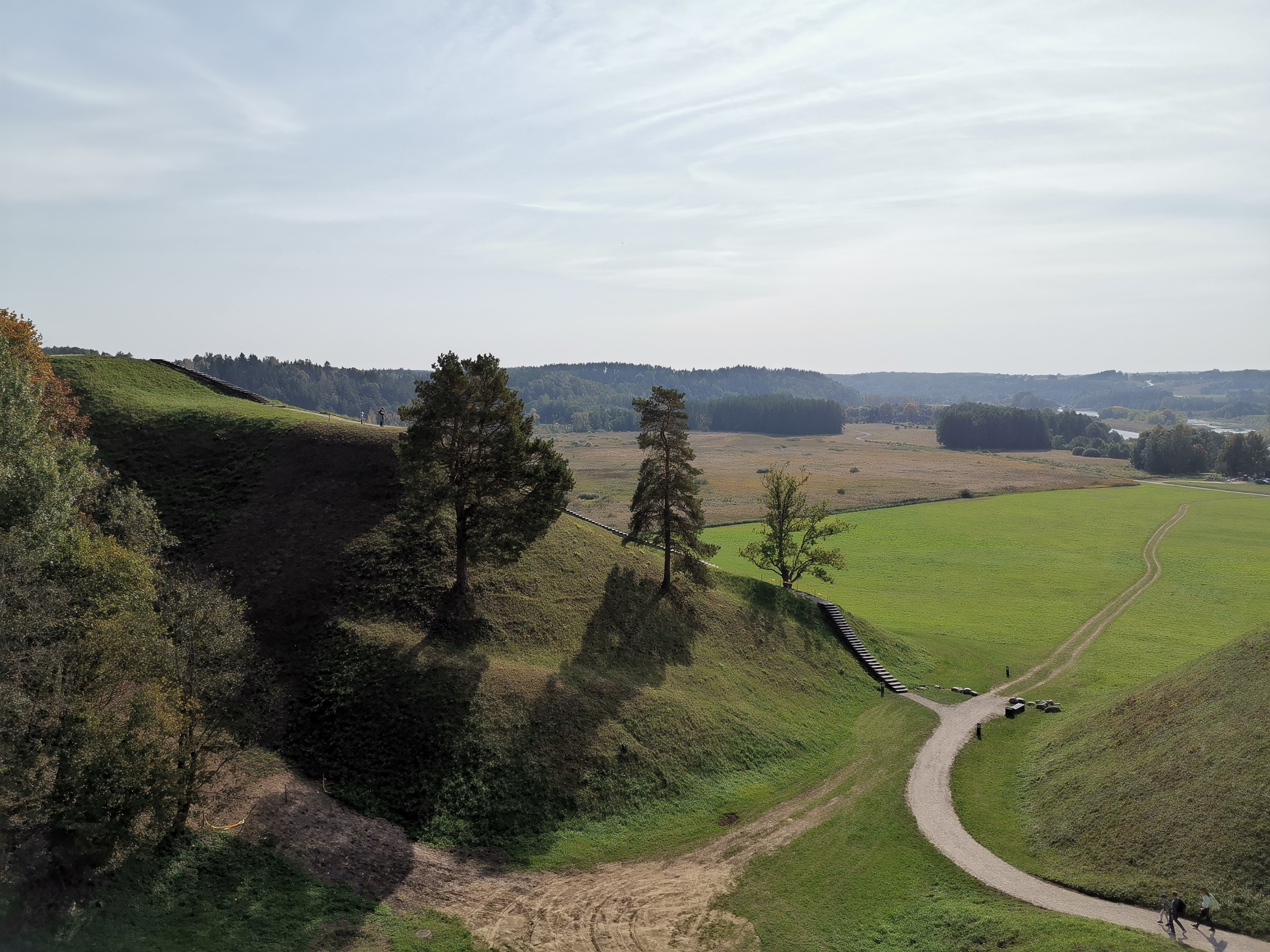
- One of the old hillforts at Kernavė

- Location within Lithuania
- 54°53′N 24°51′E
- Type: Settlement
- Periods: Middle Ages
- Cultures: Lithuanian
- Location: Širvintos District Municipality, Lithuania

History
- Abandoned: 14th century

Site notes
- Excavation dates: 1859, 1979, 1980–1983
- Condition: In ruins

UNESCO World Heritage Site
- Official name: Kernavė Archaeological Site (Cultural Reserve of Kernavė)
- Criteria: Cultural: iii, iv
- Reference: 1137
- Inscription: 2004 (28th Session)
- Area: 194.4 ha (480 acres)
- Buffer zone: 2,455.2 ha (6,067 acres)

Kernavė was a medieval capital of the Grand Duchy of Lithuania and today is a tourist attraction and an archeological site (population 238, 2021). It is located in the Širvintos district municipality located in southeast Lithuania. A Lithuanian state cultural reserve was established in Kernavė in 1989. In 2004 Kernavė Archaeological Site was included into UNESCO World Heritage list.

== Geographic information ==
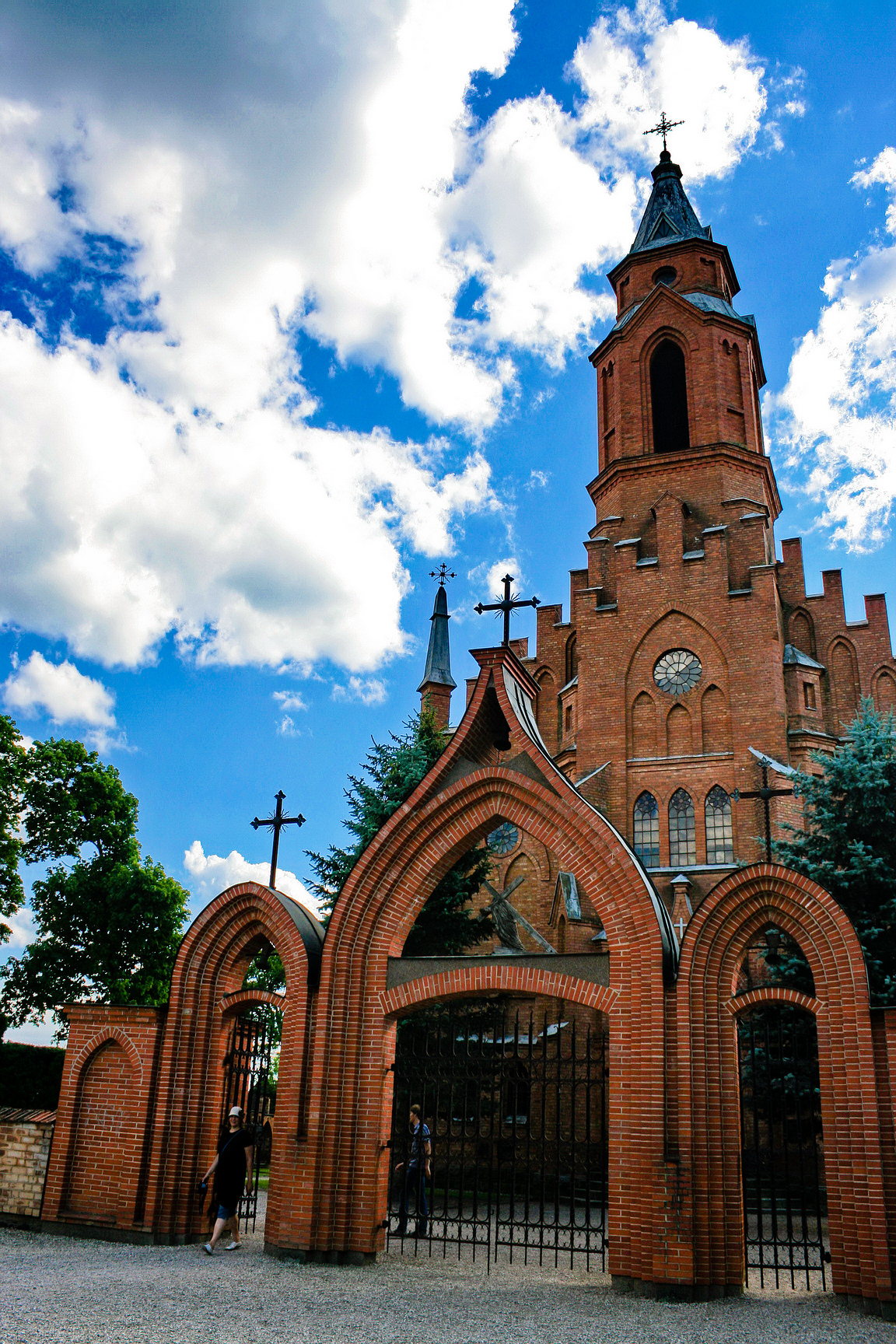
Kernavė Church, built in 1920

Kernavė is a small town in the southeastern part of Lithuania, in Širvintos district, located on the right bank of the river Neris, on the upper Neris terrace. It is 21 kilometers (13 mi) distance from Širvintos and 35 kilometers (22 mi) from Vilnius. It is close to the Vilnius-Kaunas (18 km or 11 mi) and Vilnius-Panevėžys (17 km or 11 mi) highways. It is possible to travel to Kernavė from Vilnius by the Neris River.

== Alternative names ==
Its alternative names include Kernavos, Kernovo, Kiernowo, Kiernów (Polish), and Kernuvke (Yiddish).

== History ==
The area of Kernavė was sparsely inhabited at the end of the Paleolithic era, with the number of settlements significantly increasing in the Mesolithic and Neolithic eras.

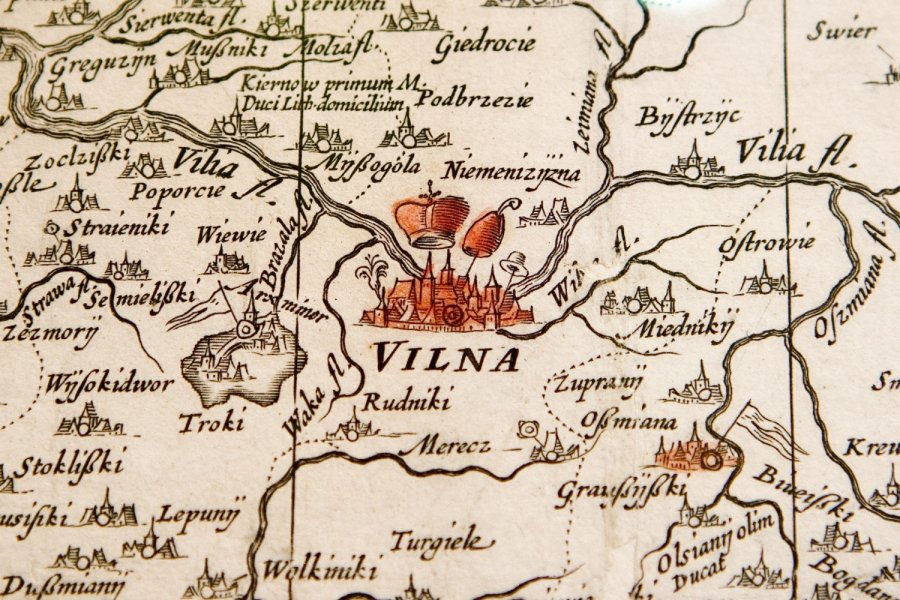
A fragment from the early 17th-century Radziwiłł map of the Grand Duchy of Lithuania where Kernavė is marked as "Kiernow primum M. Duci Lith. domicilium" (English: Kernavė, the first residence-capital of the Grand Dukes of Lithuania), shown just north of the capital Vilnius (Vilna)

The town was the first capital of Lithuania, a symbol of statehood and pagan independence.

The town was first mentioned in 1279 in written sources, when, as the seat of the Grand Duke Traidenis, it was besieged by the Teutonic Knights. This military operation is mentioned in the Livonian Rhymed Chronicle (with the same passage repeated by Hermann von Wartberge in Cronicon Livoniale). In 1390, during the Lithuanian Civil War (1389–1392), the knights burned the town and its buildings in the Pajauta valley, including the castle. After this raid, the town wasn't rebuilt, and the remaining residents moved to the top of the hill instead of staying in the valley.

In later years, the remains of the city were covered with an alluvial layer, that formed wet peat. It preserved most of the relics intact, and it is a treasure trove for archaeologists, leading some to call Kernavė the "Troy of Lithuania". For example, Kernavė has the oldest known medgrinda, a secret underwater road paved with wood. The road was used for defense and dates from the fourth through the seventh centuries.

In 1613, the town was marked on a famous map of the Grand Duchy of Lithuania — Magni Ducatus Lithuaniae, et Regionum Adiacentium exacta Descriptio printed in Amsterdam and financed by the Polish-Lithuanian magnate Mikołaj Krzysztof "the Orphan" Radziwiłł.

The site became the subject of wider interest again in the middle of 19th century, when a romantic writer, Feliks Bernatowicz, depicted the area in his novel "Pojata, córka Lizdejki" ("Pajauta, Daughter of Lizdeika", Warsaw, 1826). The hillforts were soon excavated by the Tyszkiewicz brothers and then by Władysław Syrokomla (1859). After World War II, the excavation works were restarted by Vilnius University in 1979, and then again by the Lithuanian Institute of History between 1980 and 1983. The State Cultural Reserve of Kernavė was created in 2003.

== Architecture ==
=== The church ===
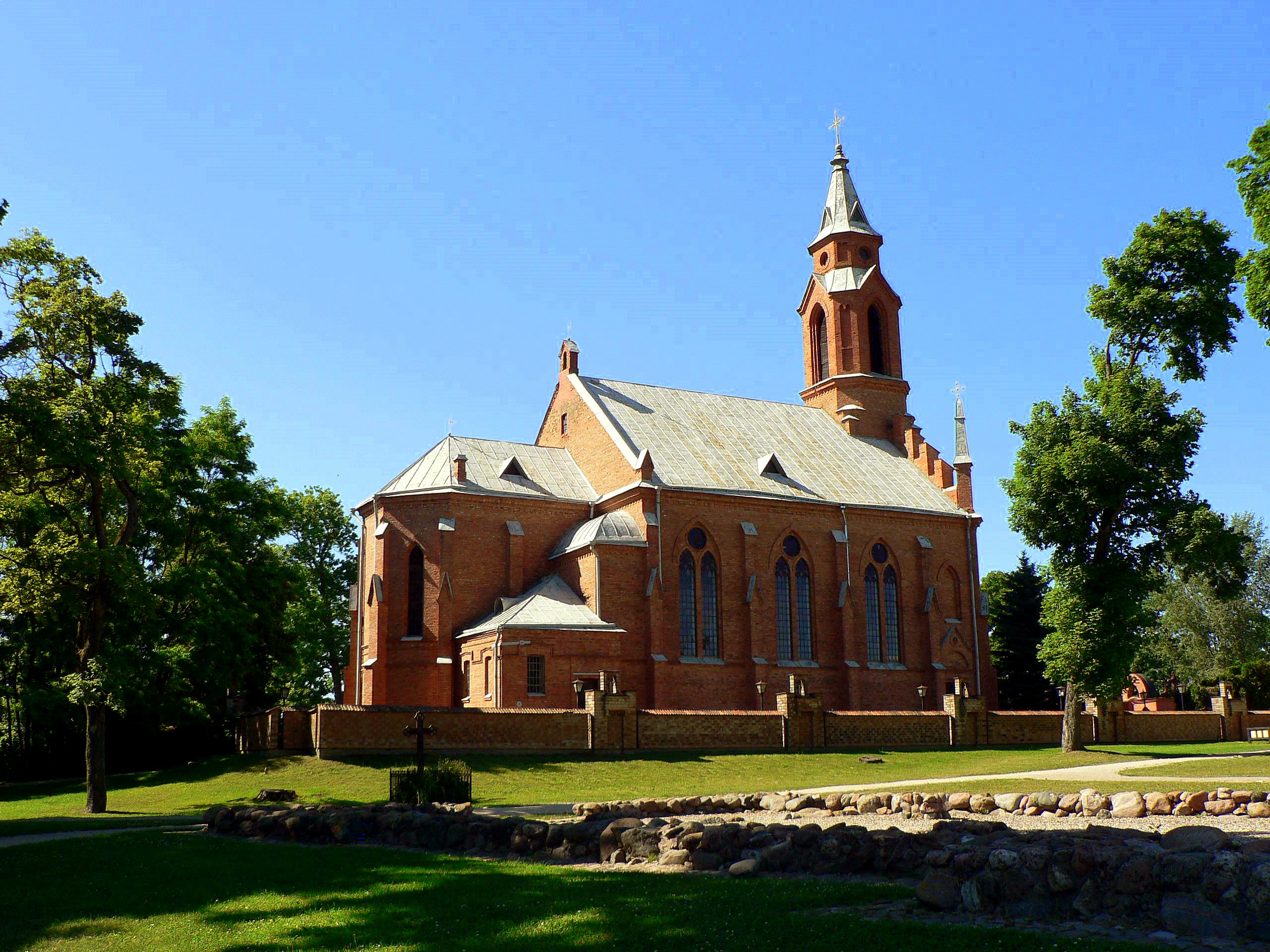
The new church and the foundations of the old church

Next to the present-day church is the churchyard of the old churches. The foundations of the church built in 1739 have been excavated. This wooden church was moved in 1935 to Krivonys. A concrete monument with a cross erected in 1930 during the celebrations of the 500th anniversary of Vytautas death serves as a reminder of the Vytautas Church built in 1420.

In the grounds of the ancient churches, from the 15th to the 19th century, the people of Kernavė were buried. Two chapels stand nearby. The wooden chapel is an example of folk architecture. It is believed that it was built at the end of the 13th century on the Kernavelė estate, and moved to the Kernavė church. At the end of the 19th century the church used it as a storehouse. In 1920 a new church was built, and the chapel staffed to decay, since it was no longer part of the church. In 1959 it was repaired, and in 1993–1994 restored. The building belongs to the Kernavė parish. It is used to display exhibits of wooden church sculptures.

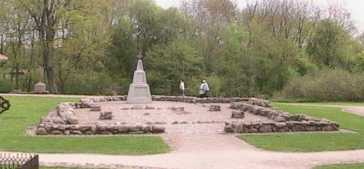
The foundations of the old church

The brick chapel from the 19th century houses the mausoleum of the Romer (Riomeriai) family. It was built in 1851–1856 by the landowner Stanisław Romer. The chapel is built of brick and plaster, and is an example of late classicism. It is small and has an octagonal plan, which is unusual for classicism. Inside, there is an opening in the floor which leads to the crypt. Coffins were bricked into its niches. Inside the chapel the altar's mensa, built of stone, has survived. Along the side walls there are black benches. Memorial plaques with the coat of arms and names of the members of the Riomeriai family are attached to the walls. After the First World War the chapel was neglected. It was repaired in 1959 and 1987. At the present time the chapel belongs to the Kernavė parish.

Both chapels are situated in the Kernavė archaeological and historical reservation. The present-day church was built between 1910 and 1920. Neo-Gothic elements are dominant in the architecture.

During the 1980s, on the initiative of Monsignor Česlovas Krivaitis, the churchyard was repaired, new gates were built and the altar and interior were restored. The churchyard is decorated with Stations of the Cross, arranged by the artist Jadvyga Grisiūtė. In the churchyard there are two monuments built to commemorate the 600th anniversary of Christianisation and the 700th anniversary of the first mention in written sources of the name of Kernavė. The first monument depicts a hearth and a sword, the transition from Paganism to Christianity; the second, a knight with a sword standing between the city gates, the main part of the town's coat of arms. Millstones are incorporated into the structures of both monuments. The grave of the priest, writer and promoter of the history of Kernavė, Nikodemas Švogžlys-Milžinas is near the monument commemorating the 700th anniversary of Kernavė.

In the church there are several valuable pieces of art. The altar, two paintings, two sculptures, a small altar, three glasses and the bell are listed. The Neo-baroque altar is in the side nave. In its center is the painting Maria, on its sides are columns and sculptures of Saint Peter and Saint Paul. Another five smaller sculptures depict Mary, two angels and two saints. All the sculptures belong to the Baroque style. The polychromatic architectural details of the altar are imitation marble, their features are bronze.

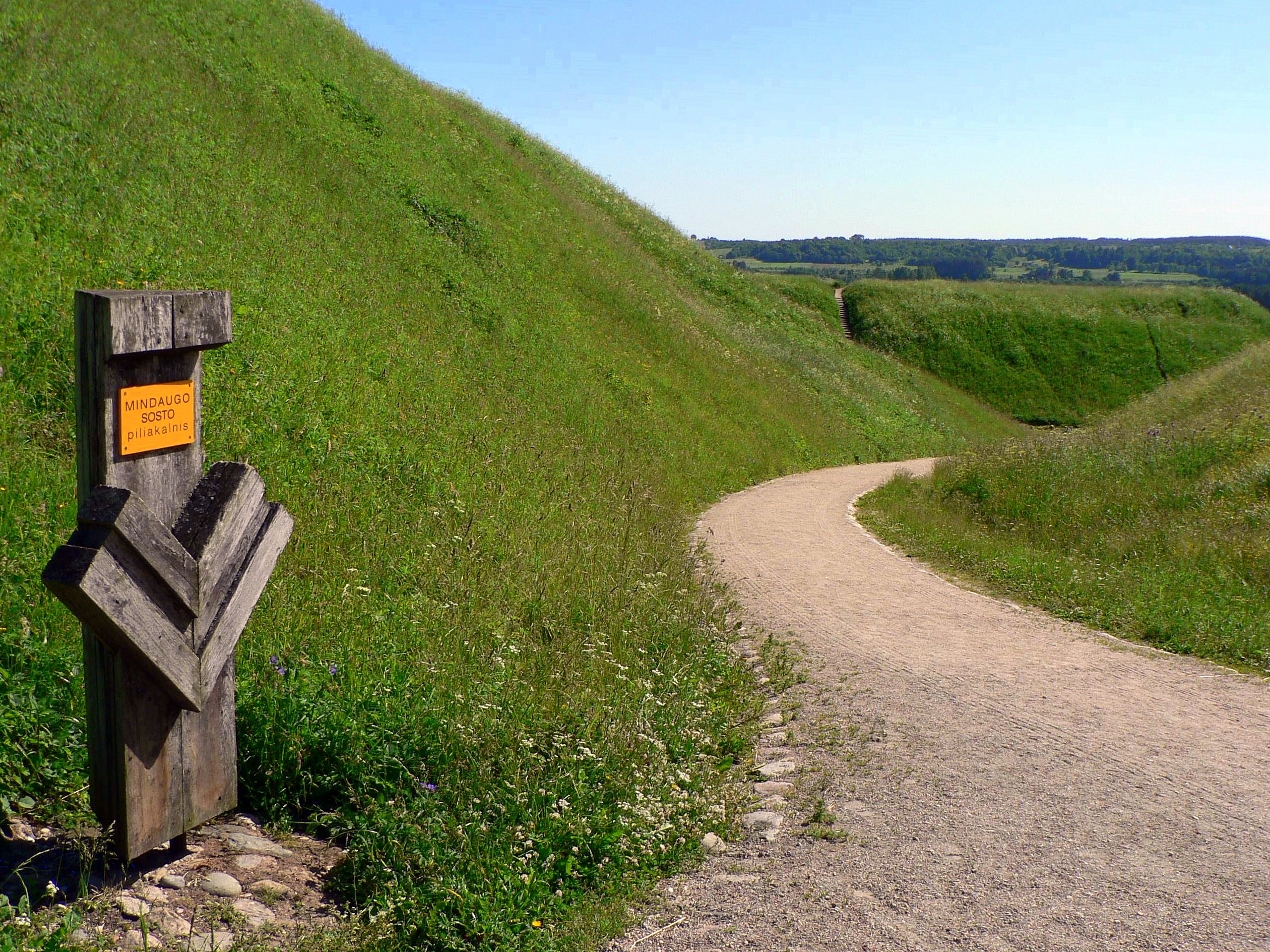
Between the Kernavė hillforts, at the feet of "Mindaugas Throne"

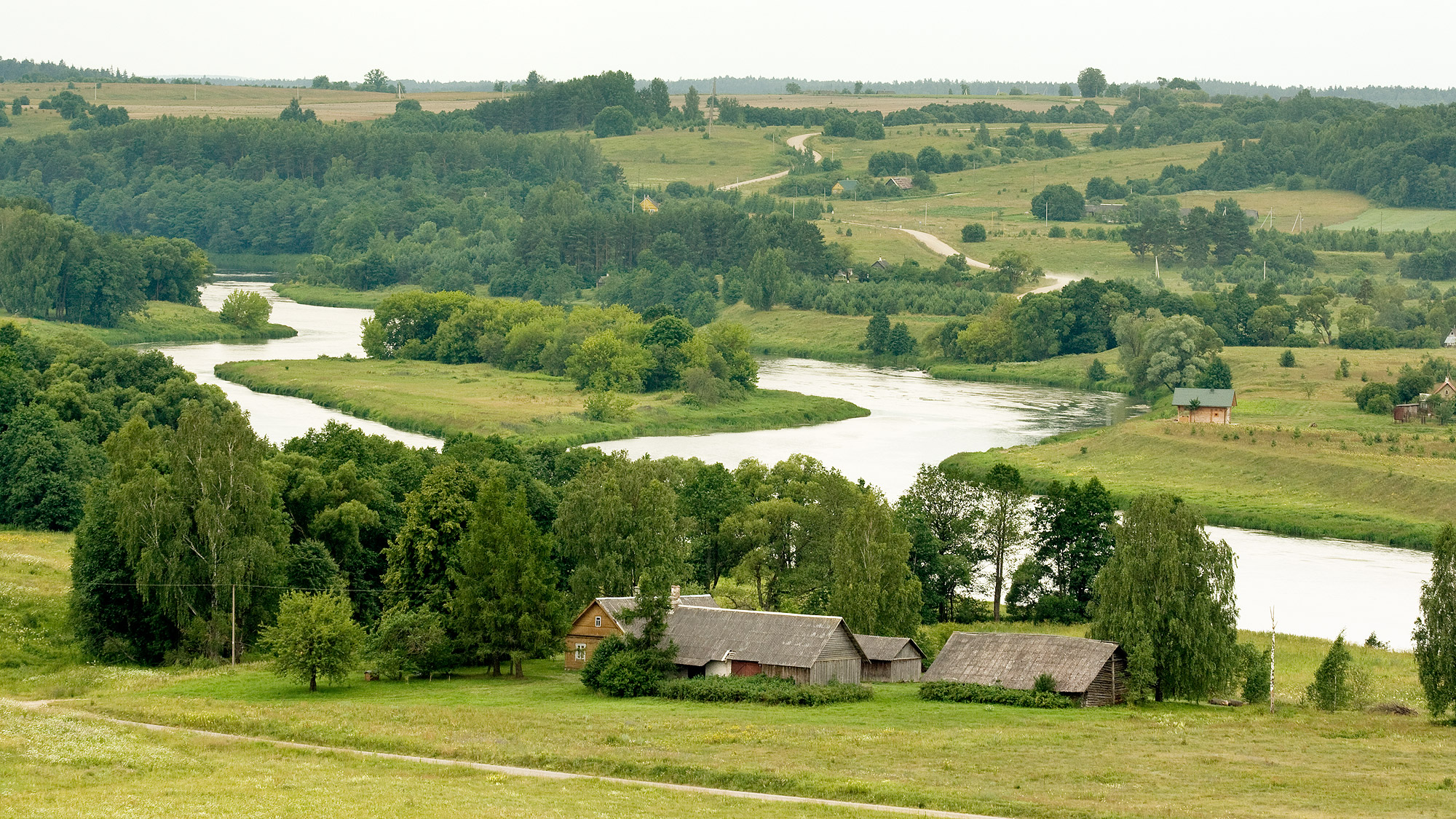
River Neris near Kernavė

The painting Marija Škaplierinė (canvas, oil, metal, 220 cm × 120 cm or 87 in × 47 in) is on the altar in the central nave. It was painted in 1816 and depicts the Mother and Child, God the Father, and the Holy Spirit (a dove). The painting The Holy Family (canvas, oil, 143 cm × 104 cm or 56 in × 41 in) comes from the 18th century. The painting shows the Mother and Child and a lamb. In the background is Saint Joseph; above are angels. The composition is asymmetric, and has several lines of perspective.

Other pieces of art include a small altar from the early 19th century, two glasses from the beginning of the 19th century, one glass from the beginning of the 18th century, and a bell from the 17th century. The bell is made of brass, 45 centimeters (18 in) in diameter, cast in Vilnius in 1667. In the 1980s, thanks to the efforts of Monsignor Ceslovas Krivaitis, a non-traditional presbytery was constructed, and the surroundings were cleaned up.

In the presbytery is an exhibition of the way of life of parishioners, and historic and holy relics. In 1987 a museum of sacramental relics was opened in the old presbytery building. At the parish hall the pre-war sculpture of the Iron Wolf has been rebuilt. The cultural activities of the church contribute much to the general historical and cultural life of Kernavė. A wide pavement leads from the town centre to the church. The State Kernavė Archaeological Historical Museum and the district office have moved into the cultural center (architect A. Alekna).

=== Primary school ===
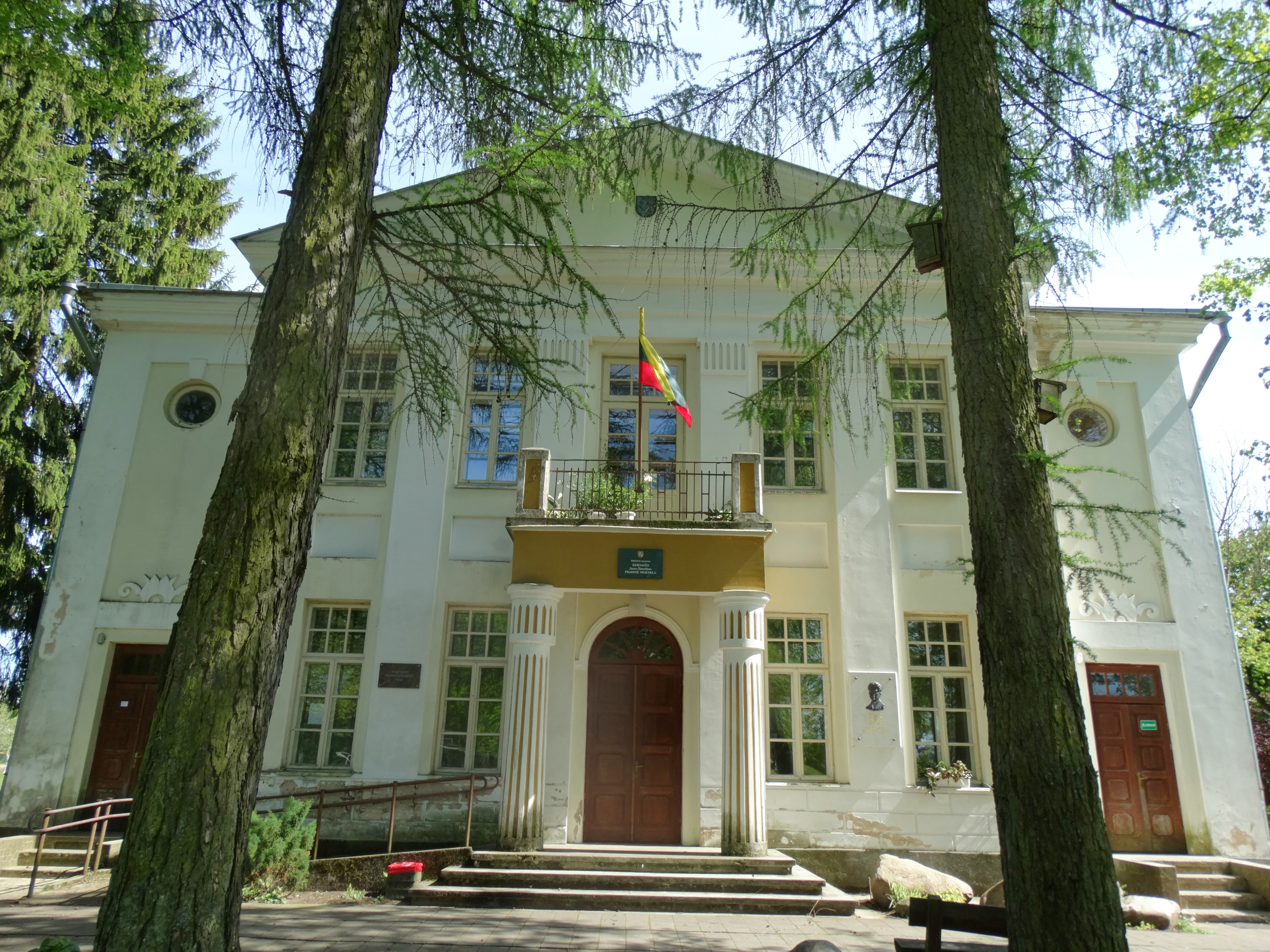
A school building in Kernavė

The Kernavė Primary School is a two-story building built in 1929. Here, on 28 December 1930, the teacher Juozas Šiaučiūnas opened the first exhibition of the museum. He devoted his life to educational and cultural work at this school until his deportation on 14 June 1941 by the Soviets. He died in Siberia on 17 October 1943. In 1998 the school was repaired and restored. In 1998, by decision of the Board of the Širvintos District, the Kernavė primary school was given the name of Juozas Šiaučiūnas. In 1999 the school, and in the year 2000 the Kernavė museum, celebrated their 70th anniversaries of their foundation.

The old architecture of Kernavė is best preserved in Vilnius and Kriveikiškio streets. In the central part of the town, the buildings are mainly from the postwar period. To the south of the town is the Archaeological and Historical Reservation.

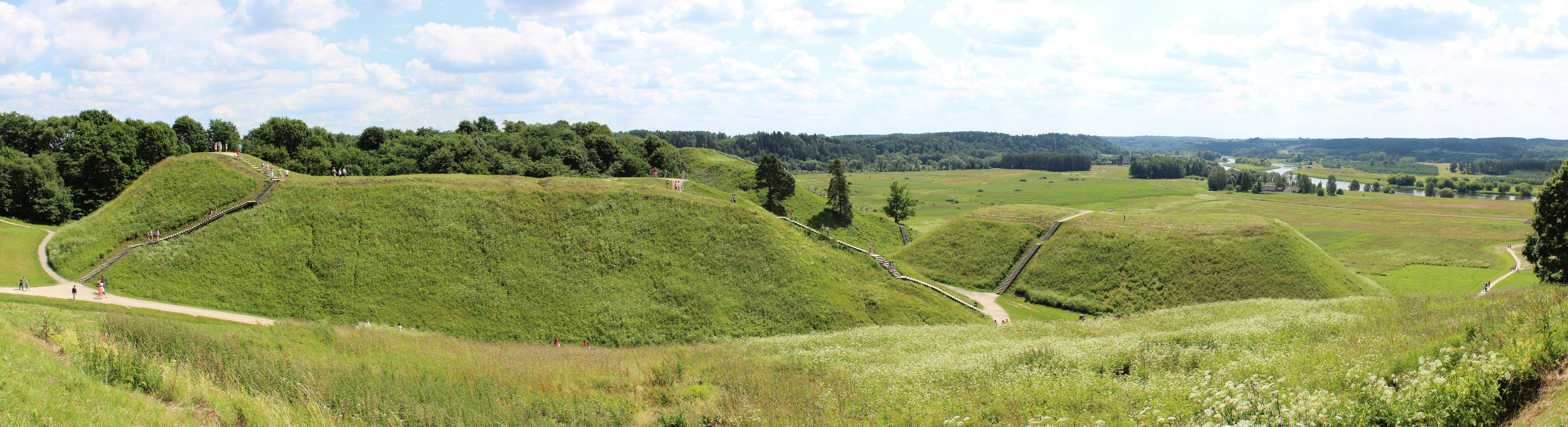
The panorama of Pajauta valley, the hillforts and Neris near Kernavė

== Tourism information ==
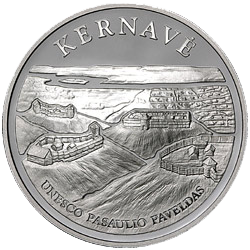
Litas commemorative coin dedicated to Kernavė

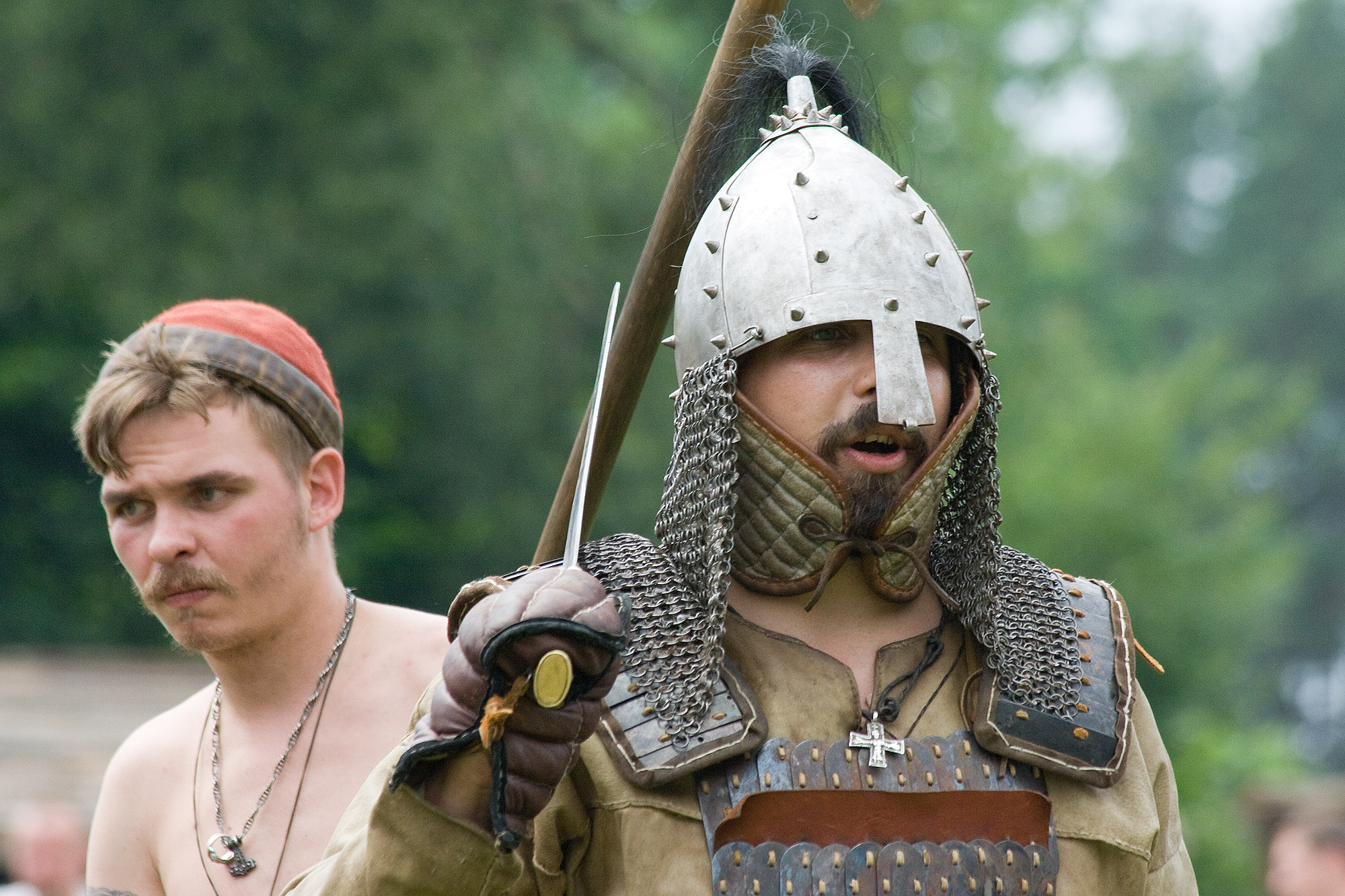
Medieval re-enactments during International Festival of Experimental Archaeology, 5–7 July 2008

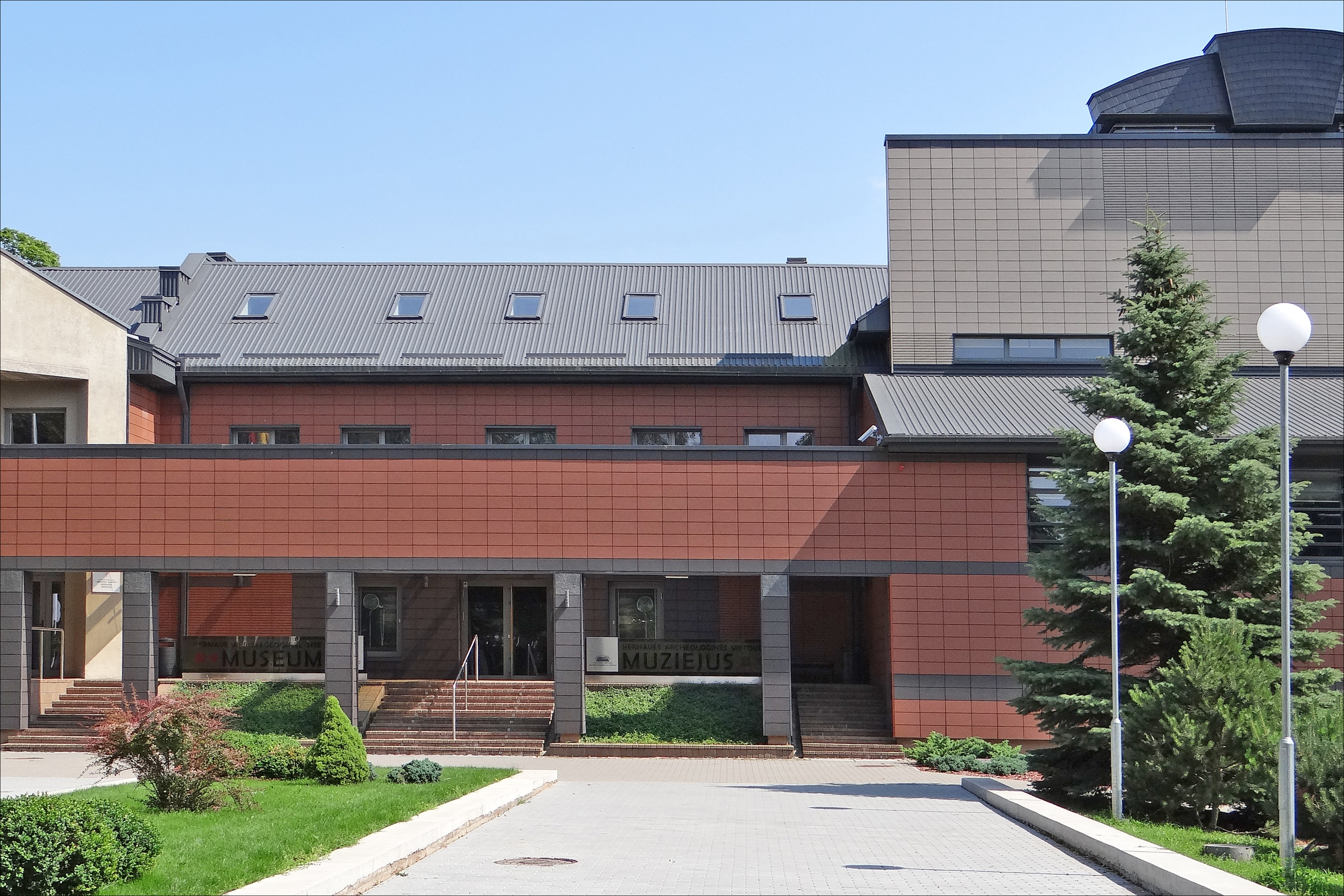
Kernavė archeological museum

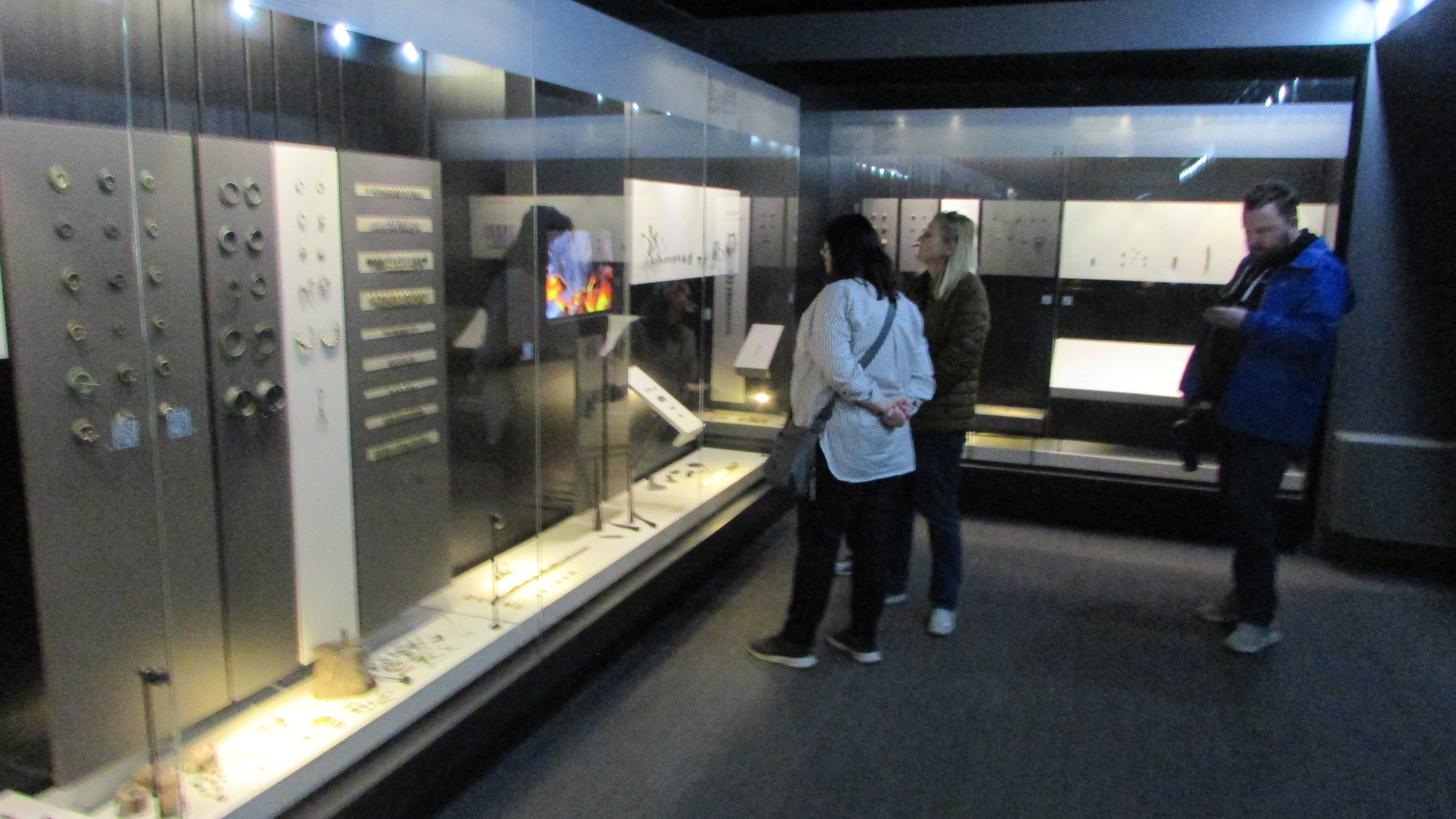
Inside the Kernavė museum

Tourists can find the latest information about events and surrounding tourist attractions at Kernavė tourist information bureau. In summer Kernavė comes to life. Celebrations and folk festivals are organized. Archaeological expeditions have been held for more than 20 years, in which Lithuanian and foreign archaeologists, students, and school children take part.

Kernavė is also known for its traditional Rasa festivals. As early as 1967 a group of university students held the very first Rasa festival, which later became a tradition. For several decades it was not only a way to clean the soul, but also to protest against the humiliation of national consciousness and the forced implantation of Soviet traditions. Attempts to prohibit this festival were not successful.

Kernavė is known for national celebrations of Mindaugas coronation day on 6 July. On that day a festival is held, where medieval authentic crafts, war games and folk music are presented. The craftsmen come from around the Baltics and neighboring countries.

== See also ==
- History of Lithuania
- Vilnius
- Trakai
- Voruta
