= Luokesa Eldership =

Eldership of Lithuania

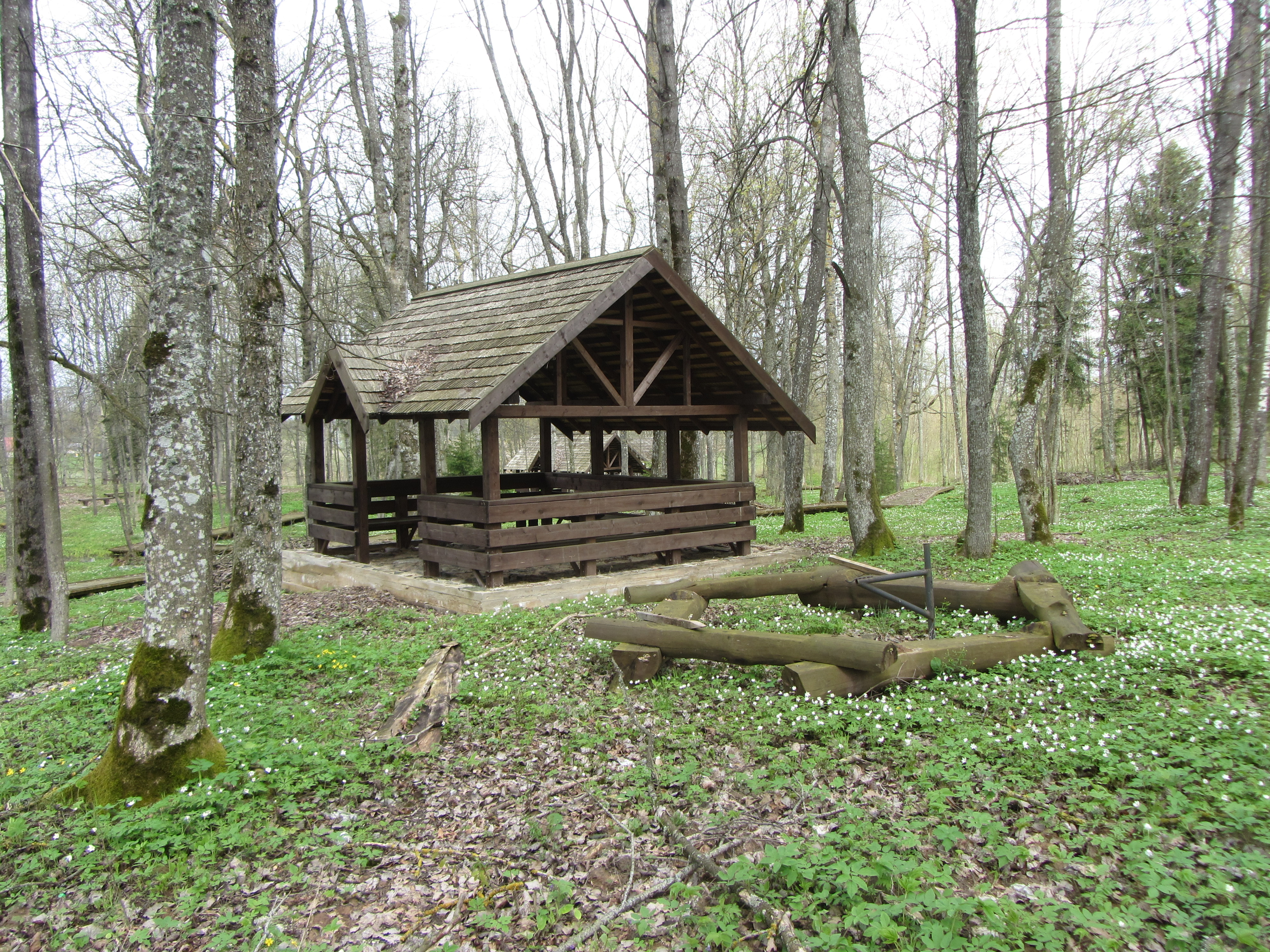
Luokesos sen., Lithuania

The Luokesa Eldership (Lithuanian: Luokesos seniūnija) is an eldership of Lithuania, located in the Molėtai District Municipality. In 2021 its population was 1208.
