= Antonovo, Kubenskoye Rural Settlement, Vologodsky District, Vologda Oblast =

Antonovo Антоново
- Village
- Location within Vologda Oblast Location within Russia
- Coordinates: 59°23′N 39°19′E
- Country: Russia
- Region: Vologda Oblast
- District: Vologodsky District
- Time zone: UTC+3:00

Antonovo (Russian: Антоново) is a rural locality (a village) in Kubenskoye Rural Settlement, Vologodsky District, Vologda Oblast, Russia. The population was 3 as of 2002.

== Geography ==
The distance to Vologda is 59 km, to Kubenskoye is 20 km. Nizhneye, Vepri, Bogoslovo are the nearest rural localities.
