= Debeikiai Eldership =

Eldership of Lithuania

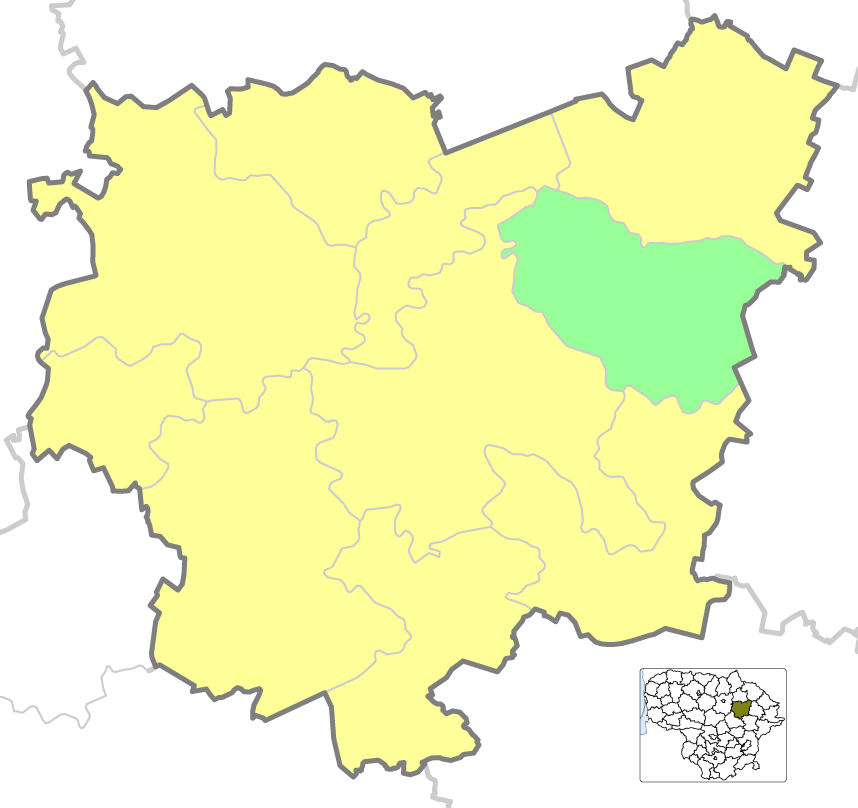
Location of Debeikiai Eldership in Anykščiai District Municipality

The Debeikiai Eldership (Lithuanian: Debeikių seniūnija) is an eldership of Lithuania, located in the Anykščiai District Municipality. In 2021 its population was 1458.
