= Sidabravas Eldership =

Eldership of Lithuania

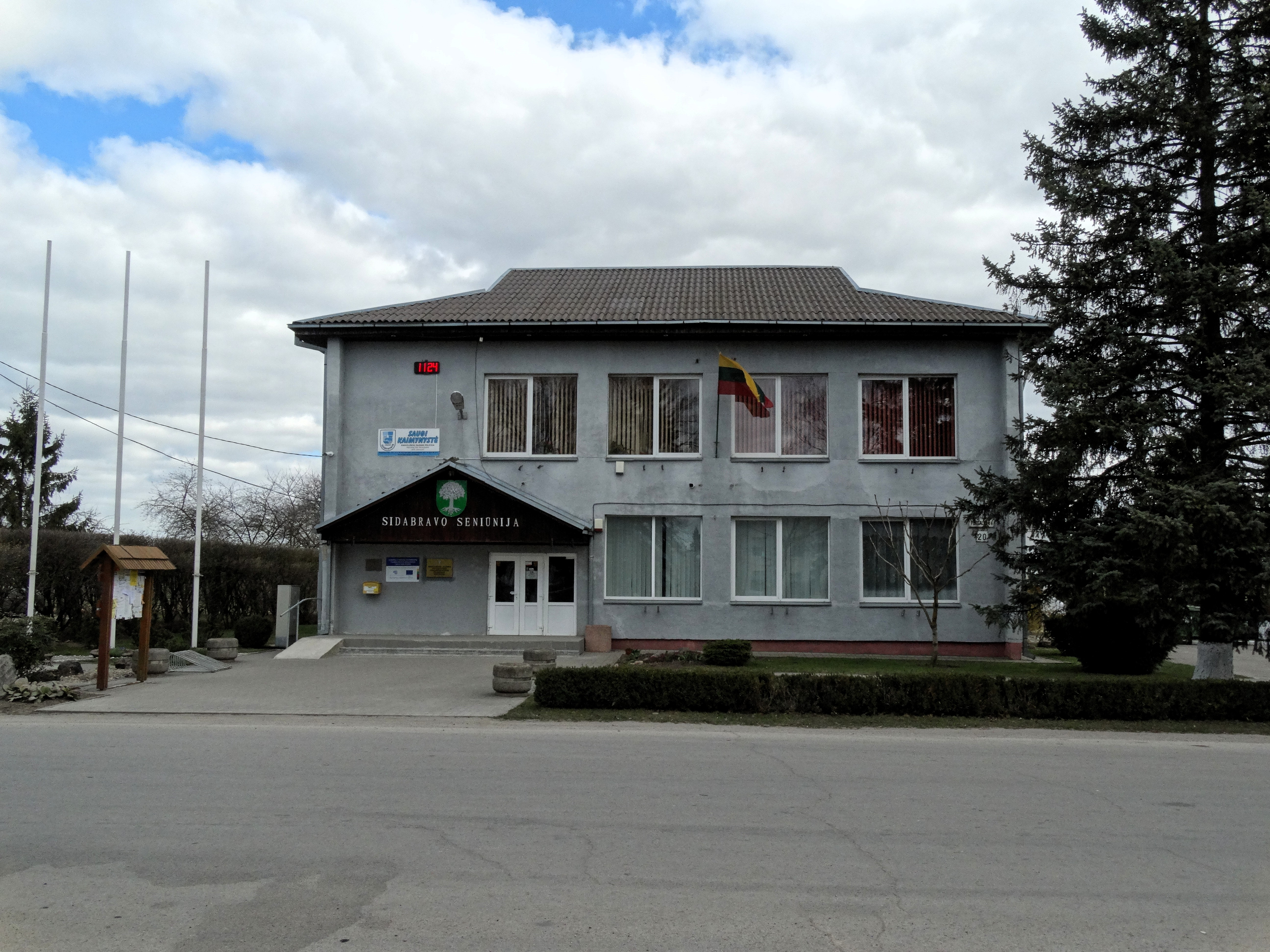
Eldership, Sidabravas, Radviliškis District, Lithuania

The Sidabravas Eldership (Lithuanian: Sidabravo seniūnija) is an eldership of Lithuania, located in the Radviliškis District Municipality. In 2021 its population was 1342.
