= Balninkai Eldership =

Eldership of Lithuania

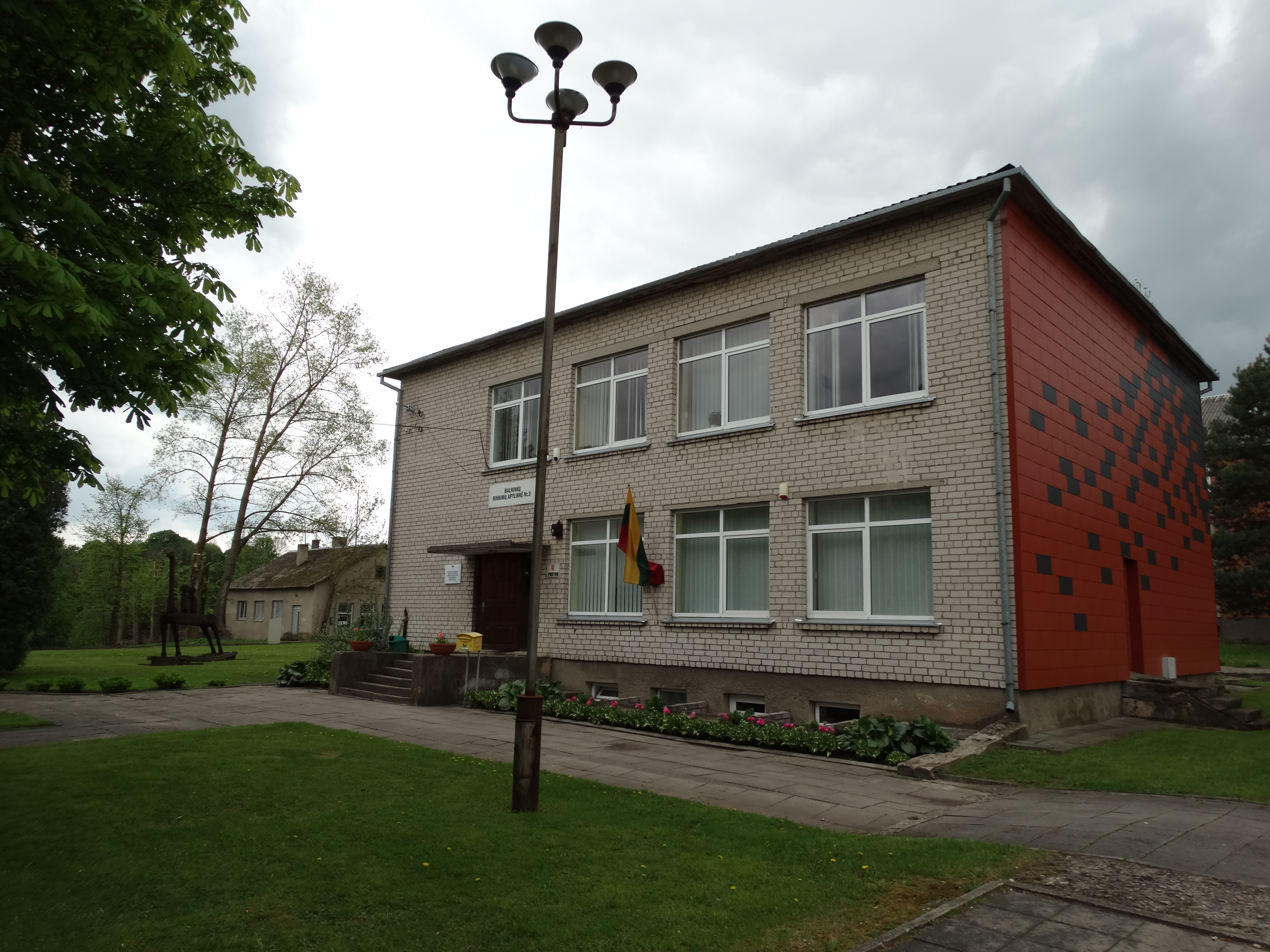
Balninkai eldership

The Balninkai Eldership (Lithuanian: Balninkų seniūnija) is an eldership of Lithuania, located in the Molėtai District Municipality. In 2021 its population was 735.
