= Širvintos District Municipality =

Coordinates: 55°01′59″N 24°55′48″E

Širvintos District Municipality Širvintų rajono savivaldybė
- Municipality
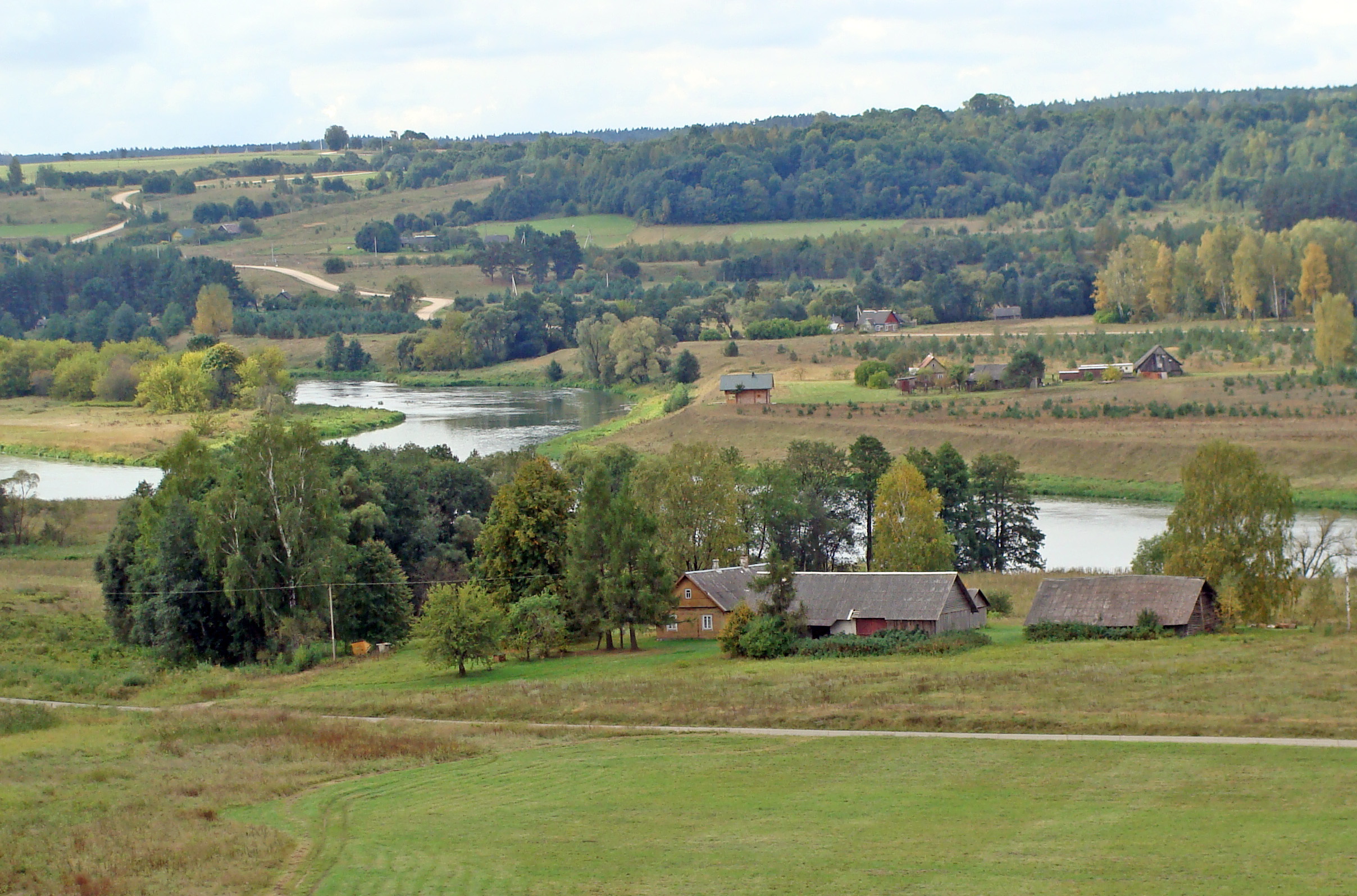
- Neris near Kernavė

- Flag Coat of arms Brandmark

- Location of Širvintos district municipality

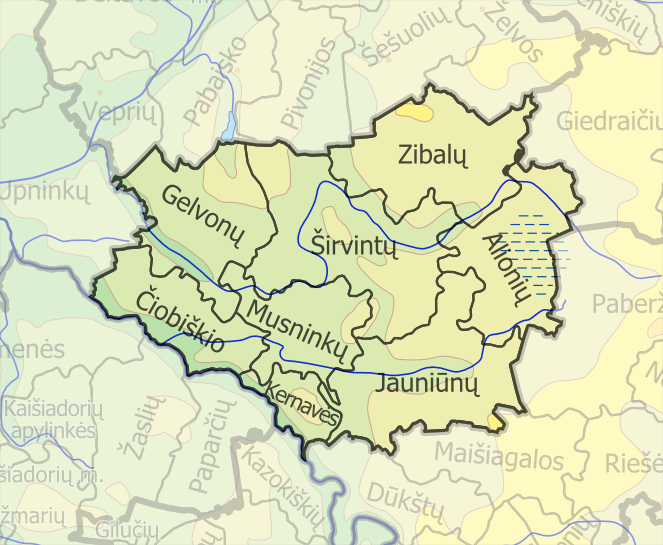
- Map of municipality
- Country: Lithuania
- Ethnographic region: Aukštaitija
- County: Vilnius County
- Capital: Širvintos
- Elderships: List: Alionys I; Čiobiškis; Gelvonai; Jauniūnai; Kernavė; Musninkai; Širvintos; Zibalai

Area
  - Total: 906 km^{2} (350 sq mi)

Population (2021)
  - Total: 15,023
  - Density: 16.6/km^{2} (42.9/sq mi)
- Time zone: UTC+2 (EET)
  - Summer (DST): UTC+3 (EEST)
- Major settlements: Širvintos (pop. 5,734)
- Website: www.sirvintos.lt

Širvintos District Municipality (Lithuanian: Širvintų rajono savivaldybė) is a municipality in Lithuania, it is in territory of Vilnius County and its capital is Širvintos.

== Geography ==
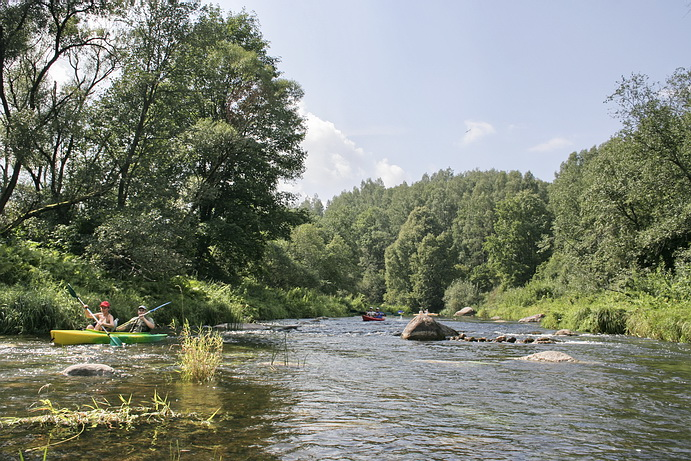
Širvinta River

The territory of the municipality is 906 km^{2}. Širvintos City, 5 towns – Bagaslaviškis, Čiobiškis, Gelvonai, Kernavė, Musninkai and 485 villages are in the municipality. Forests occupy 27.7% of the whole region’s territory.

The biggest rivers of the region are Neris, Širvinta and Musė. There are 28 lakes; the largest of them is Alys, which covers 1.65 km^{2} (0.64 sq mi), and the deepest is Gelvė, which is 25 m (82 ft) deep.

== Heritage ==
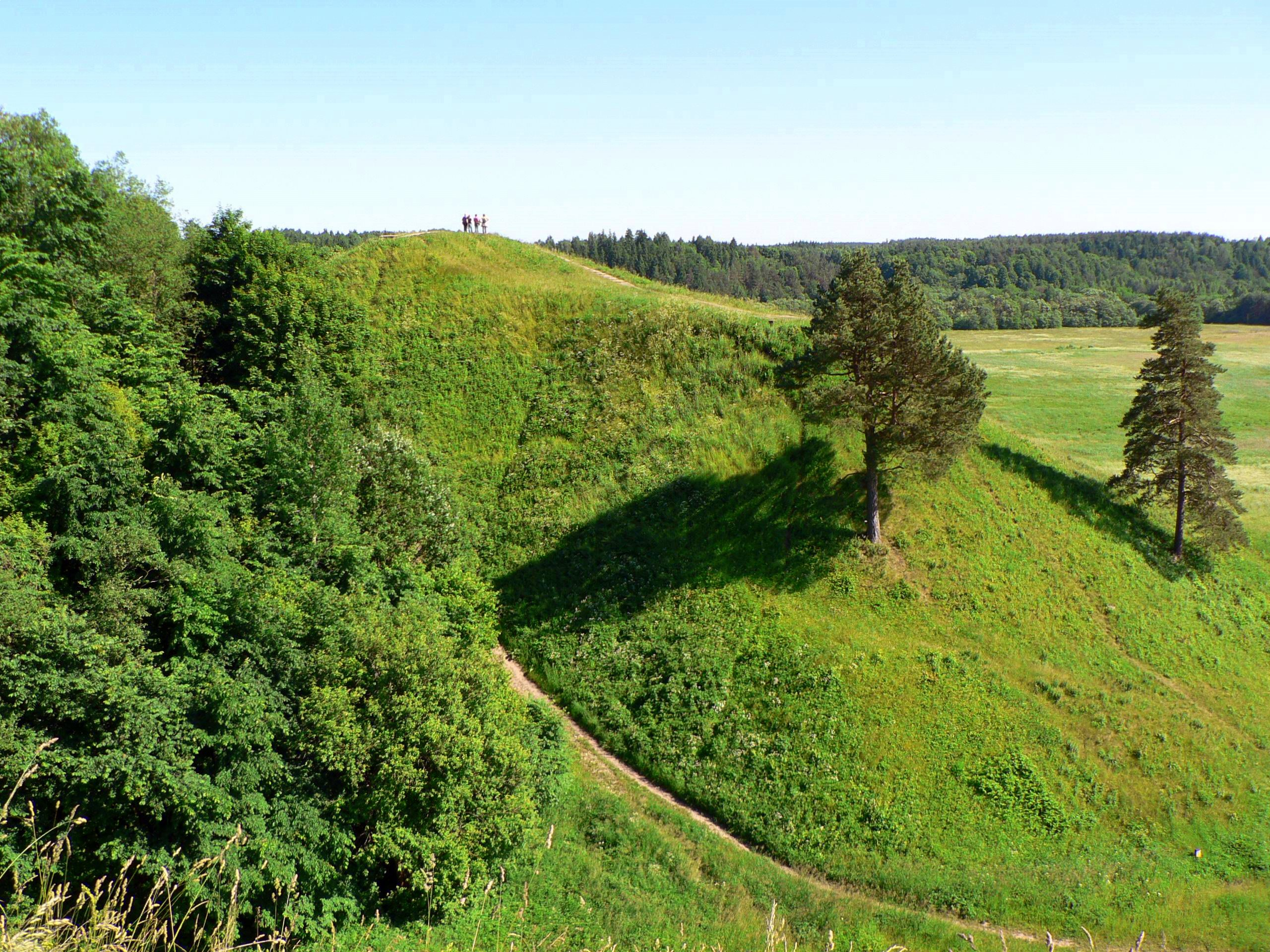
Kernavė mound

In the territory of the region are Kernavė’s Historical Reservation, botanical reserves for growing cranberries in Alionys, Bartkuškis (there's an old castle) and Lygaraistis, 6 parks and 2 nature monuments (Staškiūniškiai Larch and the stone with a “devil’s footprint” in Dūdai). Also there are 50 archaeological monuments, 16 architectural monuments, 15 historical monuments and 78 art monuments, 18 manor houses with parks.

== Population ==
According to the population census of 2001, 20,207 people live in the region: 9,545 men and 10,662 women. 7,273 people live in towns and 12,934 people live in villages. About 10% (2,019 people) declared Polish nationality.

There are 4,982 people of retirement age: 3,433 women and 1,549 men. 11,186 people are employed. 52% of all working people work in state institutions.
