= Vėžaičiai Eldership =

Vėžaičiai Eldership Vėžaičių seniūnija
- Eldership
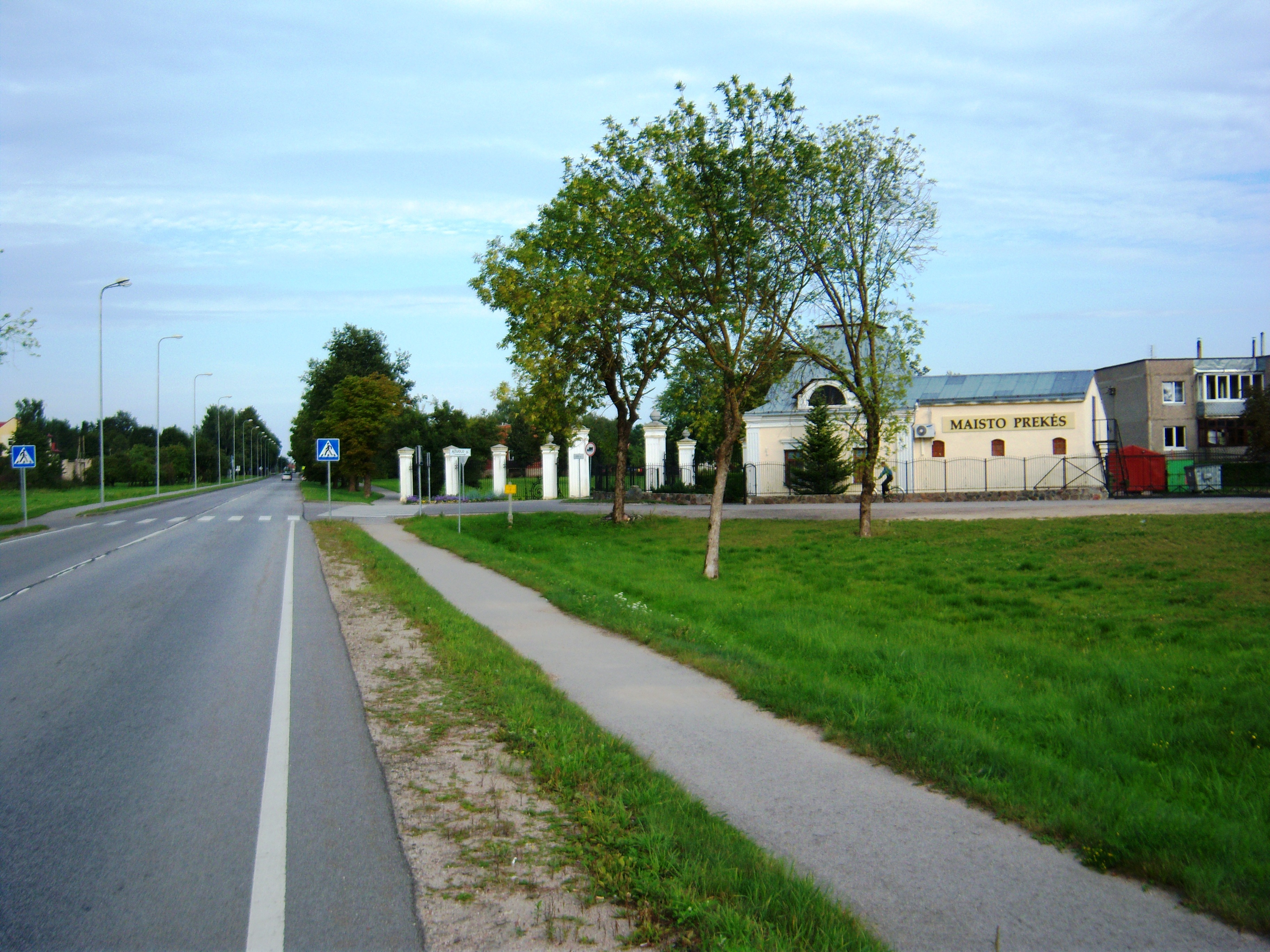
- Street in Vėžaičiai

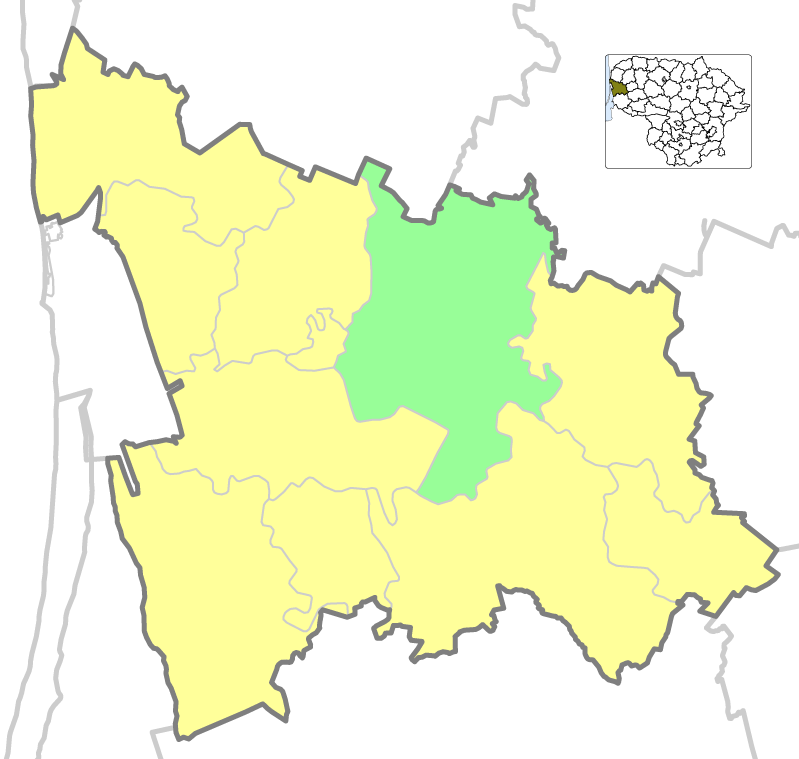
- Location of Vėžaičiai Eldership
- Coordinates: 55.728°N 21.517°E
- Country: Lithuania
- Ethnographic region: Samogitia
- County: Klaipėda County
- Municipality: Klaipėda District Municipality
- Administrative centre: Vėžaičiai

Area
  - Total: 161 km^{2} (62 sq mi)

Population (2021)
  - Total: 3,986
  - Density: 24.8/km^{2} (64.1/sq mi)
- Time zone: UTC+2 (EET)
  - Summer (DST): UTC+3 (EEST)

Vėžaičiai Eldership (Lithuanian: Vėžaičių seniūnija) is a Lithuanian eldership, located in the northern part of Klaipėda District Municipality.
