= Judrėnai Eldership =

Judrėnai Eldership Judrėnų seniūnija
- Eldership
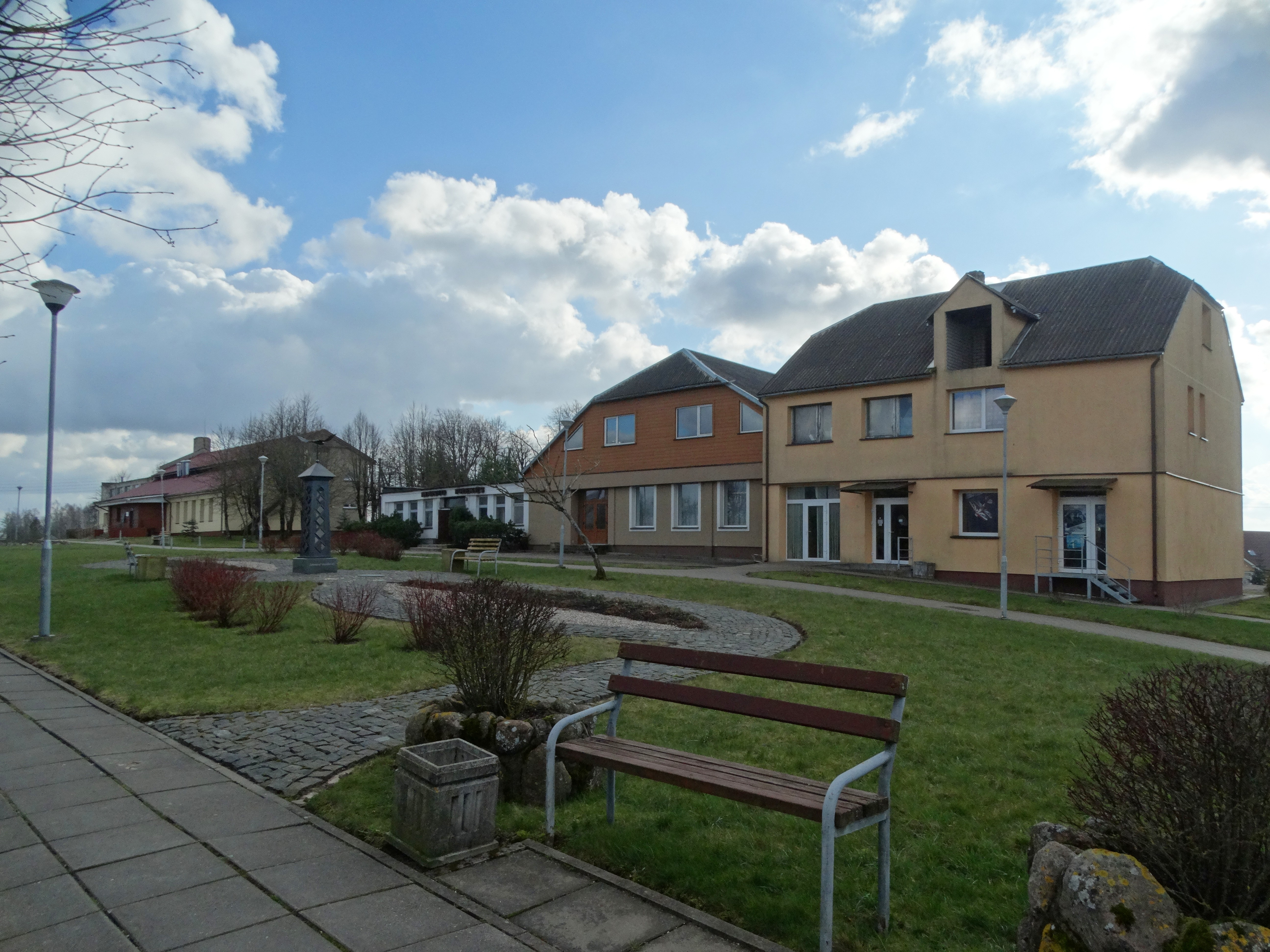
- Center of Judrėnai

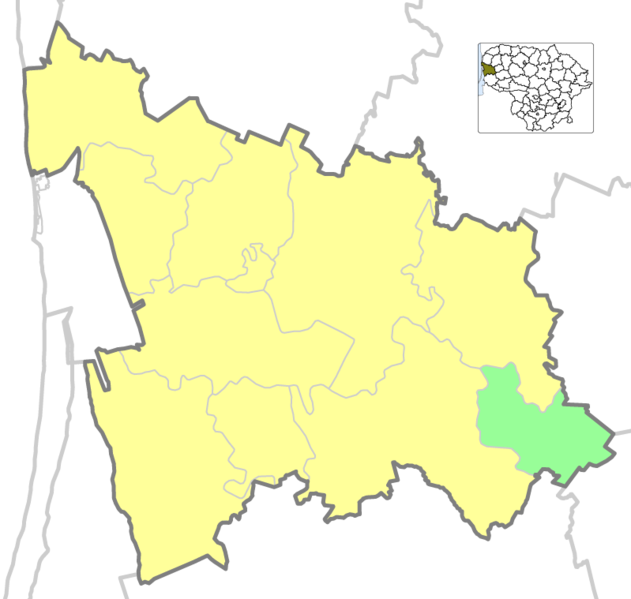
- Location of Judrėnai Eldership
- Coordinates: 55.598°N 21.777°E
- Country: Lithuania
- Ethnographic region: Samogitia
- County: Klaipėda County
- Municipality: Klaipėda District Municipality
- Administrative centre: Judrėnai

Area
  - Total: 64 km^{2} (25 sq mi)

Population (2021)
  - Total: 588
  - Density: 9.2/km^{2} (24/sq mi)
- Time zone: UTC+2 (EET)
  - Summer (DST): UTC+3 (EEST)

Judrėnai Eldership (Lithuanian: Judrėnų seniūnija) is a Lithuanian eldership, located in the eastern part of Klaipėda District Municipality.
