= Endriejavas Eldership =

Endriejavas Eldership Endriejavo seniūnija
- Eldership
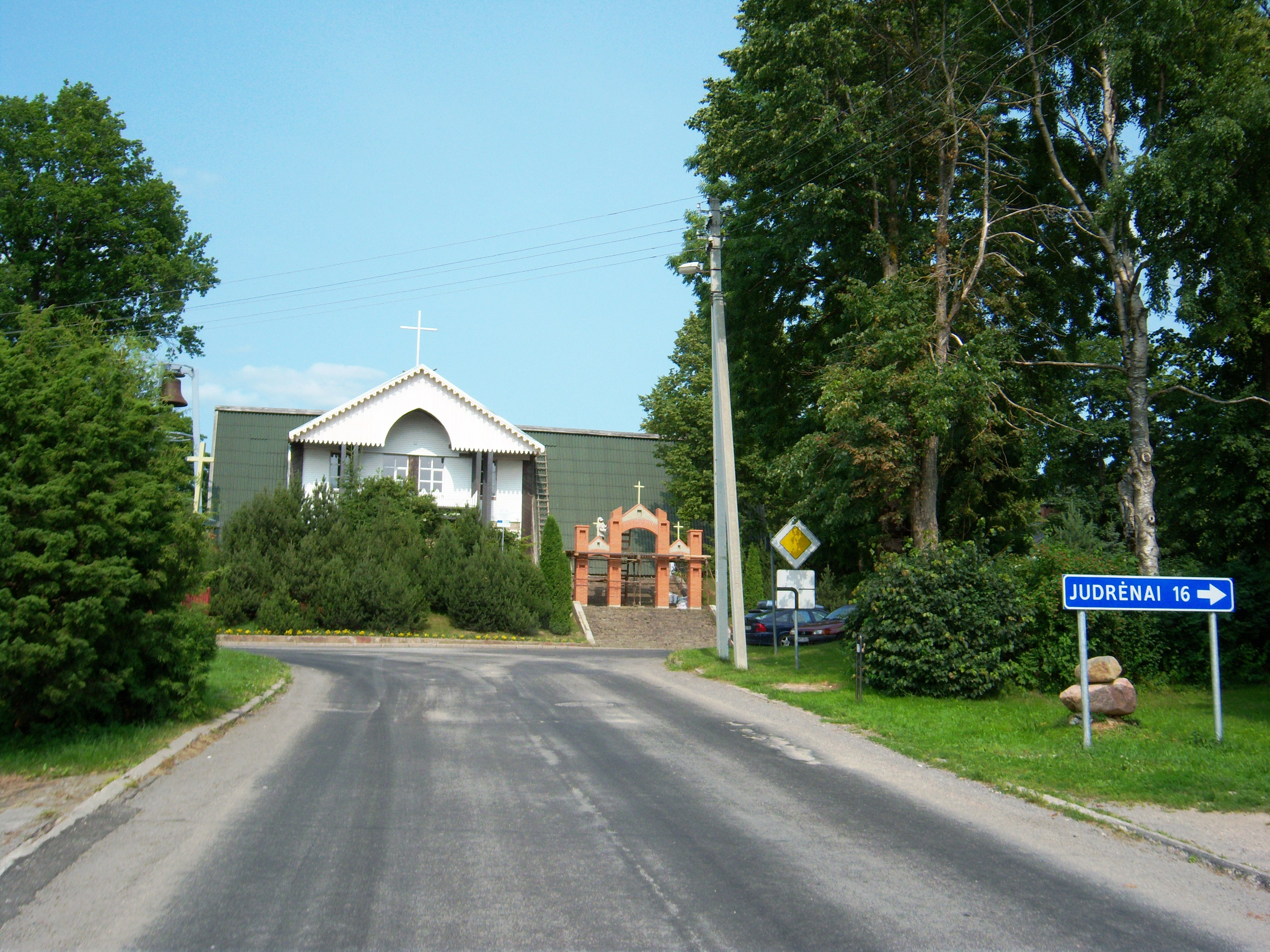
- Street in Endriejavas

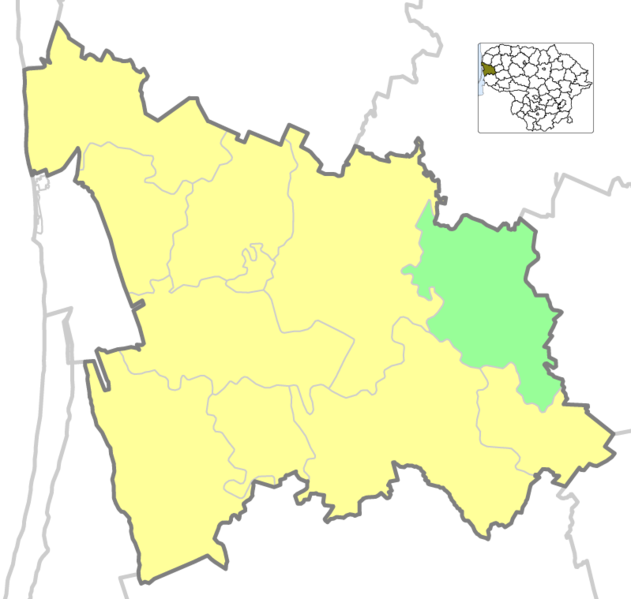
- Location of Endriejavas Eldership
- Coordinates: 55.698°N 21.702°E
- Country: Lithuania
- Ethnographic region: Samogitia
- County: Klaipėda County
- Municipality: Klaipėda District Municipality
- Administrative centre: Endriejavas

Area
  - Total: 145 km^{2} (56 sq mi)

Population (2021)
  - Total: 1,372
  - Density: 9.46/km^{2} (24.5/sq mi)
- Time zone: UTC+2 (EET)
  - Summer (DST): UTC+3 (EEST)

Endriejavas Eldership (Lithuanian: Endriejavo seniūnija) is a Lithuanian eldership, located in the eastern part of Klaipėda District Municipality.
