= Dovilai Eldership =

Dovilai Eldership Dovilų seniūnija
- Eldership
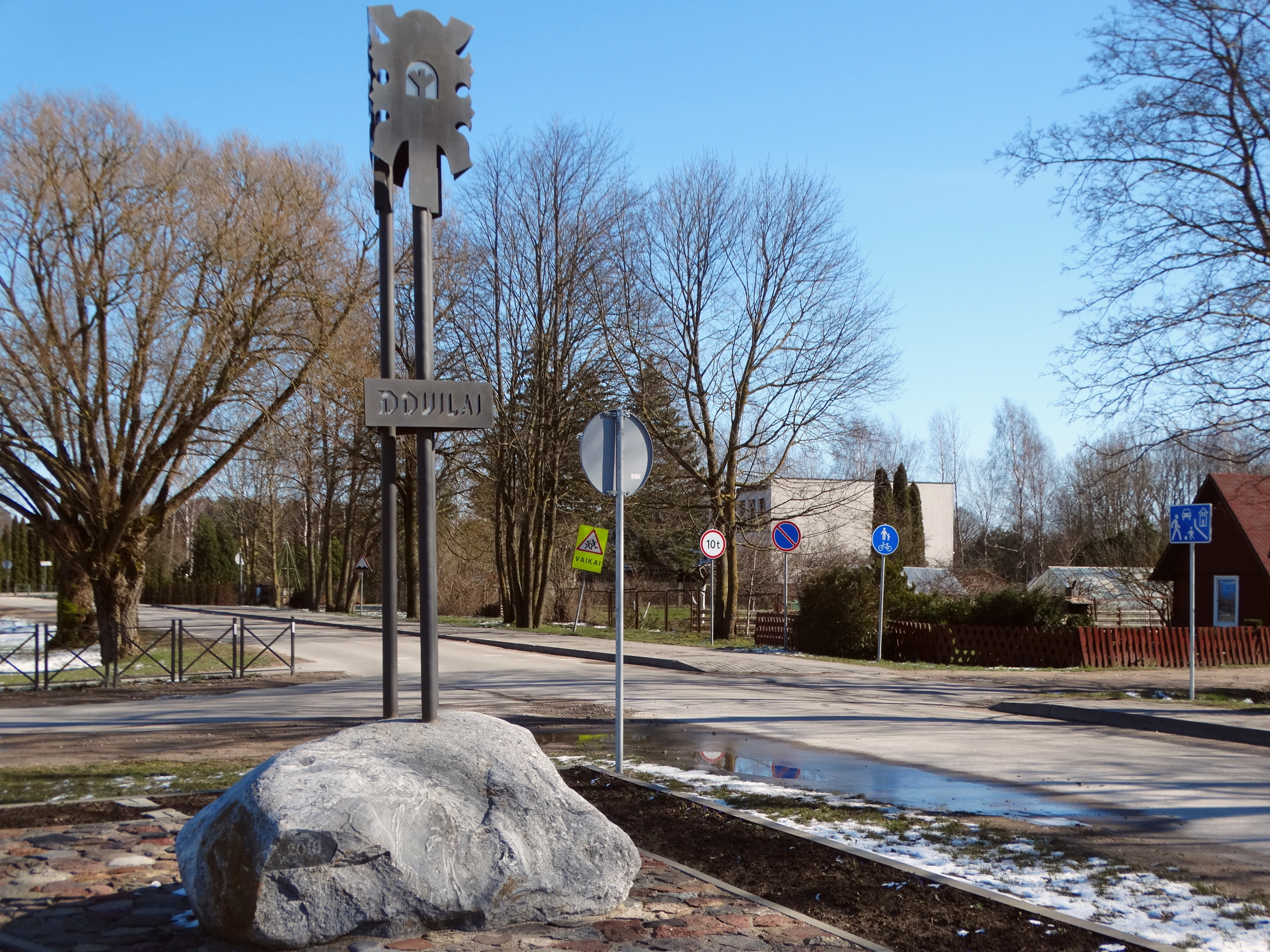
- Street in Dovilai

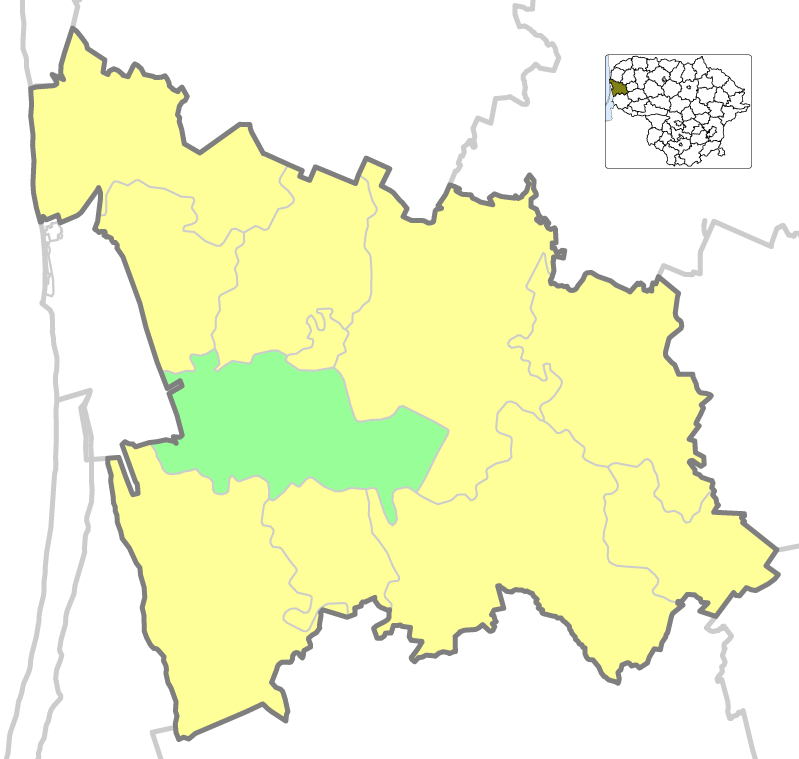
- Location of Doviliai Eldership
- Coordinates: 55.659°N 21.366°E
- Country: Lithuania
- Ethnographic region: Lithuania Minor
- County: Klaipėda County
- Municipality: Klaipėda District Municipality
- Administrative centre: Dovilai

Area
  - Total: 122 km^{2} (47 sq mi)

Population (2021)
  - Total: 5,250
  - Density: 43.0/km^{2} (111/sq mi)
- Time zone: UTC+2 (EET)
  - Summer (DST): UTC+3 (EEST)

Dovilai Eldership (Lithuanian: Dovilų seniūnija) is a Lithuanian eldership, located in the central part of Klaipėda District Municipality.
