= Priekulė Eldership =

Priekulė Eldership Priekulės seniūnija
- Eldership
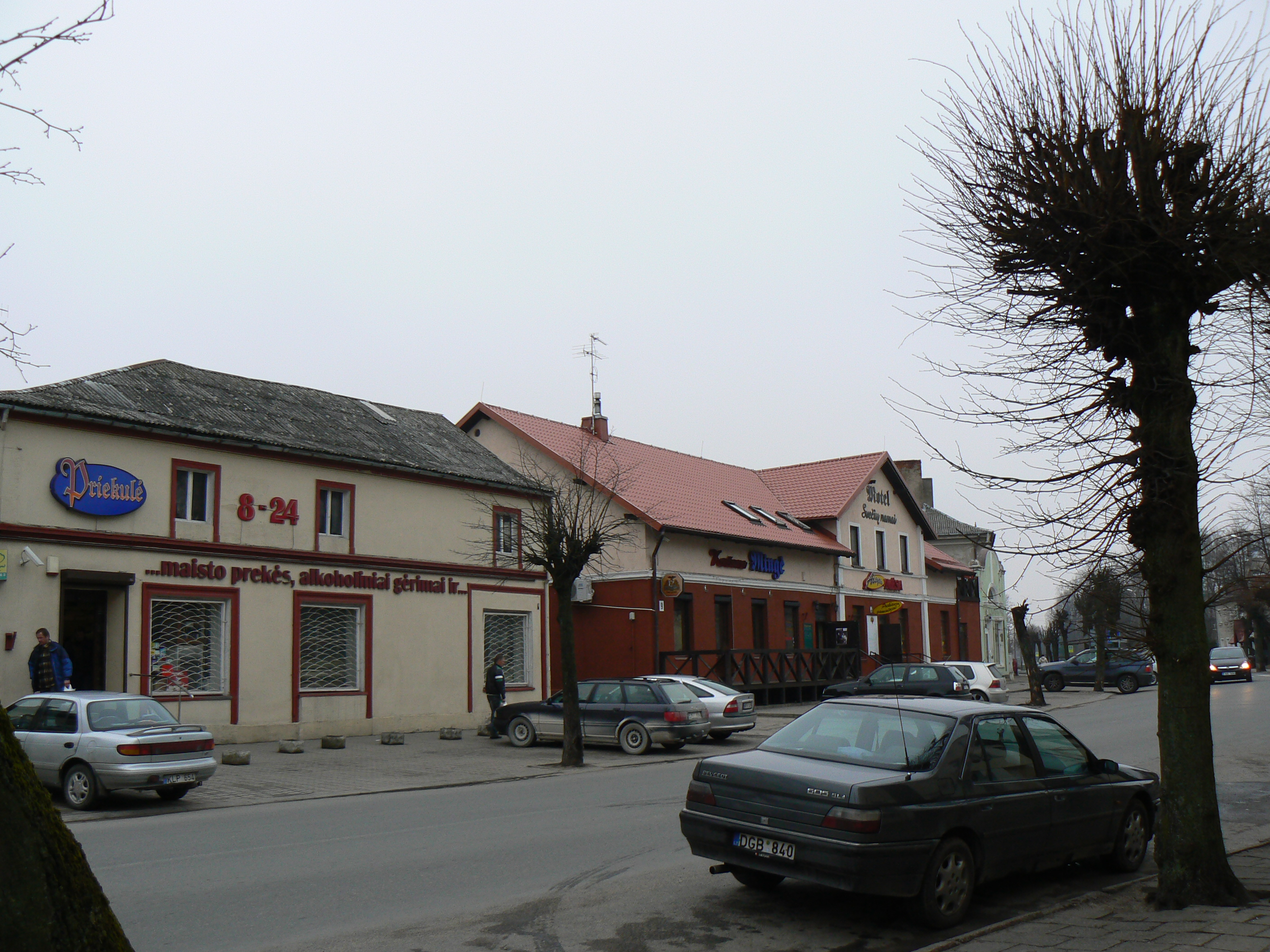
- Priekulė city center

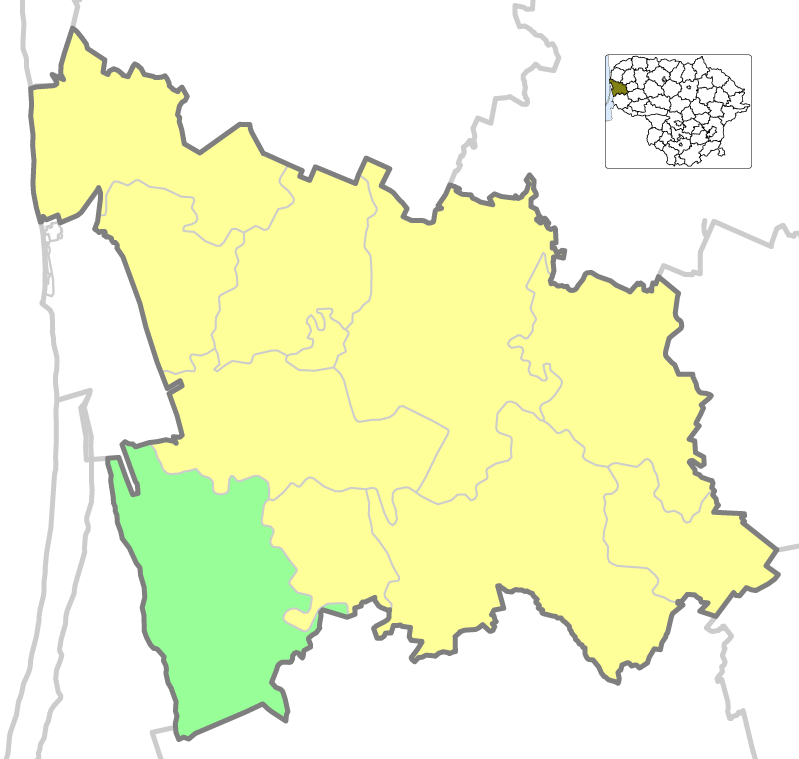
- Location of Priekulė Eldership
- Coordinates: 55.561°N 21.283°E
- Country: Lithuania
- Ethnographic region: Lithuania Minor
- County: Klaipėda County
- Municipality: Klaipėda District Municipality
- Administrative centre: Priekulė

Area
  - Total: 162 km^{2} (63 sq mi)

Population (2021)
  - Total: 8,473
  - Density: 52.3/km^{2} (135/sq mi)
- Time zone: UTC+2 (EET)
  - Summer (DST): UTC+3 (EEST)

Priekulė Eldership (Lithuanian: Priekulės seniūnija) is a Lithuanian eldership, located in the southern part of Klaipėda District Municipality.
