= Sendvaris Eldership =

Sendvaris Eldership Sendvario seniūnija
- Eldership
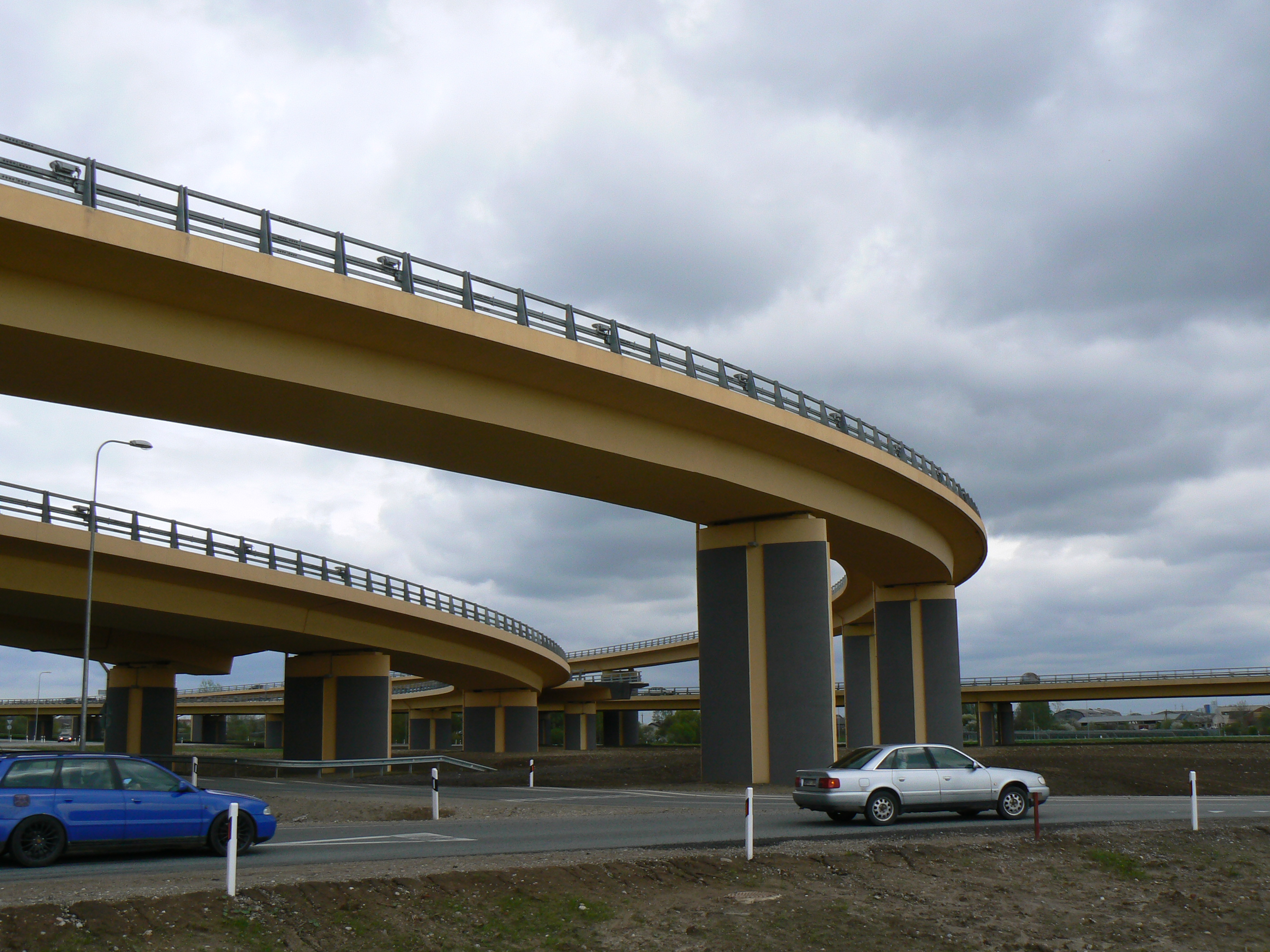
- Road near Jakai

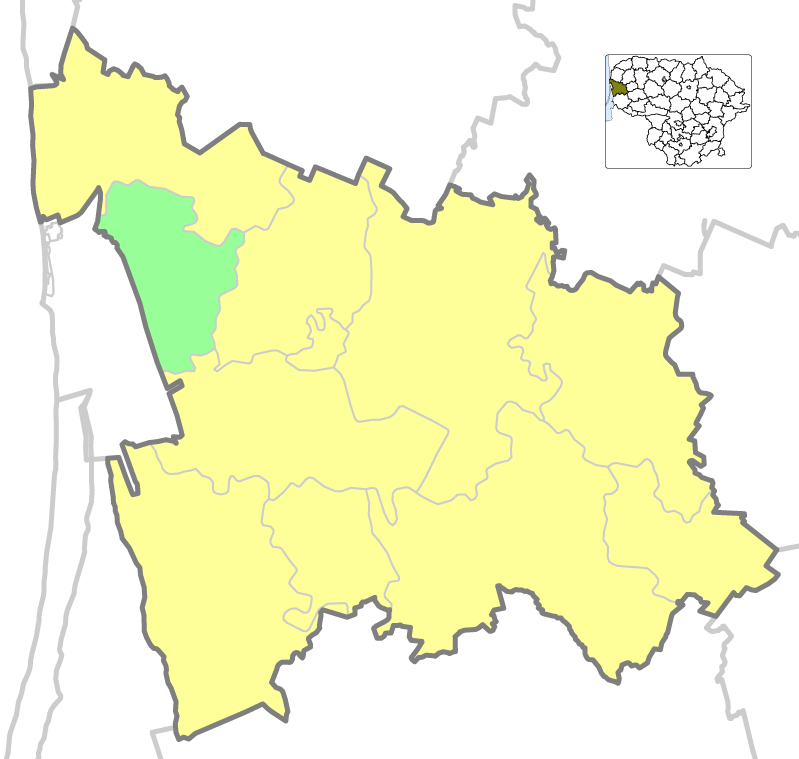
- Location of Sendvaris Eldership
- Country: Lithuania
- Ethnographic region: Lithuania Minor
- County: Klaipėda County
- Municipality: Klaipėda District Municipality
- Administrative centre: Slengiai

Area
  - Total: 72 km^{2} (28 sq mi)

Population (2021)
  - Total: 10,969
  - Density: 150/km^{2} (390/sq mi)
- Time zone: UTC+2 (EET)
  - Summer (DST): UTC+3 (EEST)

Sendvaris Eldership (Lithuanian: Sendvario seniūnija) is a Lithuanian eldership, located in the eastern part of Klaipėda District Municipality.
