= Dauparai-Kvietiniai Eldership =

Dauparai-Kvietiniai Eldership Dauparų-Kvietinių seniūnija
- Eldership
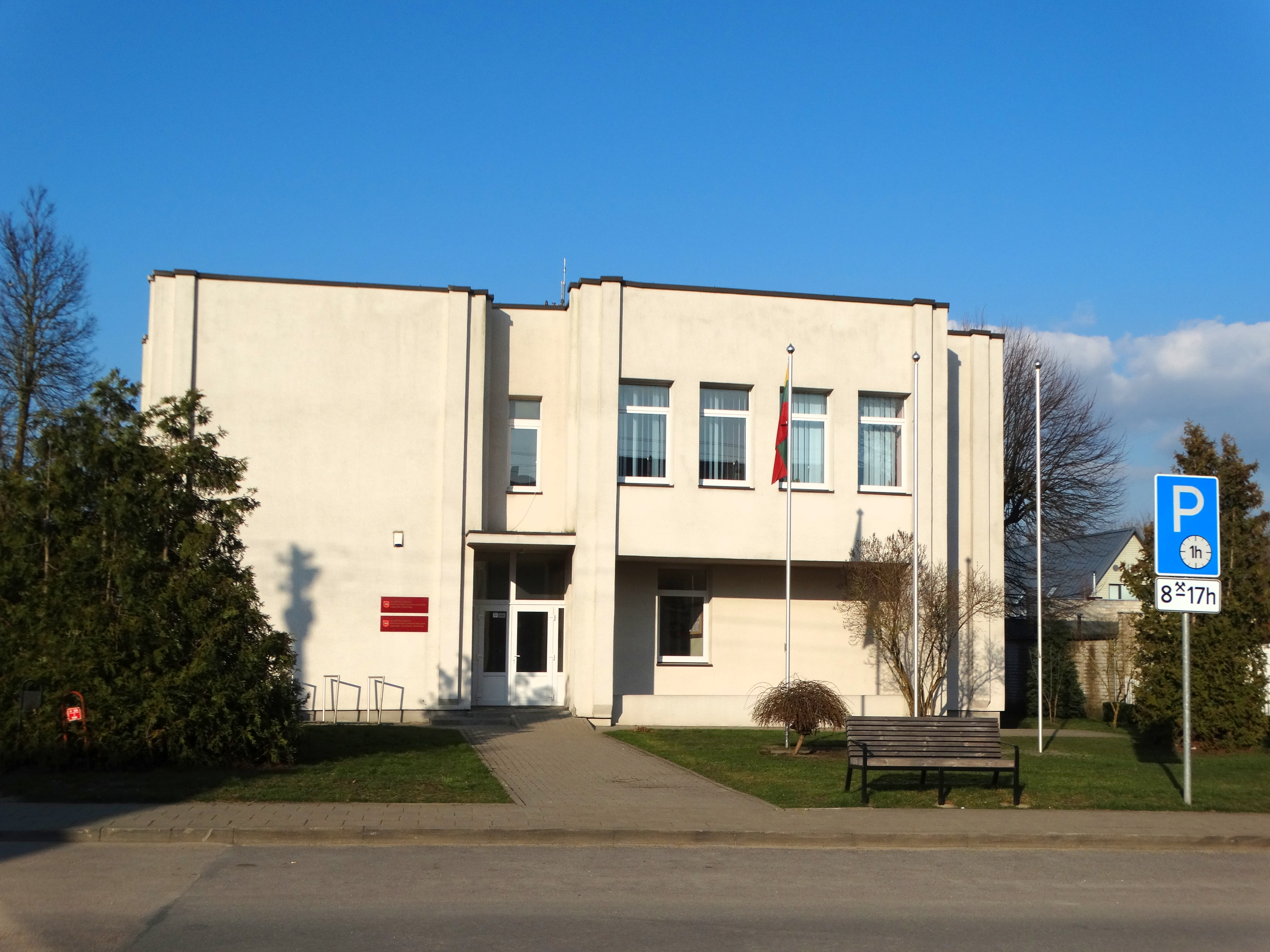
- Administration building

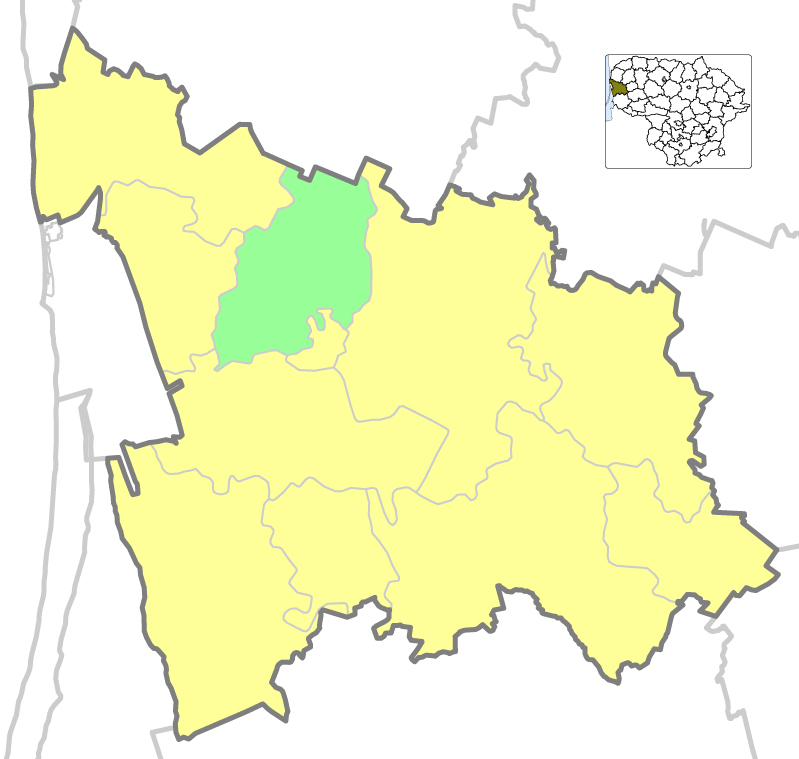
- Location of Dauparai-Kvietiniai Eldership
- Coordinates: 55.760°N 21.361°E
- Country: Lithuania
- Ethnographic region: Lithuania Minor
- County: Klaipėda County
- Municipality: Klaipėda District Municipality
- Administrative centre: Gargždai

Area
  - Total: 92 km^{2} (36 sq mi)

Population (2021)
  - Total: 2,797
  - Density: 30/km^{2} (79/sq mi)
- Time zone: UTC+2 (EET)
  - Summer (DST): UTC+3 (EEST)

Dauparai-Kvietiniai Eldership (Lithuanian: Dauparų-Kvietinių seniūnija) is a Lithuanian eldership, located in the northern part of Klaipėda District Municipality.
