= Žibininkai =

- Village
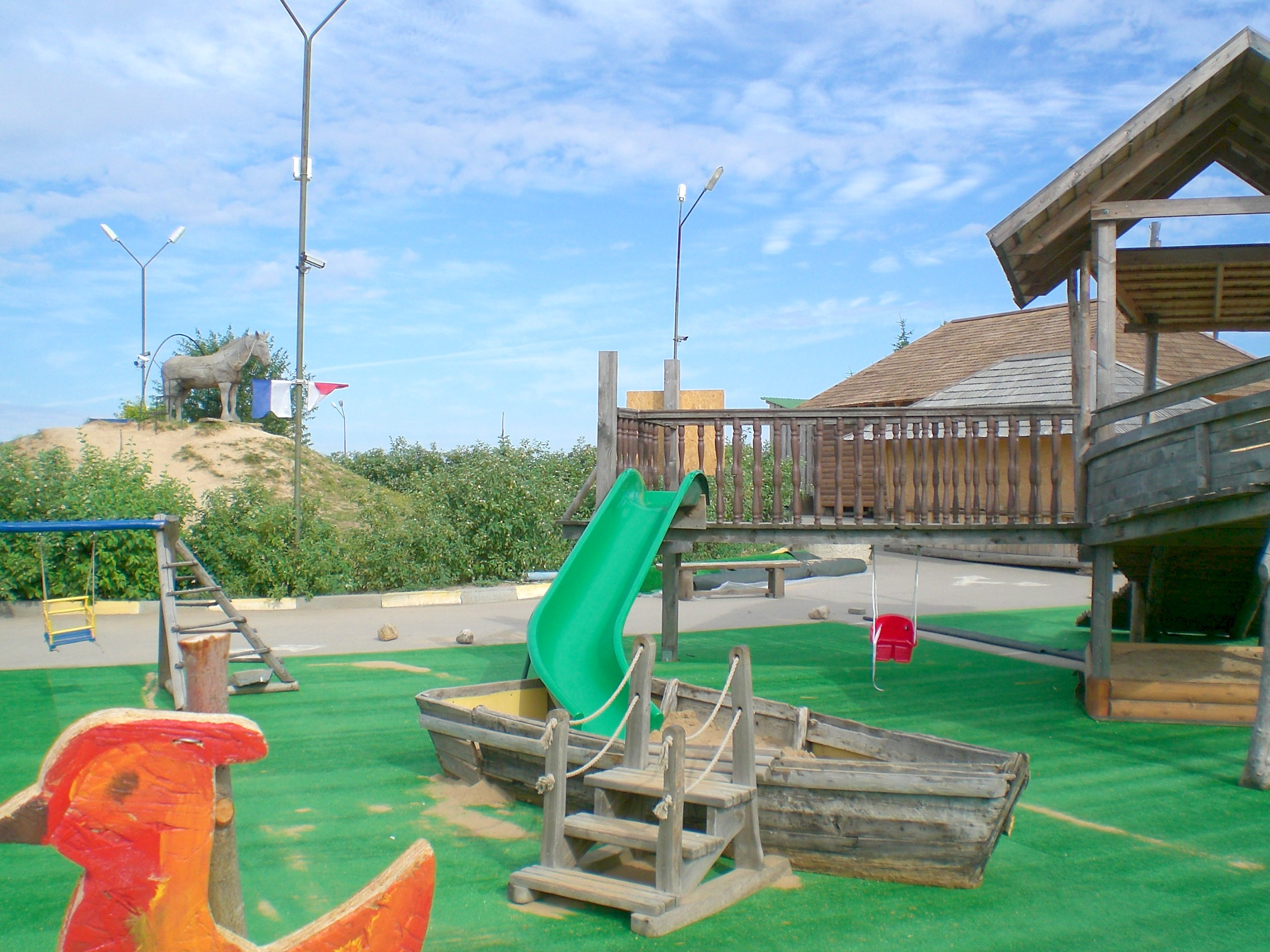

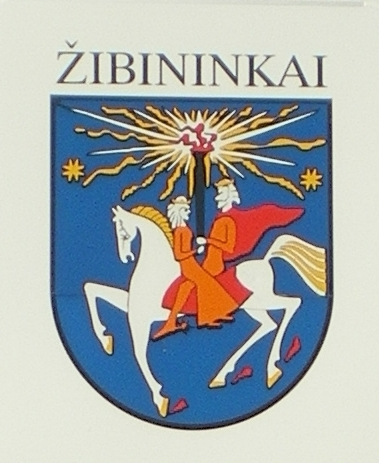
- Coat of arms

- Location of Žibininkai
- Coordinates: 55°58′N 21°09′E
- Country: Lithuania
- Ethnographic region: Samogitia
- County: Klaipėda County
- Municipality: Kretinga municipality
- Eldership: Kretinga elderate

Population (2011)
  - Total: 44
- Time zone: UTC+2 (EET)
  - Summer (DST): UTC+3 (EEST)

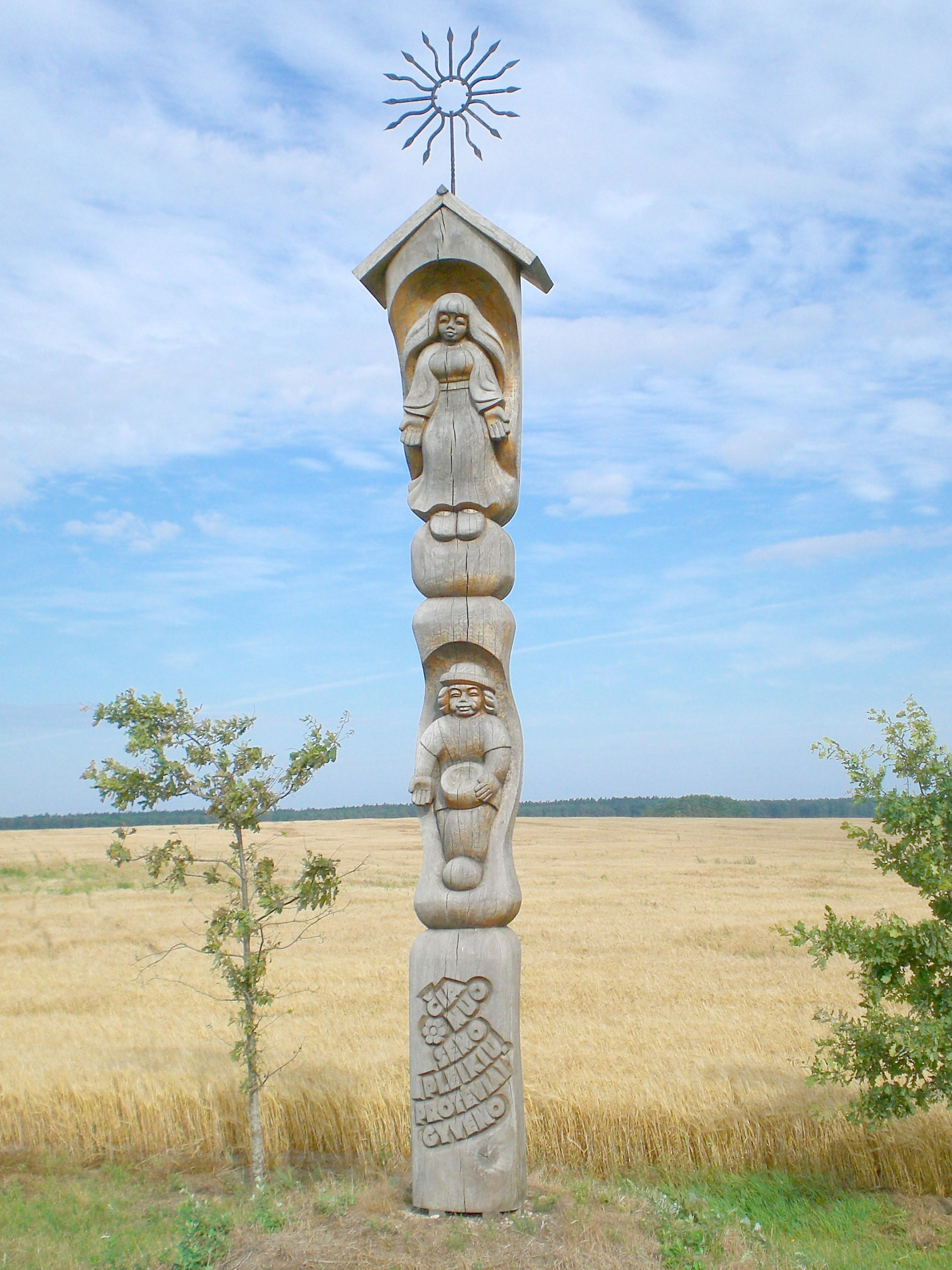
Wooden statue in Žibininkai

Žibininkai is a village in Lithuania. It is located in the Kretinga municipality, 4 km northeast of the Baltic Sea resort Palanga.

In the village there is a spacious complex of the brewery "HBH Juozo alus", where visitors can find beer gardens, restaurants, a horse riding centre and a vast playground. According to the 2011 census, the village had 44 residents.
