= Veiviržėnai Eldership =

Veiviržėnai Eldership Veiviržėnų seniūnija
- Eldership
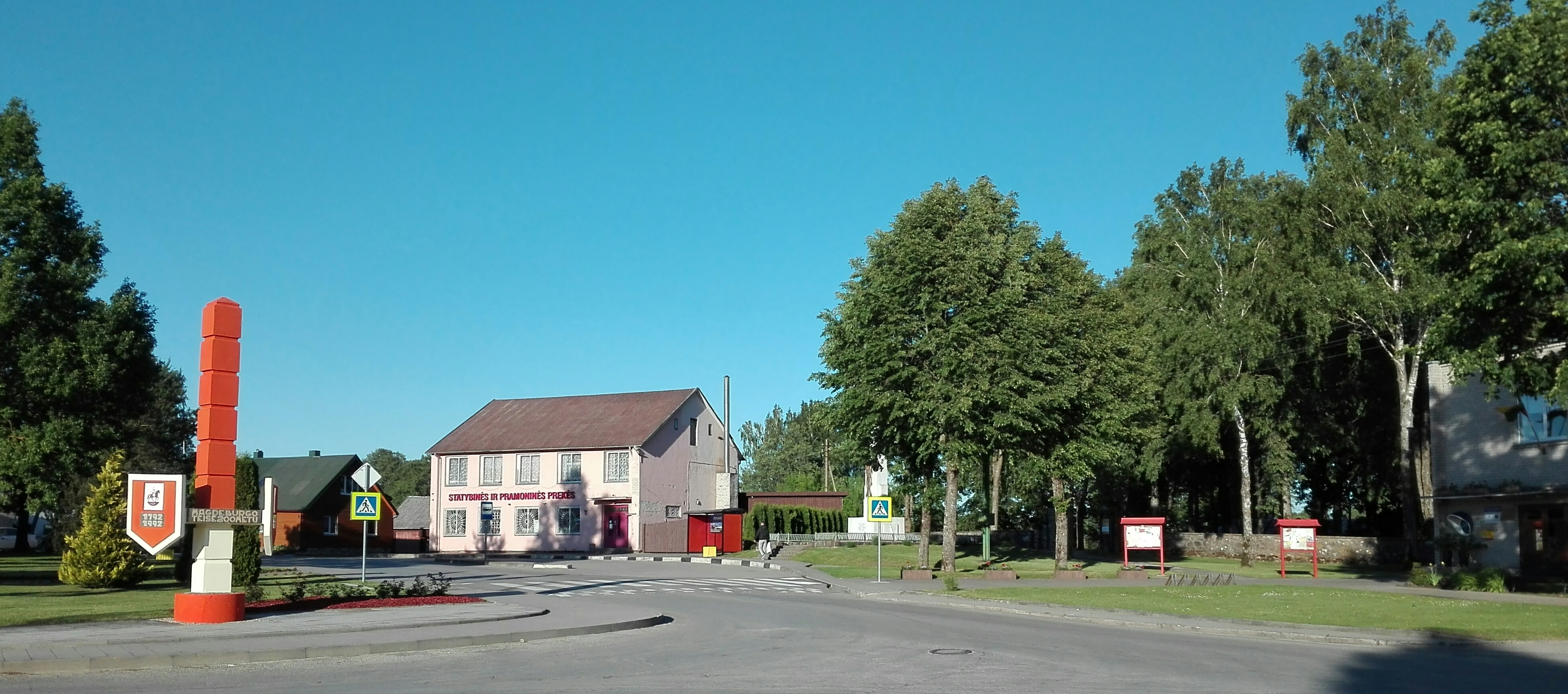
- Street in Veiviržėnai

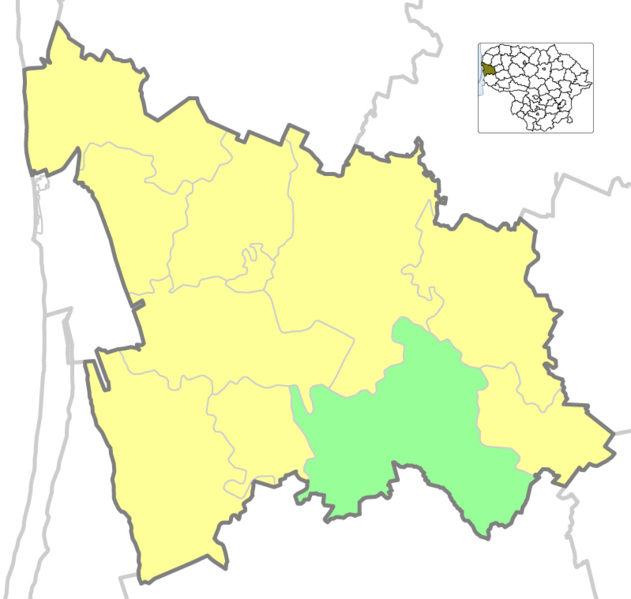
- Location of Veiviržėnai Eldership
- Coordinates: 55.600°N 21.608°E
- Country: Lithuania
- Ethnographic region: Samogitia
- County: Klaipėda County
- Municipality: Klaipėda District Municipality
- Administrative centre: Veiviržėnai

Area
  - Total: 188 km^{2} (73 sq mi)

Population (2021)
  - Total: 2,458
  - Density: 13.1/km^{2} (33.9/sq mi)
- Time zone: UTC+2 (EET)
  - Summer (DST): UTC+3 (EEST)

Veiviržėnai Eldership (Lithuanian: Veiviržėnų seniūnija) is a Lithuanian eldership, located in the southern part of Klaipėda District Municipality.
