= Agluonėnai Eldership =

Agluonėnai Eldership Agluonėnų seniūnija
- Eldership
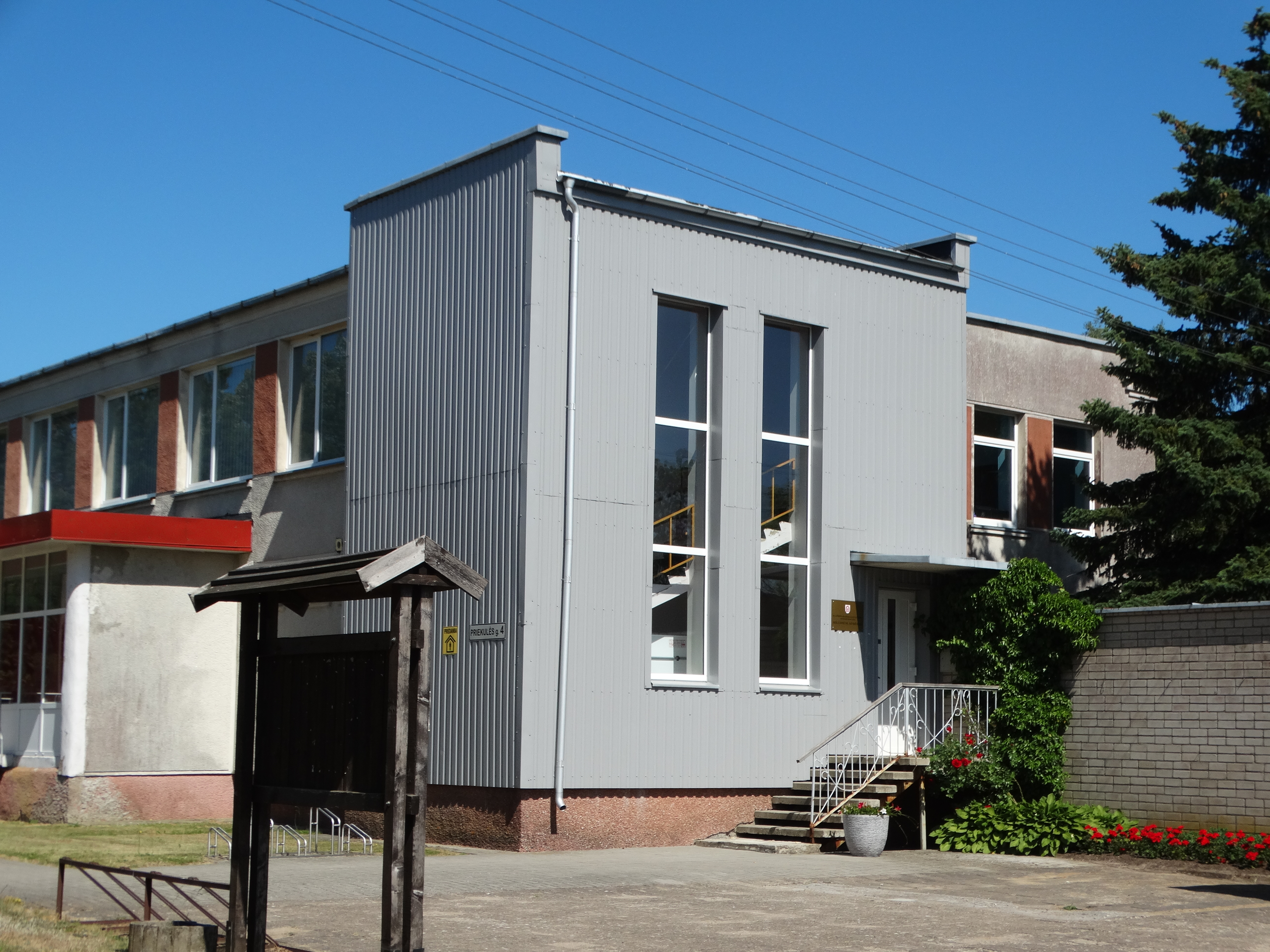
- Administration building

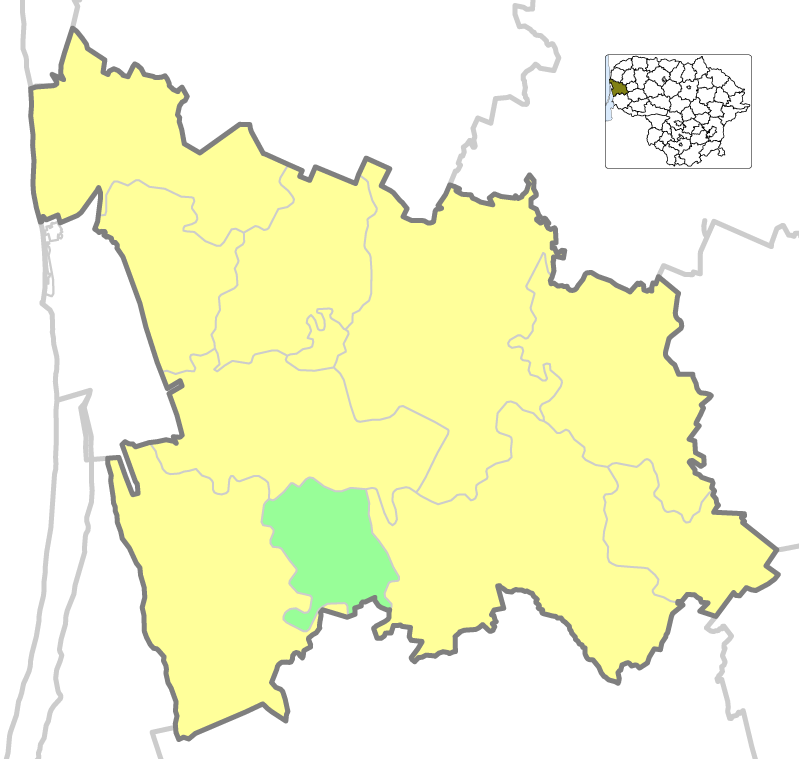
- Location of Agluonėnai Eldership
- Coordinates: 55.584°N 21.404°E
- Country: Lithuania
- Ethnographic region: Lithuania Minor
- County: Klaipėda County
- Municipality: Klaipėda District Municipality
- Administrative centre: Agluonėnai

Area
  - Total: 57 km^{2} (22 sq mi)

Population (2021)
  - Total: 1,001
  - Density: 18/km^{2} (45/sq mi)
- Time zone: UTC+2 (EET)
  - Summer (DST): UTC+3 (EEST)

Agluonėnai Eldership (Lithuanian: Agluonėnų seniūnija) is a Lithuanian eldership, located in the southern part of Klaipėda District Municipality.
