= Kūlupis =

Kūlupis (literally "stony rivulet") is the name of several rivers in Lithuania:

- Kūlupis (Blendžiava), tributary of Blendžiava
- Kūlupis (Minija), tributary of Minija
- Kūlupis (Salantas), tributary of Salantas
