= National Golf Resort Golf Club =

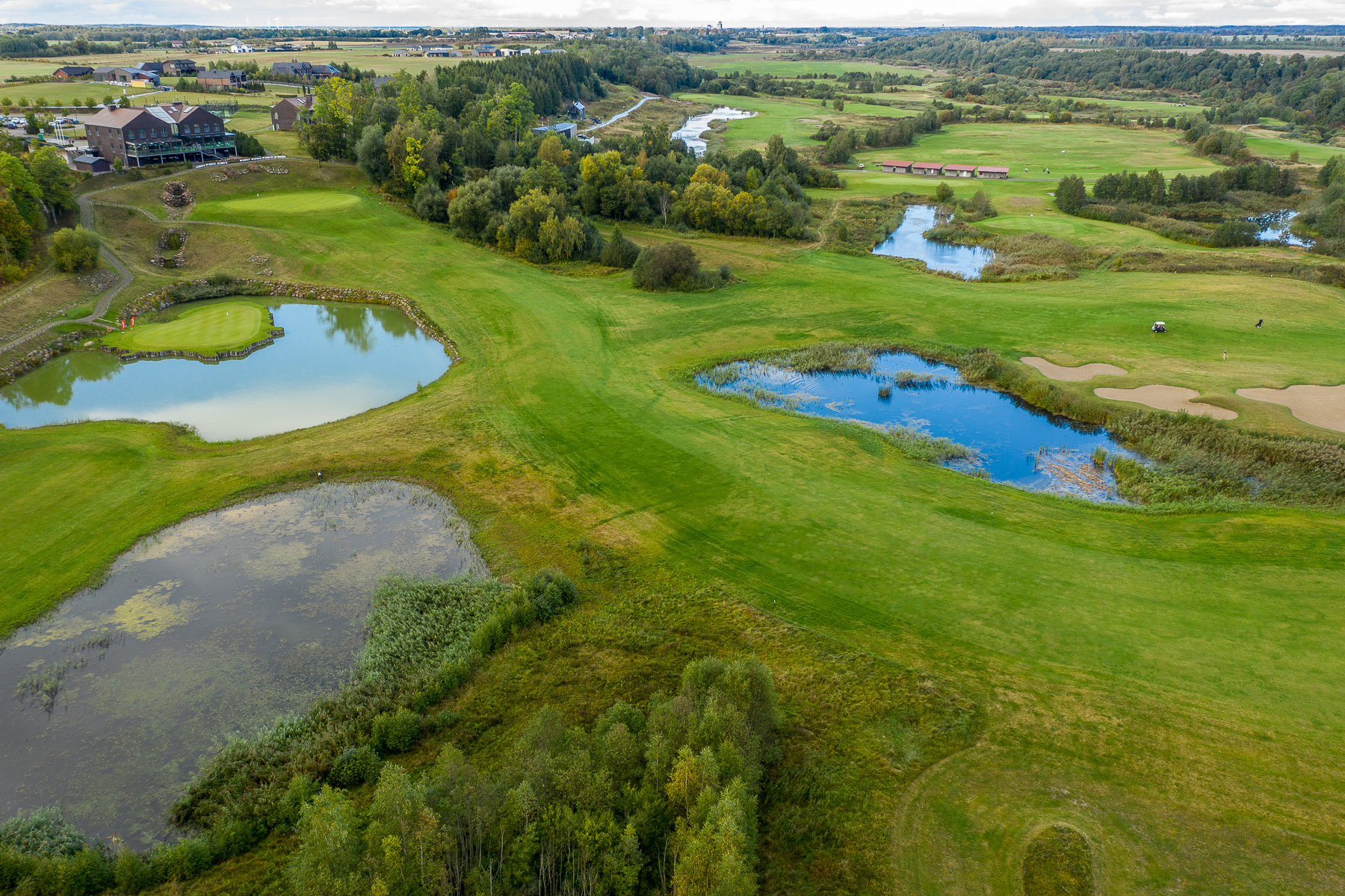
- Interactive map of National Golf Resort Golf Club
- 55°48′43″N 21°10′53″E

Club information
- Location: Stančiai, Lithuania
- Established: 2006
- Tota holes: 18
- Tournaments: 2015 European Amateur Team Championships
- Website: nationalgolf.lt

National Golf Resort Golf Club is a golf club and course on the bank of the Danė river in Stančiai, Klaipėda District Municipality.

In 2015 Golf Club hosted one of the European Amateur Team Championship competitions.
