= Vėžaičiai =

- Town
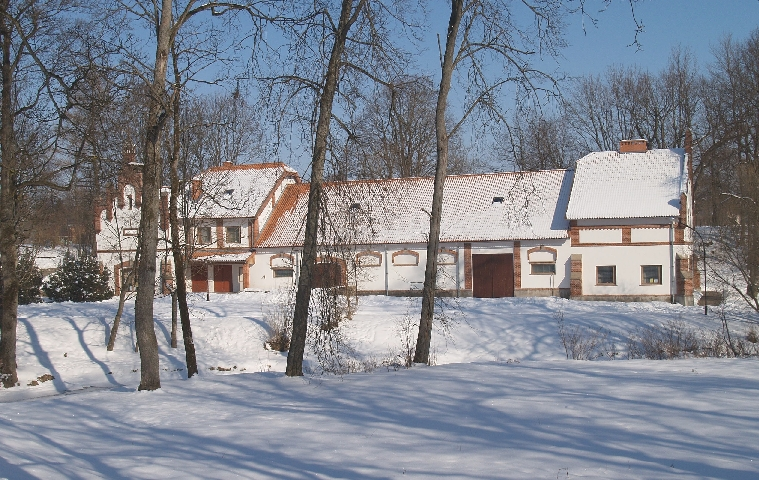
- House of Culture

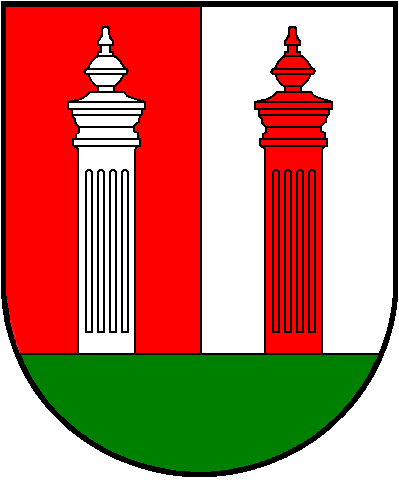
- Seal

- Location within Lithuania
- Coordinates: 55°43′0″N 21°28′30″E
- Country: Lithuania
- County: Klaipėda County

Population (2011)
  - Total: 1,877
- Time zone: UTC+2 (EET)
  - Summer (DST): UTC+3 (EEST)

Vėžaičiai is a small town in Klaipėda County, in western Lithuania. According to the 2011 census, the town has a population of 1,877 people.
