= Dovilai =

- Town
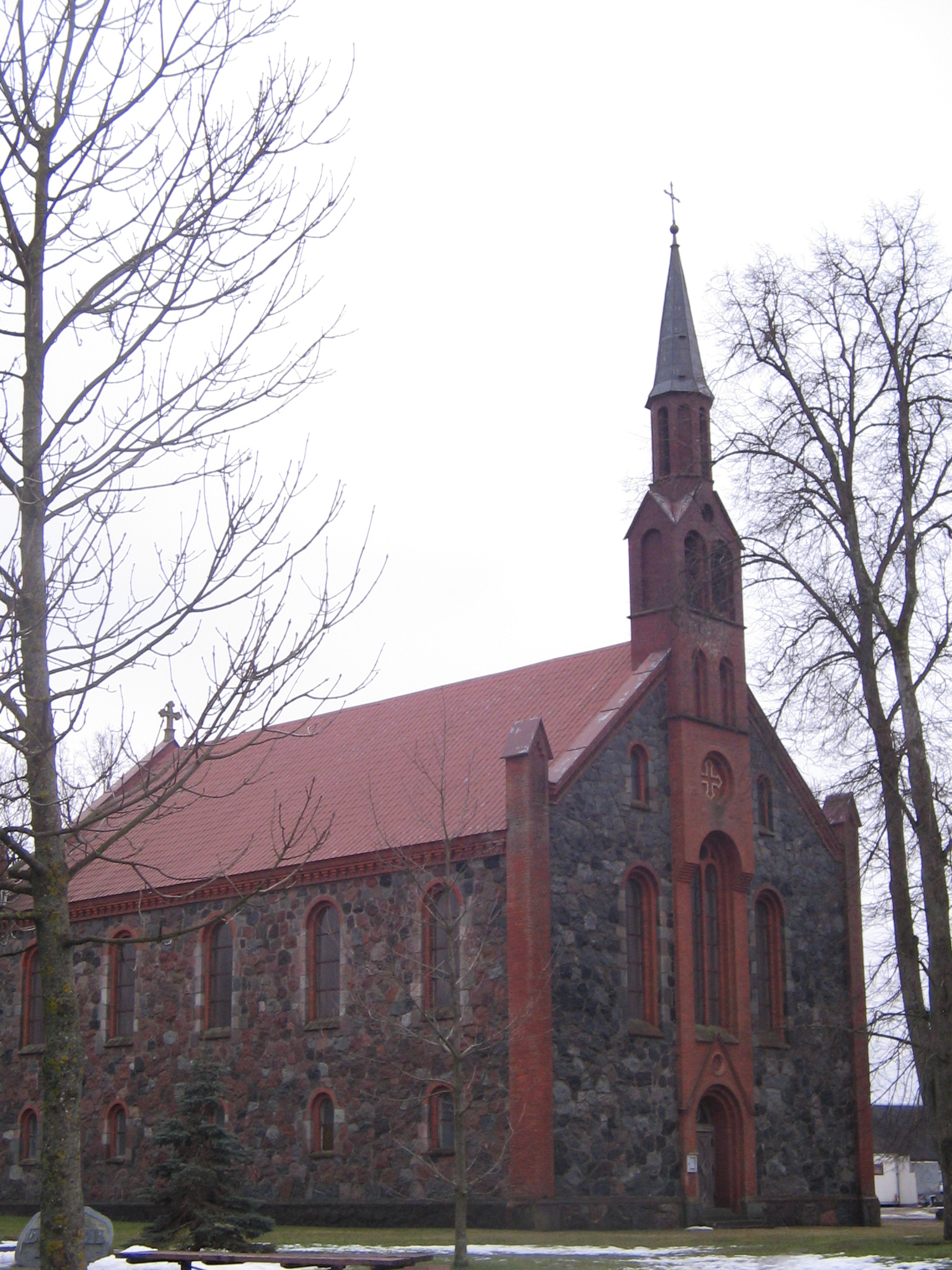

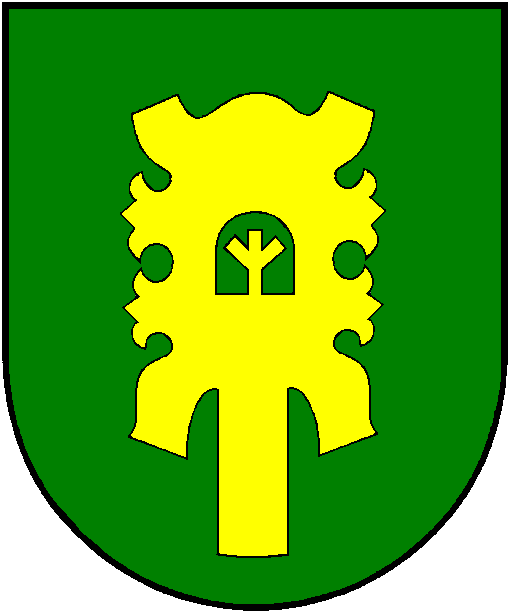
- Seal

- Location within Lithuania
- Coordinates: 55°40′40″N 21°21′20″E
- Country: Lithuania
- County: Klaipėda County

Population (2011)
  - Total: 1,246
- Time zone: UTC+2 (EET)
  - Summer (DST): UTC+3 (EEST)

Dovilai (German: Dawillen) is a small town in Klaipėda County, in northwestern Lithuania. According to the 2011 census, the town has a population of 1,246 people.

Dovilai town has a middle school, kindergarten, culture house, library, church, post office and a Rural tourism homestead. In 1736 a first primary school in Dovilai was opened, which became an eight-year school in 1971 and a middle school in 1986. In 2009 coat of arms of the town was approved.
