= Endriejavas =

- Town
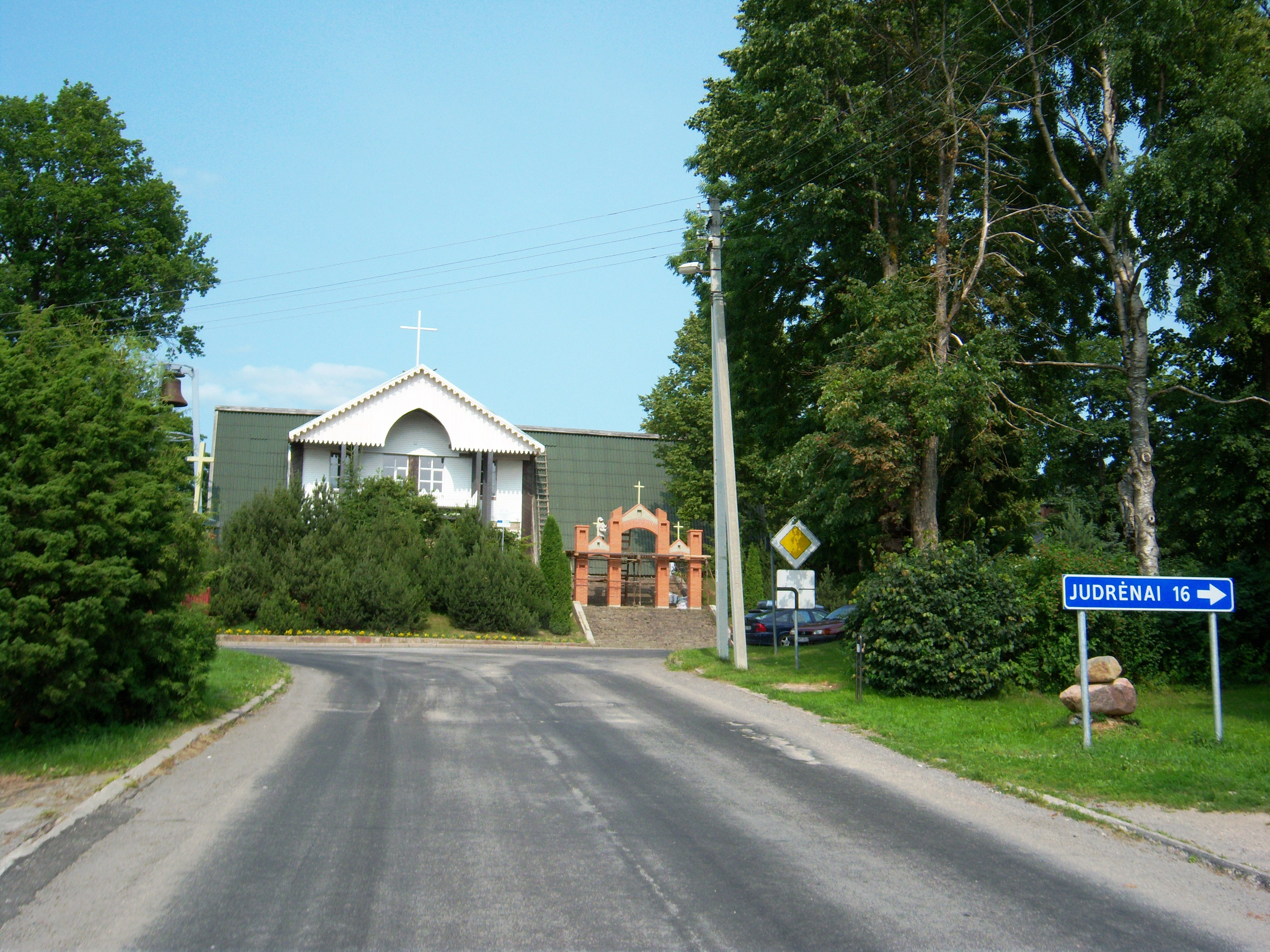
- Endriejavas centre

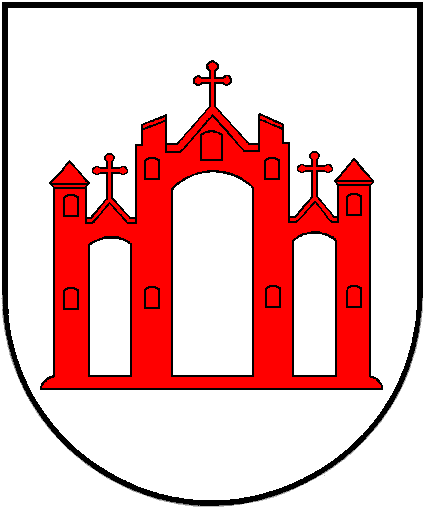
- Seal

- Location within Lithuania
- Coordinates: 55°41′50″N 21°43′20″E
- Country: Lithuania
- County: Klaipėda County

Population (2011)
  - Total: 640
- Time zone: UTC+2 (EET)
  - Summer (DST): UTC+3 (EEST)

Endriejavas (Polish: Andrzejewo) is a small town in Klaipėda County, in northwestern Lithuania. According to the 2011 census, the town has a population of 640 people.

Historically it was a private town of the Racewicz Polish landed gentry family. In 1780, Andrzej Racewicz built a wooden Catholic church dedicated to St. Andrew.
