= Judrėnai =

- Town
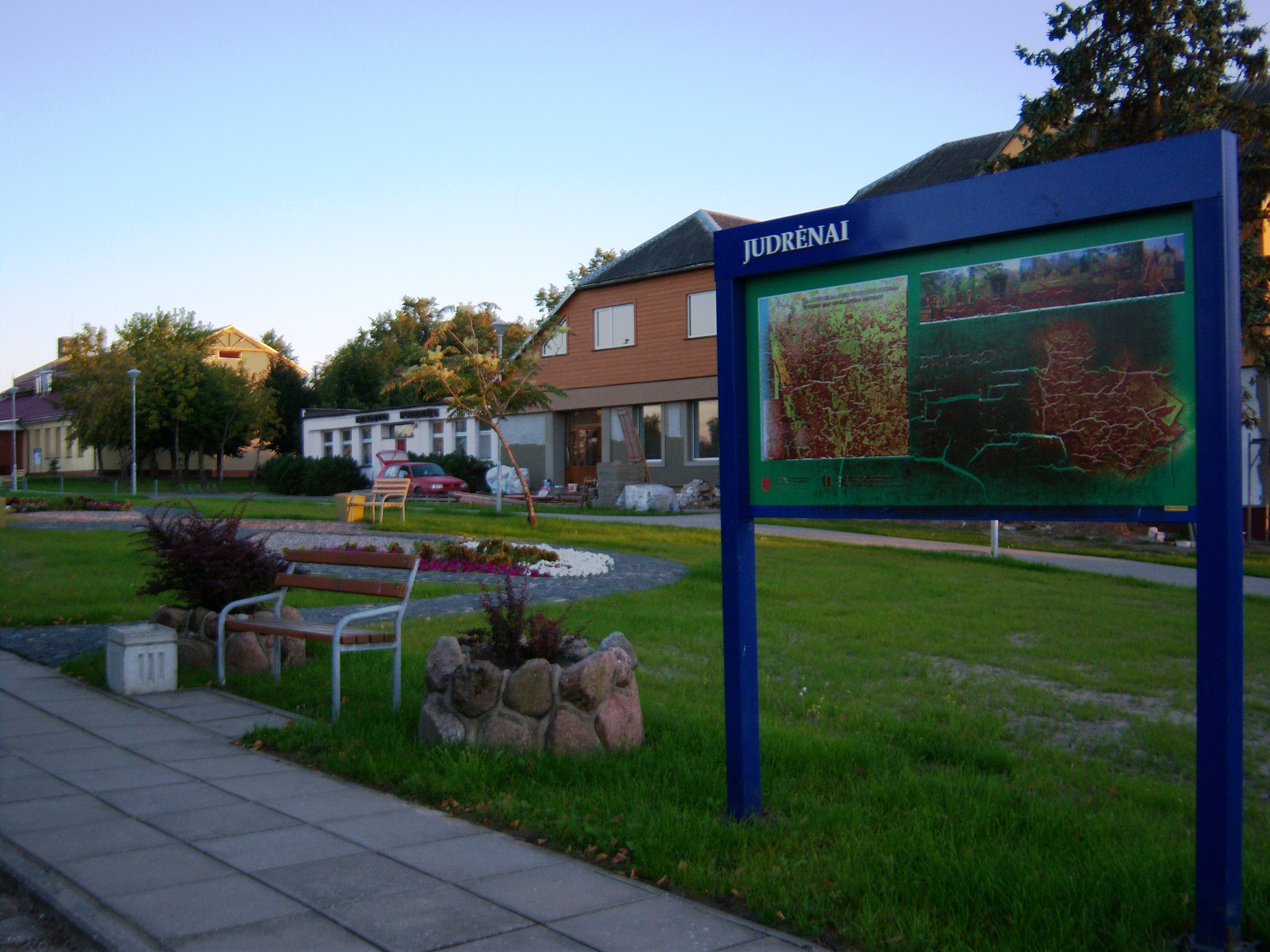
- Town centre

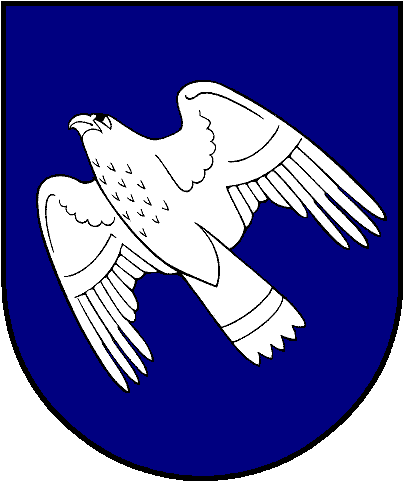
- Seal

- Location within Lithuania
- Coordinates: 55°35′10″N 21°48′10″E
- Country: Lithuania
- County: Klaipėda County

Population (2011)
  - Total: 468
- Time zone: UTC+2 (EET)
  - Summer (DST): UTC+3 (EEST)

Judrėnai is a small town in Klaipėda County, in northwestern Lithuania. According to the 2011 census, the town has a population of 468 people.
