= Egon Erzum =

German politician

- Born: 22 September 1904; Prökuls, East Prussia, Germany
- Died: 14 October 1974 (aged 70); Leutershausen, Middle Franconia, Germany
- Occupation: Politician
- Political party: Christian Social Union of Bavaria; All-German Bloc/League of Expellees and Deprived of Rights

Egon Erzum (22 September 1904 – 14 October 1974) was a German politician from the GB/BHE and later of the Christian Social Union of Bavaria.

He was one of the co-founders of the GB/BHE and member of the Landtag of Bavaria between 1954 and 1958. Following the demise of the party he affiliated to the Christian Social Union of Bavaria. He was also Mayor of Leutershausen from 1962 to 1965.
