= Priekulė, Lithuania =

Priekulė
- Town
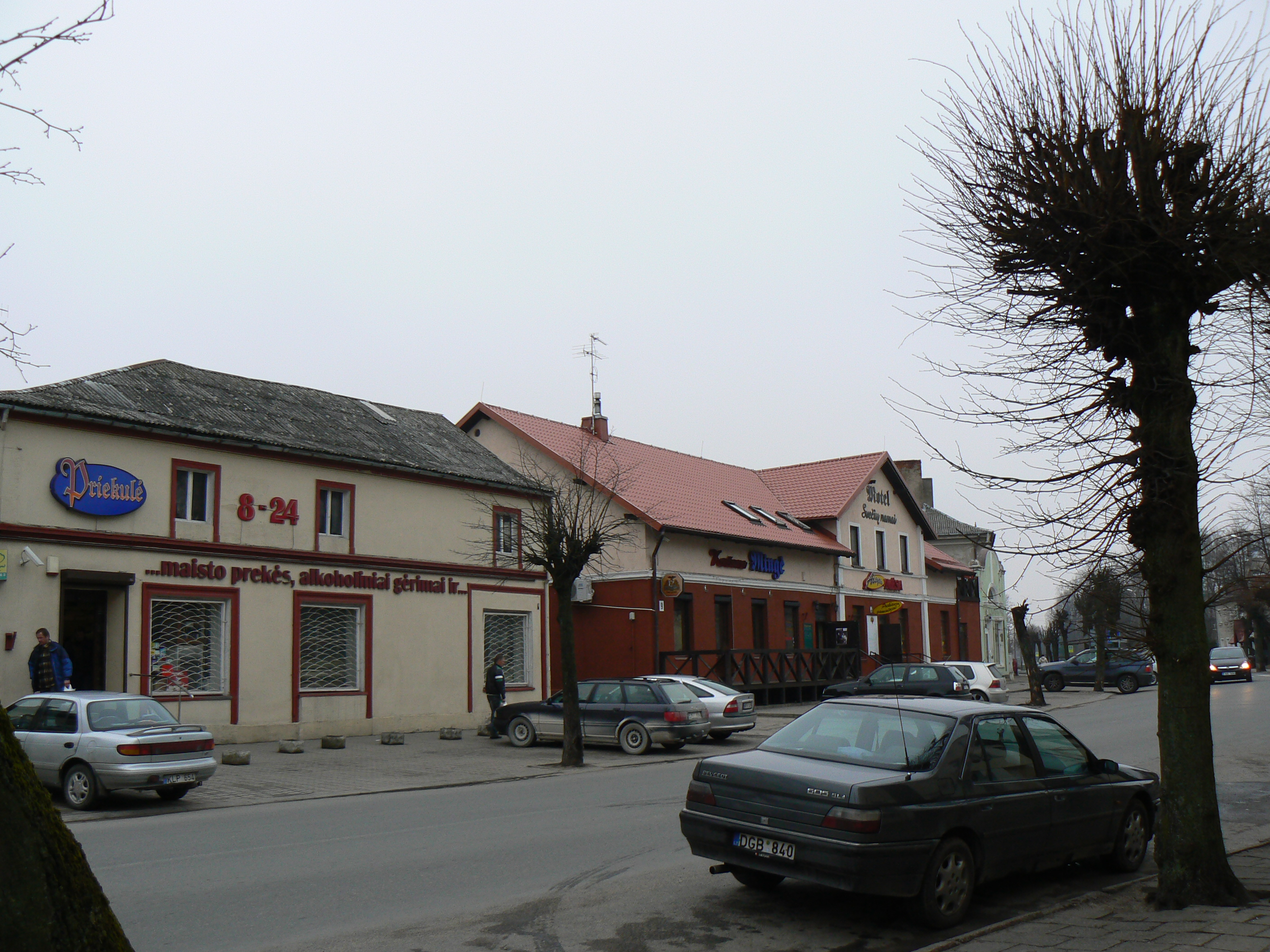
- Main street toward Klaipėda

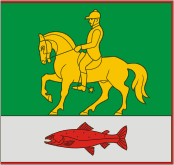
- Flag Coat of arms
- Interactive map of Priekulė
- Location of Priekulė
- Coordinates: 55°33′20″N 21°19′10″E
- Country: Lithuania
- Ethnographic region: Lithuania Minor
- County: Klaipėda County
- Municipality: Klaipėda District Municipality
- Eldership: Priekulė eldership
- Capital of: Priekulė eldership
- First mentioned: 16th century
- Granted town rights: 1948

Population (2022)
  - Total: 1,219
- Time zone: UTC+2 (EET)
  - Summer (DST): UTC+3 (EEST)

Priekulė (German: Prökuls) is a small town in Klaipėda District Municipality, in western Lithuania. It is located on the banks of Minija River about 20 kilometres (12 mi) south of Klaipėda. Priekulė is the seat of Priekulė elderate. It is located in the historic region of Lithuania Minor.

== History ==
Priekulė's name is known since the first half of the 16th century. At first it was named Paminia (at river Minija), and it was a small village with three homesteads. In 1511, a tavern "zur Minnige" is mentioned in written sources. In 1540, a certain Lukas Preckol is an owner of the tavern. It is believed that the town name was derived from Preckol's last name. The name "Precols" was recorded on region maps in 1548. A church was built in 1587 and a teacher was hired in 1594.

It was a part of the Polish–Lithuanian Commonwealth, as a fief of Poland, held by the Teutonic Knights and secular Ducal Prussia. In 1609 during the Polish–Swedish War (1600–1611), regiments of the Polish–Lithuanian cavalry plundered the town. In 1688 minister Wilhelm Martin built a new church. In 1773, it became part of the newly formed province of East Prussia within the Kingdom of Prussia, and from 1871 it was also part of Germany. In 1905 the village, now known as Prökuls, had 500 residents who were mostly Protestant Lutherans and mainly spoke the Memelland-Samogitian dialect.

In the course of the German revolutions on March 29, 1848, the local judiciary was demolished, the tax collector was mistreated and the pub was looted. The Prussian authorities put down the uprising on March 30

Following the restoration of independent Lithuania in 1918, the town was acquired by Lithuania in 1923. Under German occupation during World War II, it was the location of the Oflag 63 prisoner-of-war camp for Allied officers.

On December 19, 2002, the city was granted coat of arms by the President of Lithuania.

== Landmarks ==
There is St. Anthony of Padua Church, built in 1938. In the city park grows a centuries-old oak, that is preserved as monument of nature. In the city there is a monument to Lithuanian writer Ieva Simonaitytė. Her cottage is turned into memorial museum (established in 1984). Estates of the forefathers of philosopher Immanuel Kant (1724–1804) were located in Kantvainai (Kantweinen) in the vicinity of Priekulė.

== Notable residents ==
- Egon Erzum (1904–1974), German politician
- Erich Hippke (1888–1969), German physician and Generaloberstabsarzt in the Luftwaffe

== Literature ==
- Mortensen, Hans und Gertrud: Kants väterliche Ahnen und ihre Umwelt, Rede von 1952 in Jahrbuch der Albertus-Universität zu Königsberg / Pr., Holzner- Verlag Kitzingen/ Main 1953 Bd. 3
- Sembritzki, Johannes: Geschichte des Kreises Memel, Memel 1918
