= Klaipėda District Municipality =

Klaipėda District Municipality Klaipėdos rajono savivaldybė
- Municipality
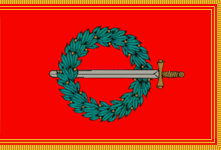
- Flag Coat of arms Brandmark

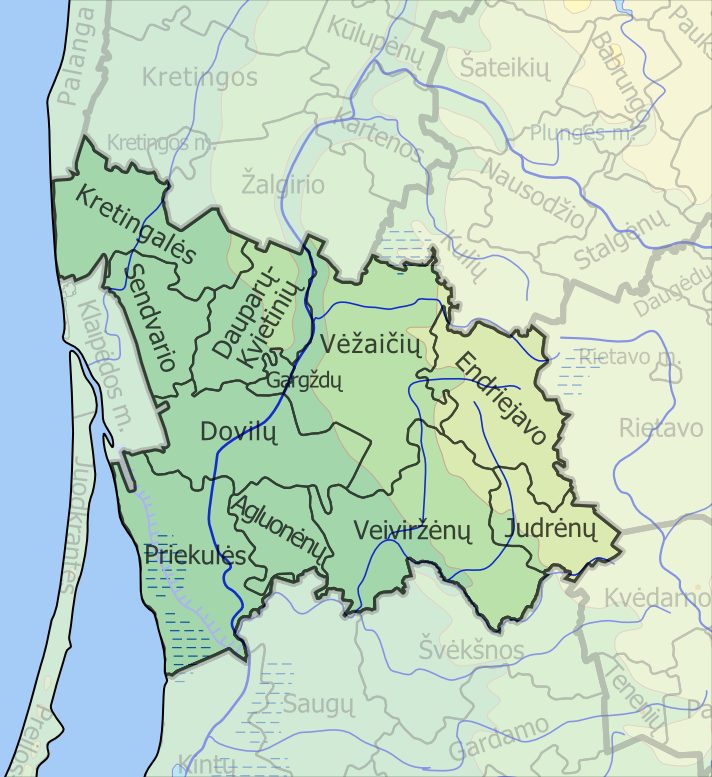
- Map of Klaipėda district municipality
- Interactive map of Klaipėda District Municipality
- Country: Lithuania
- Ethnographic region: Lithuania Minor / Samogitia
- County: Klaipėda County
- Capital: Gargždai
- Elderships: 11

Area
  - Total: 1,336 km^{2} (516 sq mi)
  - Rank: 23rd

Population (July 2026)
  - Total: 72,796
  - Rank: 8st
  - Density: 54.49/km^{2} (141.1/sq mi)
  - Rank: 28th
- Time zone: UTC+2 (EET)
  - Summer (DST): UTC+3 (EEST)
- Telephone code: 46
- Major settlements: Gargždai (pop. 15,072); Priekulė (pop. 1,219)
- Website: www.klaipedos-r.lt

Klaipėda District Municipality (Lithuanian: Klaipėdos rajono savivaldybė) is a municipality in western Lithuania, east of the city of Klaipėda, by the Curonian Lagoon and the Baltic Sea. Its administrative centre is the town of Gargždai (unlike other Lithuanian municipalities, the name of this municipality does not correspond to its administrative centre). It covers an area of 1336 km^{2} (2% of the total area of Lithuania). The municipality owns most of the Seaside Regional Park. It is home to the famous The Dutchman's Cap Hill, the highest cliff on the Lithuanian coast.

== History ==
Klaipėda District was formed by the occupying Soviet authorities on 20 June 1950 from the former pre-war Klaipėda County (reestablished in 1995) and part of Plungė County. Its administrative seat was the city of Klaipėda and from 25 May 1952 – the town of Gargždai.

In 1958 the town of Gargždai was redesignated into an urban-type settlement and in 1965 – into a town under the direct jurisdiction of the district government.

In 1959 the 8 sub-districts of the abolished Priekulė District and the town of Priekulė were incorporated into Klaipėda District and since 1962 the boundaries of the Klaipėda District have changed frequently.

Modern Klaipėda District Municipality was established in 1995. On 26 June 2009, by decision of the Municipal Council, 75 elderships were established.

== Industry ==
The most important natural resource is oil; the largest deposits are found near Diegliai, South Šiūpariai, Vėžaičiai and Vilkyčiai. The most important industries are oil extraction (Lotos Geonafta, Minijos nafta, Manifodas), building materials (Gargždai brick factory), furniture and other wood products manufacturing and peat mining industry in the Dauparai peat bog. Industrial enterprises are mainly concentrated in Gargždai.

== Elderships ==
Klaipėda District Municipality is divided into 11 elderships:

Eldership	Area	Population (2021)	Density per km^{2}
Agluonėnai	56.56 km^{2} (13,976.28 acres; 21.84 sq mi)	1,001	18
Dauparai-Kvietiniai	92 km^{2} (22,733.70 acres; 35.52 sq mi)	2,797	30
Dovilai	121.7 km^{2} (30,072.72 acres; 46.99 sq mi)	5,250	43
Endriejavas	145 km^{2} (35,830.28 acres; 55.98 sq mi)	1,372	9
Gargždai	11.02 km^{2} (2,723.10 acres; 4.25 sq mi)	15,065	1,370
Judrėnai	64 km^{2} (15,814.74 acres; 24.71 sq mi)	588	9
Kretingalė	110 km^{2} (27,181.59 acres; 42.47 sq mi)	5,005	46
Priekulė	161.77 km^{2} (39,974.24 acres; 62.46 sq mi)	8,473	52
Sendvaris	71.93 km^{2} (17,774.29 acres; 27.77 sq mi)	10,969	152
Veiviržėnai	188 km^{2} (46,455.81 acres; 72.59 sq mi)	2,458	13
Vėžaičiai	160.5 km^{2} (39,660.41 acres; 61.97 sq mi)	3,986	25
