= Minija =

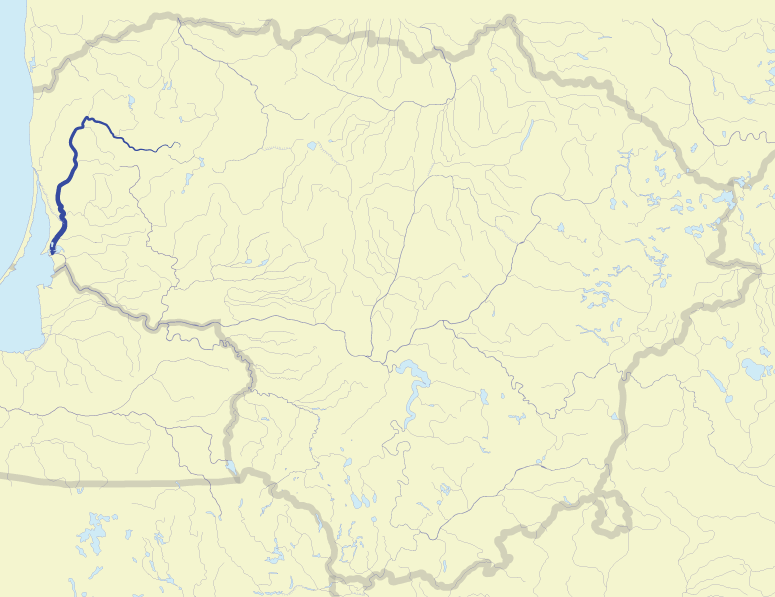
- Map highlighting Minija

Location
- Country: Lithuania

Physical characteristics
- Source
  - location: Lake Didovas
- Mouth
  - location: Neman
  - coordinates: 55.3469°N 21.2925°E
- Length: 202 km (126 mi)
- Basin size: 2,978 km^{2} (1,150 sq mi)
- Discharge
  - average: 38.7 m^{3}/s (1,370 cu ft/s)

Basin features
- Progression: Neman→ Baltic Sea

The Minija is a river in western Lithuania and a right tributary to the Nemunas. It is 202 km (126 mi) long. It begins from small Lake Didovas, and hydrographically from lake Sydeklis, 14 km south of Telšiai. The rivulet that flows out of Sydeklis here is called Mava, in between Lake Ilgis and Lake Pluotinalis - Kliurkė and only after Lake Didovo it gets the Minija name.

It flows through Lakes Ilgis, Pluotinalis, Didovas, and Gargždai, Priekulė towns before reaching the Atmata distributary of the Nemunas delta.

In 1873 a channel, called "Vilhelmo kanalas" was built that connected Minija directly with Klaipėda port.

== Tributary rivers ==
- Left: Pala, Alantas, Žvelsa, Agluona, Veiviržas, Tenenys
- Right: Sausdaravas, Babrungas, Mišupė, Salnatas
