= Klaipėda County =

County of Lithuania

Coordinates: 55°41′54″N 21°08′49″E

Klaipėda County Klaipėdos apskritis
- County
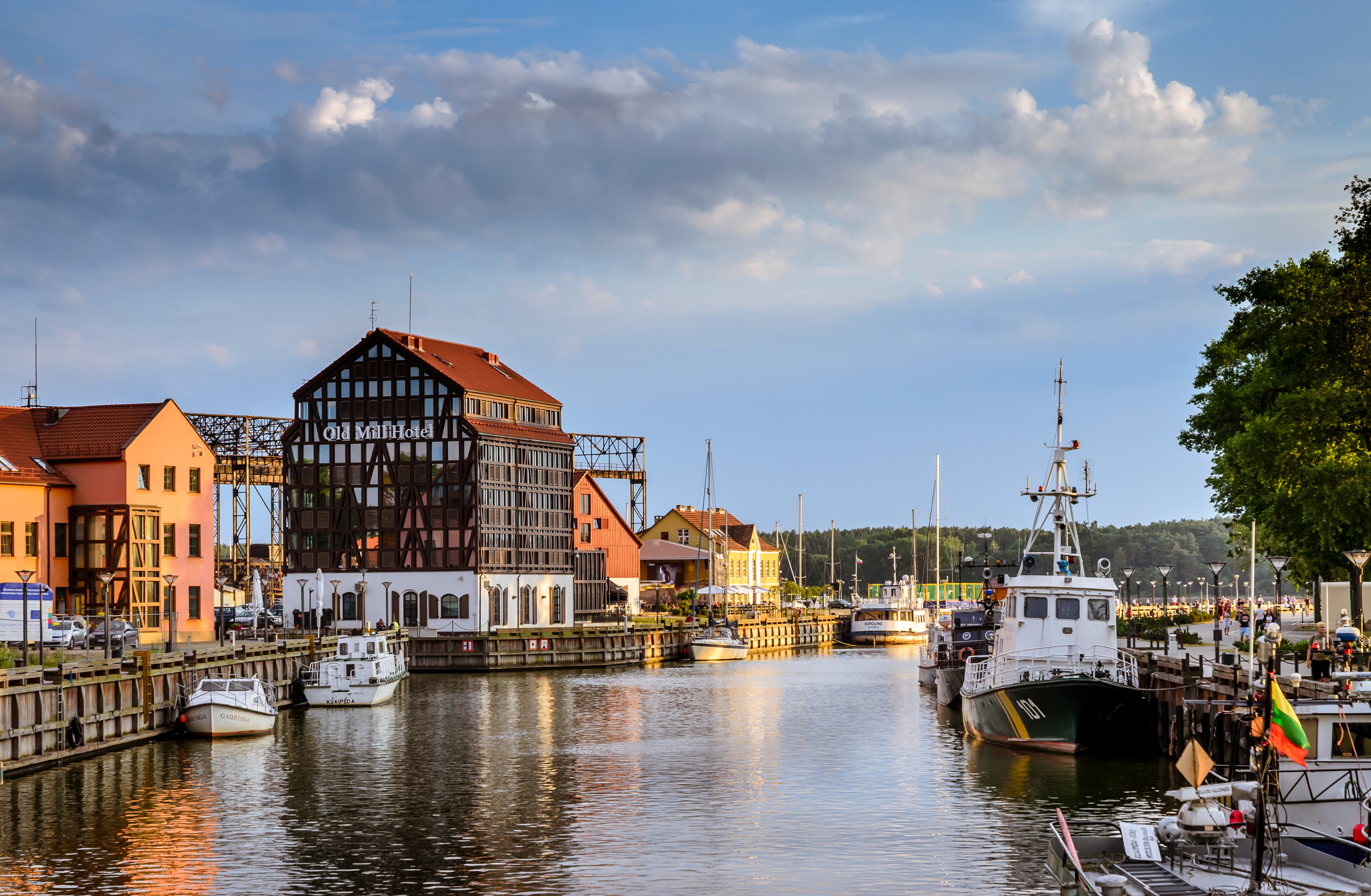
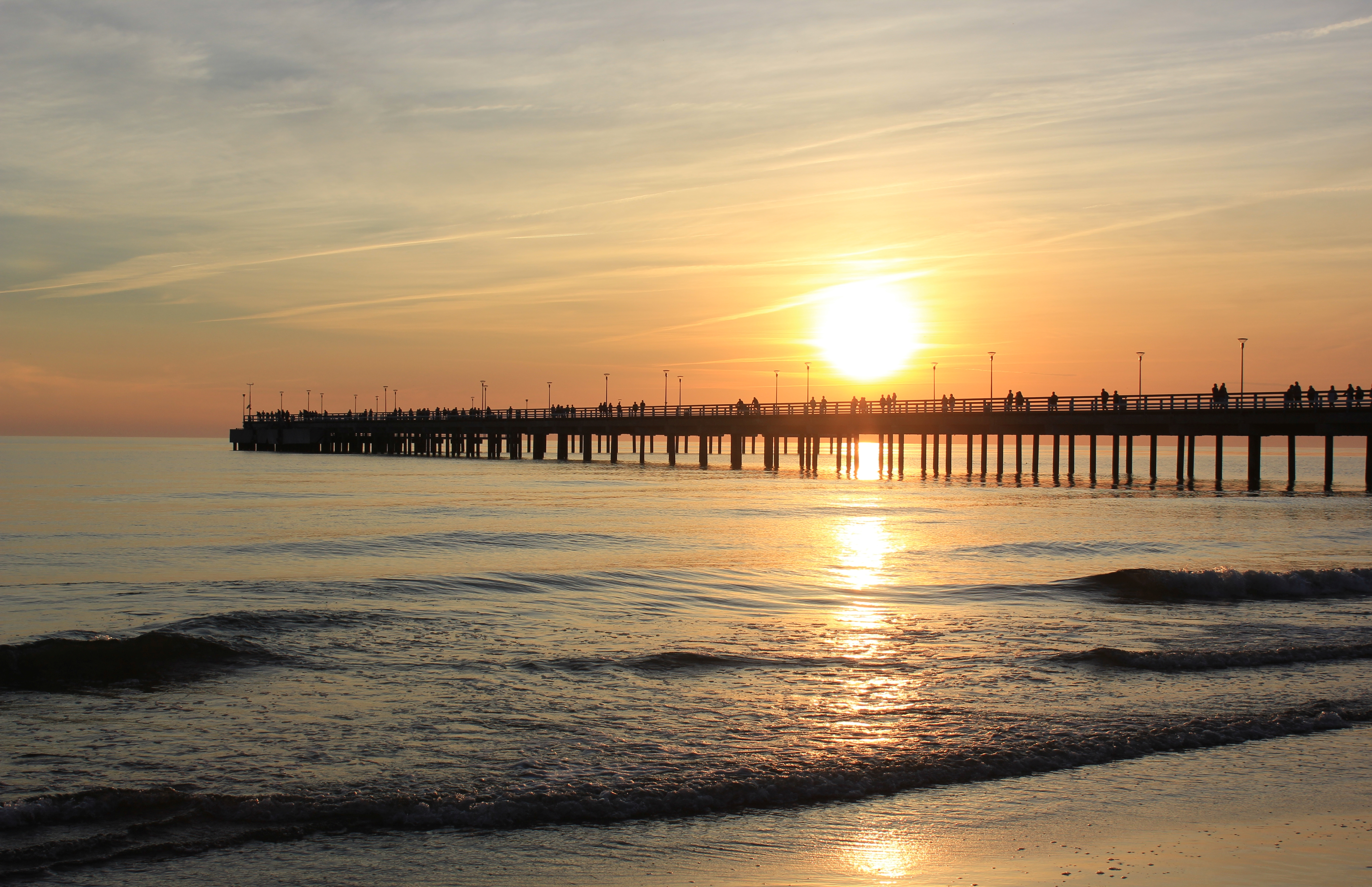
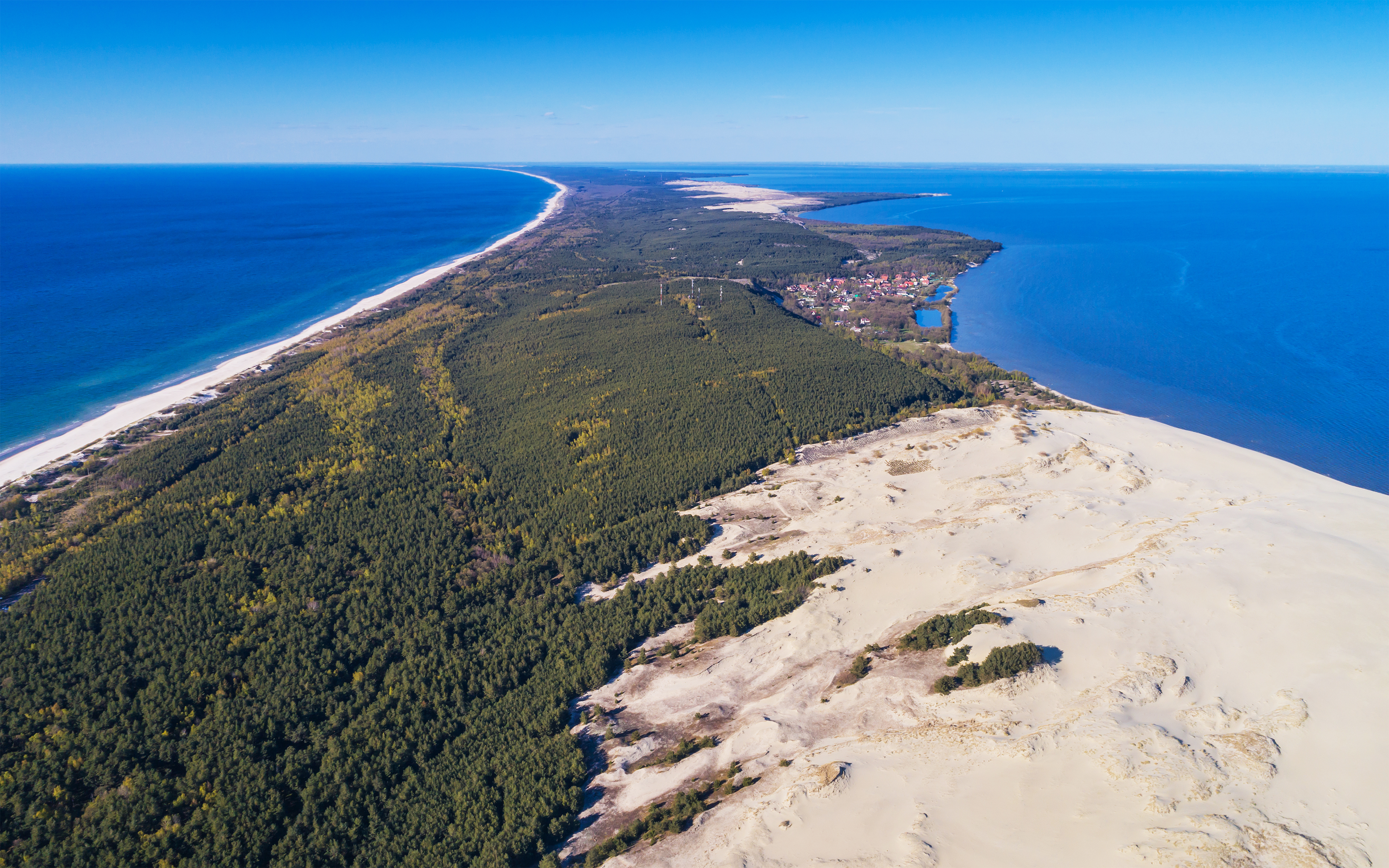
- From the top to bottom-right: Old Mill Hotel, Pilsotas, Palanga Pier, Samogitian Sanctuary, Curonian Spit.

- Flag Coat of arms

- Location of Klaipėda County
- Interactive map of Klaipėda County
- Country: Lithuania
- Administrative centre: Klaipėda
- Municipalities: List: Klaipėda City Municipality; Klaipėda District Municipality; Kretinga District Municipality; Neringa Municipality; Palanga City Municipality; Skuodas District Municipality; Šilutė District Municipality

Area
  - Total: 5,222 km^{2} (2,016 sq mi)
- (8% of the area of Lithuania)

Population (2020-01-01)
  - Total: 319,958
  - Rank: 3rd of 10 (11.4% of the population of Lithuania)
  - Density: 61.27/km^{2} (158.7/sq mi)

GDP
  - Total: €7.4 billion (2023)
  - Per capita: €22,500 (2023)
- Time zone: UTC+2 (EET)
  - Summer (DST): UTC+3 (EEST)
- ISO 3166 code: LT-KL
- HDI (2022): 0.880 very high · 3rd

Klaipėda County (Lithuanian: Klaipėdos apskritis) is one of ten counties in Lithuania, bordering Tauragė County to the southeast, Telšiai County to the northeast, Kurzeme in Latvia to the north, and Kaliningrad Oblast in Russia to the south. To the west is the Baltic Sea. It lies in the west of the country and is the only county to have a coastline and not be landlocked. Its capital is Klaipėda. On 1 July 2010, the county administration was abolished, and since that date, Klaipėda County remains as a territorial and statistical unit only.

== Geography ==
The topography of Klaipėda County is divided into three regions, the highest in the east and lowest in the west: the Western Zemaičiai Plateau in the east, the Western Zemaičiai Plain in the center, and the Pajurys Lowland in the west and on the Baltic coast.

Klaipėda County borders Kaliningrad Oblast, Russia, to the south via the Nemunas, which drains into the Curonian Lagoon. The Curonian Spit, a UNESCO World Heritage Site, is split between Klaipėda County, Lithuania and Kaliningrad Oblast, Russia. The Lithuanian side of the spit is separated from mainland Lithuania via a small opening between Klaipėda and Smiltynė where the Curonian Lagoon drains into the Baltic Sea.

Skuodas district is the source of the Šventoji, which flows north into Courland, Latvia, back down into Klaipeda County before draining into the Baltic Sea at the coastal settlement of Šventoji.

=== Climate ===
Being the only county on Lithuania's Baltic coast, Klaipėda County is distinguished by its maritime climate. There is little variation in mean daily temperature. On average, winters are relatively warmer and summers are relatively cooler than the rest of Lithuania. Storms and foggy spells are frequent in winter. In locations throughout the county, annual precipitation rates can reach as high as 876 mm per year.

== Municipalities ==
Municipalities are:

Klaipėda City Municipality
Klaipėda District Municipality
Kretinga District Municipality
Neringa Municipality
Palanga City Municipality
Skuodas District Municipality
Šilutė District Municipality

== Cities ==
1. Klaipėda
2. Palanga
3. Kretinga
4. Šilutė
5. Gargždai
6. Skuodas
7. Neringa
8. Priekulė
9. Salantai

== Demographics ==
As of 2020, Klaipėda County's population was 319,958. Approximately 69% is urban, while the remaining 30% are rural. It is the third most populous county in Lithuania.

=== Gender ===
As of 2020, approximately 52% of people are female and 47% are male.

=== Ethnic groups ===
The ethnic composition in 2001 was:

- Lithuanians 84.2%
- Russians 11.4%
- Ukrainians 1.3%
- Belarusians 1.0%
- Poles 0.3%
- Other 1.8%

== Gallery ==
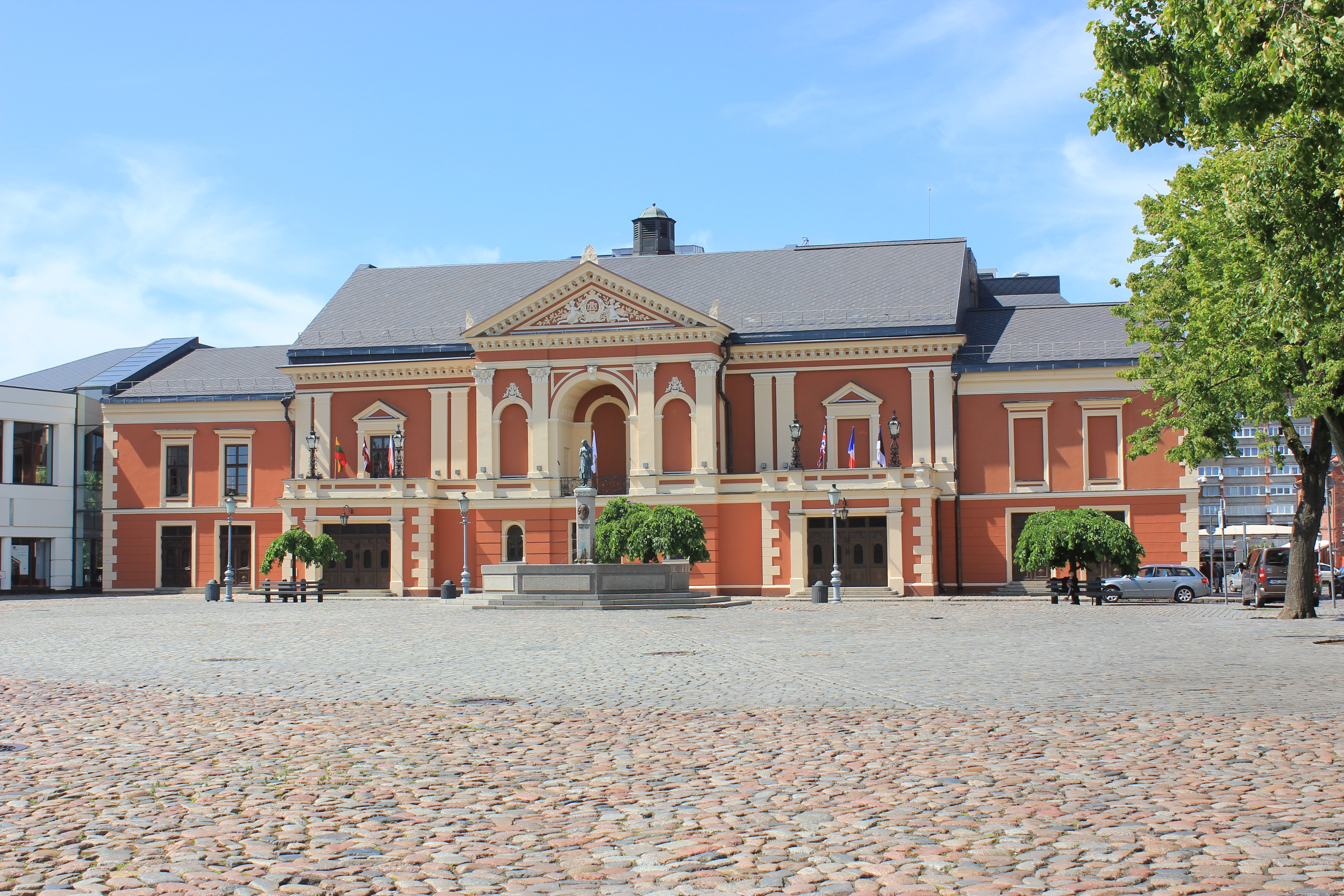
Klaipėda Drama Theatre

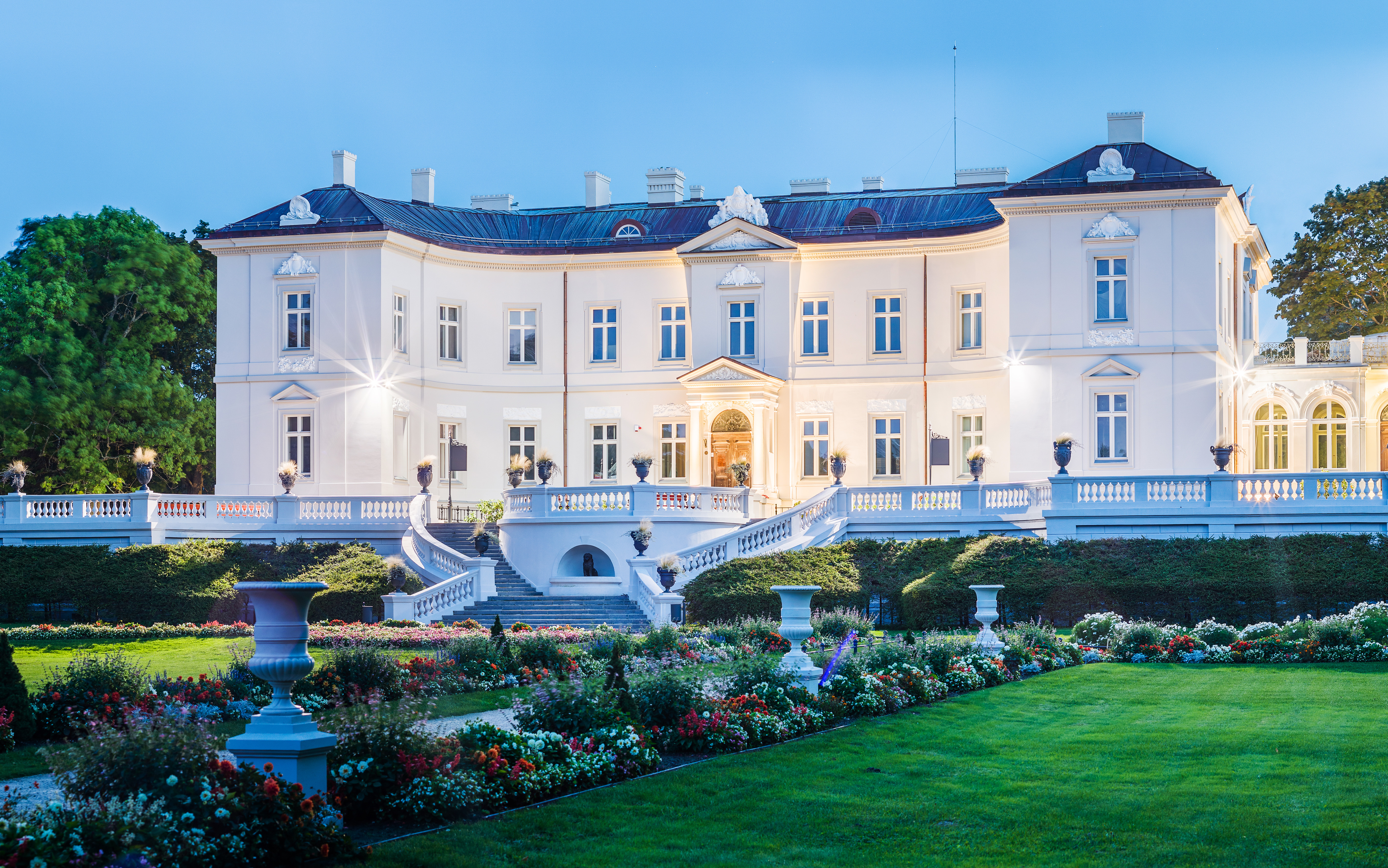
Tiškevičiai Palace, Palanga

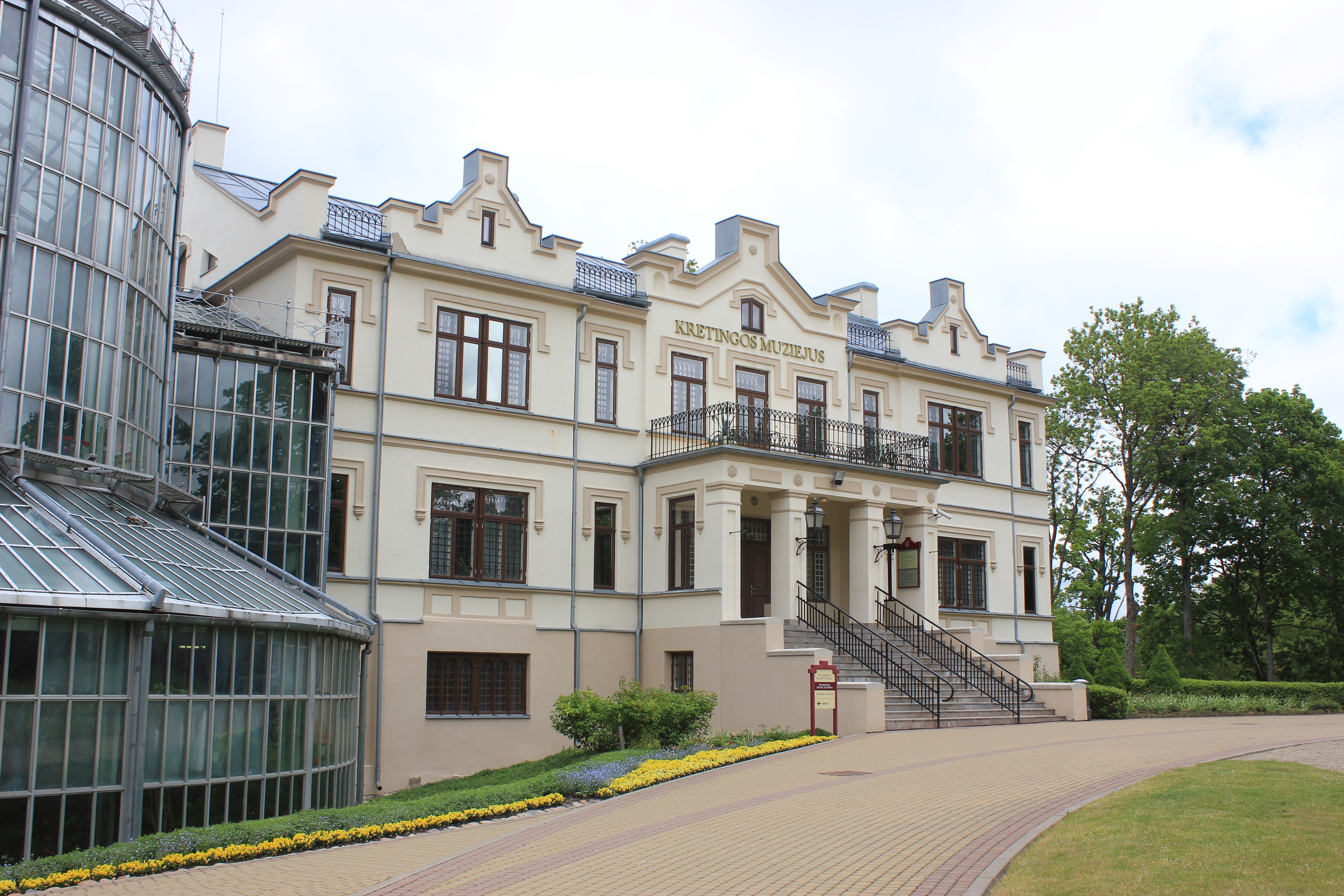
Kretinga Museum

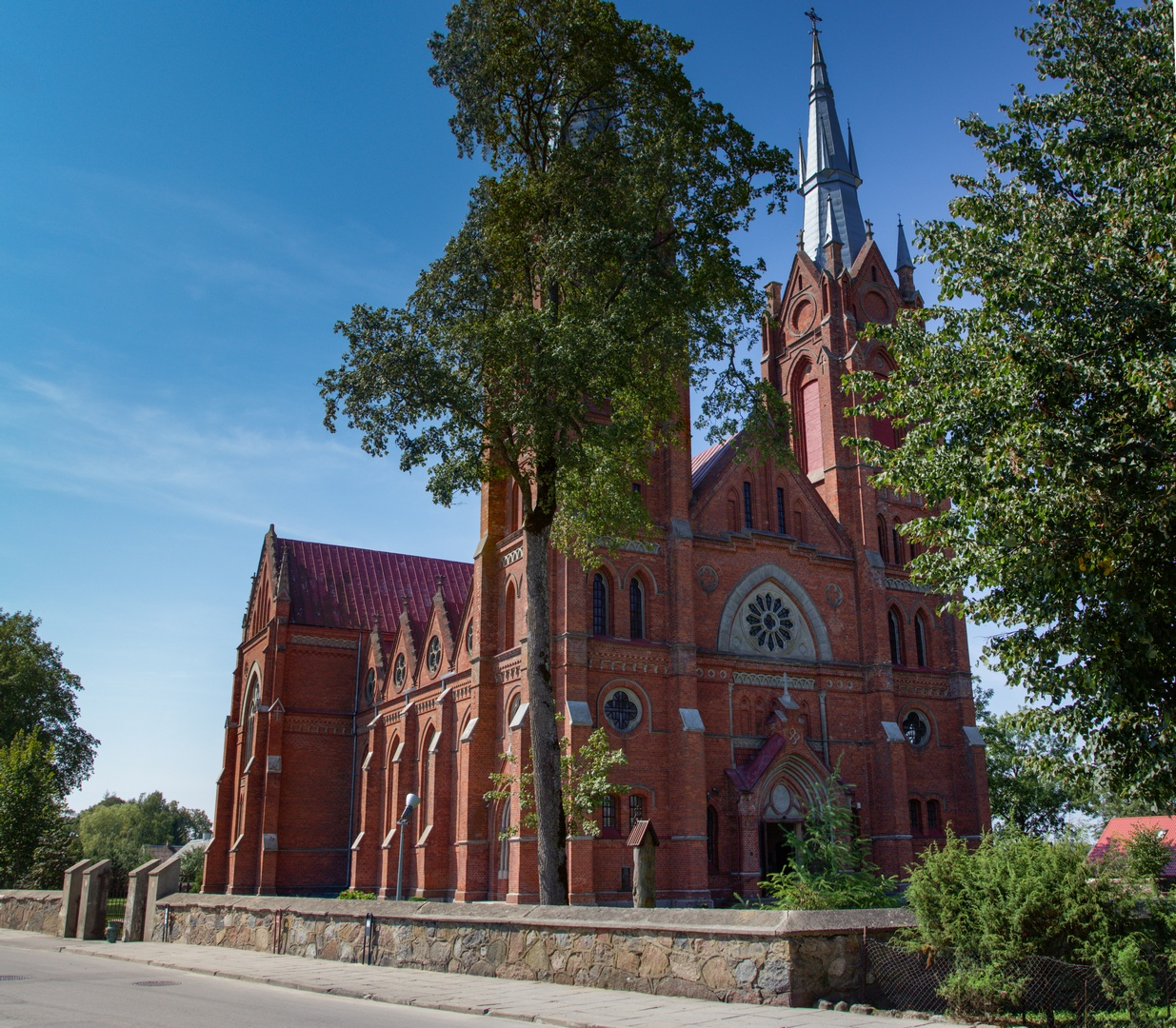
Church of the Assumption in Salantai

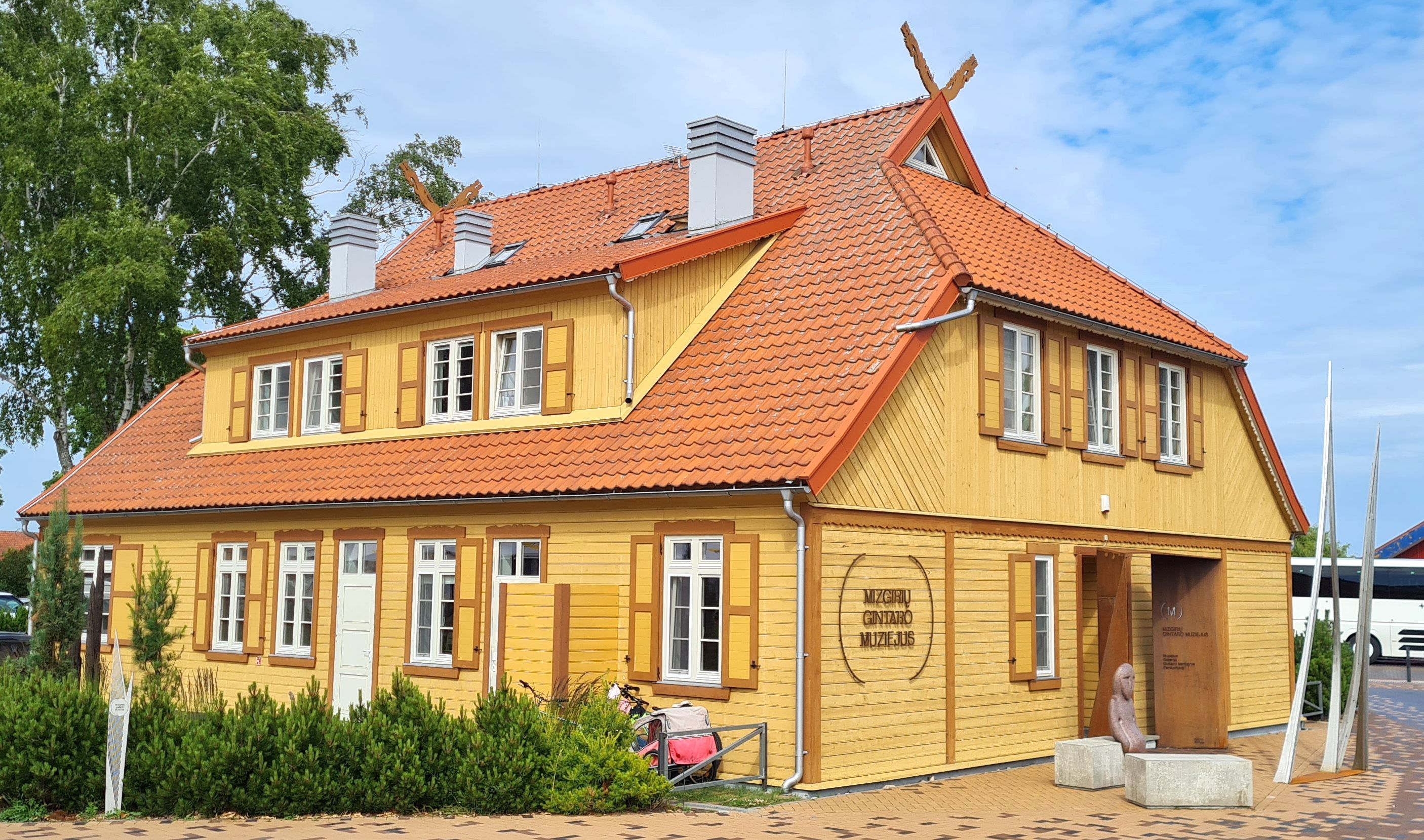
Mizgiris Amber Museum
