= Dzūkija =

Lithuanian ethnographic region

Coordinates: 54.3333°N 24.0000°E

Dzūkija Dainava
- Ethnographic region of Lithuania
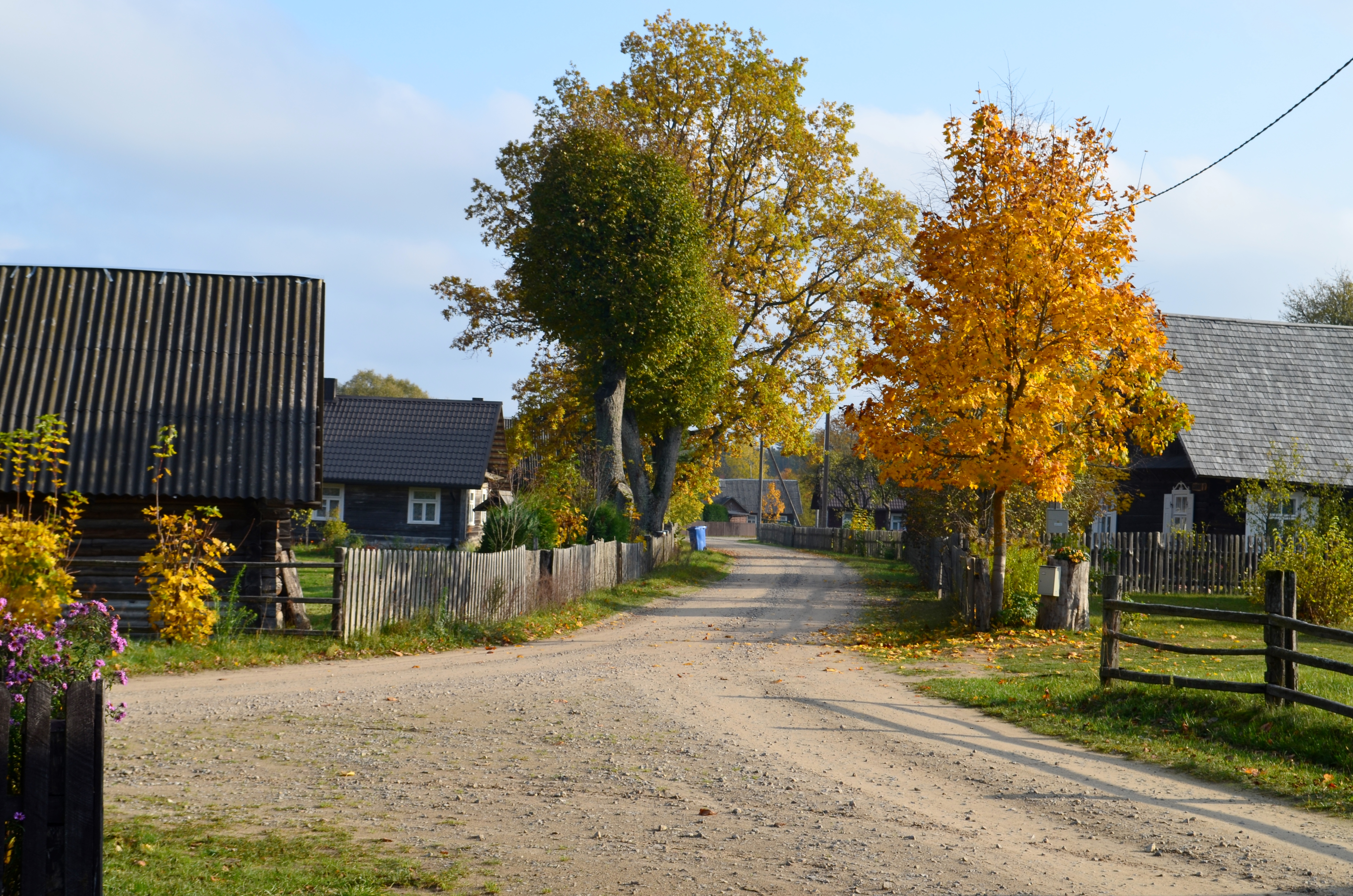
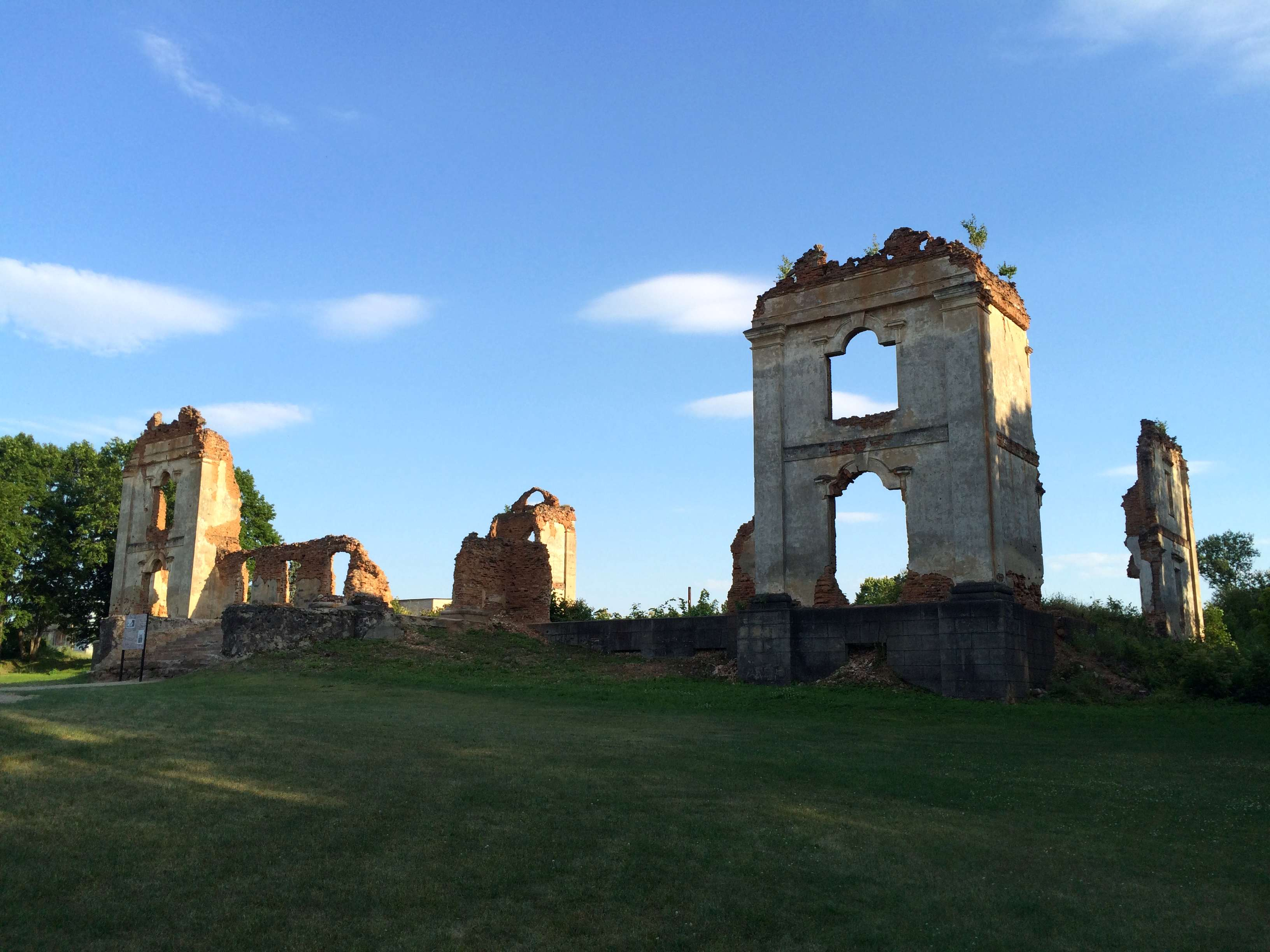
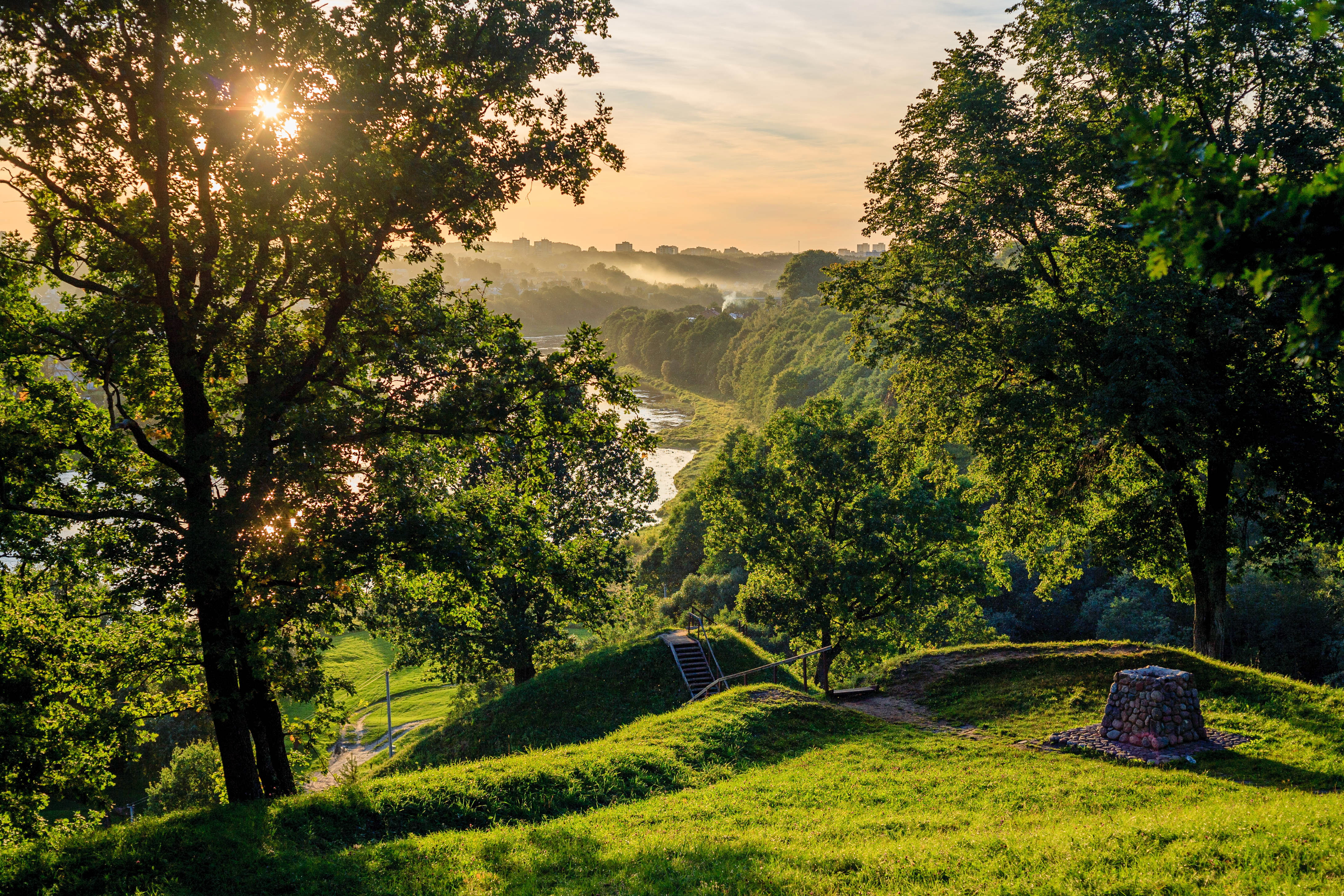
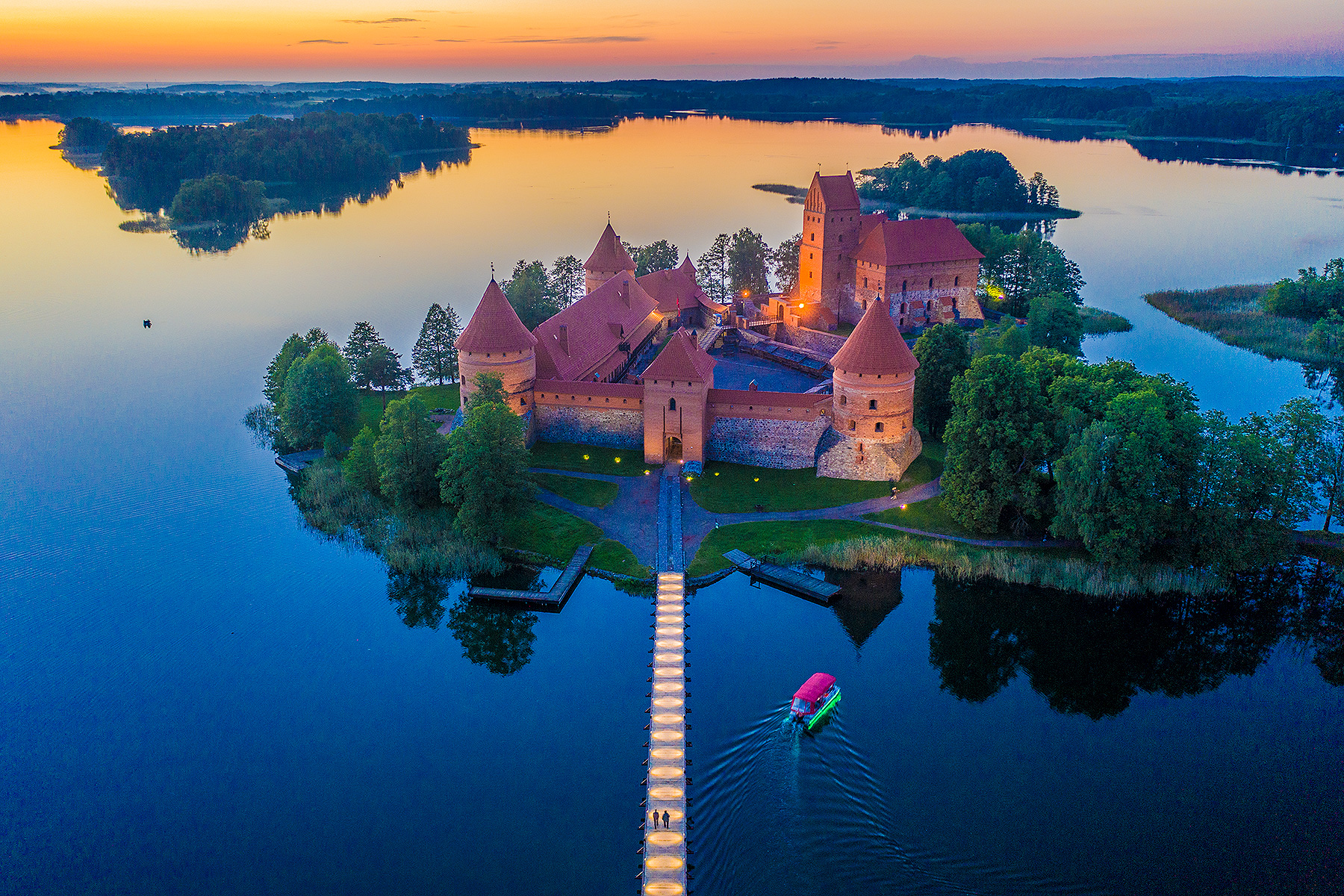
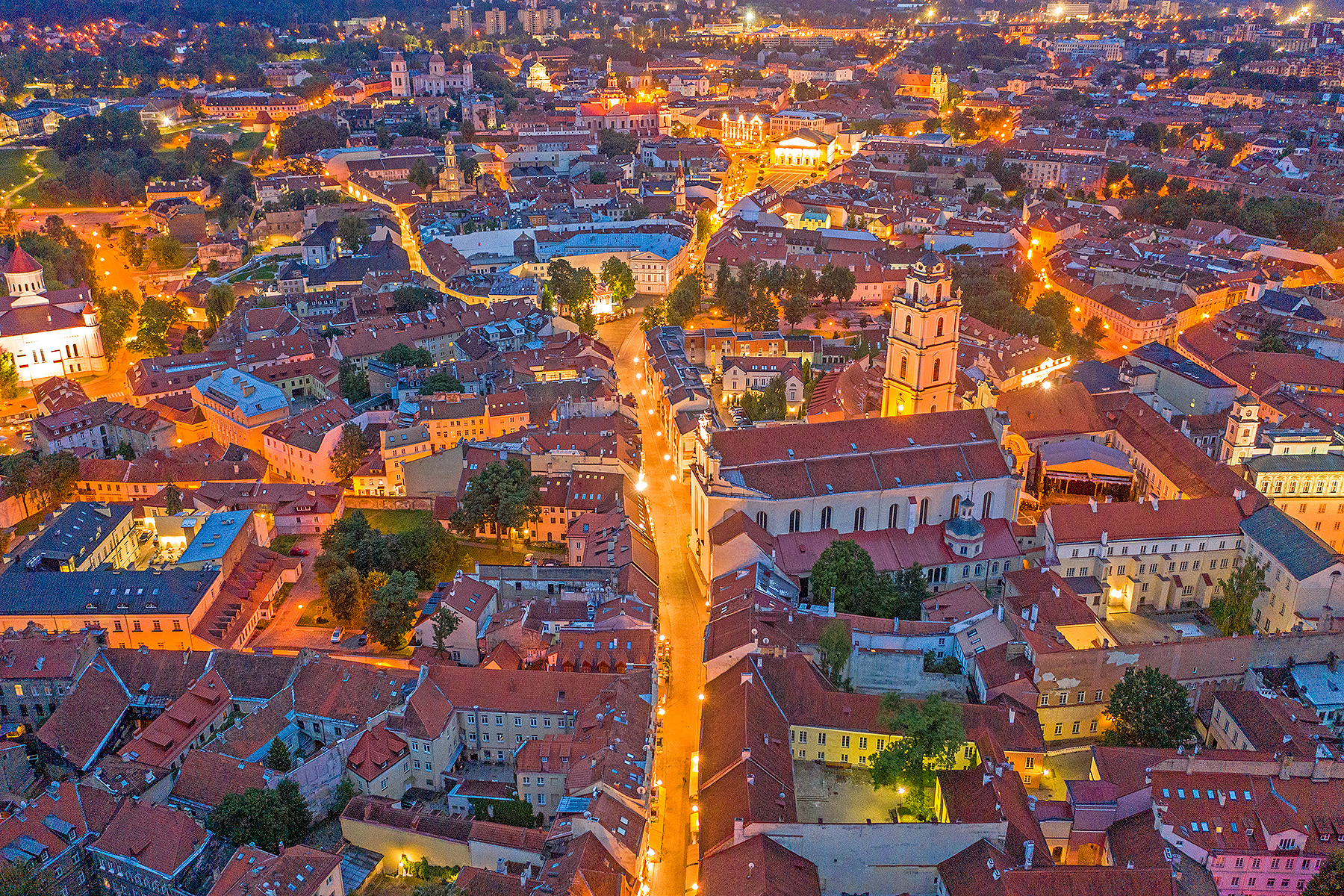
- From top, left to right: Ethnographic village of Musteika in Dzūkija National Park; Merkinė Manor of the former Paulava Republic; Hillfort in Alytus; Trakai Island Castle in Trakai Historical National Park; Vilnius Old Town

- Flag Coat of arms
- Motto: Ex gente bellicosissima populus laboriosus
- Location of Dzūkija within Lithuania
- Country: Lithuania
- Capital and largest city: Alytus

Area
  - Total: 12,114 km^{2} (4,677 sq mi)

Population (2025)
  - Total: 926,462
  - Density: 76.479/km^{2} (198.08/sq mi)
- Demonyms: Dzūkian (English); dzūkas (masc) and dzūkė (fem) (Lithuanian)
- Time zone: UTC2 (CET (GMT +2))

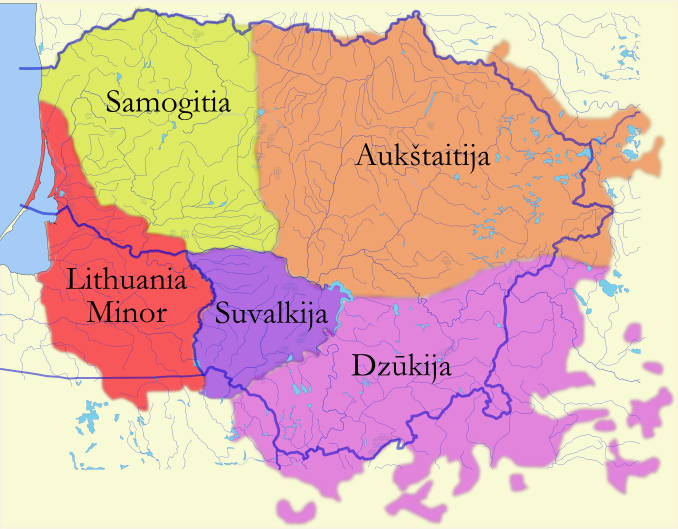
Map of Lithuanian regions showing "Greater" Dzūkija (fuchsia).

Dzūkija (Lithuanian: [dzuːkʲˈjɐ]) or Dainava is one of five ethnographic regions of Lithuania. The region encompasses the entirety of Alytus County, along with the municipalities of Birštonas, Elektrėnai, Prienai, Šalčininkai, Švenčionys, Trakai, Vilnius City, and Vilnius District. Dzūkija is the most populous of the five regions of Lithuania with an estimated 926.462 residents in 2025 (including Vilnius), but geographically the third-largest, with a land area of 12.114 square kilometres (4.677 sq mi) (as well including Vilnius). Traditionally, Alytus is regarded as the capital of the region and largest city. Despite its geographic location within Dzūkija boundaries, culturally Vilnius is rarely considered part of any traditional ethnographic region. Dzūkija is a cultural region defined by traditional lifestyles and dialects of the local Lithuanian population and has never been defined as a political or administrative unit.

== Geography ==
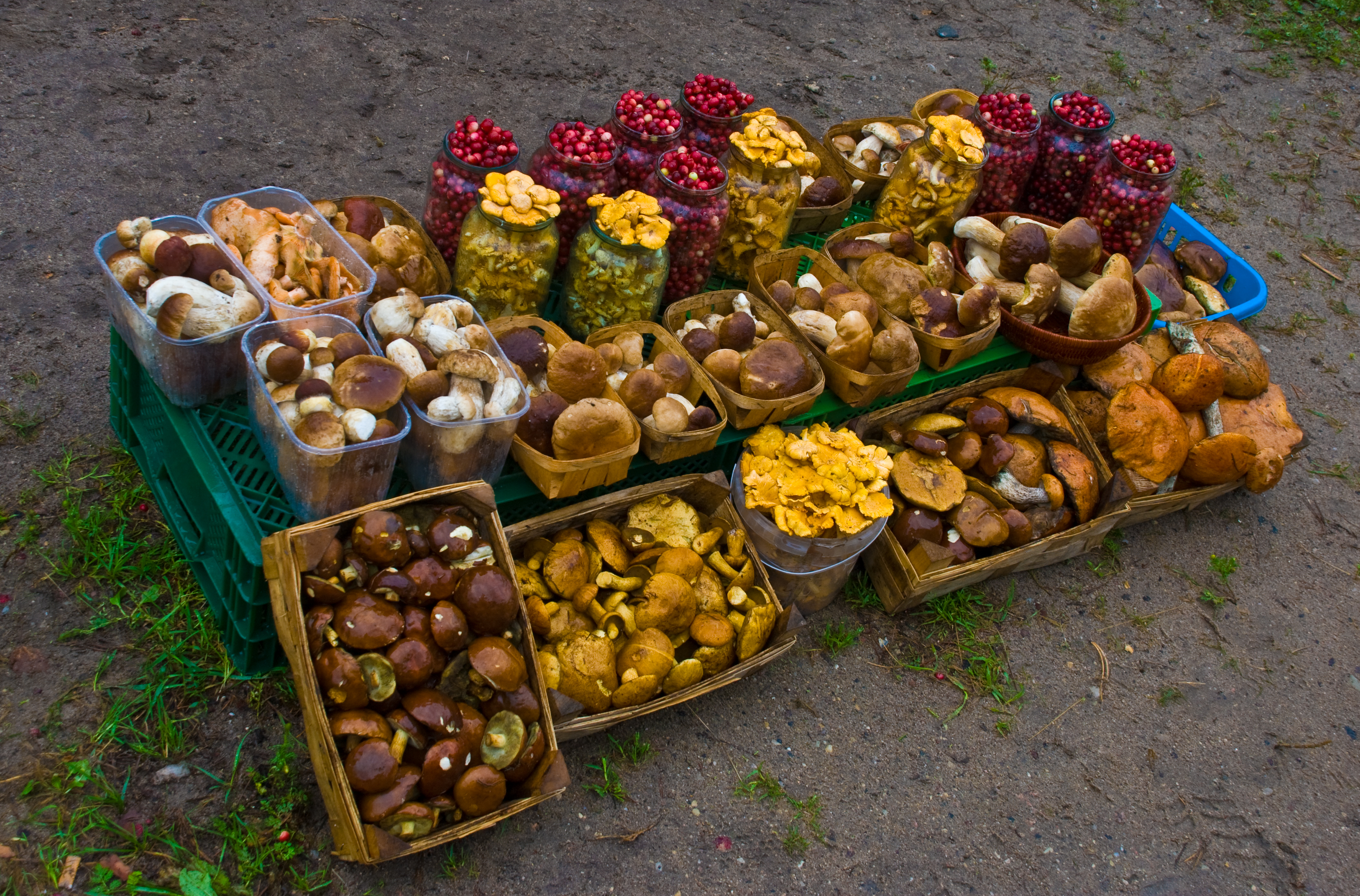
Infertile land and large forests meant that farmers had to supplement their harvest with mushrooms and wild berries, which are still important for the local economy

Dzūkija is situated in southeastern Lithuania, and consists of Alytus County and southern Vilnius County. Historically, it extended into what is now northeastern Poland (Podlaskie Voivodeship) and northwestern Belarus (Grodno Region).

Large parts of Dzūkija have light sandy soil, unsuited for agriculture. Therefore, the region is densely covered with pine forests, one of which is Dainava Forest, the largest in Lithuania. The Čepkeliai Marsh, the largest swamp in Lithuania, is situated in the region, near the border with Belarus. Dzūkija is also the most sparsely populated region in Lithuania, with average population density dropping below 15 people per square kilometer in Varėna district municipality. Due to lower harvests in infertile soil, the region was relatively poorer than the rest of Lithuania. Farmers had to supplement their yields with edible mushrooms and berries collected in the forests. Mushroom hunting remains an important part of the local economy.

Two of the five national parks in Lithuania are to be found in Dzūkija: Dzūkija National Park east of Varėna (established there in 1991), and Trakai National Historic Park near Trakai (1992).

== Subdivisions ==
Subdivision	Note
Alytus County	entire county
Trakai District Municipality	entire municipality
Elektrėnai Municipality	entire municipality
Šalčininkai District Municipality	entire municipality
Birštonas Municipality	entire municipality
Vilnius City Municipality	entire municipality
Vilnius District Municipality	excluding Paberžė Eldership
Prienai District Municipality	Jieznas Eldership and Stakliškės Eldership
Švenčionys District Municipality	Magūnai Eldership, Pabradė Eldership, Sariai Eldership, Cirkliškis Eldership and Strūnaitis Eldership

== Demographics ==
The largest settlements (by population) are:

- Vilnius - 602,430
- Alytus – 51,353
- Druskininkai – 12,978
- Elektrėnai – 12,536
- Varėna – 7,866
- Šalčininkai – 6,825
- Trakai – 5,720
- Pabradė – 4,636
- Nemenčinė – 4,495

== Language ==
People in Dzūkija traditionally speak the Dzūkian dialect (also known as South Aukštaitian), which is a sub-dialect of the Aukštaitian dialect. As elsewhere in Lithuania, local dialects such as these are dying out in bigger as people adopt the standard Lithuanian through schools and mass media, but still used by older generation in smaller villages like Marcinkonys, Zervynos and others.

The very first Lithuanian handwritten texts from the early 16th century show traits of the Dzūkian dialect.

== Coat of arms ==
Grand coat of arms of Dzūkija

The coat of arms of Dzūkija pictures a white armored warrior with a pollaxe in a blue shield. The blue color symbolizes loyalty and strength. The grand coat of arms is supported by two lynxes and has a Latin motto Ex gente bellicosissima populus laboriosus (Out of most warring tribe – industrious people). These symbols were created by heraldic artist Arvydas Každailis in 2003 using the historical symbols of Trakai. Dzūkija was part of the Duchy of Trakai and later Trakai Voivodeship from the 14th to late 18th century. The same image was used for the coat of arms of Alytus County, officially adopted in 2004. The coat of arms is a modified version of the coat of arms of Trakai district, which depicts a knight with a spear in a red shield. This symbol was taken from a seal used by Duke of Trakai Kęstutis (died in 1382). The motto honors the memory of the Yotvingians, one of the ancient Baltic tribes which were considered fine warriors that lived in what is now Dzūkija.

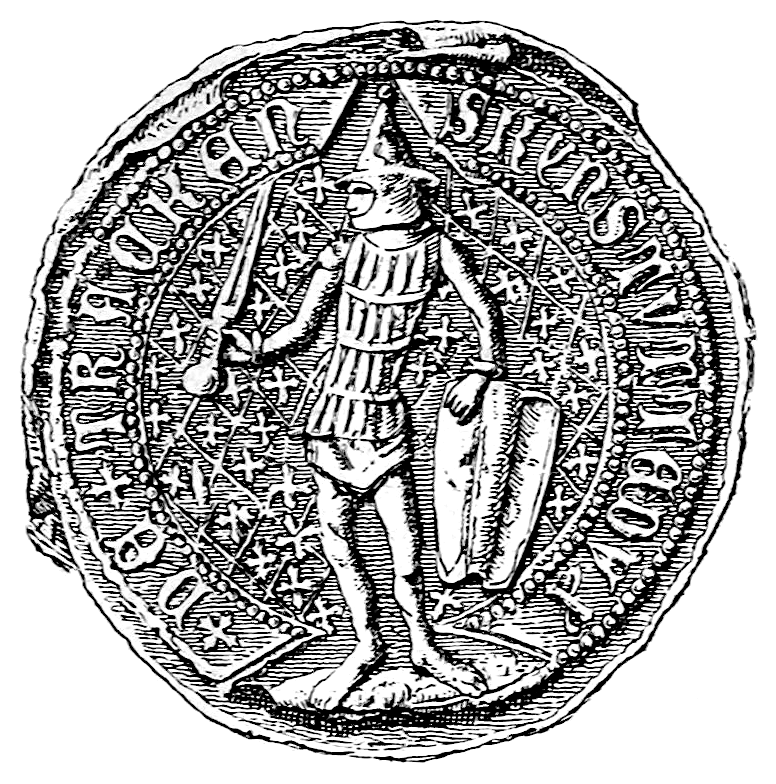
Seal of Duke Kęstutis from 1379.

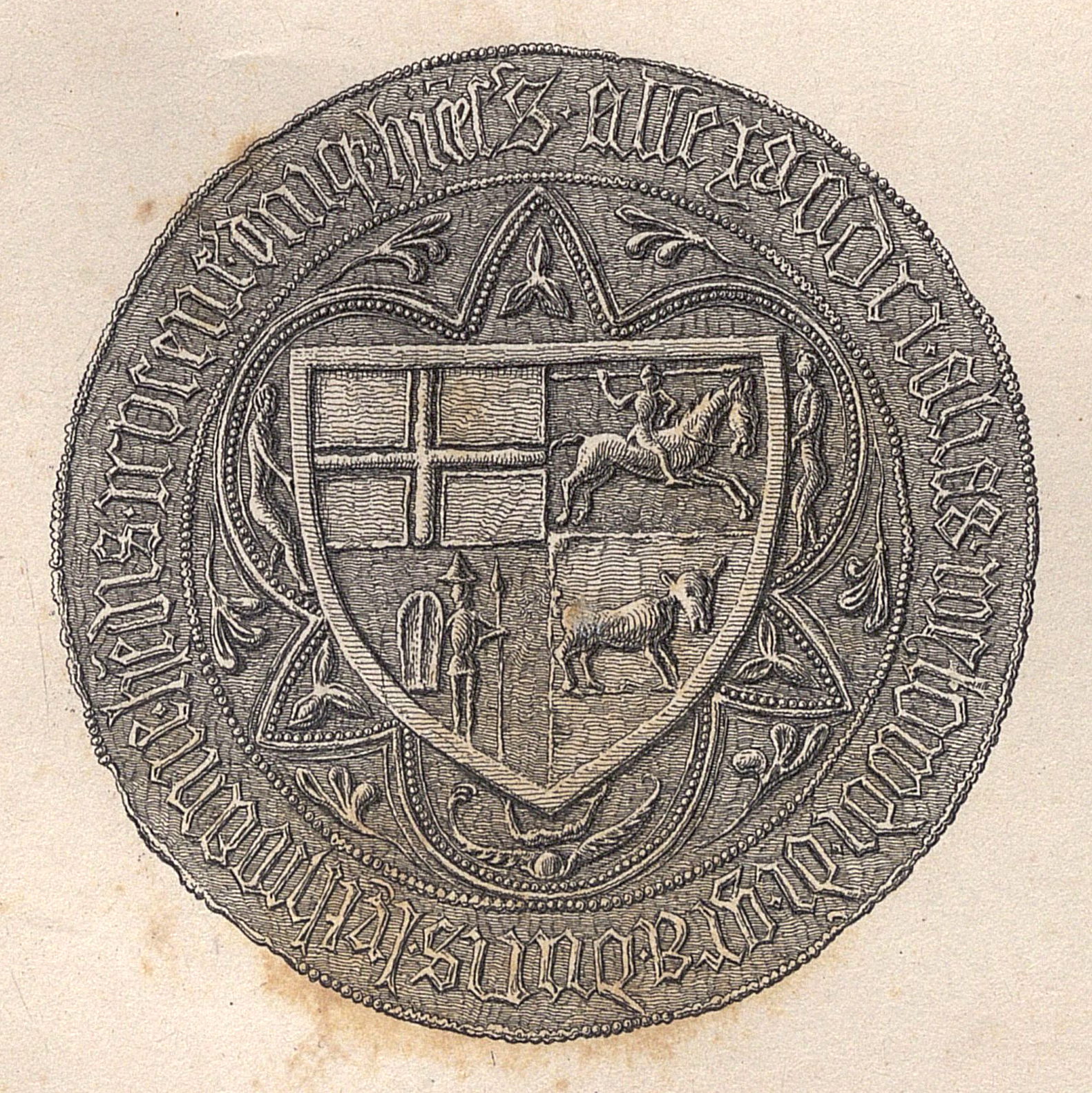
Coat of arms of Duchy of Trakai on the lower left corner of seal of Vytautas the Great, 1404.

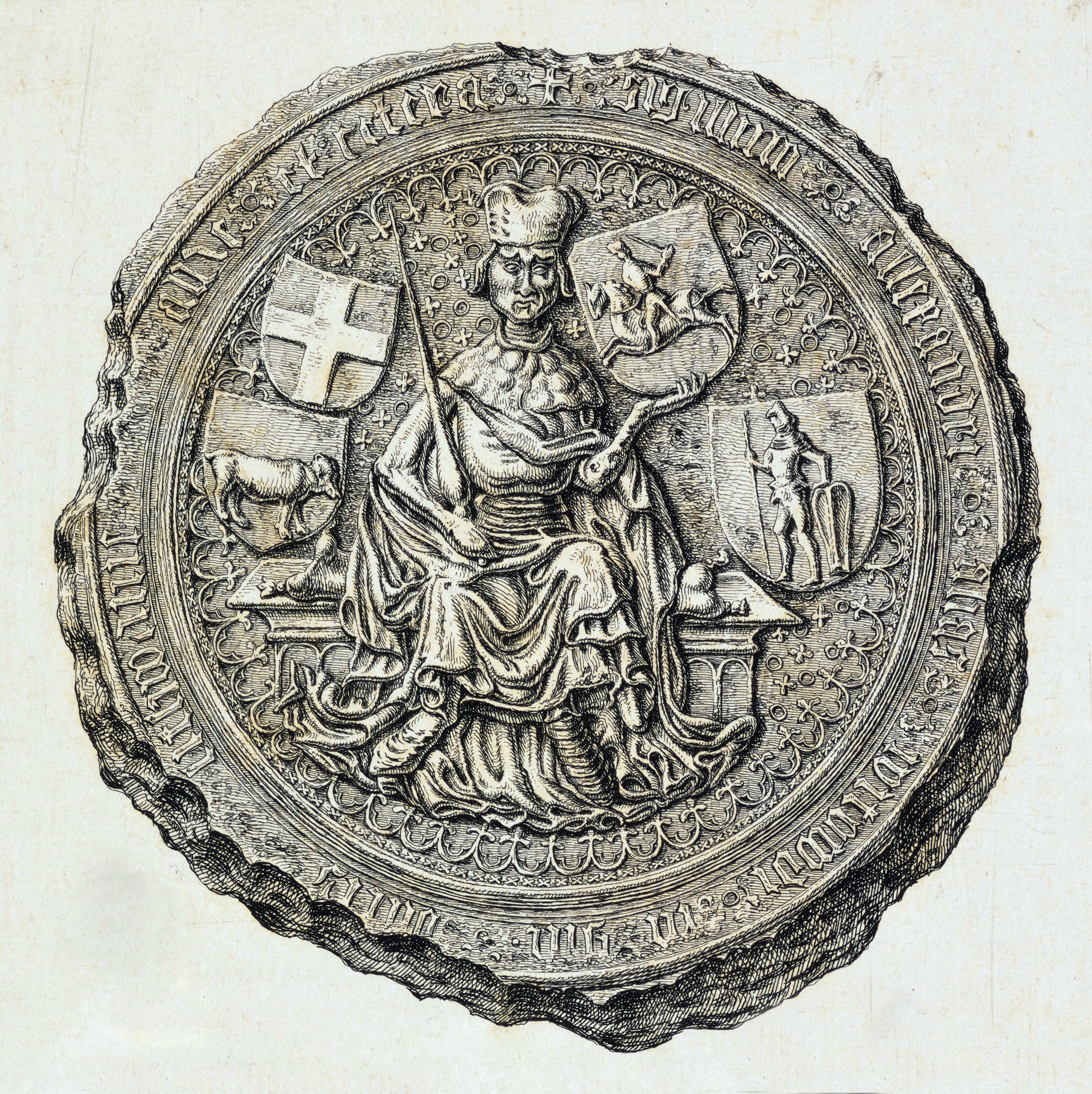
Coat of arms of Duchy of Trakai on the lower right corner of seal of Vytautas, 1407.

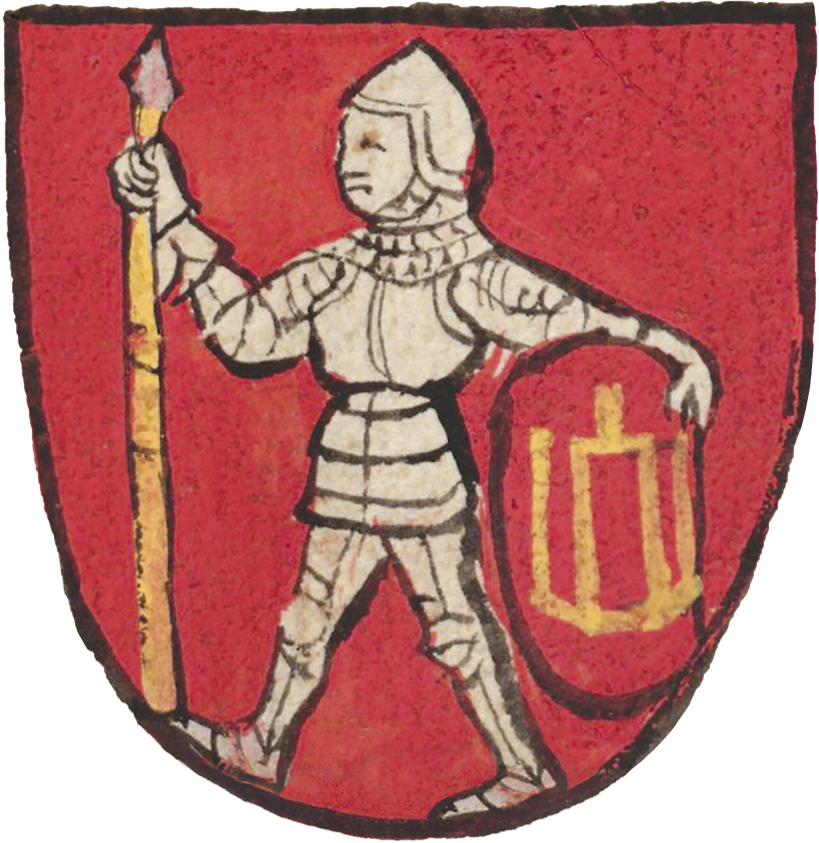
Coat of arms of Trakai Voivodeship from around the 15th century.

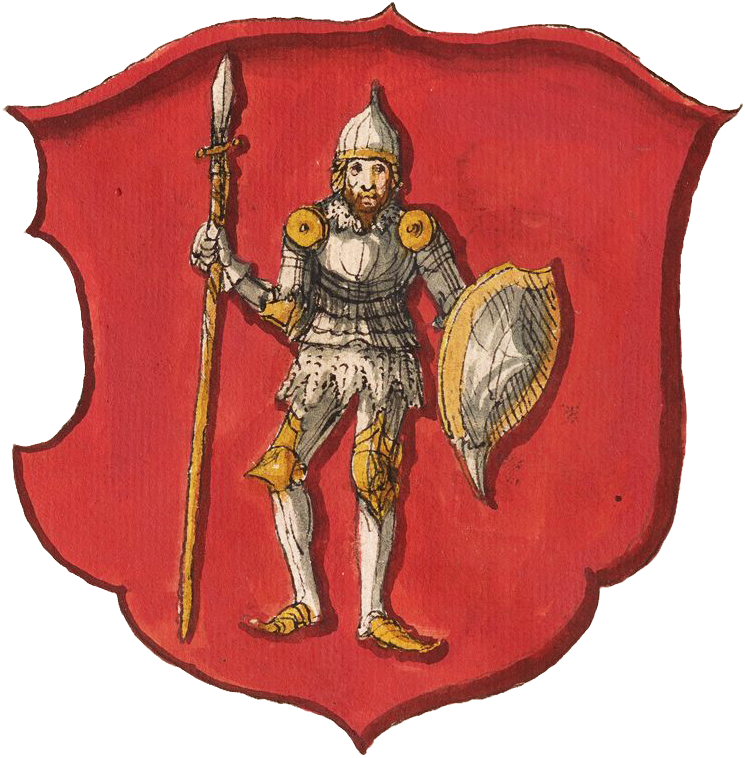
Coat of arms of Trakai Voivodeship from around the 16th century.

Coat of arms of Trakai District Municipality.

Coat of arms of Alytus County.
