= Sužionys Eldership =

Sužionys Eldership Sužionių seniūnija
- Eldership
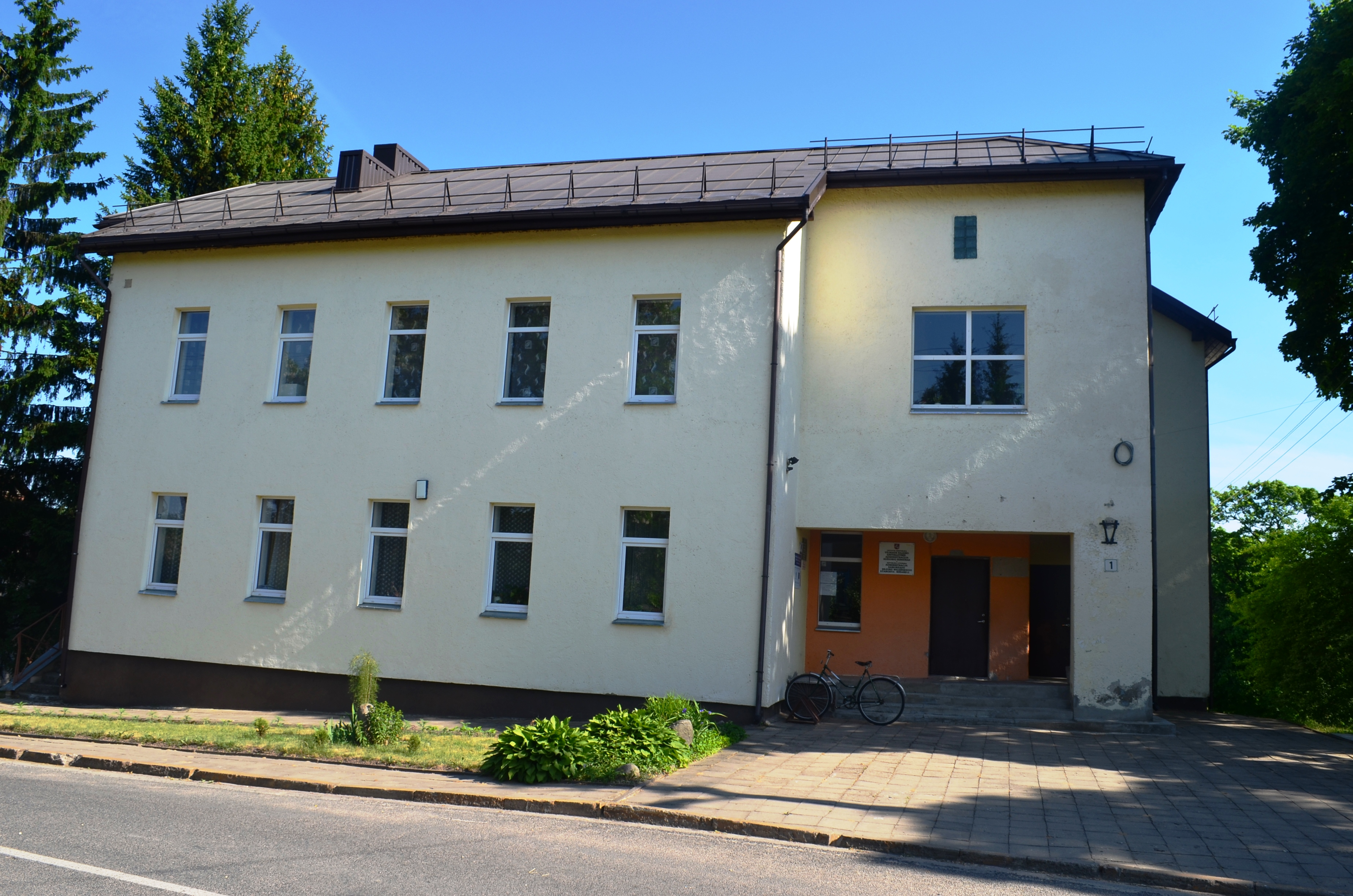
- Administration building

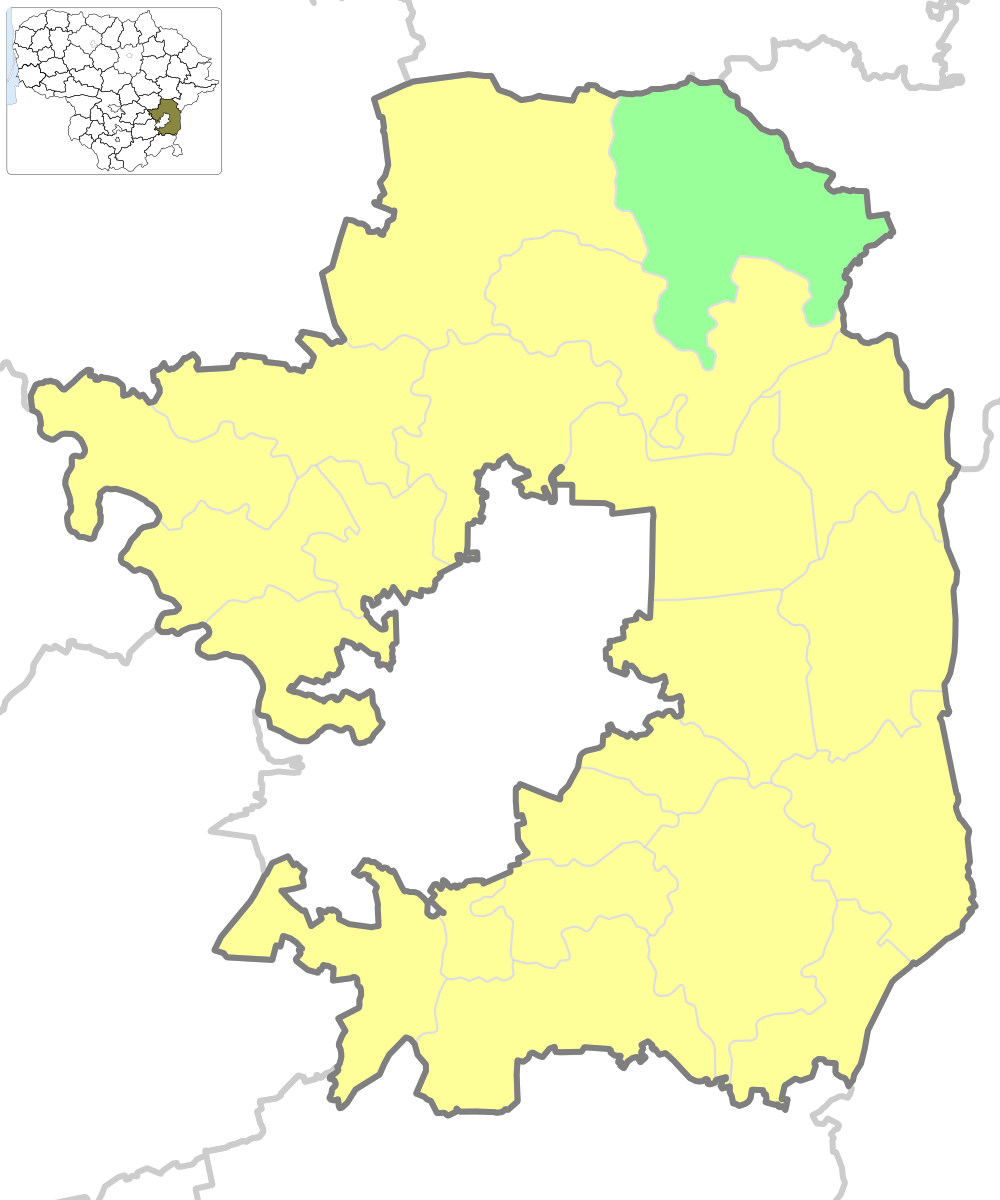
- Location of Sužionys Eldership
- Country: Lithuania
- Ethnographic region: Dzūkija
- County: Vilnius County
- Municipality: Vilnius District Municipality
- Administrative centre: Sužionys

Area
  - Total: 160 km^{2} (62 sq mi)

Population
  - Total: 1,621
  - Density: 10/km^{2} (26/sq mi)
- Time zone: UTC+2 (EET)
  - Summer (DST): UTC+3 (EEST)
- Website: https://www.vrsa.lt

Sužionys Eldership (Lithuanian: Sužionių seniūnija) is an eldership in Lithuania, located in Vilnius District Municipality, north of Vilnius.

== Ethnic composition ==
According to 2011 National Census data, the ethnic composition is as follows:

- Poles - 83%
- Lithuanians - 9%
