= Pociškė =

- Village
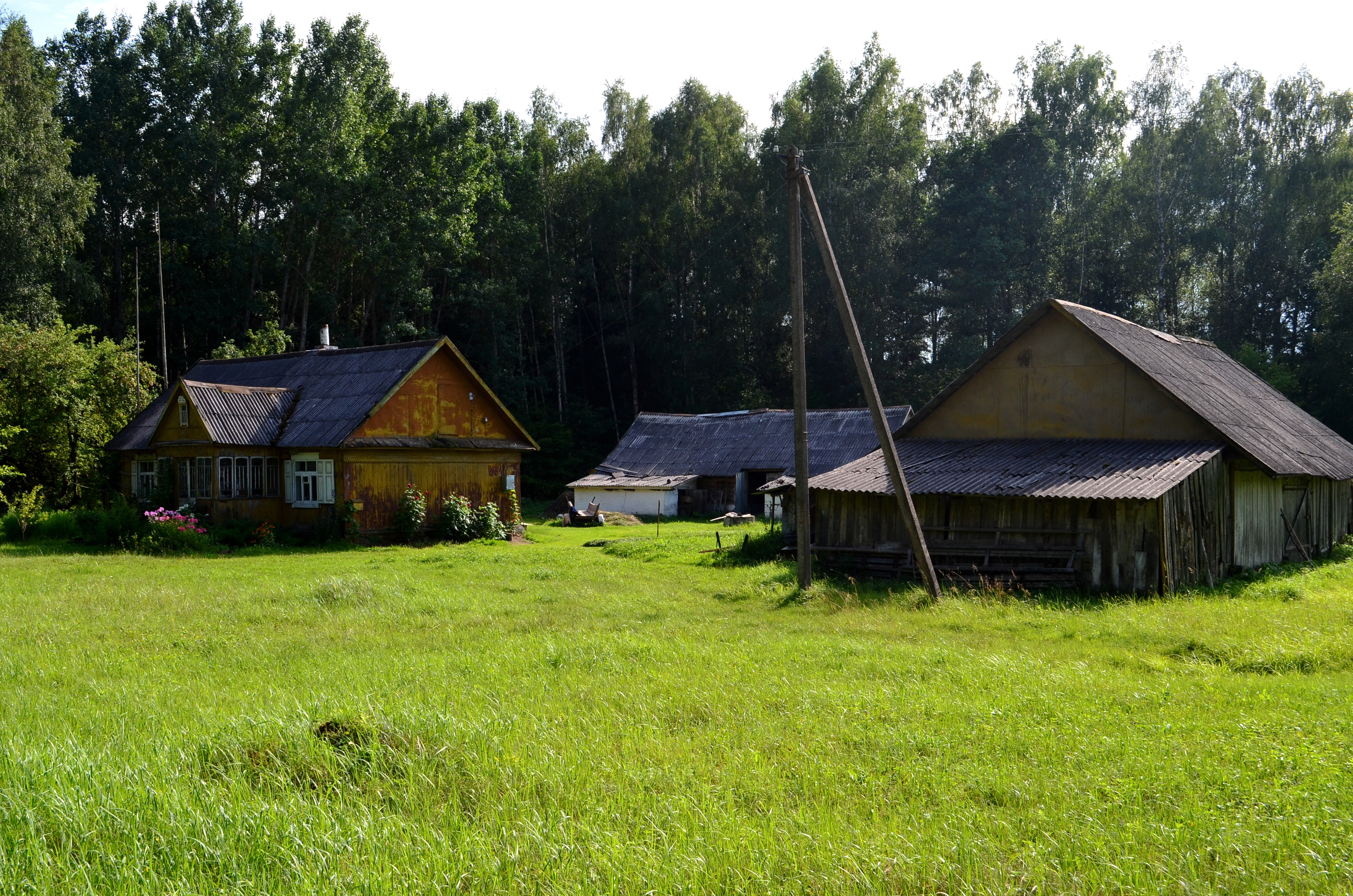

- Location in Lithuania
- Coordinates: 55°13′16″N 26°34′37″E
- Country: Lithuania
- County: Vilnius County
- Municipality: Švenčionys district municipality
- Eldership: Adutiškis eldership

Population (2011)
  - Total: 5
- Time zone: UTC+2 (EET)
  - Summer (DST): UTC+3 (EEST)

Pociškė is a village in Švenčionys District, Lithuania. It is located 8 kilometres south of the Adutiškis. According to the 2011 census, it had 5 residents.

== Notable people ==
- Leon Żebrowski (1876−1954), priest, member of the Polish Senate
