= Kaltanėnai =

- Town
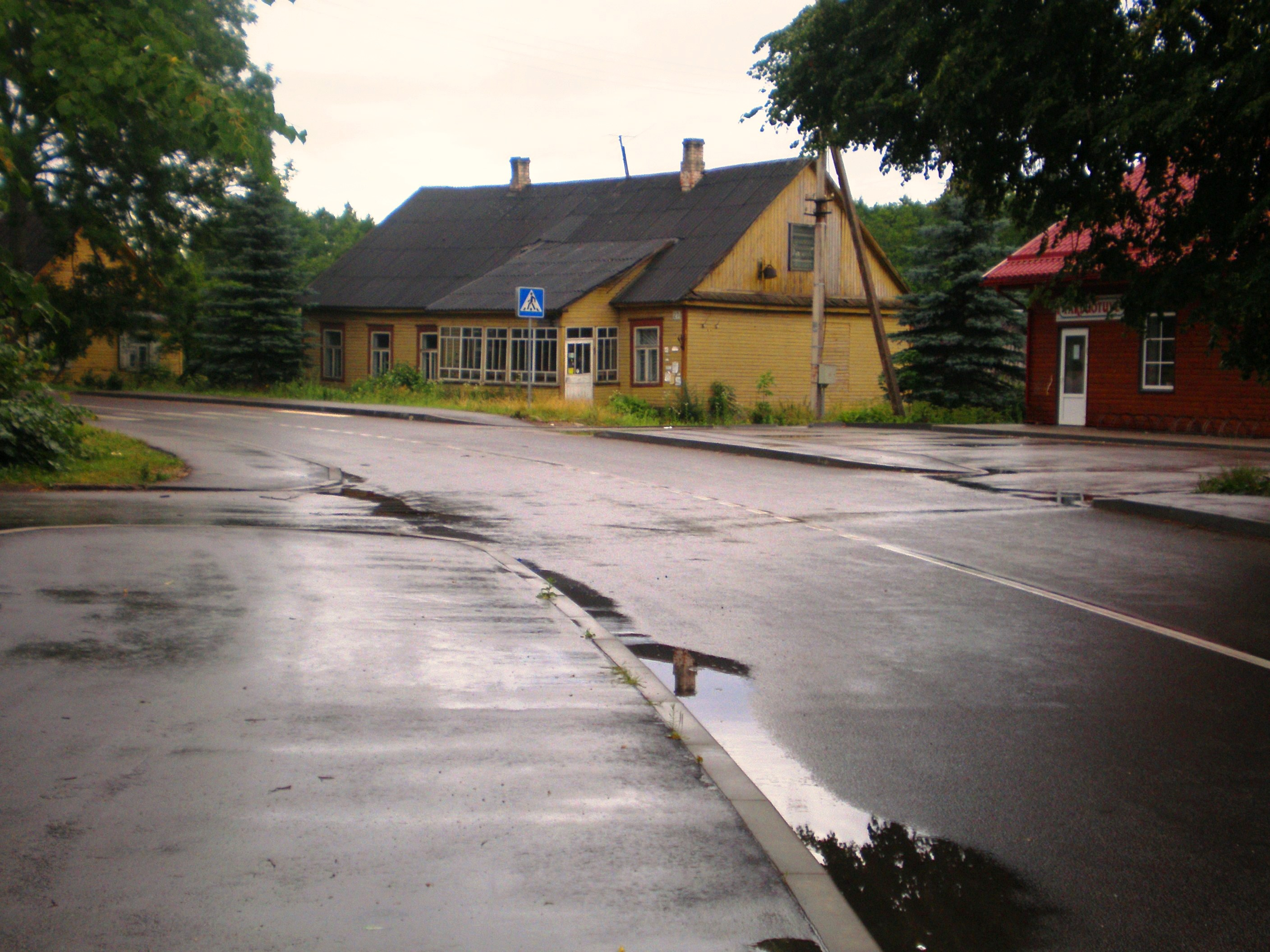

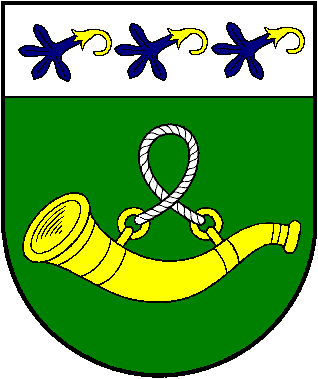
- Coat of arms

- Location of Kaltanėnai in Lithuania
- Coordinates: 55°15′22″N 25°59′20″E
- Country: Lithuania
- County: Vilnius County
- Municipality: Švenčionys district municipality
- Eldership: Kaltanėnai eldership

Population (2021)
  - Total: 190
- Time zone: UTC+2 (EET)
  - Summer (DST): UTC+3 (EEST)

Kaltanėnai (Polish: Kołtyniany) is a town in Švenčionys district municipality, Vilnius County, east Lithuania. According to the Lithuanian census of 2021, the town has a population of 190 people. The town has a Catholic church.

== History ==
In July 1941, an Einsatzgruppen of Lithuanian collaborators murdered the local Jewish population in several mass executions.
