= Nemenčinė Eldership =

Nemenčinė Eldership Nemenčinės seniūnija
- Eldership
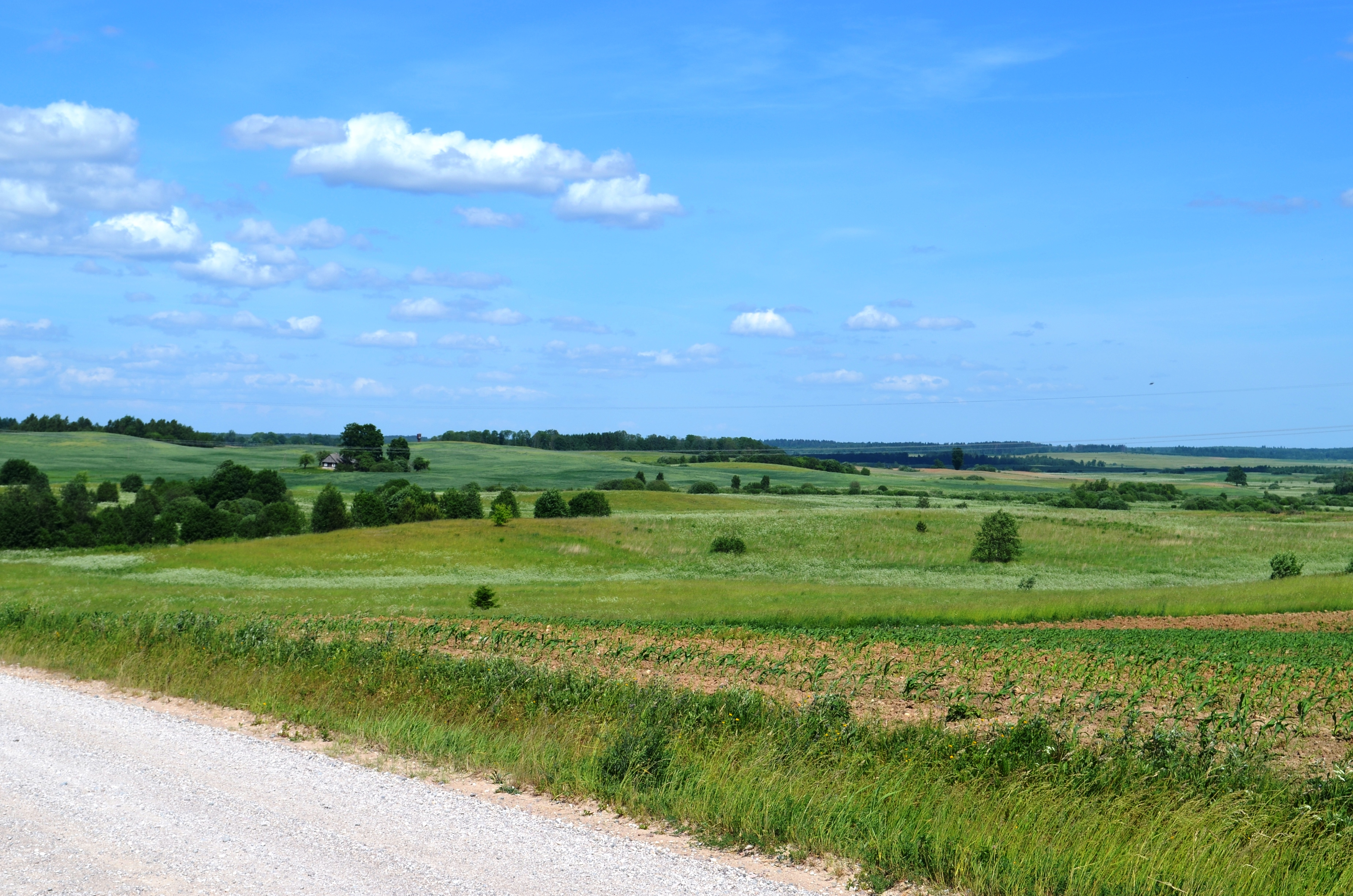

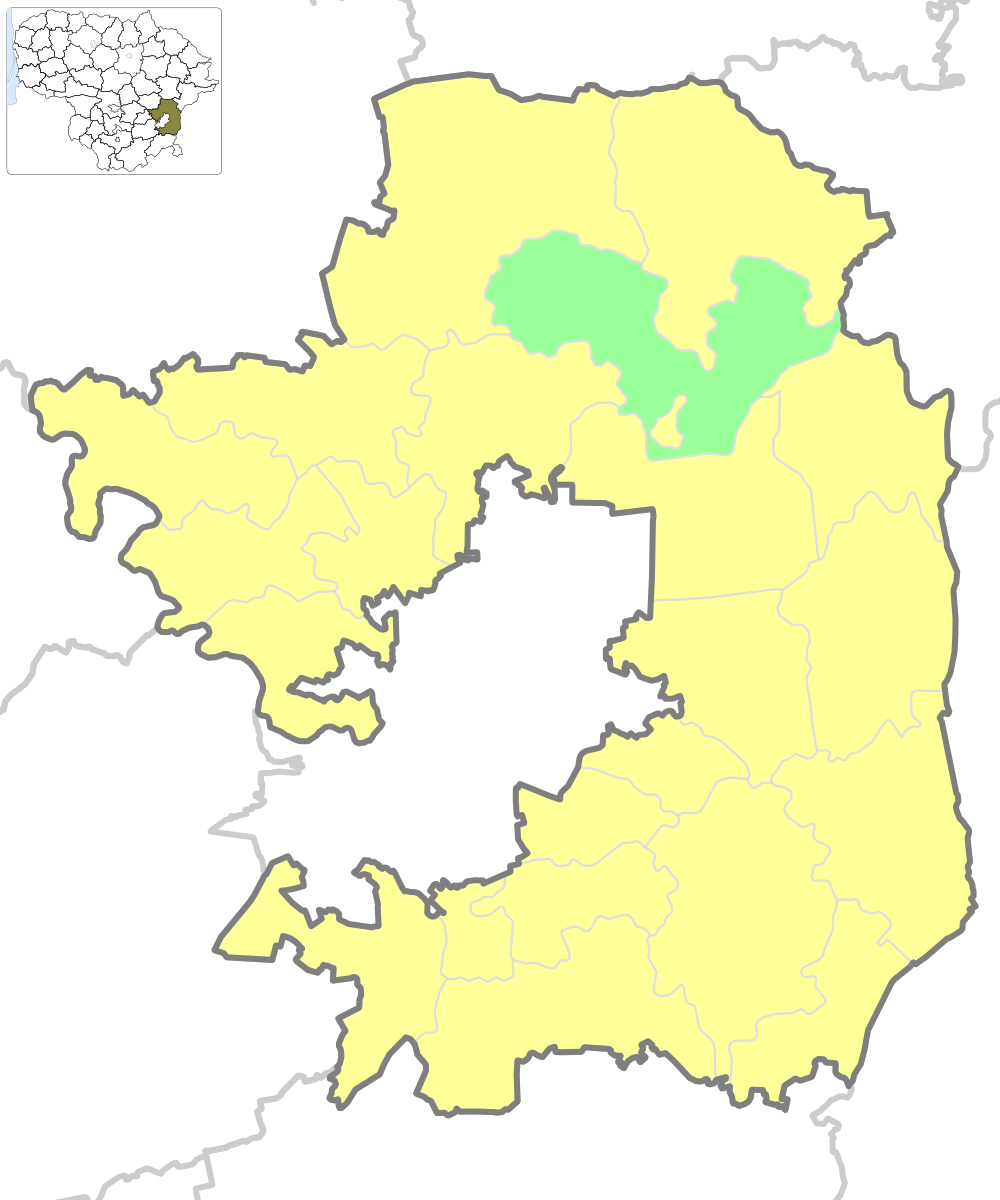
- Location of Nemenčinė Eldership
- Country: Lithuania
- Ethnographic region: Dzūkija
- County: Vilnius County
- Municipality: Vilnius District Municipality
- Administrative centre: Nemenčinė

Area
  - Total: 153 km^{2} (59 sq mi)

Population
  - Total: 3,565
  - Density: 23.3/km^{2} (60.3/sq mi)
- Time zone: UTC+2 (EET)
  - Summer (DST): UTC+3 (EEST)
- Website: https://www.vrsa.lt

Nemenčinė Eldership (Lithuanian: Nemenčinės seniūnija) is an eldership in Lithuania, located in Vilnius District Municipality, north of Vilnius.

== Ethnic composition ==
According to 2011 National Census data, the ethnic composition is as follows:

- Poles - 66%
- Lithuanians - 25%
- Russians - 7%
