= Svirkos =

- Village
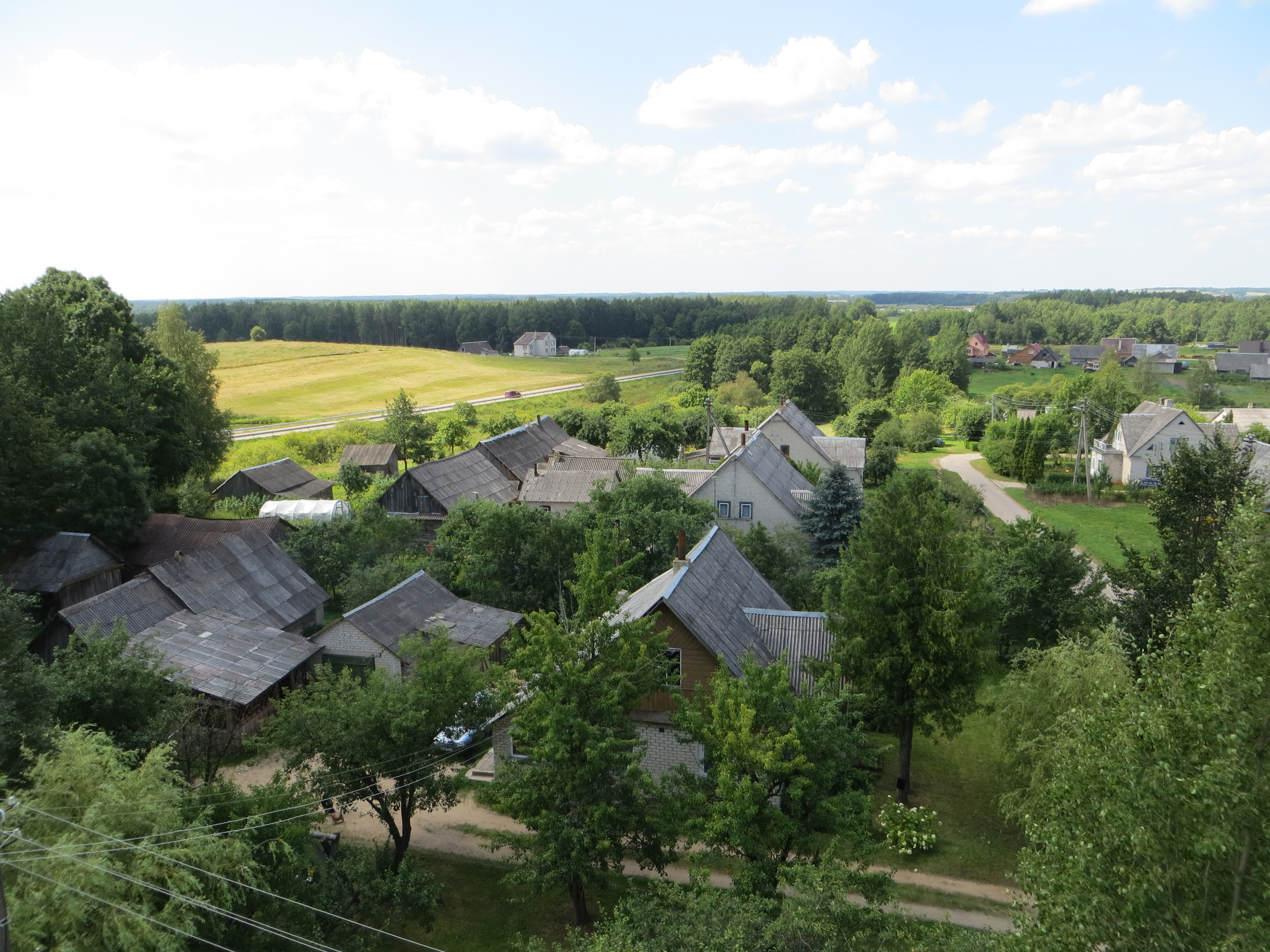
- Svirkos

- Flag Seal

- Location in Lithuania
- Coordinates: 55°10′19″N 26°26′24″E
- Country: Lithuania
- Ethnographic region: Aukštaitija
- County: Vilnius County
- Municipality: Švenčionys district municipality
- Elderships: Svirkos eldership

Population (2021)
  - Total: 244
- Time zone: UTC+2 (EET)
  - Summer (DST): UTC+3 (EEST)

Svirkos is a village in Švenčionys district municipality, in Vilnius County, in northeastern Lithuania. According to the 2021 census, the village has a population of 244 people.

Svirkos village is located c. 20 kilometres (12 mi) from Švenčionys, 2 kilometres (1.2 mi) from Girdėnai (the nearest settlement) and 5 kilometres (3.1 mi) from the Belarusian border.

== Demographics ==
Historical population

Year	Pop.	±%
1959	99	—
1979	283	+185.9%
1989	436	+54.1%

Year	Pop.	±%
2001	359	−17.7%
2011	316	−12.0%
2021	244	−22.8%

Source: 1959, 1979, 1989, 2011
