= Labanoras =

- Town
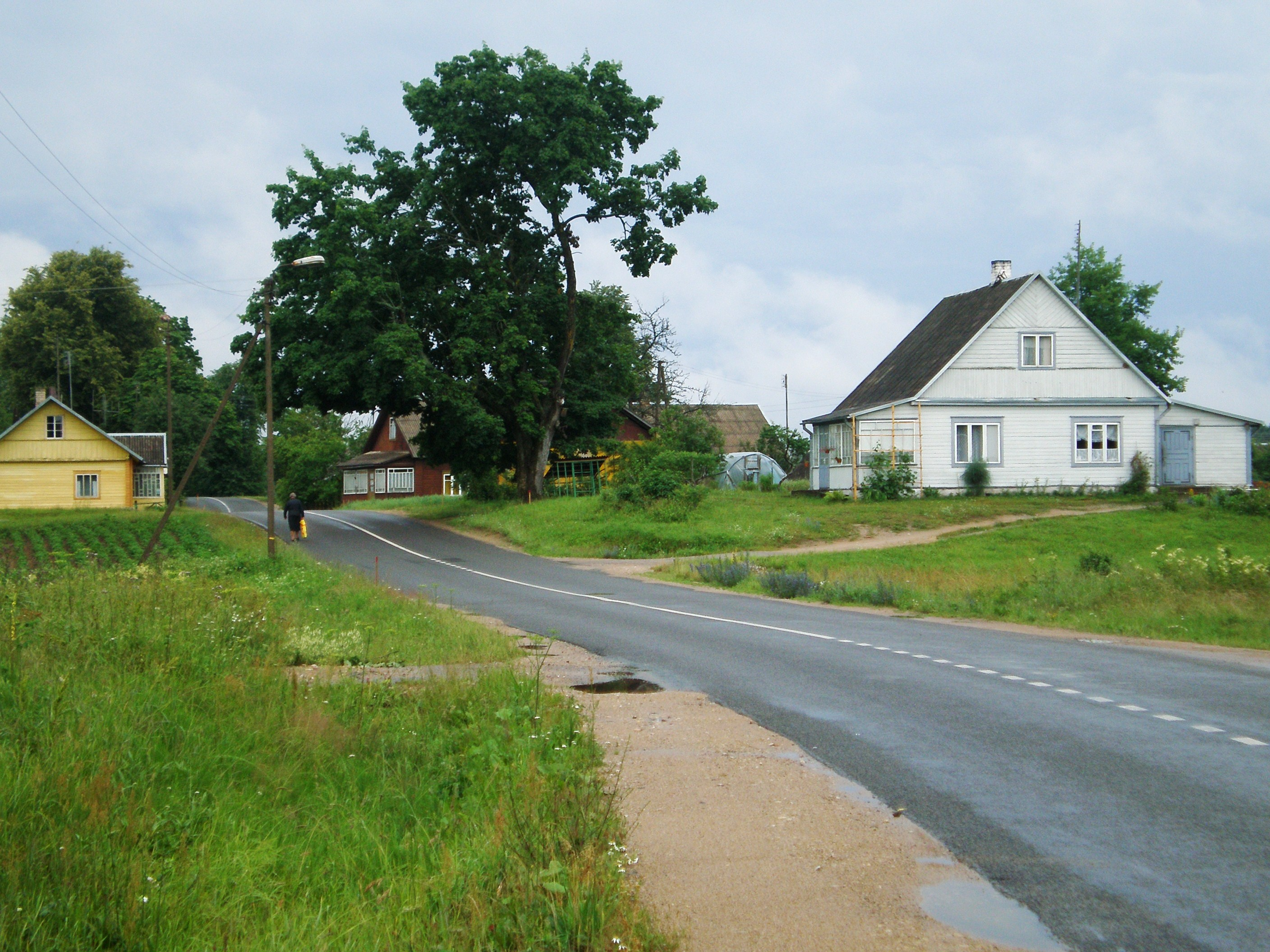

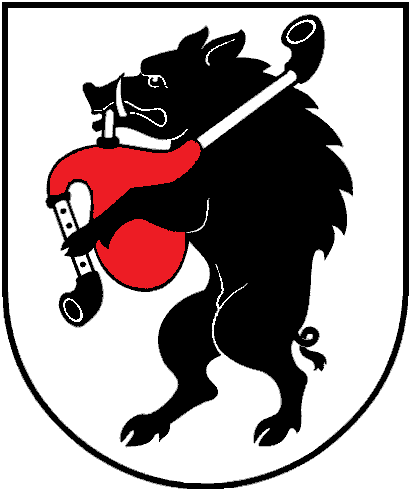
- Coat of arms

- Location in Lithuania
- Coordinates: 55°16′00″N 25°46′20″E
- Country: Lithuania
- County: Vilnius County
- Municipality: Švenčionys district municipality
- Eldership: Labanoras eldership
- Capital of: Labanoras eldership
- First mentioned: 1373

Population (2021)
  - Total: 43
- Time zone: UTC+2 (EET)
  - Summer (DST): UTC+3 (EEST)

Labanoras ([ɫaba'noːras]), is a small town within the Labanoras Regional Park in Lithuania. It is situated on Labanoras Lake and is surrounded by the Labanoras Regional Park, the largest regional park in Lithuania. As a center of the Labanoras Park, the town attracts tourists. A hotel and restaurant were opened in a former school building in 2003. According to the Lithuanian census of 2011, the town had 59 residents.

== History ==
In other languages, Labanoras is referred to as: Labanary, Labanoro, Polish: Łabonary, and Labanore (Yiddish).

The settlement is known from 1373. In 1386, Grand Duke Jogaila gifted Labanoras and other settlements to the newly established Diocese of Vilnius. In 1965, a hoard of about 470 coins was found near the town cemetery. It contained Prague groschen minted by Charles IV (1316–1378) and Wenceslaus (1361–1419) as well as early coins from the Grand Duchy of Lithuania by Vytautas (1350–1430) and Casimir IV Jagiellon (1427–1492). It is believed that the treasure was buried during the 1470s. The first church was mentioned in 1522, folwark in 1539, manor in 1568, parish school in 1781. The town had 196 residents in 1866, 443 in 1923, 264 in 1959, and 186 in 1979.

During World War II, in the summer of 1941, Einsatzgruppen and their local Hiwis executed 6 Jews and 1 Lithuanian. In 1991, the mass grave was surrounded by a chain and a plaque was installed with the following inscription in Yiddish and Lithuanian: “In memory of the Jews of Inturkė who were murdered by Hitler‘s executioners and their local helpers”.

== Labanoras Church ==
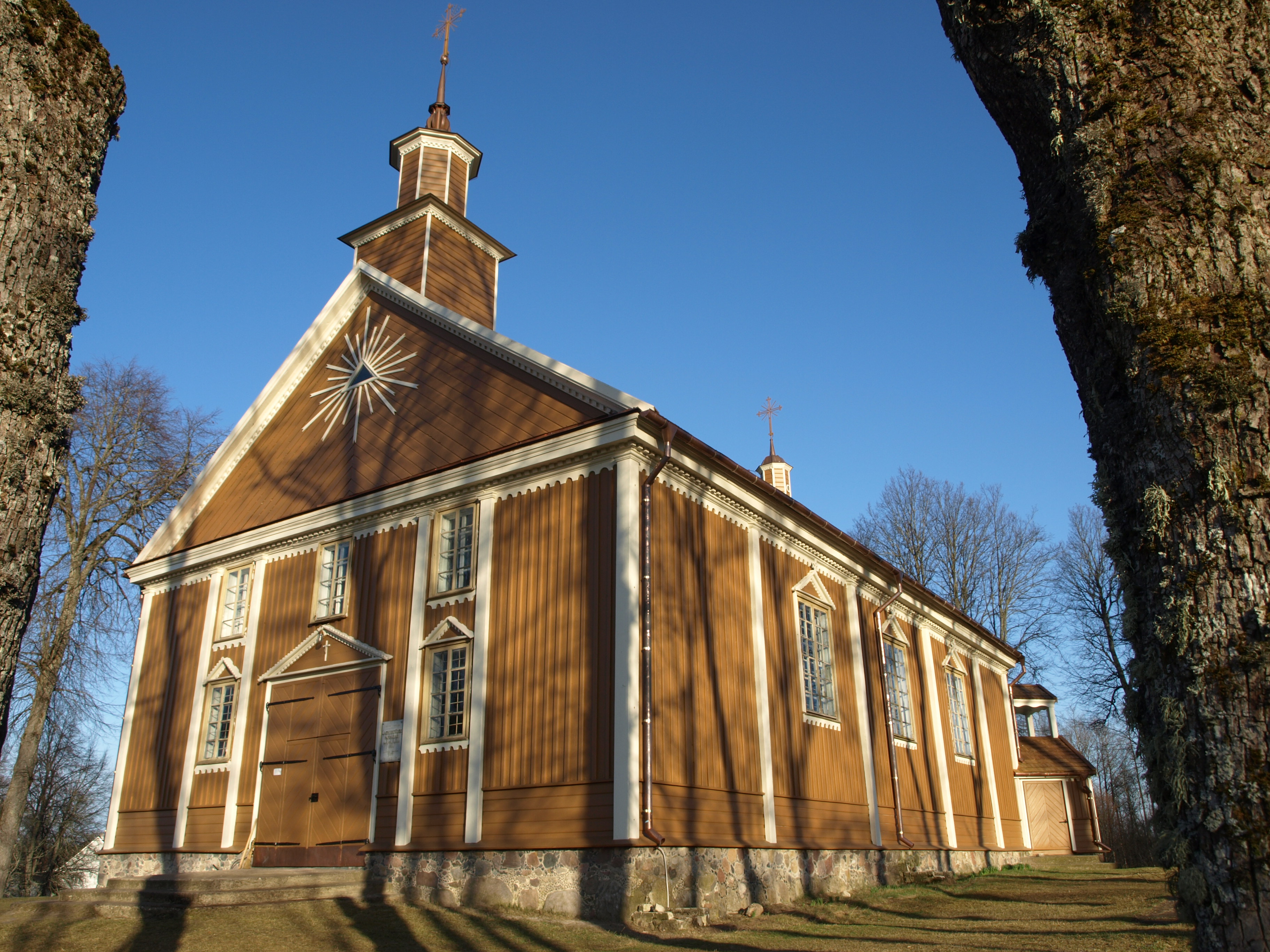
Labanoras Church

A miraculous painting of Mother of God was first mentioned during a canonical visitation in 1655. A wooden Church of the Nativity of the Blessed Virgin Mary was built in 1820, but it burned down in December 2009. As of January 2011, no official report had been released. Unofficially, the possibility of an accidental fire due to faulty electrical installation was ruled out, leaving arson as the most likely cause. It is believed that the church was robbed of its over 30 valuable paintings (15 of them were state-protected monuments of art) and then burned to cover up the crime. During the cleanup, 1,017 coins (German pfennigs, Russian kopeks, Lithuanian centas) were found under the burned altar. A reconstruction is underway, financed by the government and private donations.
