= Kunigiškė =

- Village
- Location of Kunigiškė
- Coordinates: 55°05′33″N 26°06′58″E
- Country: Lithuania
- County: Vilnius County
- Municipality: Švenčionys District Municipality
- Time zone: UTC+2 (EET)
  - Summer (DST): UTC+3 (EEST)

Kunigiškė is a village in the Švenčionys District Municipality. The village is located directly south of the city of Švenčionys.
