= Naujas Strūnaitis =

- Village
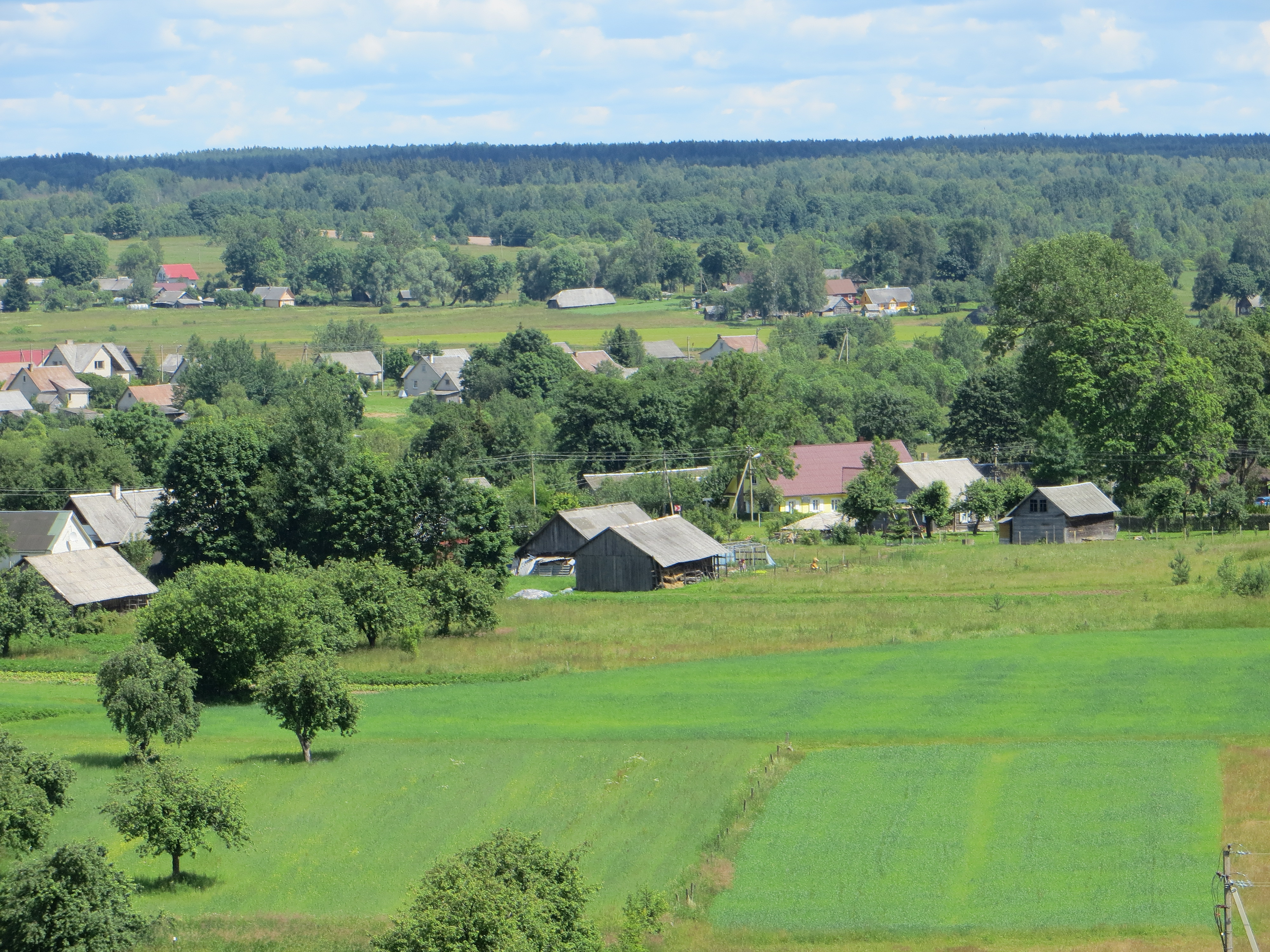
- Naujas Strūnaitis

- Location of Naujas Strūnaitis
- Coordinates: 55°04′25″N 26°07′59″E
- Country: Lithuania
- County: Vilnius County
- Municipality: Švenčionys District Municipality

Population (2021)
  - Total: 211
- Time zone: UTC+2 (EET)
  - Summer (DST): UTC+3 (EEST)

Naujas Strūnaitis is a village in the Švenčionys District Municipality. The village is located directly south of the city of Švenčionys.
