= Adutiškis Eldership =

Adutiškis Eldership Adutiškio seniūnija
- Eldership
- Interactive map of Adutiškis Eldership
- Coordinates: 55°12′22″N 26°37′23″E
- Country: Lithuania
- County: Vilnius
- Municipality: Švenčionys District
- Administrative centre: Adutiškis

Area
  - Total: 125 km^{2} (48 sq mi)

Population
  - Total: 795

The Adutiškis Eldership (Lithuanian: Adutiškio seniūnija) is an eldership of Lithuania, located in the Švenčionys District Municipality. In 2021 its population was 795.
