= Sužionys =

- Village
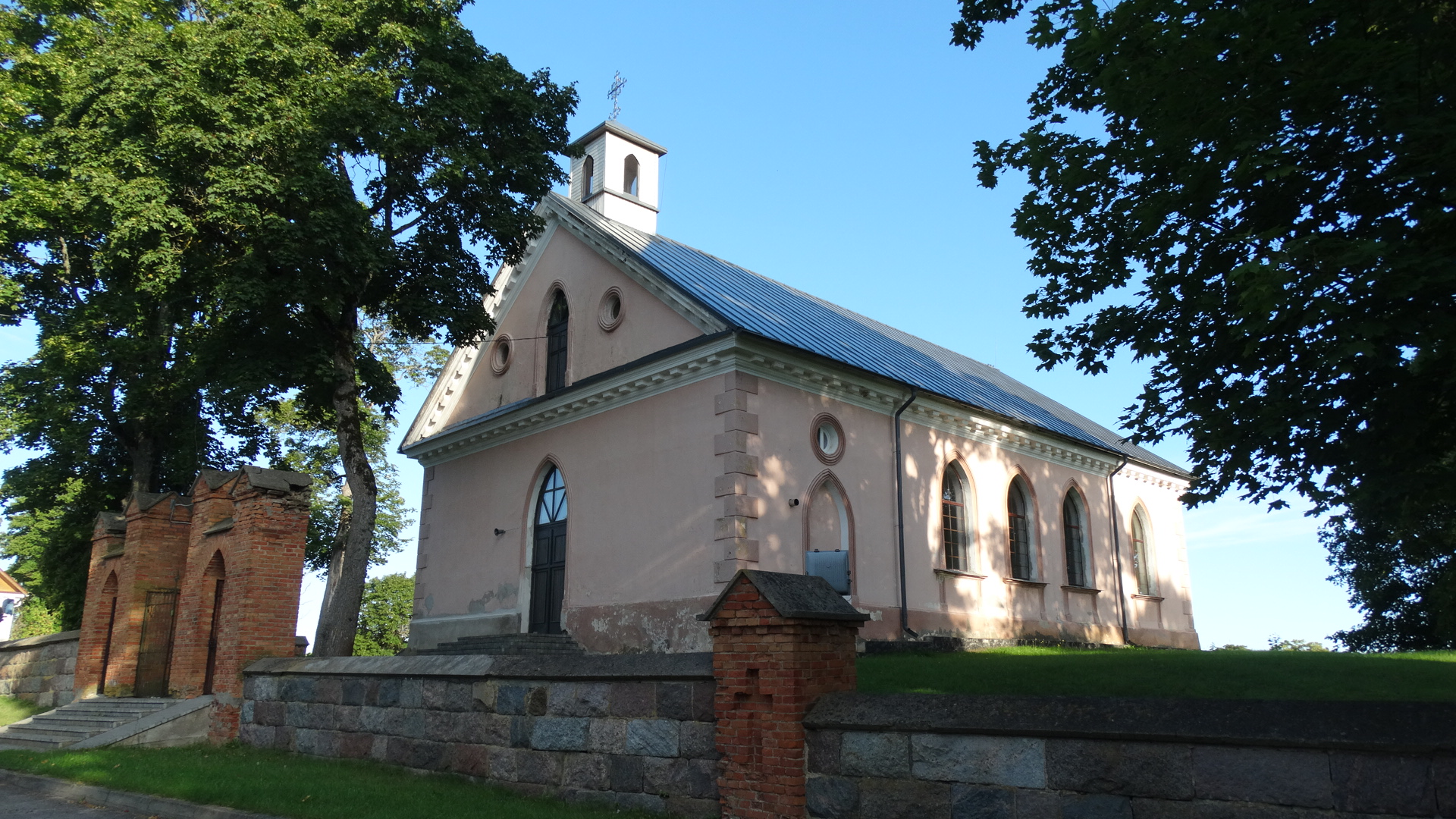
- Church of Sužionys

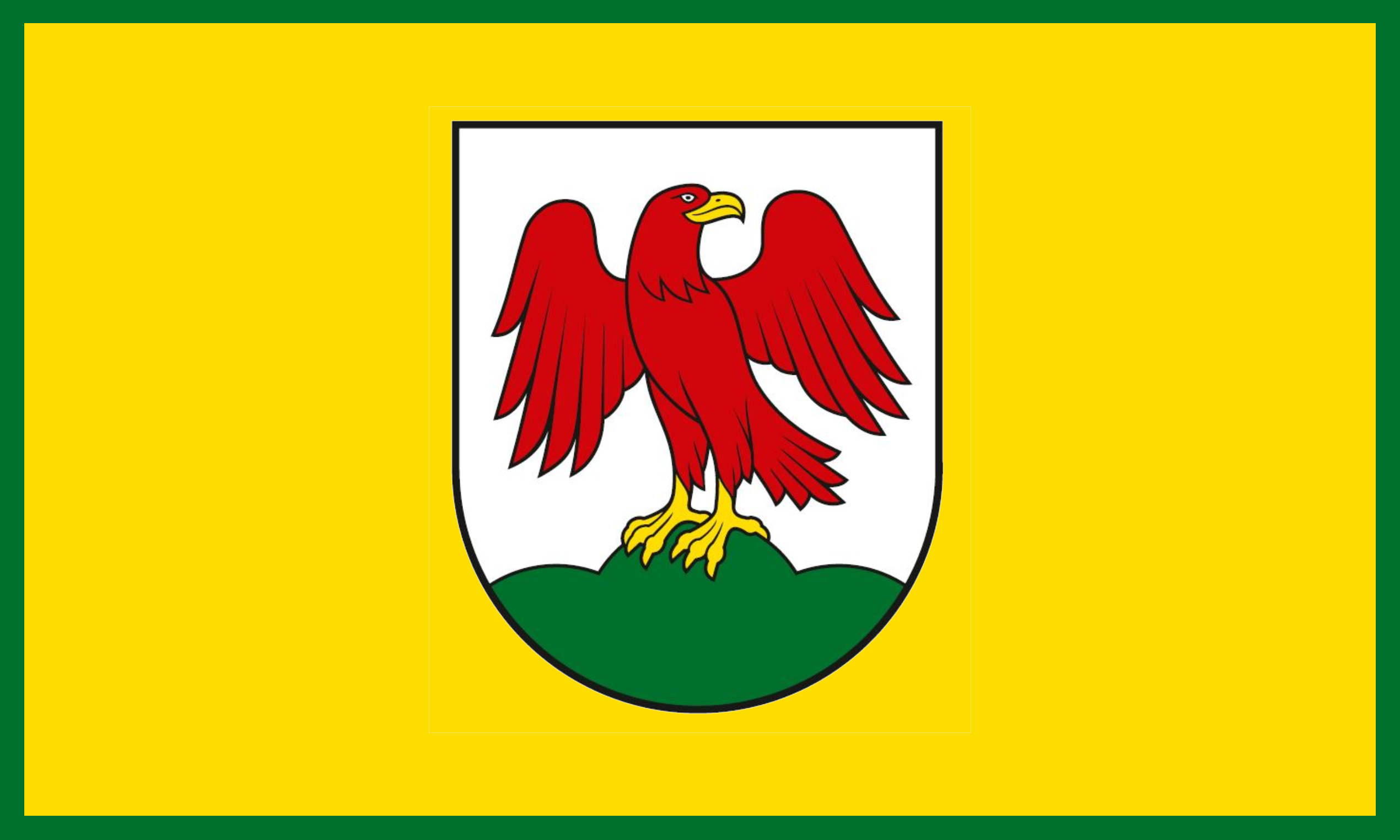
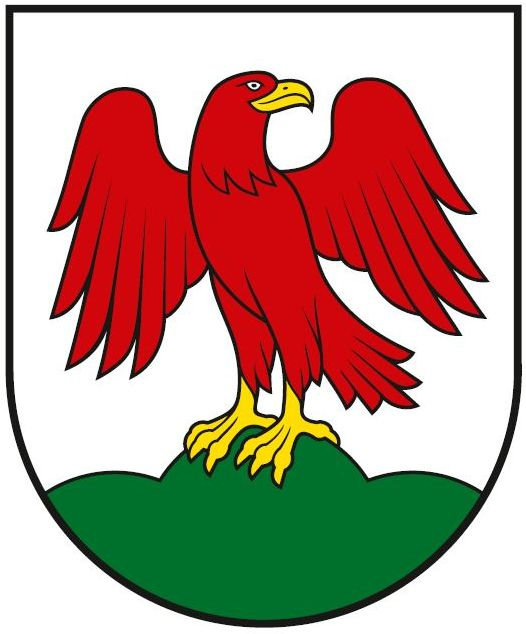
- Flag Coat of arms

- Location of Sužionys
- Coordinates: 54°59′25″N 25°30′27″E
- Country: Lithuania
- County: Vilnius County
- Municipality: Vilnius District Municipality
- Eldership: Sužionys Eldership
- Capital of: Sužionys Eldership

Population (2021)
  - Total: 397
- Time zone: UTC+2 (EET)
  - Summer (DST): UTC+3 (EEST)

Sužionys is a village in Vilnius District Municipality, Lithuania, it is located only about 23 kilometres (14 mi) north of Vilnius city municipality. According to the 2021 census, it had population of 397, a decrease from 449 in 2011, and 608 in 1987.

== History ==
Environs of Sužionys were inhabited from the 1st millennium BC. Sužionys Hillfort with archaeological remains of an ancient settlement is situated near the village. Sužionys itself was mentioned for the first times in written sources in 1554. A modest neoclassical church, that is now standing, was built in 1795.
