= Paberžė Eldership =

Paberžė Eldership Paberžės seniūnija
- Eldership
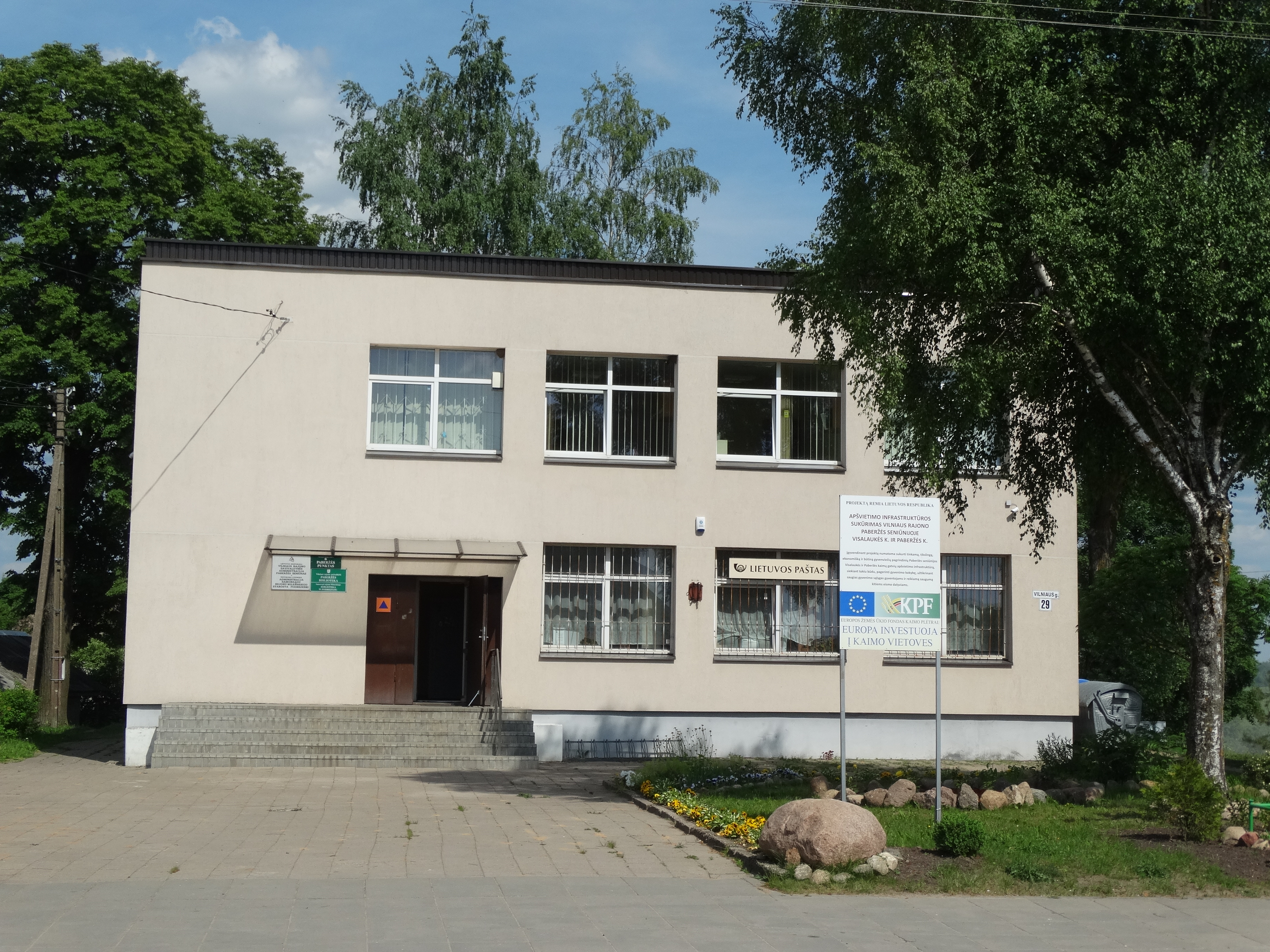
- Administration building

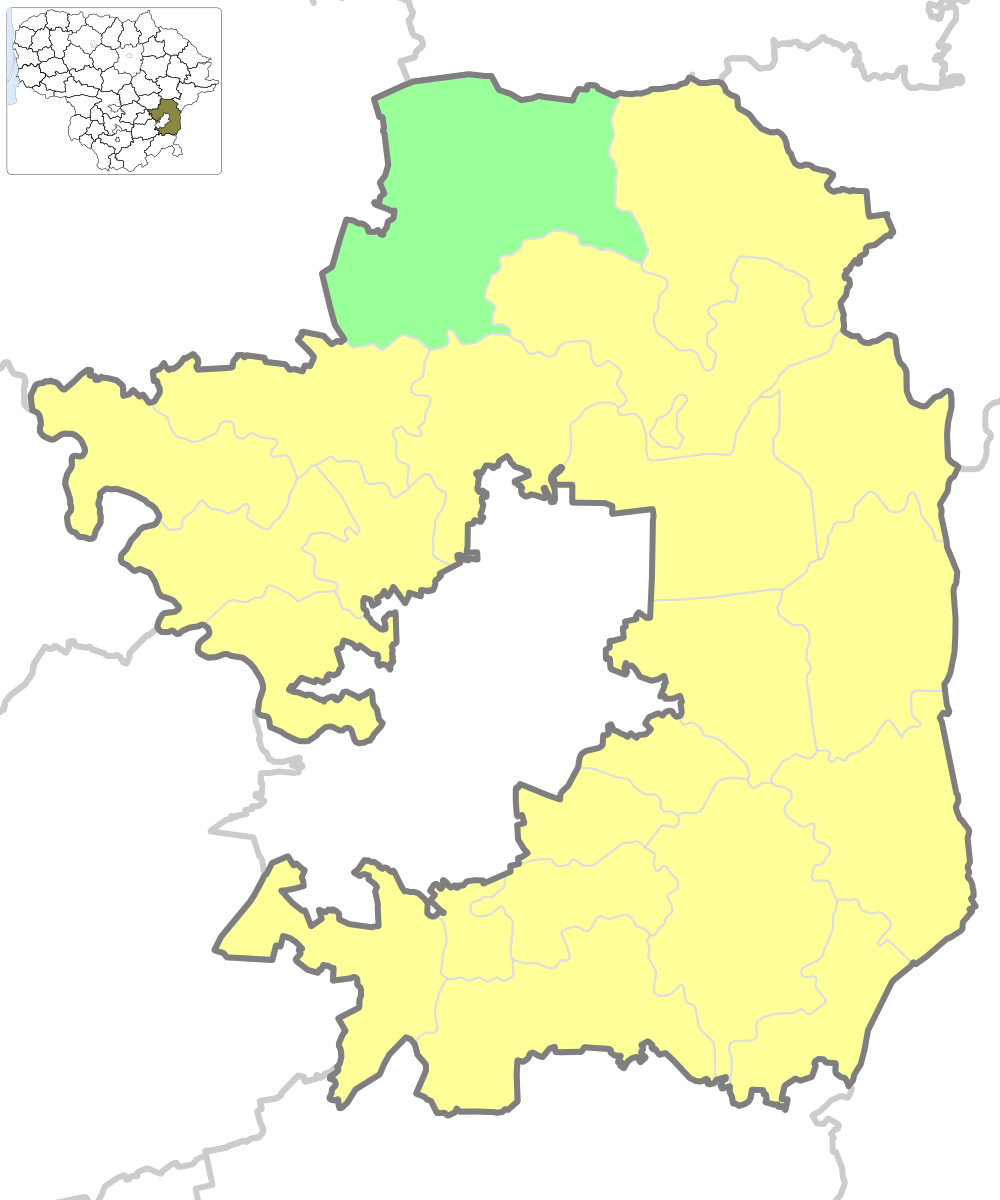
- Location of Zujūnai Eldership
- Country: Lithuania
- Ethnographic region: Aukštaitija
- County: Vilnius County
- Municipality: Vilnius District Municipality
- Administrative centre: Paberžė

Area
  - Total: 209 km^{2} (81 sq mi)

Population
  - Total: 3,175
  - Density: 15.2/km^{2} (39.3/sq mi)
- Time zone: UTC+2 (EET)
  - Summer (DST): UTC+3 (EEST)
- Website: https://www.vrsa.lt

Paberžė Eldership (Lithuanian: Paberžės seniūnija) is an eldership in Lithuania, located in Vilnius District Municipality, northwest of Vilnius.

== Ethnic composition ==
According to 2011 National Census data, the ethnic composition is as follows:

- Poles - 60%
- Lithuanians - 20%
- Russians - 13%
