= Adutiškis =

- Town
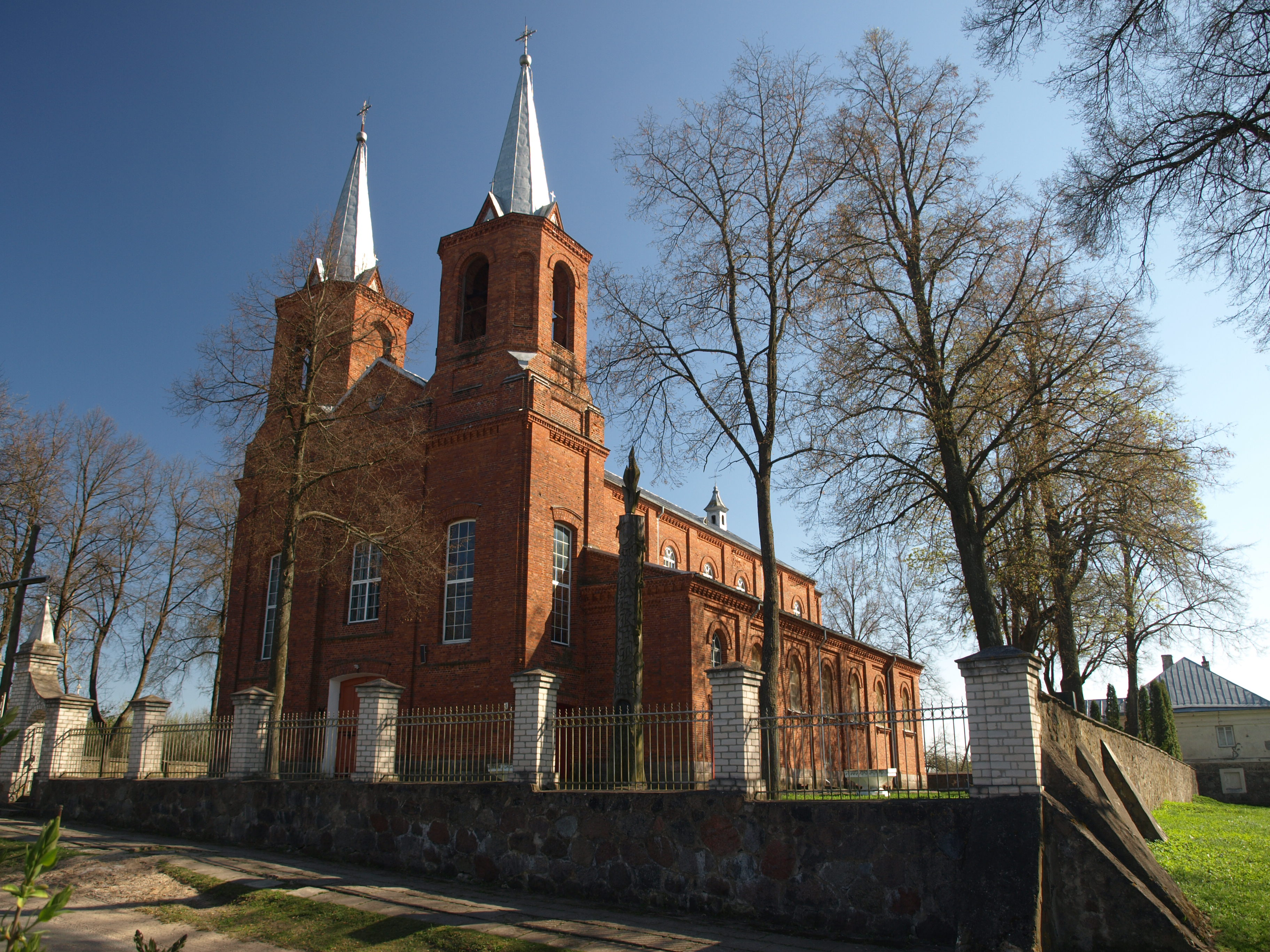
- Church in Adutiškis

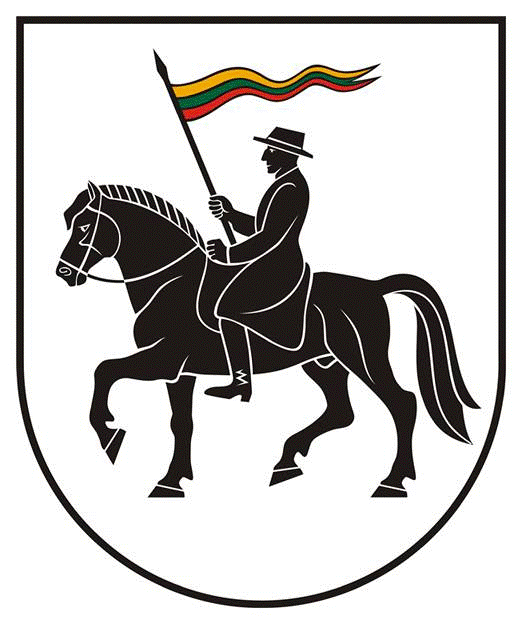
- Coat of arms

- Location of Adutiškis
- Coordinates: 55°09′20″N 26°35′10″E
- Country: Lithuania
- Ethnographic region: Aukštaitija
- County: Vilnius County
- Municipality: Švenčionys district municipality
- Eldership: Adutiškis eldership

Population (2021)
  - Total: 558
- Time zone: UTC+2 (EET)
  - Summer (DST): UTC+3 (EEST)

Adutiškis (Lithuanian pronunciation: [adʊˈtʲɪʃkɪs]; Polish: Hoduciszki; Belarusian: Гадуцішкі) is a town in Švenčionys district municipality, in Vilnius County, in northeast Lithuania. According to the 2011 census, the town has a population of 689 people. The town is located near the Kamaja river, and at the border with Belarus. There are the Church of St. Virgin Mary Scapular, built in 1913, Adutiškis Secondary School, customs office, post office, and a retirement home in Adutiškis.

== History ==
=== Early history ===
The first documented mention of Adutiškis is from the 14th century. From 1526 onwards, ownership of the town passed to Jerzy Radziwiłł (Jurgis Radvila). It subsequently became the possession of the Kiszka family (Kiška). In 1526, the town, which developed adjacent to the manor estate, was granted the privilege of holding markets and operating a tavern. In 1608, the town was bestowed upon the Roman Catholic Archdiocese of Vilnius.

A Catholic church was constructed in the 16th century. In 1790, a parish school and an orphanage were established. In 1795, after the Third Partition of Polish-Lithuanian Commonwealth the area was subjected to incursions by Russian forces, and in 1811-1812 during the French invasion of Russia, it was raided by the French army. As a consequence of the 1863 Uprising, numerous families who had supported the rebels were deported to Siberia by Russian authorities.

The construction of a railway line connecting Pabradė and Polotsk in 1895 led to a period of rapid expansion for the town, which subsequently gained recognition as a centre for commercial activity.

=== 20th century ===
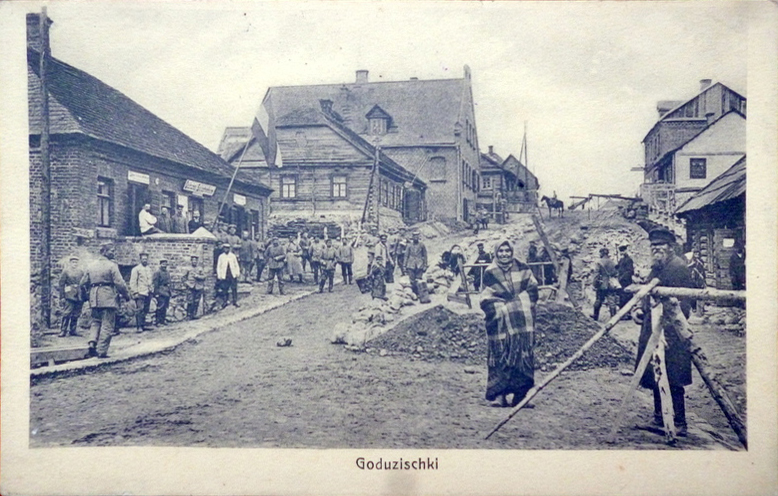
Adutiškis in 1916

The Vilnius region, including Adutiškis, was annexed by Poland from 1920 to 1939. During this period, it served as one of the primary centres for Lithuanian activities, with the establishment of a Lithuanian school and library, as well as branches of the Lithuanian St. Casimir's and Rytas societies. The promotion of Lithuanianism was largely spearheaded by Lithuanian priests, notably Aleksandras Burba and B. Krištaponis. Polish repressions against local Lithuanians in Adutiškis started in 1926 following the closure of Lithuanian schools in the district. Lithuanian children were forced to attend Polish schools. Failure to attend school on 16 February (Lithuanian Independence Day and a public holiday) resulted in disciplinary action being taken against the parents and students.

In the autumn of 1939, the Soviets crossed into the Vilnius region and Adutiškis. Many men were drafted into the Red Army, later Lithuanians were discharged from the army, but the local Belarusians were not. Soon the war reached Adutiškis. On 19 September 1939, the Red Army captured Vilnius, which it returned to Lithuania. The residents of Adutiškis anticipated the arrival of the Lithuanian army. However, they did not arrive, and the inhabitants soon learned that they were incorporated into Byelorussian SSR. The border between Lithuania and the USSR was located between Švenčionys and Švenčionėliai. Many young people fled to Lithuania. In Adutiškis, numerous Soviet troops were deployed. On 25 March 1940, the occupying Soviet government organised elections. However, few people voted, and those who did often destroyed their ballots. Soon Soviets deported 26 families from Adutiškis to Siberia. The deportations involved the removal of Lithuanians, Jews and Poles from their homes. Polish soldiers who were captured in Adutiškis by the Soviets were taken to the Arkhangelsk region. Those who survived joined General Władysław Anders, and fought on the 2nd Polish Corps. At the end of the war, some of the men returned to Adutiškis and other towns where, on Stalin's orders, they were deported again.

For some time, the town was a No man's land, with only about 20 inhabitants remaining. In June 1941, Nazi Germany occupied Lithuania. In September 1941, the Jewish population of Adutiškis and Stajėtiškis were executed at the Švenčionėliai military training ground by an Einsatzgruppen of Adutiškis policemen. On the preceding day, the Jews were rounded up in the local synagogue. Additionally, non-Jewish residents of Adutiškis who possessed horses were also rounded up at the synagogue as they were forced to assist with the transportation of the Jews. In 1938, the town had a population of 2,000, of whom 700 were Jewish. Some Jews managed to hide in people's homes throughout the German occupation. The Germans threatened the inhabitants with the death penalty for hiding Jews.

In 1944, the Germans destroyed the mill and the bridge during their retreat. The Soviets set fire to the town when they arrived and the Soviet re-occupation began. In autumn, a Lithuanian partisan of "Tigras" detachment was formed in the area. After the war, the Soviets deported another 172 people from Adutiškis and its surroundings. In 1949, the inhabitants were forced to join collective farms.

== Demographics ==
The 1942 census records that 68.9% of the population of Adutiškis parish were Lithuanian, 29.1% Belarusian and 1.7% Polish.
