= Sariai Eldership =

Eldership of Lithuania

The Sariai Eldership (Lithuanian: Sarių seniūnija) is an eldership of Lithuania, located in the Švenčionys District Municipality. In 2021 its population was 359.
