= Cirkliškis Eldership =

Eldership of Lithuania

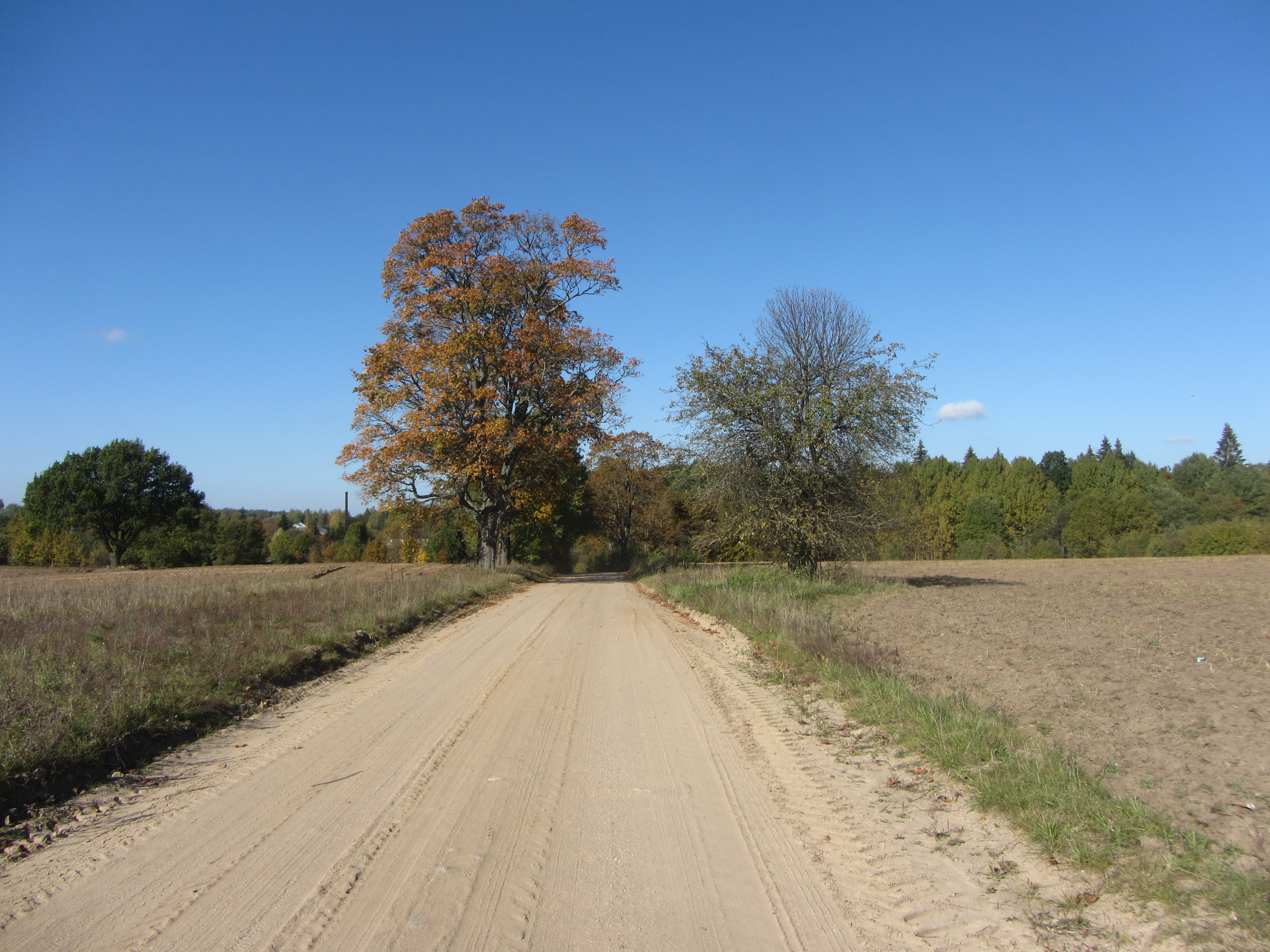
Cirkliškis, Lithuania

The Cirkliškis Eldership (Lithuanian: Cirkliškio seniūnija) is an eldership of Lithuania, located in the Švenčionys District Municipality. In 2021 its population was 755.
