= Strūnaitis Eldership =

Eldership of Lithuania

The Strūnaitis Eldership (Lithuanian: Strūnaičio seniūnija) is an eldership of Lithuania, located in the Švenčionys District Municipality. In 2021 its population was 1002.
