= Magūnai Eldership =

Eldership of Lithuania

The Magūnai Eldership (Lithuanian: Magūnų seniūnija) is an eldership of Lithuania, located in the Švenčionys District Municipality. In 2021 its population was 603.
