= Svirkos Eldership =

Eldership of Lithuania

The Svirkos Eldership (Lithuanian: Svirkų seniūnija) is an eldership of Lithuania, located in the Švenčionys District Municipality. In 2021 its population was 707.
