= Labanoras Eldership =

Eldership of Lithuania

The Labanoras Eldership (Lithuanian: Labanoro seniūnija) is an eldership of Lithuania, located in the Švenčionys District Municipality. In 2021 its population was 290.
