= Kaltanėnai Eldership =

Eldership of Lithuania

The Kaltanėnai Eldership (Lithuanian: Kaltanėnų seniūnija) is an eldership of Lithuania, located in the Švenčionys District Municipality. In 2021 its population was 349.
