= Švenčionys District Municipality =

Švenčionys District Municipality Švenčionių rajono savivaldybė
- Municipality
- Flag Coat of arms

- Location of Švenčionys District Municipality

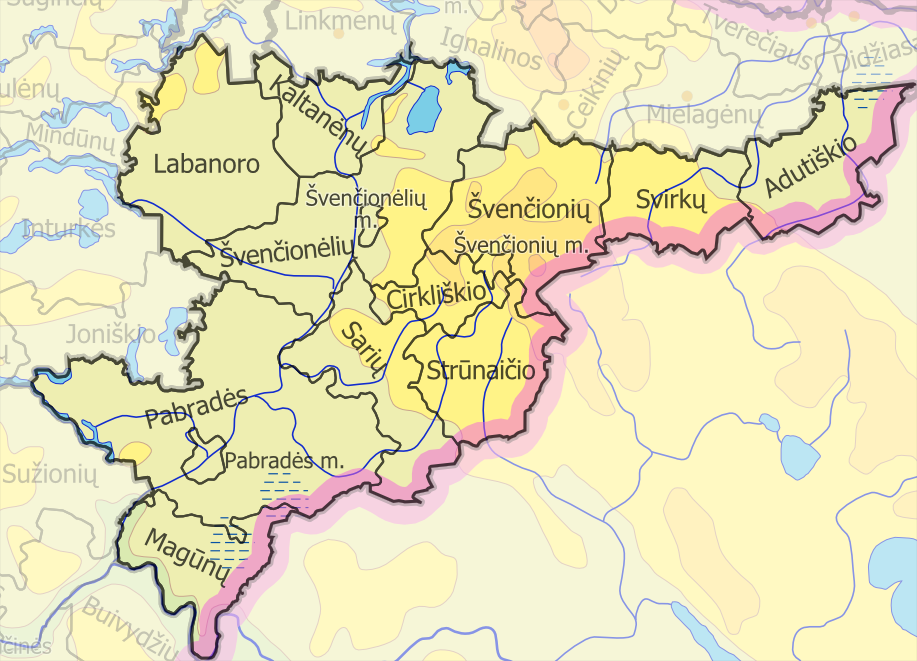
- Map of Švenčionys district municipality
- Country: Lithuania
- Ethnographic region: Dzūkija/Aukštaitija
- County: Vilnius County
- Capital: Švenčionys
- Elderships: List: Adutiškis; Cirkliškis; Kaltanėnai; Labanoras; Magūnai; Pabradė (rural); Pabradė (city); Sariai; Naujas Strūnaitis; Svirkos; Švenčionėliai (rural); Švenčionėliai (city); Švenčionys (rural); Švenčionys (city)

Area
  - Total: 1,692 km^{2} (653 sq mi)

Population (2021)
  - Total: 22,966
  - Density: 13.57/km^{2} (35.15/sq mi)
- Time zone: UTC+2 (EET)
  - Summer (DST): UTC+3 (EEST)
- Major settlements: Pabradė (pop. 4,807); Švenčionėliai (pop. 4,683); Švenčionys (pop. 4,346)
- Website: www.svencionys.lt

Švenčionys District Municipality is one of 60 municipalities in Lithuania.

It has significant Polish minority population in Lithuania, with a quarter of the population claiming Polish ethnicity.

== Elderships ==
Švenčionys District Municipality is divided into 11 elderships:

Eldership	Area	Population (2021 Census)	Population density (per km^{2})
Adutiškis	125 km^{2} (30,888.17 acres; 48.26 sq mi)	795	6
Cirkliškis	47 km^{2} (11,613.95 acres; 18.15 sq mi)	755	16
Kaltanėnai	68 km^{2} (16,803.17 acres; 26.25 sq mi)	349	5
Labanoras	290 km^{2} (71,660.56 acres; 111.97 sq mi)	205	1
Magūnai	101 km^{2} (24,957.64 acres; 39.00 sq mi)	603	6
Pabradė	365 km^{2} (90,193.46 acres; 140.93 sq mi)	6,257	17
Sariai	144 km^{2} (35,583.17 acres; 55.60 sq mi)	359	3
Strūnaitis	106 km^{2} (26,193.17 acres; 40.93 sq mi)	1,002	10
Svirkos	101 km^{2} (24,957.64 acres; 39.00 sq mi)	707	7
Švenčionėliai	239 km^{2} (59,058.19 acres; 92.28 sq mi)	6,103	26
Švenčionys	164 km^{2} (40,525.28 acres; 63.32 sq mi)	5,831	36

== Demographics ==
Historical population

Year	Pop.	±%
1959	39,829	—
1979	38,157	−4.2%
1989	38,004	−0.4%

Year	Pop.	±%
2001	33,135	−12.8%
2011	27,868	−15.9%
2021	22,996	−17.5%

== International relations ==
=== Twin towns — Sister cities ===
Švenčionys district municipality is twinned with the following towns:

- Świdnica, Poland

== See also ==
- Švenčionys
- Vasiuliškė
