= Vilnius County =

County of Lithuania

Coordinates: 54°40′49″N 25°17′02″E

Vilnius County Vilniaus apskritis
- County
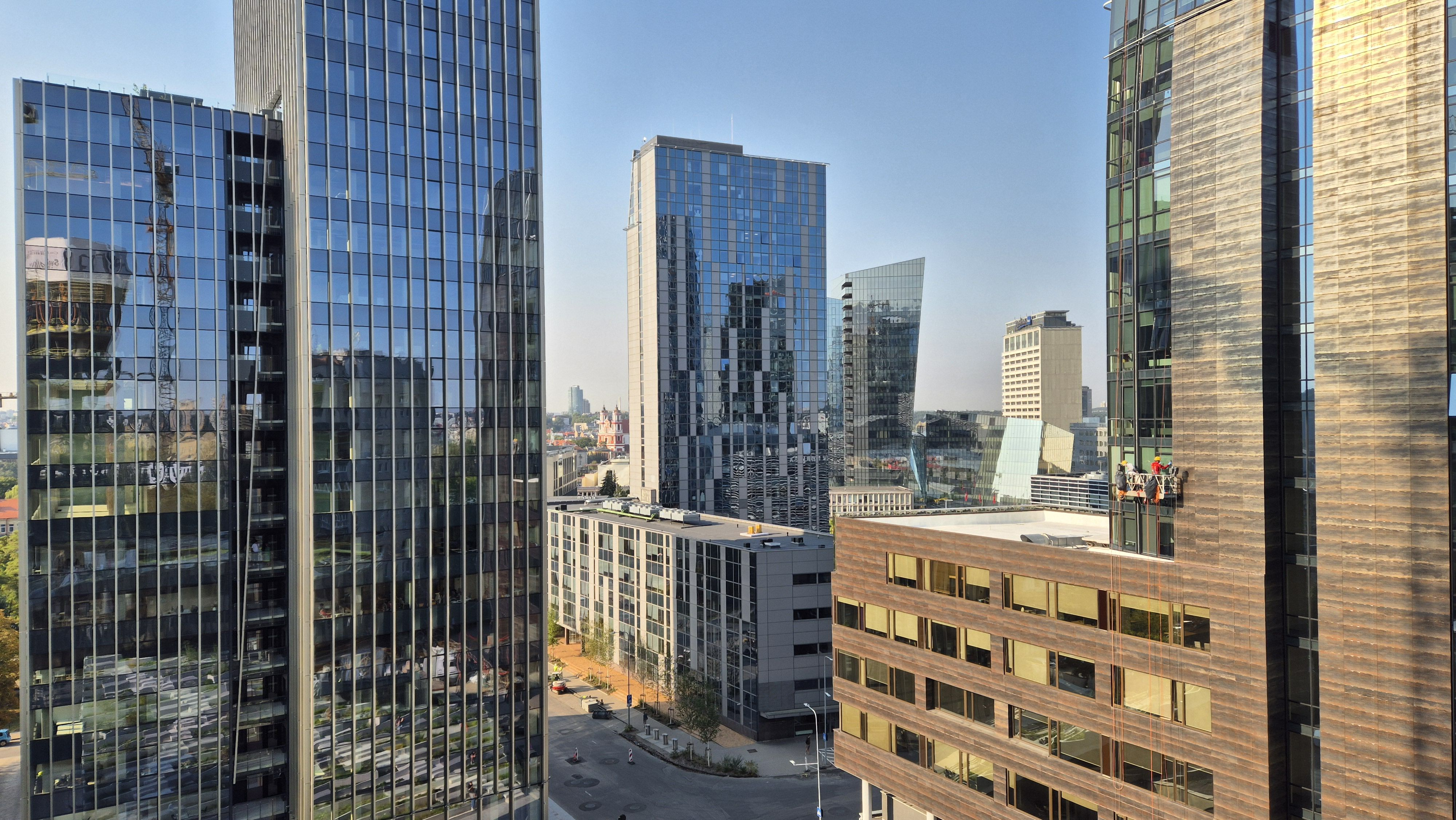
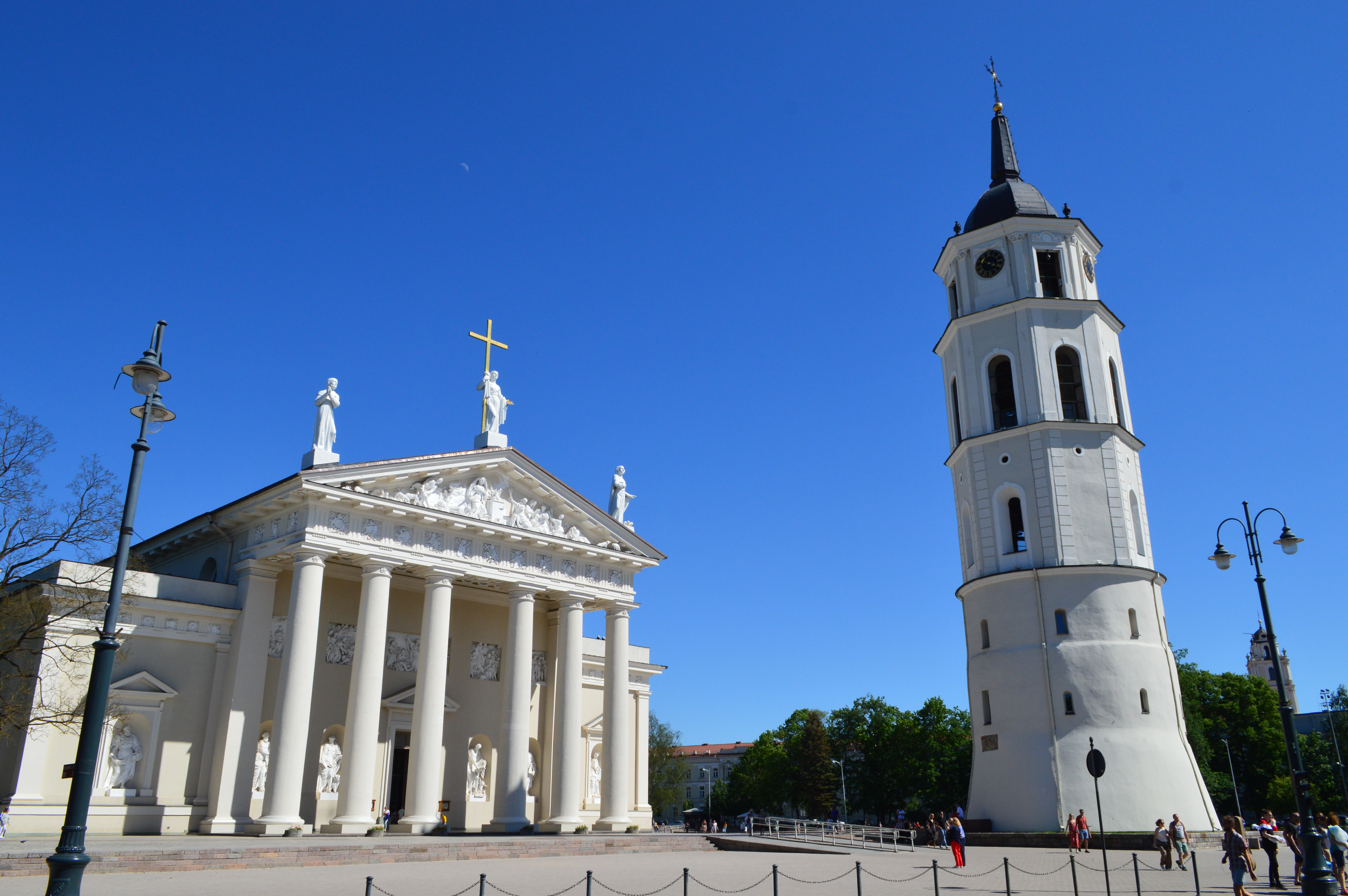
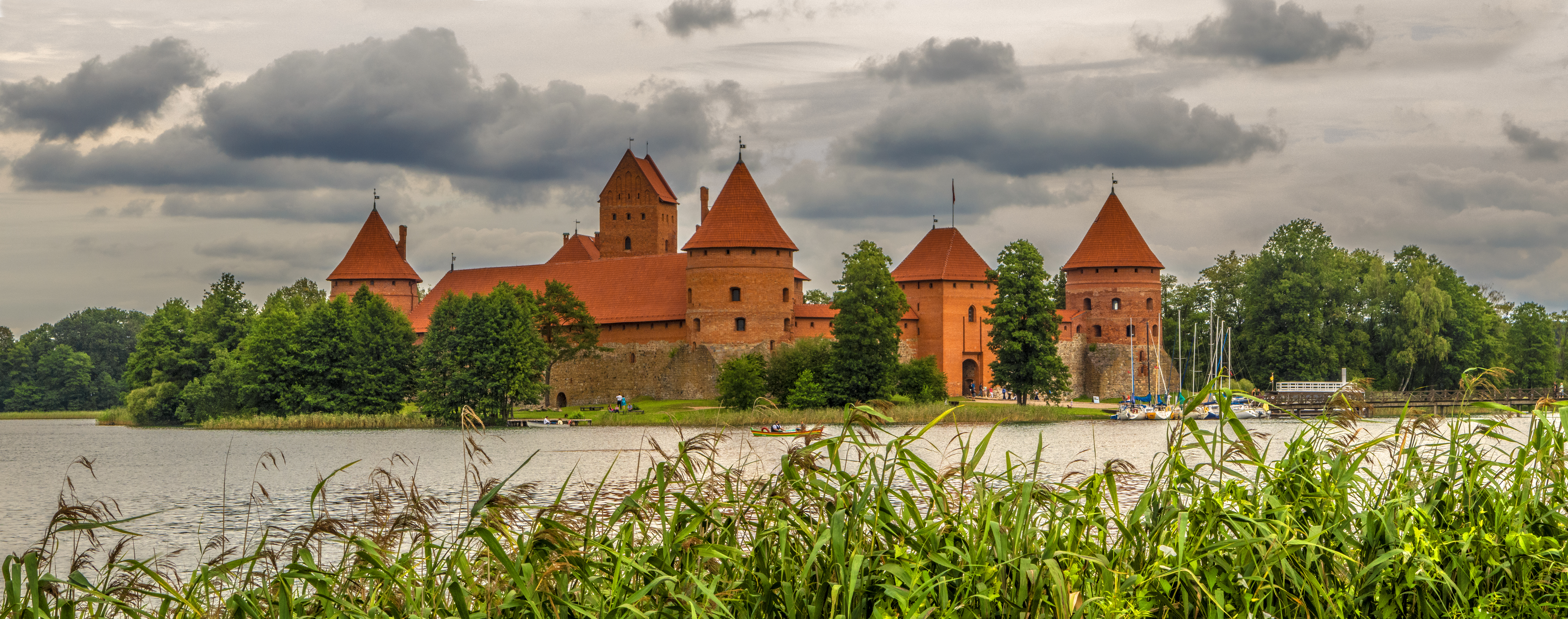
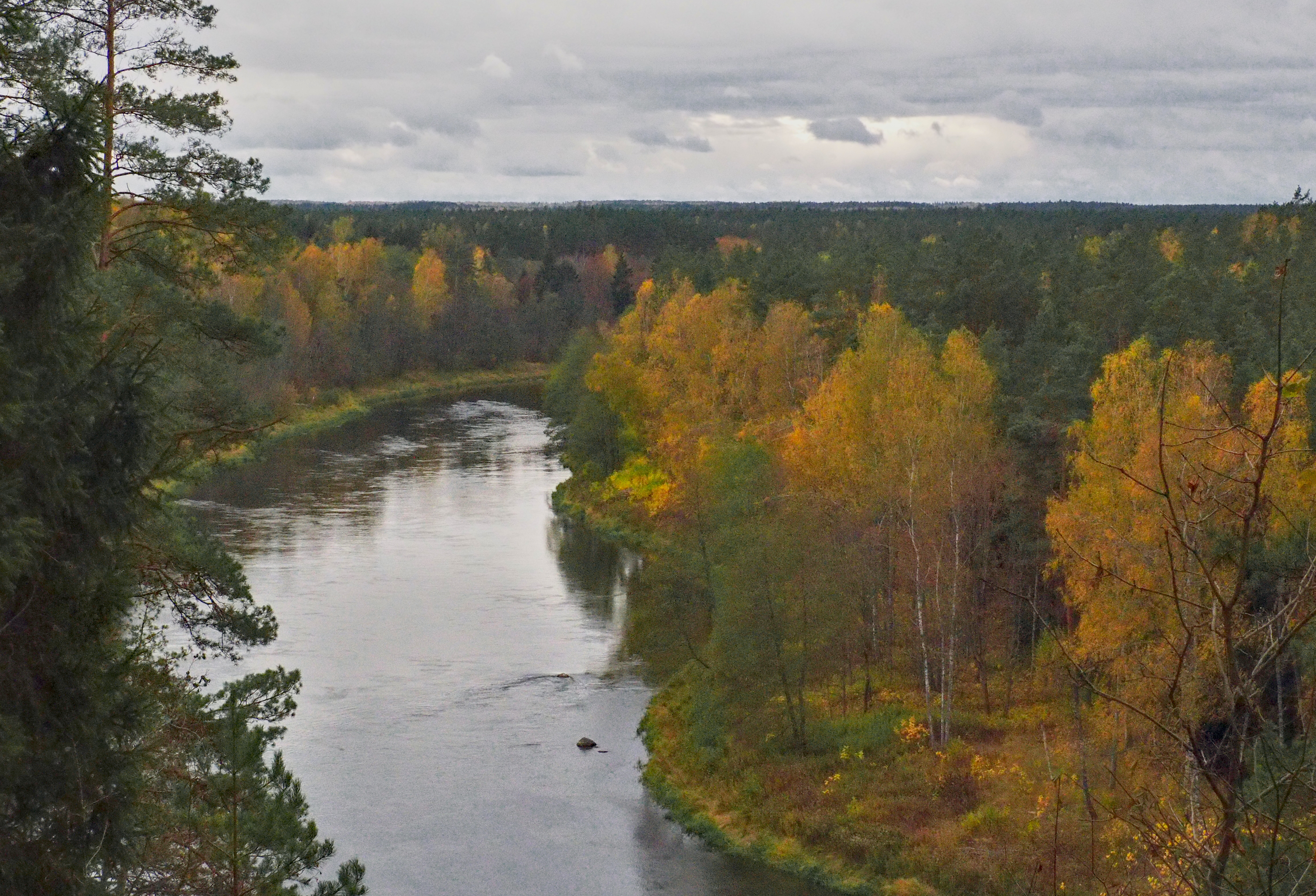
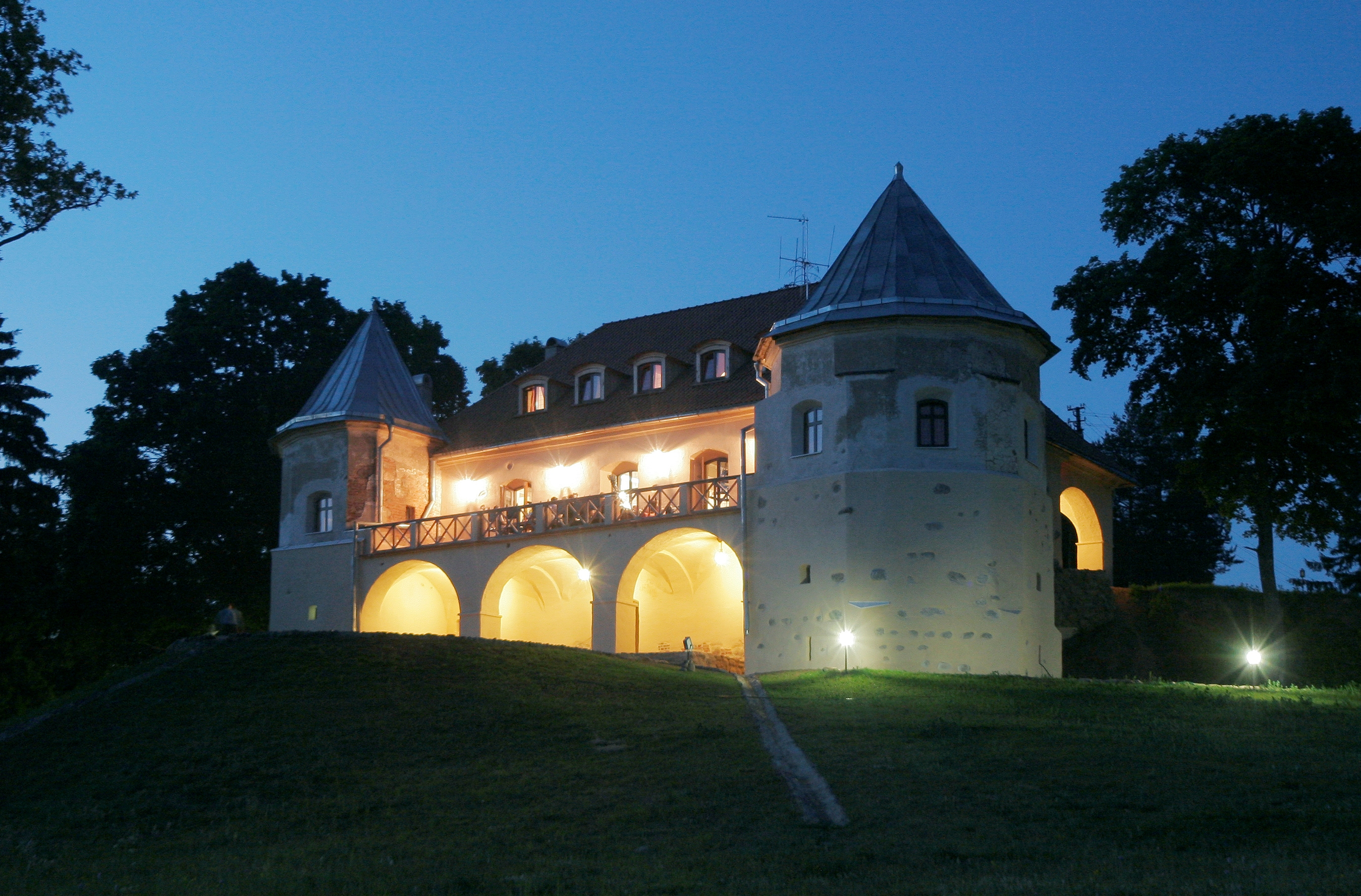
- From the top to bottom-right: Vilnius Central Business District, Vilnius Cathedral, Trakai Island Castle, Neris Regional Park, Norviliškės Castle.

- Flag Coat of arms

- Location of Vilnius County
- Country: Lithuania
- Administrative centre: Vilnius
- Municipalities: List: Elektrėnai municipality; Šalčininkai district municipality; Širvintos district municipality; Švenčionys district municipality; Trakai district municipality; Ukmergė district municipality; Vilnius city municipality; Vilnius district municipality

Area
  - Total: 9,730 km^{2} (3,760 sq mi)
- (14.9% of the area of Lithuania)

Population (2024)
  - Total: 872,685
  - Rank: 1st of 10 (30% of the population of Lithuania)
  - Density: 89.7/km^{2} (232/sq mi)

GDP
  - Total: €36.2 billion (2024)
  - Per capita: €41,500 (2024)
- Time zone: UTC+2 (EET)
  - Summer (DST): UTC+3 (EEST)
- ISO 3166 code: LT-VL
- HDI (2023): 0.934 – very high · 1st

Vilnius County (Lithuanian: Vilniaus apskritis) is the largest of the 10 counties of Lithuania, located in the east of the country around the city Vilnius and is also known as Capital Region or Sostinės regionas by the Lithuanian statistics department and Eurostat. On 1 July 2010, the county administration was abolished, and since that date, Vilnius County remains as a territorial and statistical unit.

== History ==
Historical population
Year	Pop.	±% p.a.
1989	905,694	—
2001	850,064	−0.53%
2011	810,403	−0.48%
2021	810,797	+0.00%
2024	868,341	+2.31%
2025	876,727	+0.97%
2026	888,712	+1.37%

Until the Partitions of the Polish–Lithuanian Commonwealth in late 18th century the area belonged to the Vilnius Voivodship and Trakai Voivodship of the Polish–Lithuanian Commonwealth. In the Russian Empire it belonged to the Northwestern Krai and approximately corresponded to its Vilna Governorate (as of 1843). During World War I, following the German offensive of 1915, it was occupied by the German army. After the war, some parts of the area was ruled by local Polish self-government established after the German Ober-Ost army withdrew from the area.

Following the start of the Polish-Bolshevik War in 1919, it was occupied by the Red Army, which was pushed back by the Polish Army. In 1920, it was again occupied by the Red Army, but the Soviets officially recognized the sovereignty of the Lithuanian Republic over the city immediately after defeat during Battle of Warsaw. During their retreat, the Bolsheviks passed the sovereignty over the area to Lithuania. The Polish commander Józef Piłsudski ordered his subordinate general Lucjan Żeligowski to "rebel" his Lithuanian-Belarusian division and capture the city of Vilnius, without declaring war on Lithuania. The area of the future Vilnius County was seized by the Polish forces without significant opposition from Lithuanian forces and Gen. Żeligowski created a short-lived state called the Republic of Central Lithuania. Following the elections held there in 1922 the state was incorporated into Poland (see Vilnius region, Central Lithuania).

As a result of the Nazi-Soviet Alliance and the Polish Defensive War of 1939, the area was captured by the Soviet Union, which transferred parts of what is now Vilnius County and Utena County to Lithuania, only to annex it the following year. In 1941, it was conquered by the Nazi Germany. During World War II, the area saw formation of many resistance units, most notably the Polish Home Army and, after 1943, Soviet partisans. After the war, Vilniaus Apskritis existed as a relic of the pre-war independent state in Lithuanian SSR between 1944 and 1950. In this period, a significant part of its population moved to Poland during the so-called repatriation.

After 1990, when Lithuania became independent, Vilnius county was re-established differently in 1994. This entity has different boundaries than any previous entity and is not directly related to previous entities in this area. The mission of the county is different as well: its primary goal (as in that of Lithuania's other counties) is to oversee that municipalities in its area follow the laws of Lithuania.

== Municipalities ==
The county is subdivided into six district municipalities, one municipality and one city municipality:

Elektrėnai Municipality
Šalčininkai District Municipality
Širvintos District Municipality
Švenčionys District Municipality
Trakai District Municipality
Ukmergė District Municipality
Vilnius City Municipality
Vilnius District Municipality

== Demographics ==
According to the 2021 census, the county population was 810,797 people, of which:

- Lithuanians – 63.07% (511,426)
- Poles – 21.08% (170,919)
- Russians – 8.65% (70,170)
- Belarusians – 2.59% (21,055)
- Ukrainians – 0.76% (6,170)
- Others / did not specify – 3.82% (31,048)

== Economy ==
In 2022, GDP per capita of Vilnius County was €35,300, making it the richest county in Lithuania and Baltic States.

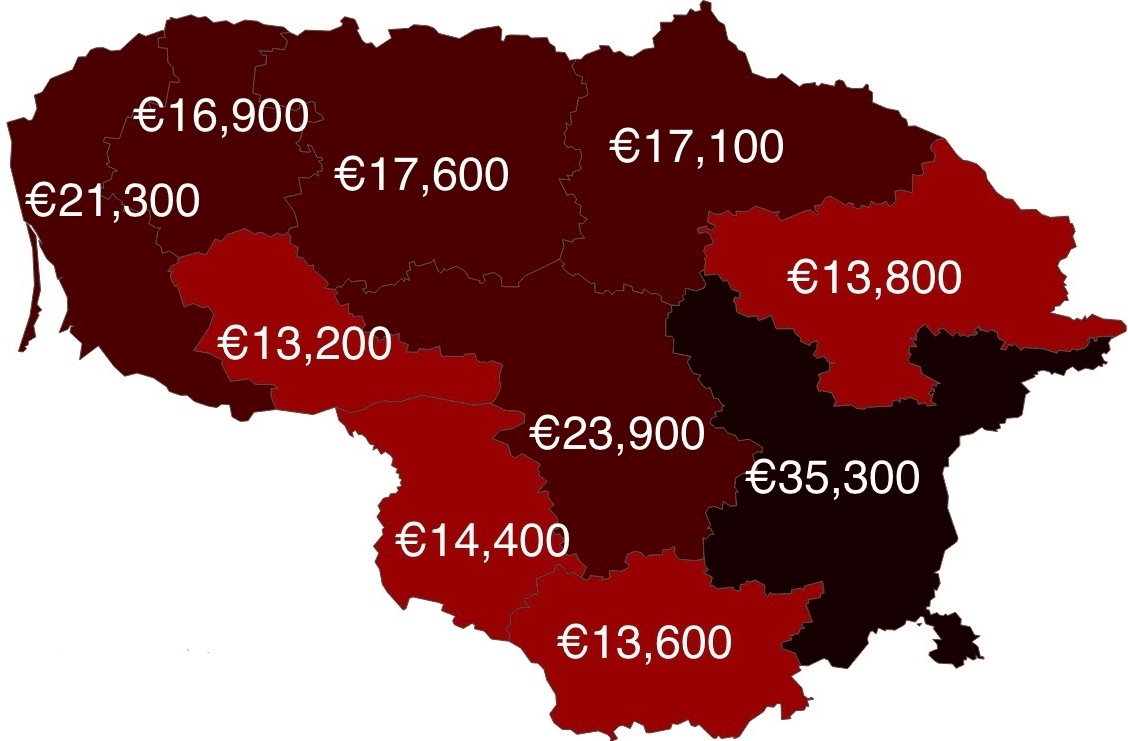
Lithuanian counties by GDP per capita, 2022

As of 2022, the average monthly gross wage in Vilnius County reached €2,002.
