= Aluona Hydrographical Sanctuary =

Protected area in Lithuania

- IUCN category VI (protected area with sustainable use of natural resources)
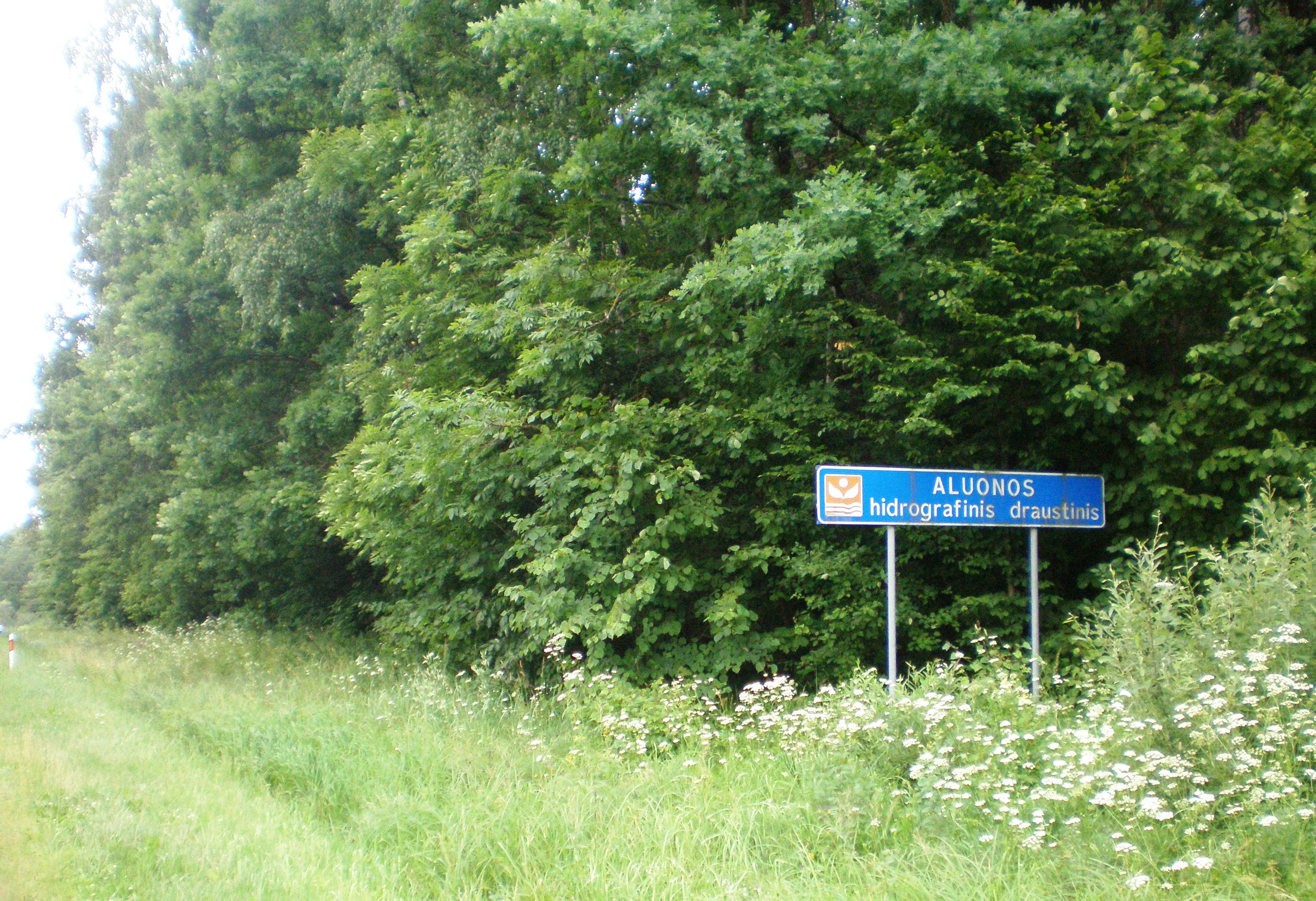
- A roadsign of the sanctuary

- Location within Lithuania Location within Kėdainiai District Municipality
- Location: Josvainiai Eldership, Kėdainiai District Municipality and Babtai Eldership, Kaunas District Municipality, Lithuania
- Nearest town: Josvainiai
- Coordinates: 55°09′22″N 23°47′17″E
- Area: 1.8 km^{2} (0.69 sq mi)
- Established: 1992
- Governing body: Lithuanian Service of Protected Areas

The Aluona Hydrographical Sanctuary (Lithuanian: Aluonos hidrografinis draustinis) is a protected area of a state importance in Josvainiai Eldership of Kėdainiai District Municipality and Babtai Eldership of Kaunas District Municipality, in central Lithuania. It was established in 1992 and covers an area of 1.8 square kilometres (0.69 sq mi). It covers the middle and the lower course of the Aluona. The sanctuary starts in Skaistgiriai village surroundings and ends near the Aluona confluence with the Nevėžis.

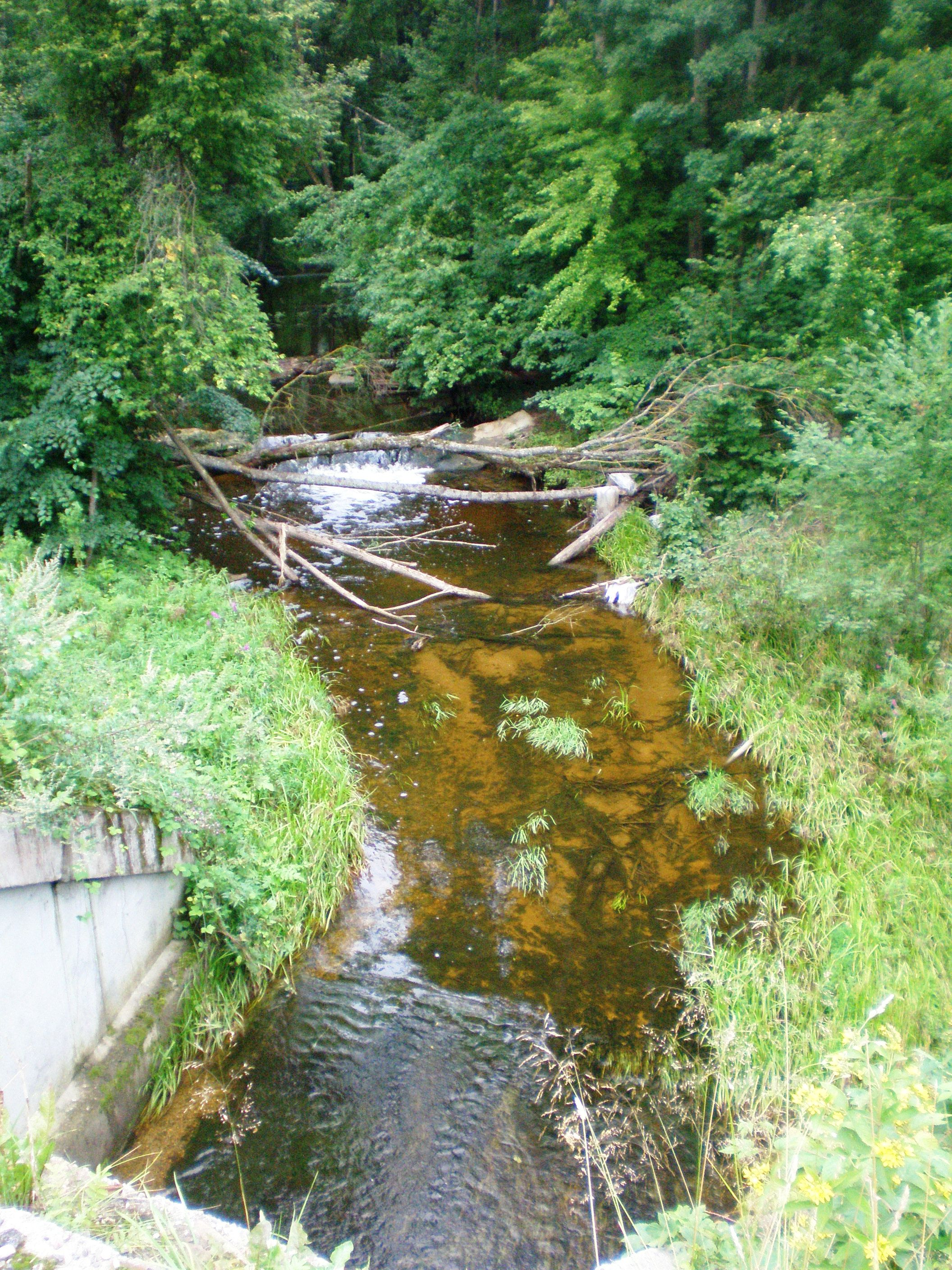
The lower course of the Aluona

The aim of the sanctuary is to protect the valley of the Aluona river with its erosive relief forms and the natural loopy course of the river.
