= Domeikava Eldership =

Domeikava Eldership Domeikavos seniūnija
- Eldership
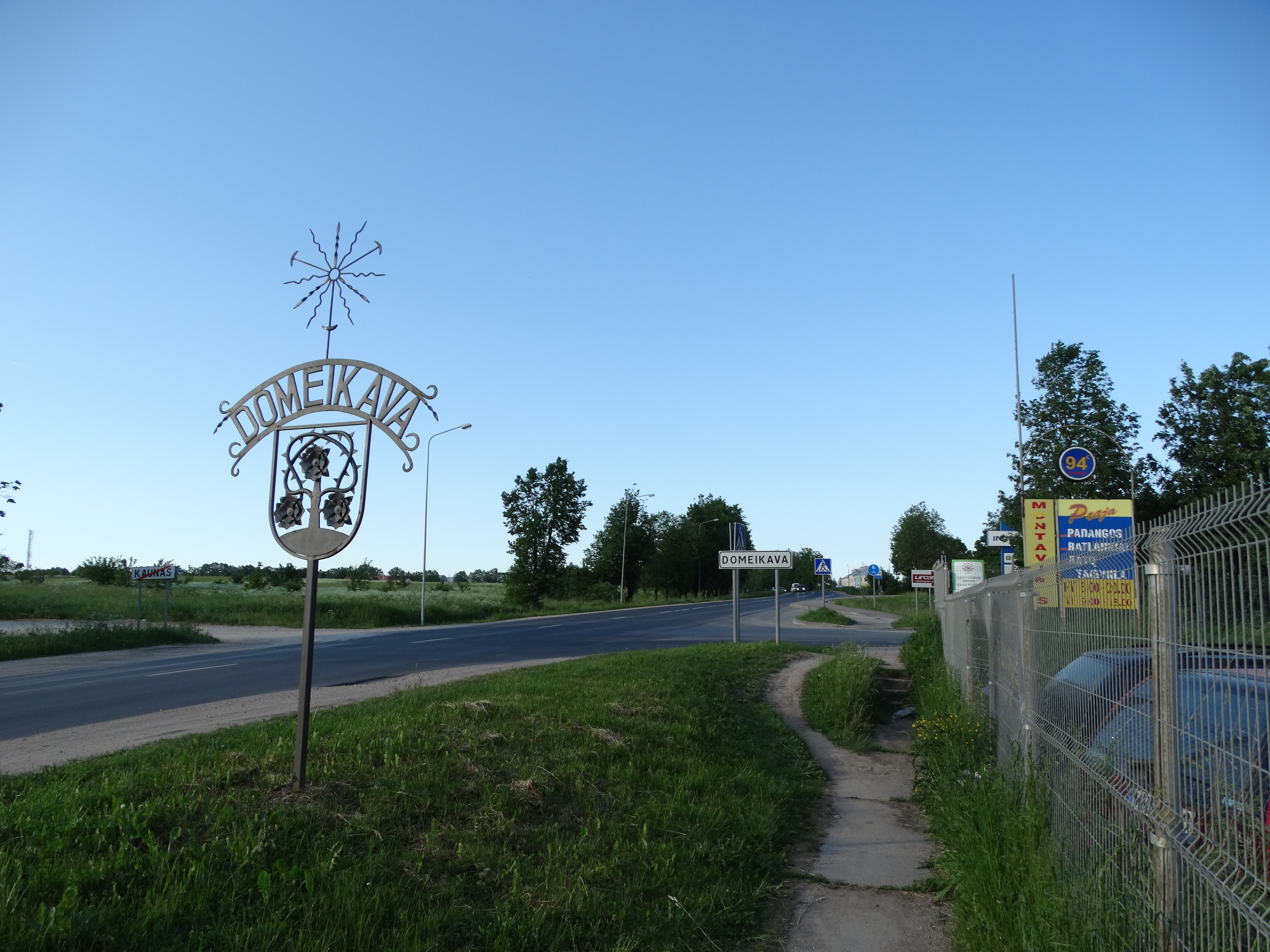
- Street in Domeikava

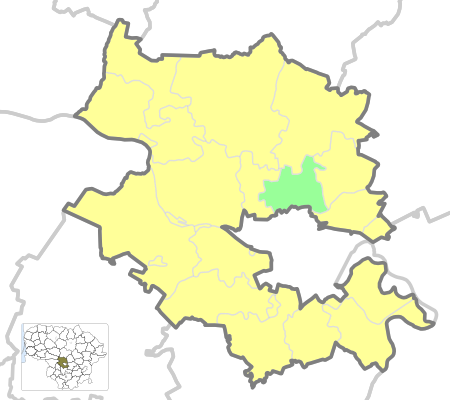
- Location of Domeikava Eldership
- Coordinates: 54.981°N 23.924°E
- Country: Lithuania
- Ethnographic region: Aukštaitija
- County: Kaunas County
- Municipality: Kaunas District Municipality
- Administrative centre: Domeikava

Area
  - Total: 58 km^{2} (22 sq mi)

Population (2021)
  - Total: 9,134
  - Density: 160/km^{2} (410/sq mi)
- Time zone: UTC+2 (EET)
  - Summer (DST): UTC+3 (EEST)

Domeikava Eldership (Lithuanian: Domeikavos seniūnija) is a Lithuanian eldership, located in the Kaunas District Municipality.
