= Kaunas municipality =

Kaunas municipality can refer to either of these two municipalities in Lithuania:

- Kaunas
- Kaunas District Municipality
