= Helmutas Šabasevičius =

Lithuanian dance historian

- Born: 3 October 1964 (age 62); Ežerėlis, Lithuanian SSR, USSR

Academic background
- Education: Vilnius Academy of Arts (1989)

Helmutas Šabasevičius (born 3 October 1964) is a Lithuanian historian of dance and art critic. His research interests include history of Lithuanian ballet and scenography as well as relations between art and theater.

== Career ==
Since 1995, Šabasevičius has been the editor-in-chief of the magazine Krantai dedicated to the history and modern state of Lithuanian art and its interactions with world art. He was awarded the Culture and Art Prize of the Government of the Republic of Lithuania in 2017 and the Order of Merit of the Republic of Poland in 2019.

== Bibliography ==
- Šabasevičius, Helmutas (2008). Life through dance: the artistic life of ballet soloist Leokadija Aškelovičiūtė (in Lithuanian). Vilnius: Krantai.
- Šabasevičius, Helmutas (2009). A concise history of Lithuanian ballet. Vilnius: Krantai.
