= Taurakiemis Eldership =

Taurakiemis Eldership Taurakiemio seniūnija
- Eldership
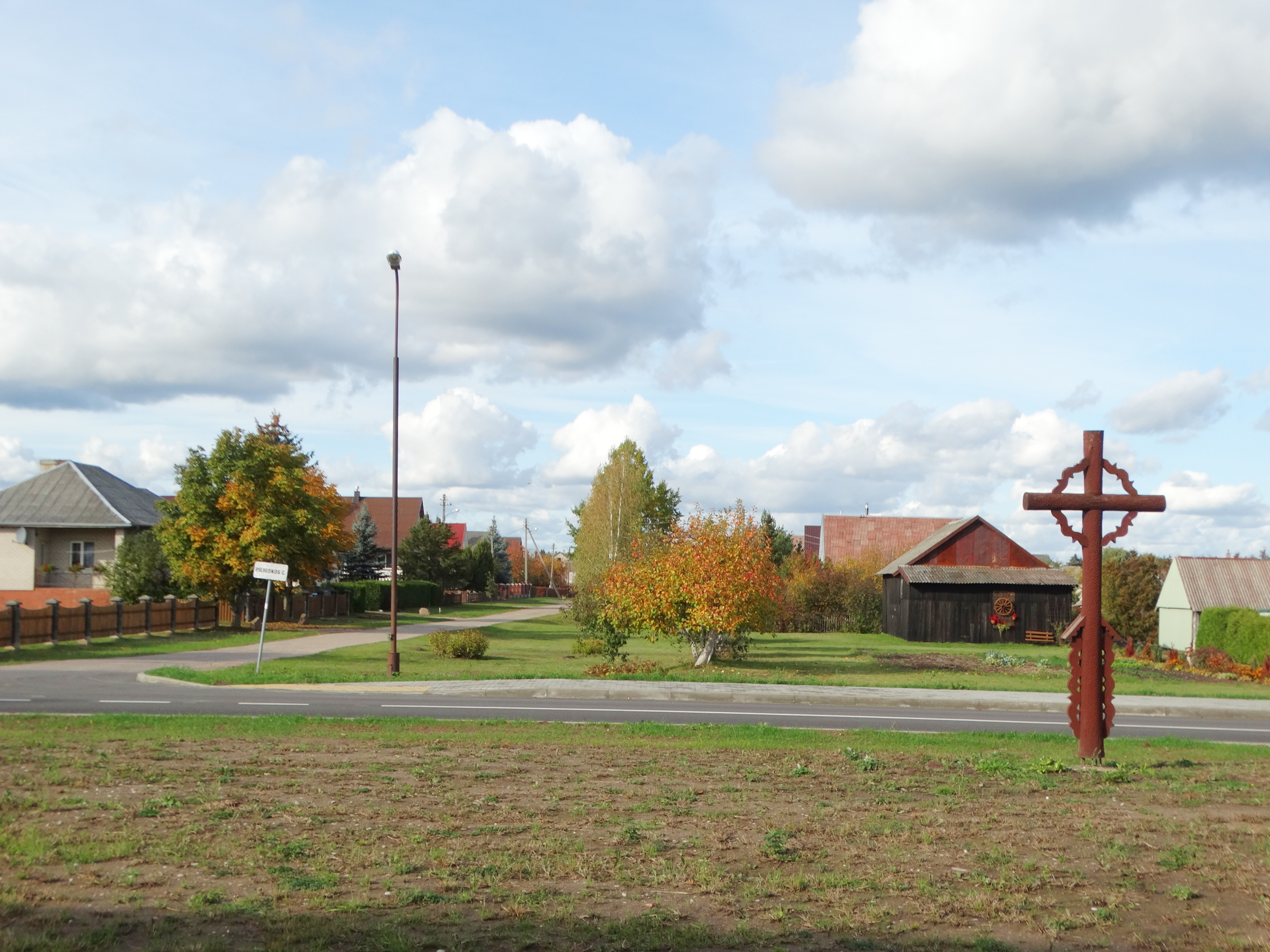
- Street in Piliuona

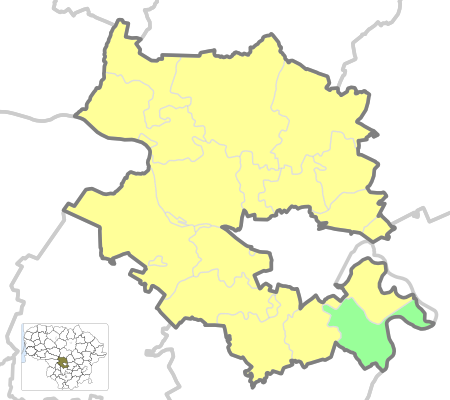
- Location of Taurakiemis Eldership
- Coordinates: 54.792°N 24.101°E
- Country: Lithuania
- Ethnographic region: Suvalkija
- County: Kaunas County
- Municipality: Kaunas District Municipality
- Administrative centre: Piliuona

Area
  - Total: 75 km^{2} (29 sq mi)

Population (2021)
  - Total: 1,661
  - Density: 22/km^{2} (57/sq mi)
- Time zone: UTC+2 (EET)
  - Summer (DST): UTC+3 (EEST)

Taurakiemis Eldership (Lithuanian: Taurakiemio seniūnija) is a Lithuanian eldership, located in the southern part of Kaunas District Municipality.
