= Rokai Eldership =

Rokai Eldership Rokų seniūnija
- Eldership
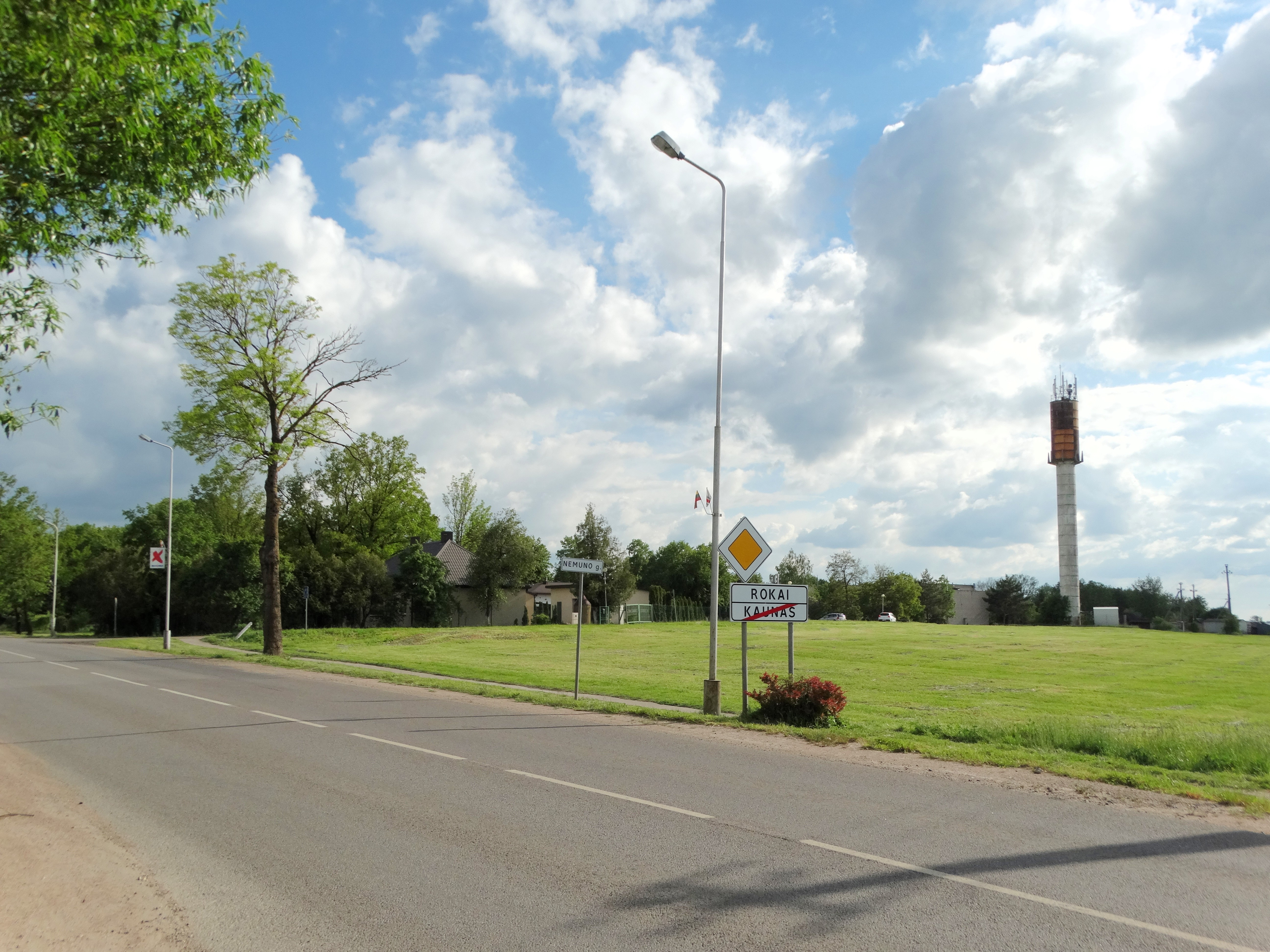
- Road to Rokai

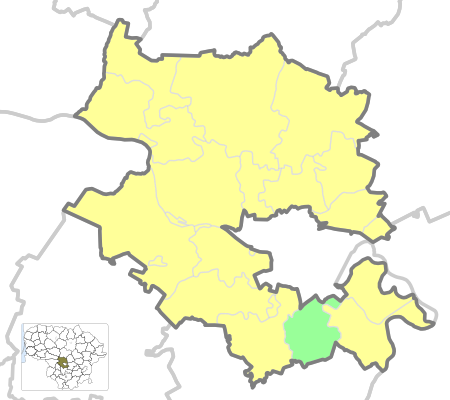
- Location of Rokai Eldership
- Coordinates: 54.800°N 23.965°E
- Country: Lithuania
- Ethnographic region: Suvalkija
- County: Kaunas County
- Municipality: Kaunas District Municipality
- Administrative centre: Rokai

Area
  - Total: 105 km^{2} (41 sq mi)

Population (2021)
  - Total: 5,642
  - Density: 53.7/km^{2} (139/sq mi)
- Time zone: UTC+2 (EET)
  - Summer (DST): UTC+3 (EEST)

Rokai Eldership (Lithuanian: Rokų seniūnija) is a Lithuanian eldership, located in the southern part of Kaunas District Municipality.
