= Šatijai =

- Village
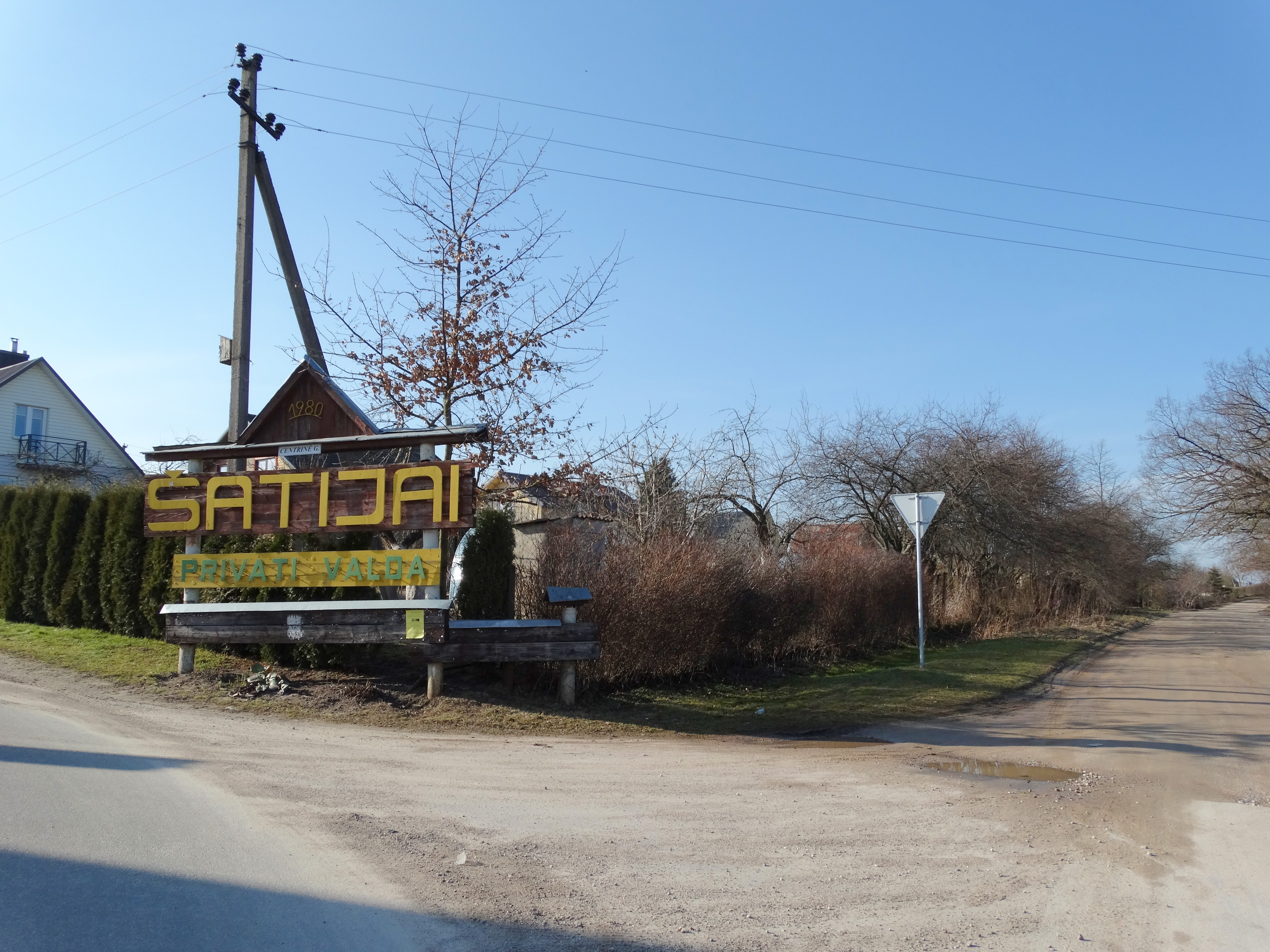
- Šatijai on 2015

- Location of Šatijai
- Coordinates: 54°59′10″N 23°59′40″E
- Country: Lithuania
- Ethnographic region: Aukštaitija
- County: Kaunas County
- Municipality: Kaunas district municipality
- Eldership: Lapės eldership

Population (2011)
  - Total: 415
- Time zone: UTC+2 (EET)
  - Summer (DST): UTC+3 (EEST)

Šatijai is a village near Kaunas in Lithuania. It has a red brick estate, built in 1889 by the Christauskai family. In 1966 the estate consisted of a house, large stables, barn, granary, smithy, and garden. Until restoration of Lithuania's independence in 1990, the estate was neglected and fell in ruins. Consequently, the building was restored and turned into a restaurant and guesthouse. According to the 2011 census, the village had 415 residents.
