= Vandžiogala Eldership =

Vandžiogala Eldership Vandžiogalos seniūnija
- Eldership
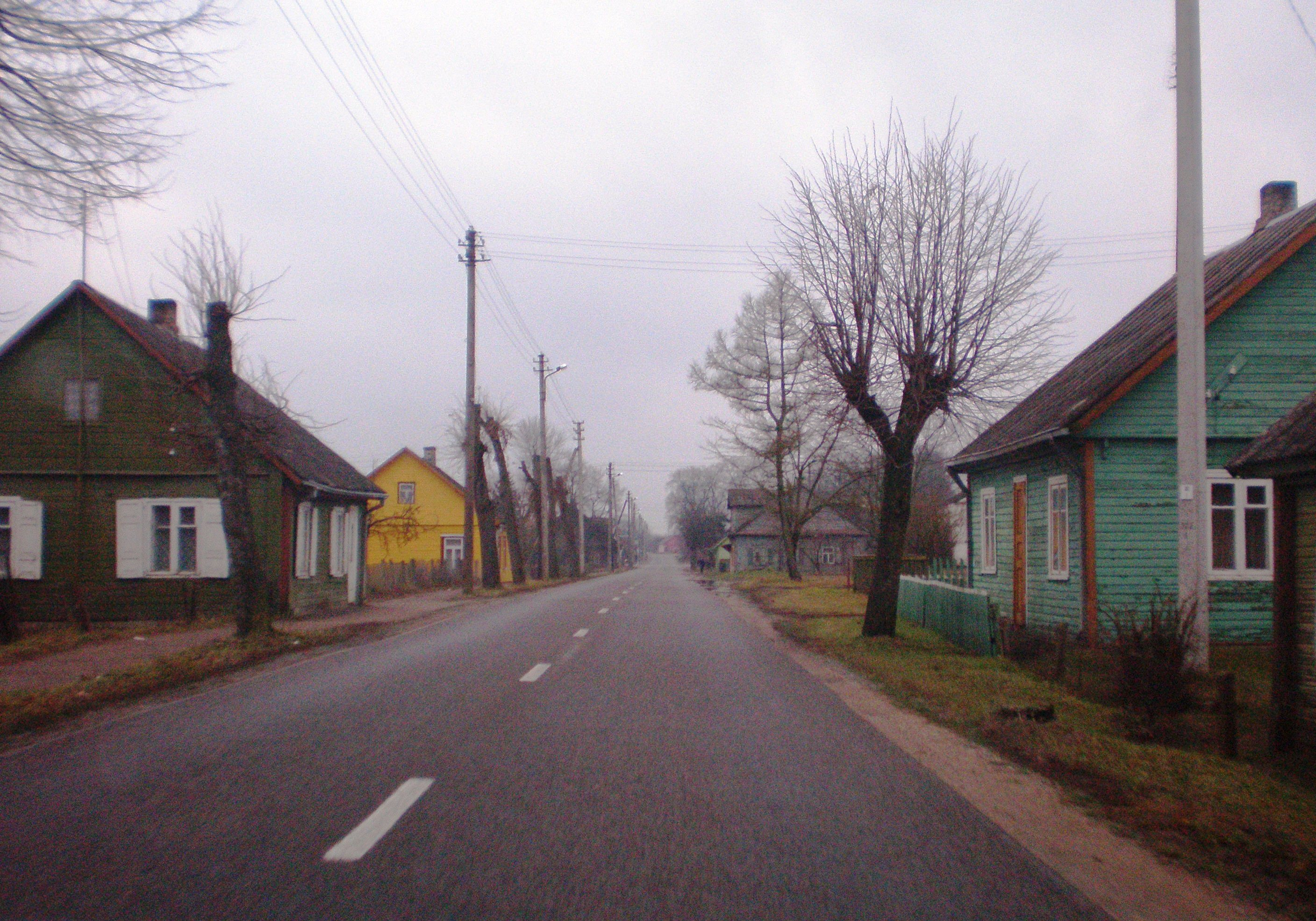
- Road to Vandžiogala

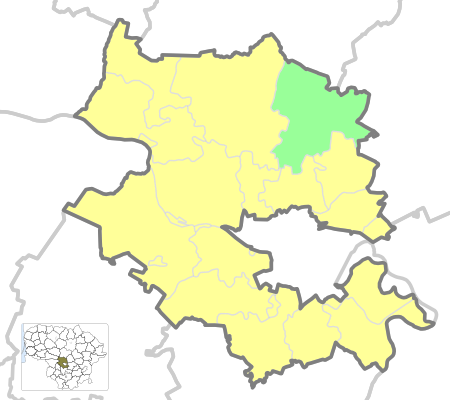
- Location of Vandžiogaloa Eldership
- Coordinates: 55.083°N 23.962°E
- Country: Lithuania
- Ethnographic region: Aukštaitija
- County: Kaunas County
- Municipality: Kaunas District Municipality
- Administrative centre: Vandžiogala

Area
  - Total: 126 km^{2} (49 sq mi)

Population (2021)
  - Total: 1,335
  - Density: 10.6/km^{2} (27.4/sq mi)
- Time zone: UTC+2 (EET)
  - Summer (DST): UTC+3 (EEST)

Vandžiogala Eldership (Lithuanian: Vandžiogalos seniūnija) is a Lithuanian eldership, located in the northern part of Kaunas District Municipality.
