= Batniava Eldership =

Batniava Eldership Batniavos seniūnija
- Eldership
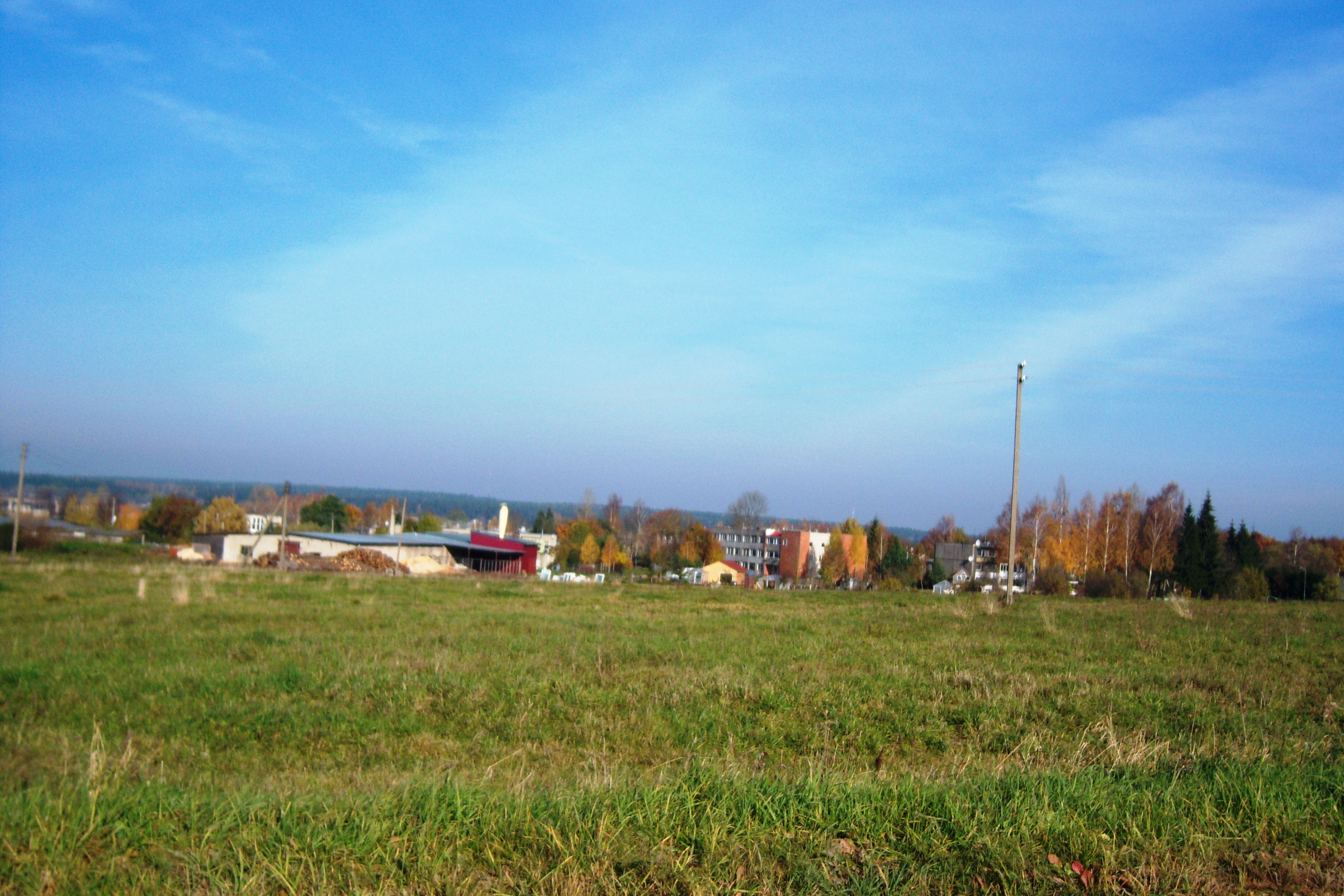
- Bubiai village

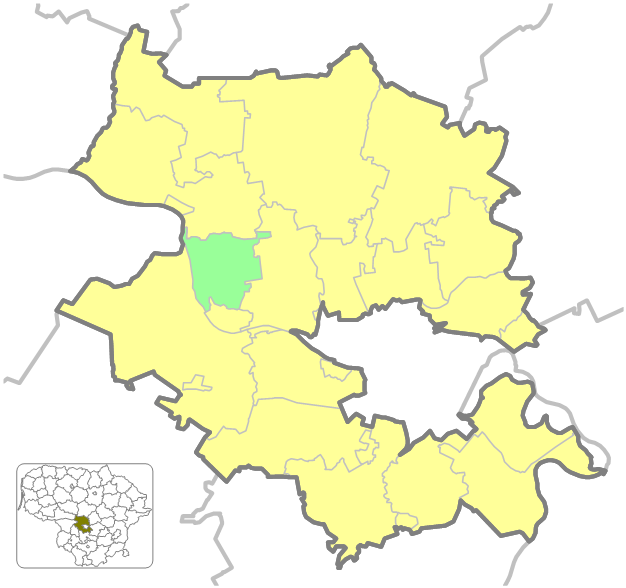
- Location of Batniava Eldership
- Coordinates: 54.989°N 23.647°E
- Country: Lithuania
- Ethnographic region: Aukštaitija
- County: Kaunas County
- Municipality: Kaunas District Municipality
- Administrative centre: Bubiai

Area
  - Total: 43 km^{2} (17 sq mi)

Population (2021)
  - Total: 1,168
  - Density: 27/km^{2} (70/sq mi)
- Time zone: UTC+2 (EET)
  - Summer (DST): UTC+3 (EEST)

Batniava Eldership (Lithuanian: Batniavos seniūnija) is a Lithuanian eldership, located in the western part of Kaunas District Municipality.
