= Bubiai =

- Village
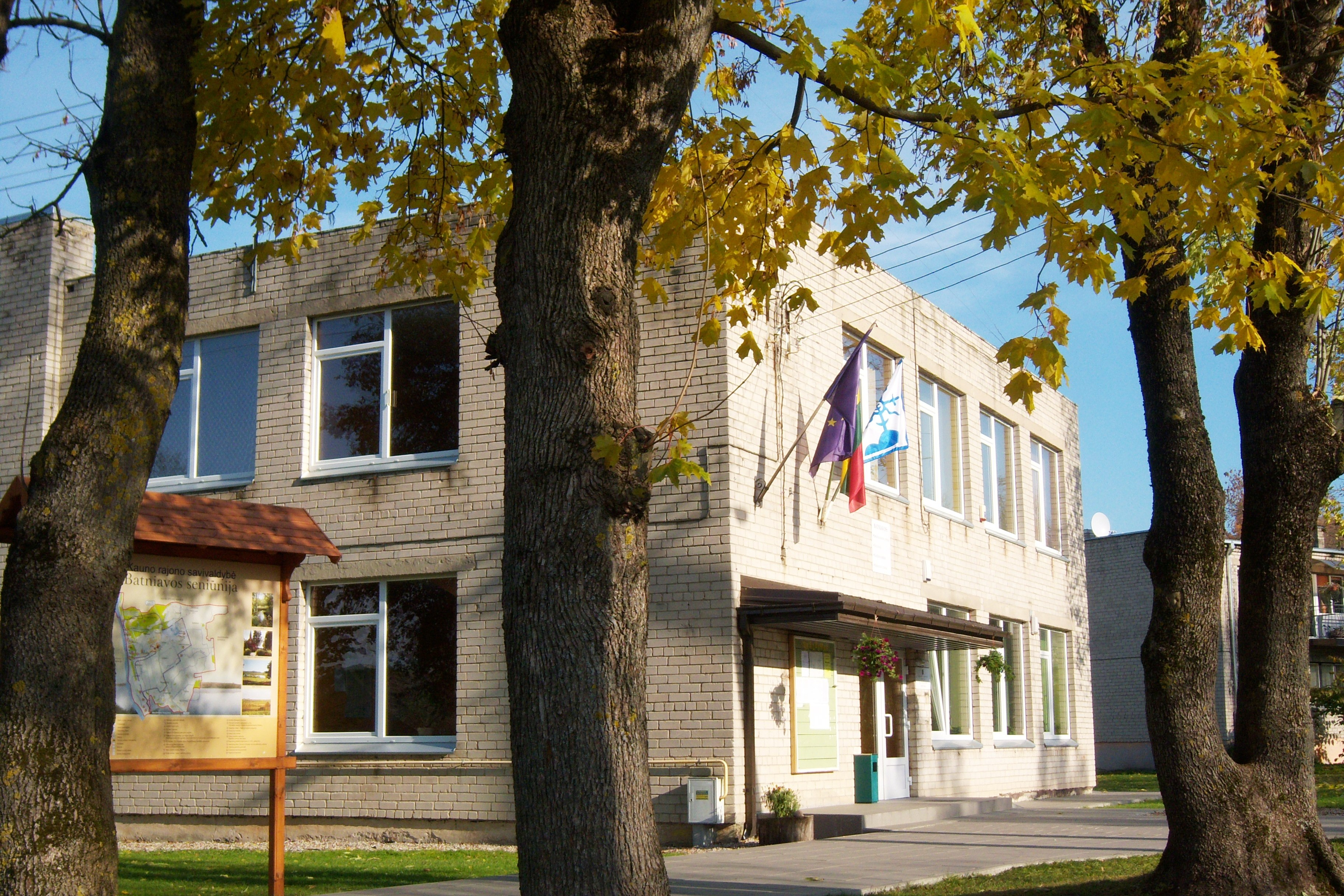
- Eldership administration building

- Location in Lithuania
- Coordinates: 54°59′28″N 23°37′55″E
- Country: Lithuania
- Ethnographic region: Aukštaitija
- County: Kaunas County
- Municipality: Kaunas district municipality

Population (2021)
  - Total: 642
- Time zone: UTC+2 (EET)
  - Summer (DST): UTC+3 (EEST)

Bubiai is a village in Kaunas district municipality, in Kaunas County, in central Lithuania. According to the 2021 census, the village has a population of 642 people.
