= Neveronys =

- Village
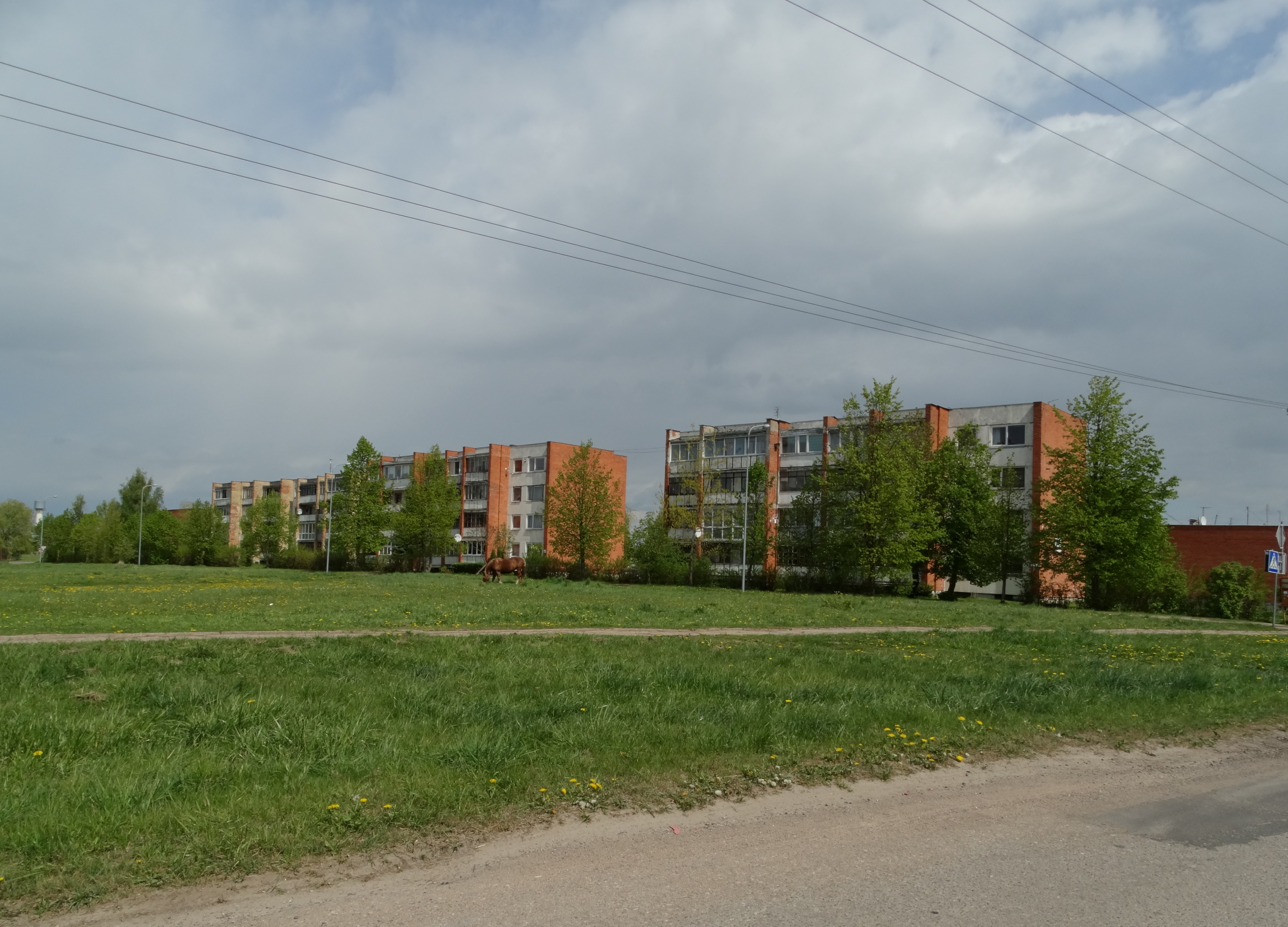
- Street in Neveronys

- Coat of arms

- Location in Lithuania
- Coordinates: 54°55′48″N 24°05′56″E
- Country: Lithuania
- Ethnographic region: Aukštaitija
- County: Kaunas County
- Municipality: Kaunas district municipality

Population (2021)
  - Total: 2,672
- Time zone: UTC+2 (EET)
  - Summer (DST): UTC+3 (EEST)

Neveronys is a village in Kaunas district municipality, in Kaunas County, in northern Lithuania. According to the 2021 census, the village has a population of 2,672 people.

== Etymology ==
It is believed that "Neveronys" is a manorial place name, originating from the surname Neverovičiai, which is mentioned in the 16th-century military list of the Grand Duchy of Lithuania.

== History ==
Neveronys was first mentioned in historical sources from 1744.

In 1923, two villages were located in the region: Senieji Neveronys and Naujieji Neveronys. They were separated by the Vilnius–Kaunas Railway. In Senieji Neveronys, a primary school was constructed in 1927, founded by Jonas Jankauskas. In 1934, the school moved to the house of Zigmas Apanavičius, a rifleman of the Lithuanian army, Naujieji Neveronys. The school operated for only a year, moving to Palemonas. Two wooden buildings have survived since then.

During the Soviet era, Neveronys was an auxiliary settlement. In 1959, the residents of the village of Vieškūnai, who had been moved due to construction of the Kaunas Hydroelectric Power Plant, moved to Neveronys alongside. The Vieškūnai primary school was then closed.

In 1966, the Construction and Repair Board of the Deaf Society was established in Neveronys, alongside a shop, residential block, and a school. In 1970, a local library was established.

In 1978, Council of Ministers of the Lithuanian SSR approved the construction of the Neveronių greenhouse complex in the village of Pabiržis. In 1993, the greenhouse complex was converted into a secondary school.

In 1998, the Neveronių Cultural Center was established.

In 2009, the coat of arms of Neveronių was approved.
