= Babtai =

- Town
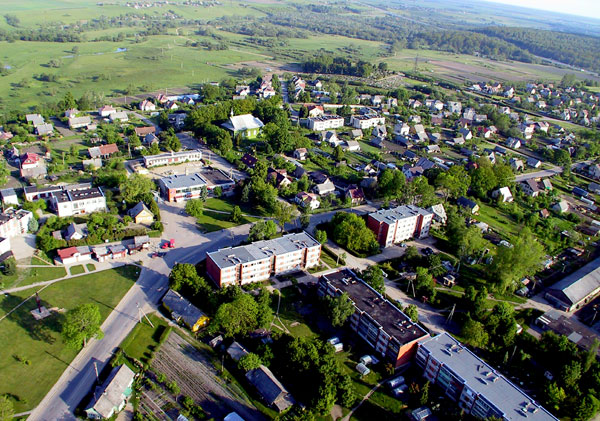

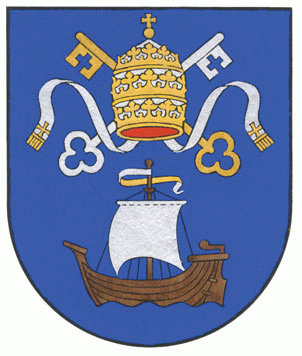
- Coat of arms

- Location in Lithuania
- Coordinates: 55°05′30″N 23°47′40″E
- Country: Lithuania
- Ethnographic region: Aukštaitija
- County: Kaunas County
- Municipality: Kaunas district municipality
- Eldership: Babtai eldership
- Capital of: Babtai eldership

Population (2011)
  - Total: 1,563
- Time zone: UTC+2 (EET)
  - Summer (DST): UTC+3 (EEST)

Babtai is a small town 24 km (15 mi) north of Kaunas, in Kaunas County, in central Lithuania. It is situated on the left bank of the Nevėžis River. As of 2011 it had a population of 1,563.

== History ==
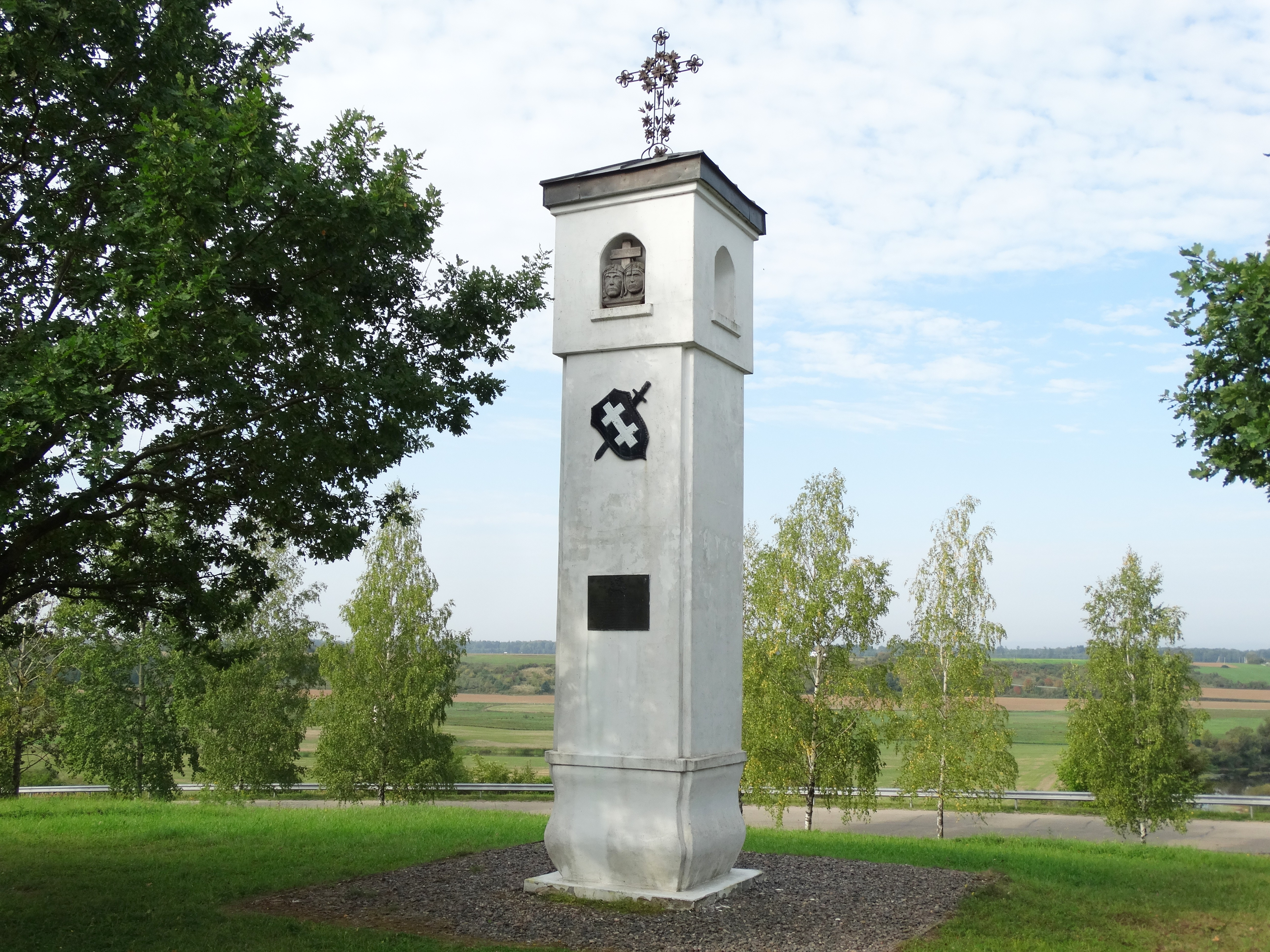
A monument to Steponas Darius and Stasys Girėnas, Lituanica pilots

Babtai were mentioned in 1394 in Die Littauischen Wegeberichte of crusaders as patrimony (kiemas Baptindorf). Most likely the same place was mentioned in the report of Teutonic spies - "von dannen czu Bapto j mile" in 1386. In 1394 few homesteads were known, big gates were mentioned. Since the end of 15th century till 18th century Babtai was a domain of the Grand Duke of Lithuania. In 16th century and 17th century Babtai was a vivid trade center. Situated on the historic road from Kaunas to Riga, it played a role in the trade between Lithuania and Livonia. In 1672 the first Babtai church was built. Since 1777 parish school was operating. In 1732 Babtai town got a privilege to arrange weekly markets.

In 1792, the town received Magdeburg rights and coat of arms. Babtai suffered from frequent fires. The town declined after construction of railways.

At the turn of 1918 and 1919, the mostly Polish inhabitants of the Babtai commune sent a resolution to Kaunas, declaring that they would neither pay taxes nor recognize mobilization decreed by the Lithuanian government. In response, the Lithuanian government sent troops to Babtai, which enforced compliance through arrests and penalties.

About 300 to 400 Jews of Babtai and Vandžiogala were executed in a mass execution between August 28 and September 2, 1941. This crime was perpetrated by an Einsatzgruppen of Germans helped by local collaborationists.
