= Čekiškė Eldership =

Čekiškė Eldership Čekiškės seniūnija
- Eldership
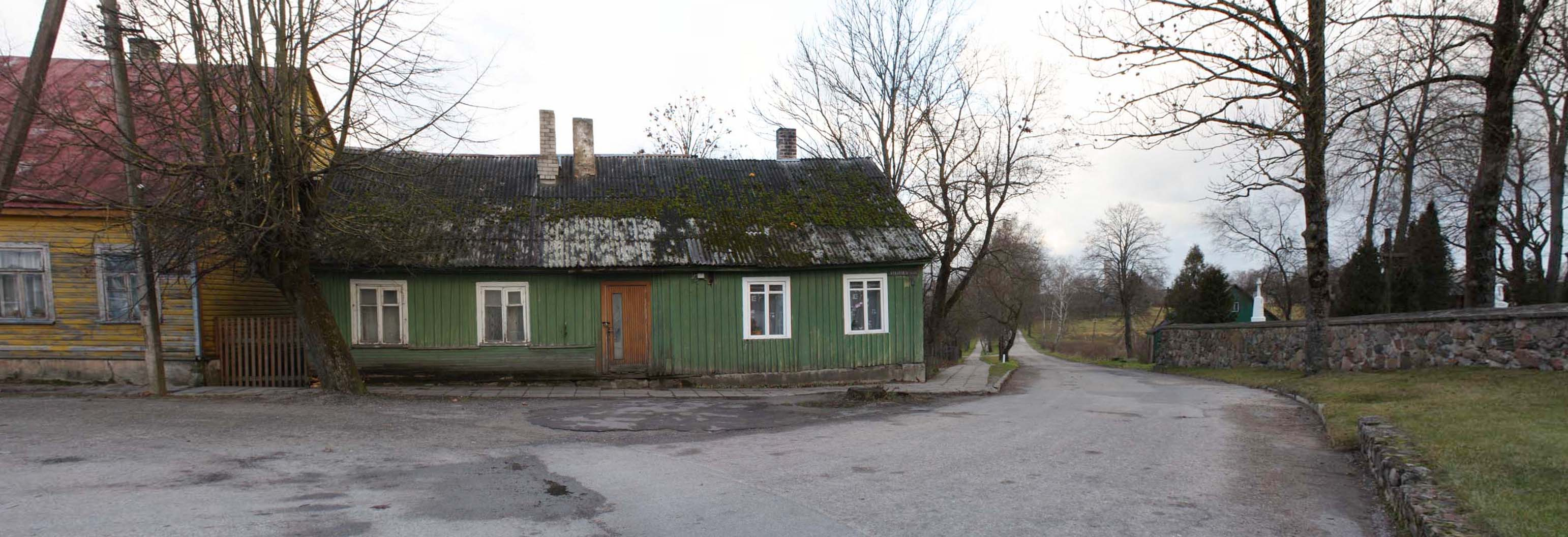
- Street in Čekiškė

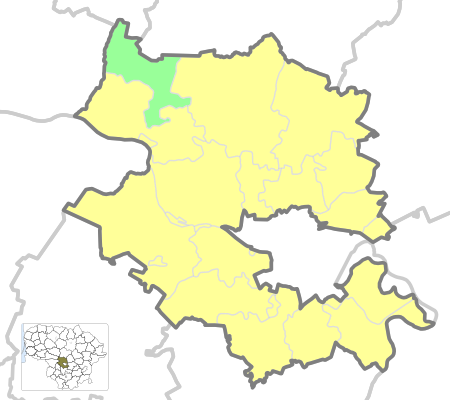
- Location of Čekiškė Eldership
- Coordinates: 55.132°N 23.587°E
- Country: Lithuania
- Ethnographic region: Aukštaitija
- County: Kaunas County
- Municipality: Kaunas District Municipality
- Administrative centre: Čekiškė

Area
  - Total: 83 km^{2} (32 sq mi)

Population (2021)
  - Total: 1,417
  - Density: 17/km^{2} (44/sq mi)
- Time zone: UTC+2 (EET)
  - Summer (DST): UTC+3 (EEST)

Čekiškė Eldership (Lithuanian: Čekiškės seniūnija) is a Lithuanian eldership, located in the western part of Kaunas District Municipality.
