= Babtai Eldership =

Babtai Eldership Babtų seniūnija
- Eldership
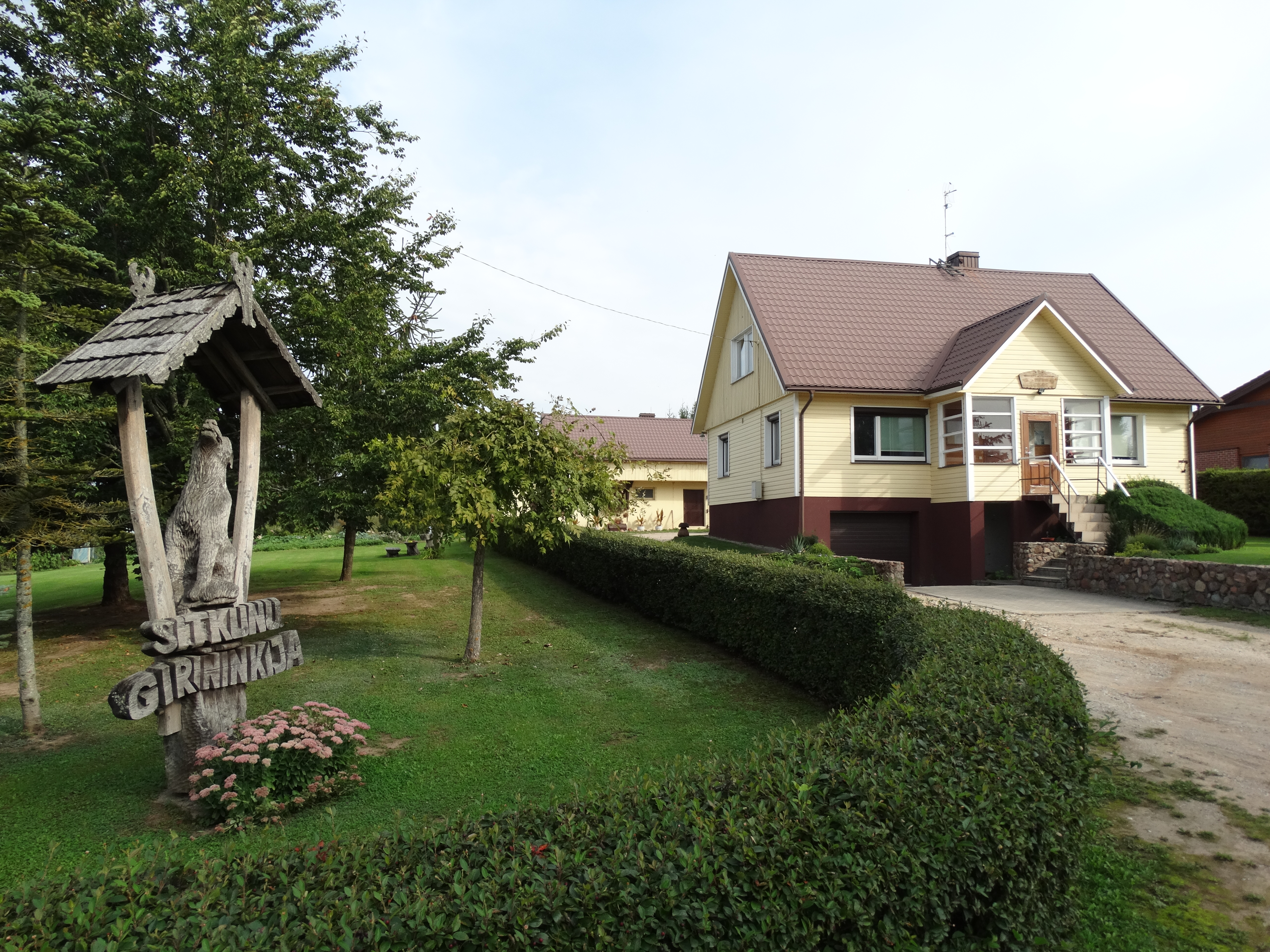
- Street in Babtai

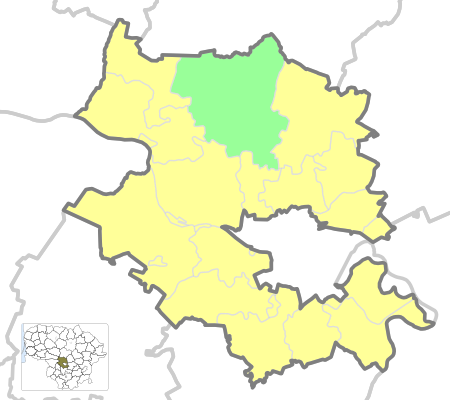
- Location of Babtai Eldership
- Coordinates: 55.100°N 23.789°E
- Country: Lithuania
- Ethnographic region: Aukštaitija
- County: Kaunas County
- Municipality: Kaunas District Municipality
- Administrative centre: Babtai

Area
  - Total: 143 km^{2} (55 sq mi)

Population (2021)
  - Total: 3,951
  - Density: 27.6/km^{2} (71.6/sq mi)
- Time zone: UTC+2 (EET)
  - Summer (DST): UTC+3 (EEST)

Babtai Eldership (Lithuanian: Babtų seniūnija) is a Lithuanian eldership, located in the northern part of Kaunas District Municipality.
