= Kulautuva =

- Town
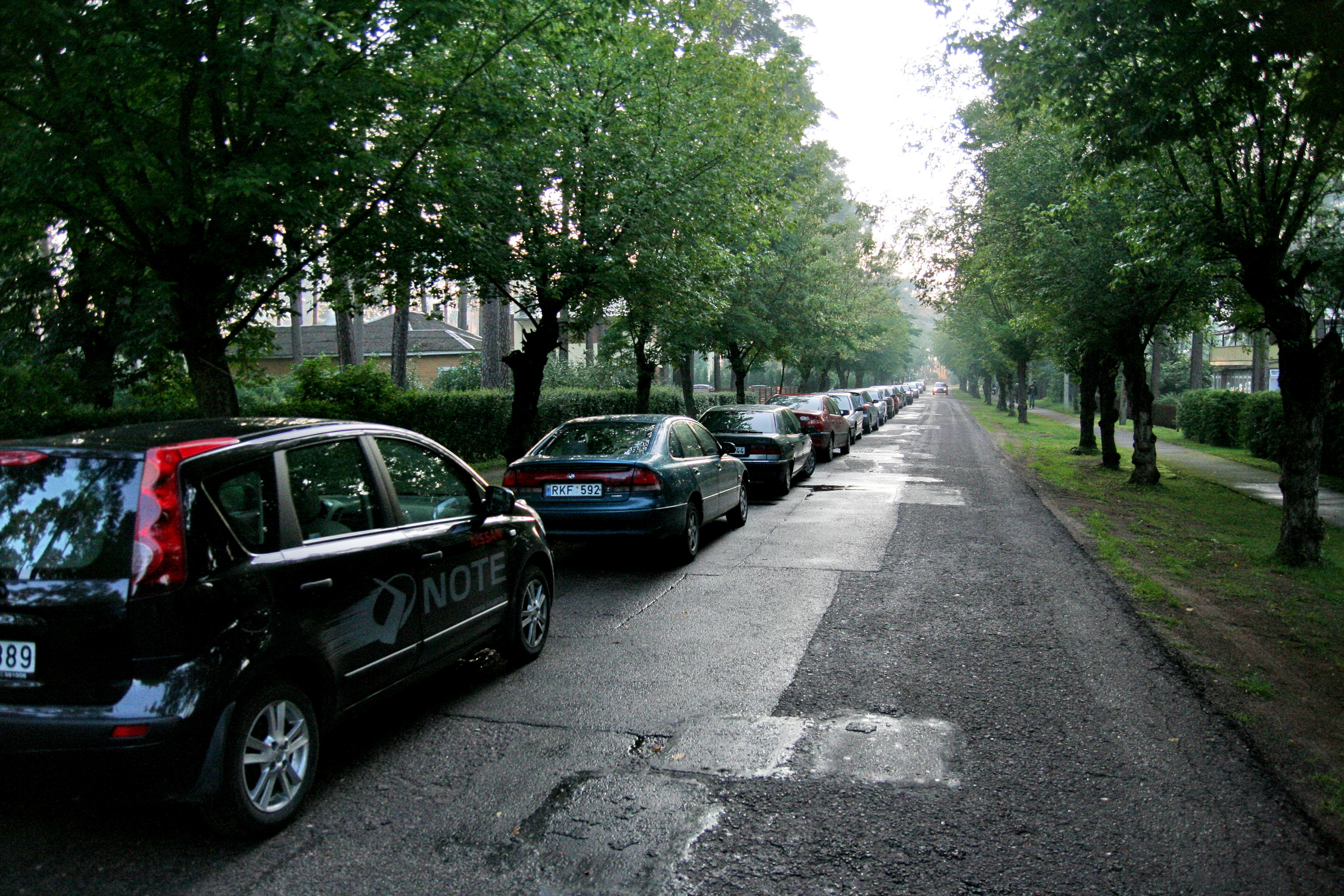
- Street in Kulautuva

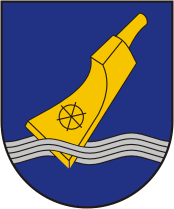
- Coat of arms

- Location in Lithuania
- Coordinates: 54°56′20″N 23°39′00″E
- Country: Lithuania
- County: Kaunas County
- Municipality: Kaunas district municipality
- Eldership: Kulautuva eldership

Population (2011)
  - Total: 1,425
- Time zone: UTC+2 (EET)
  - Summer (DST): UTC+3 (EEST)

Kulautuva is a town in Kaunas district municipality, in Kaunas County, in central Lithuania. It is situated on the right bank of the Nemunas River. According to the 2011 census, the village has a population of 1,425 people. A number of Kaunas city politicians, artists and foreign diplomats have been resting here since long ago. Since long ago, people who came from neighboring countries have strengthened their health here. Kulautuva was famous not only for the first sanatorium and the most modern hotel in the Baltic States, but also for its pine forests, which are especially beneficial for health.

The town of Kulautuva is a popular tourist destination in Kaunas district. Forest recreation areas are suitable for rest, leisure, holidays or family outings for the weekend.
