= Užliedžiai Eldership =

Užliedžiai Eldership Užliedžių seniūnija
- Eldership
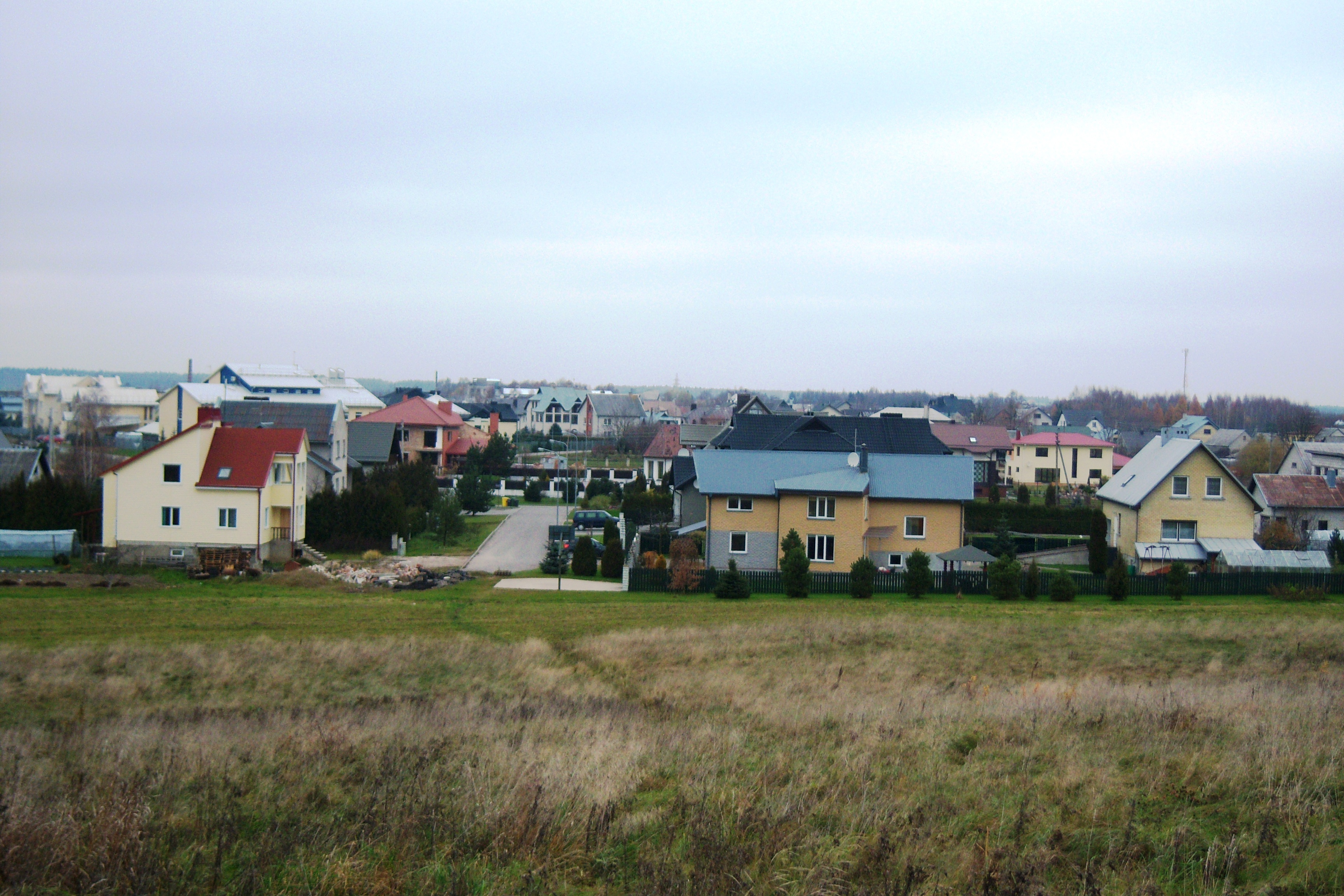
- Giraitė

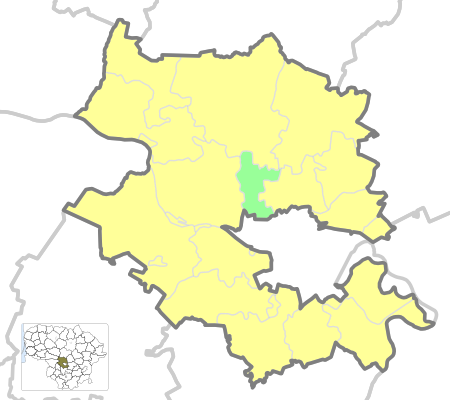
- Location of Užliedžiai Eldership
- Coordinates: 54.985°N 23.826°E
- Country: Lithuania
- Ethnographic region: Aukštaitija
- County: Kaunas County
- Municipality: Kaunas District Municipality
- Administrative centre: Giraitė

Area
  - Total: 34 km^{2} (13 sq mi)

Population (2021)
  - Total: 6,481
  - Density: 190/km^{2} (490/sq mi)
- Time zone: UTC+2 (EET)
  - Summer (DST): UTC+3 (EEST)

Užliedžiai Eldership (Lithuanian: Užliedžių seniūnija) is a Lithuanian eldership, located in the central part of Kaunas District Municipality.
