= Ringaudai Eldership =

Ringaudai Eldership Ringaudų seniūnija
- Eldership
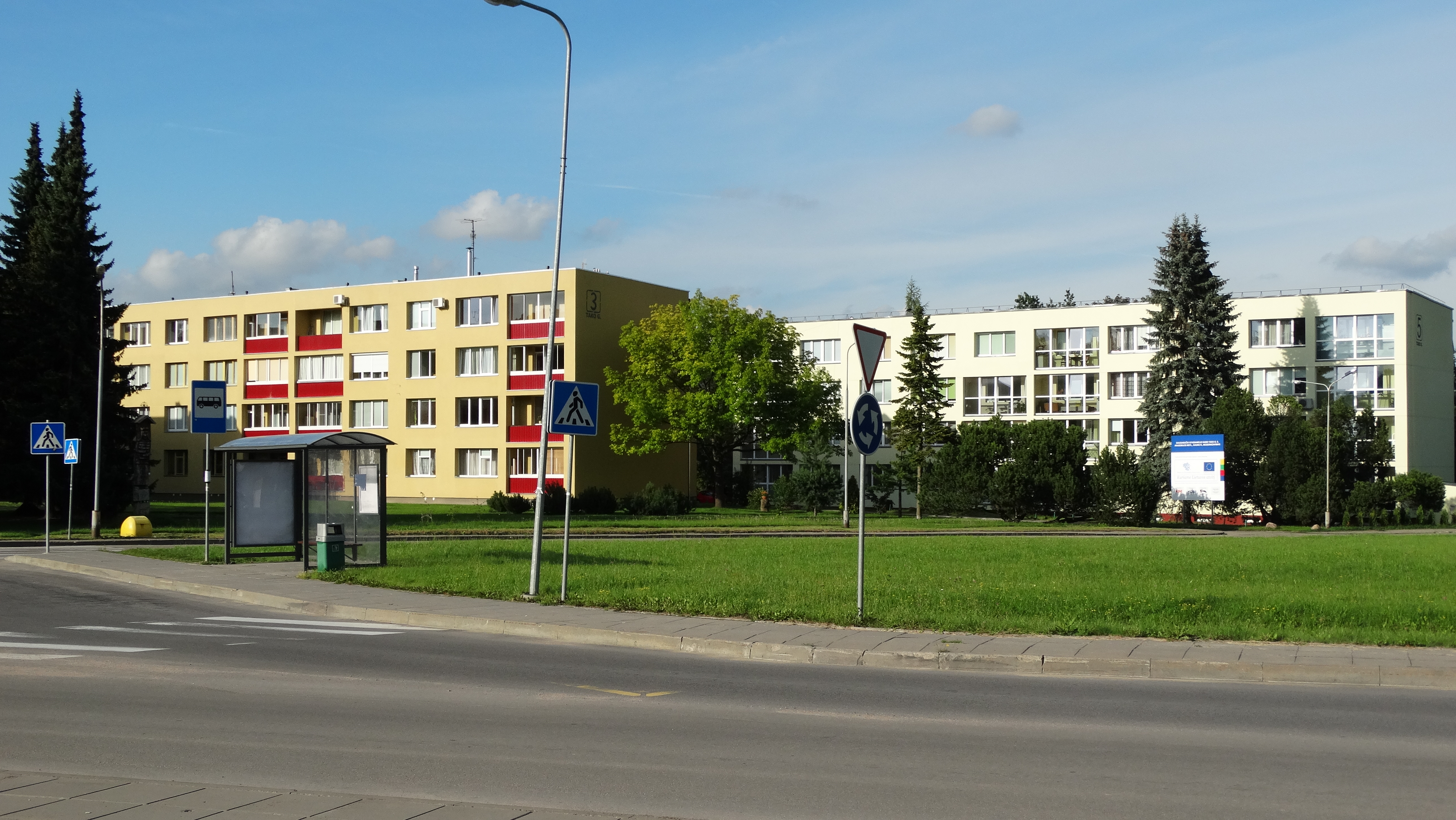
- Street in Akademija

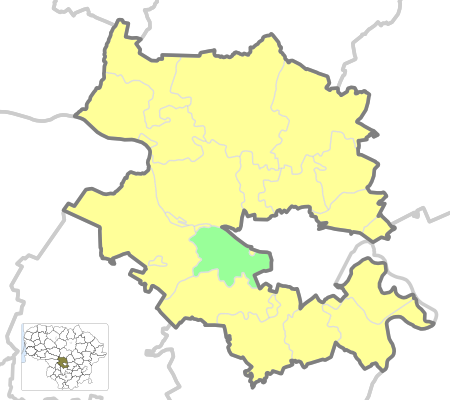
- Location of Ringaudai Eldership
- Coordinates: 54.894°N 23.765°E
- Country: Lithuania
- Ethnographic region: Suvalkija
- County: Kaunas County
- Municipality: Kaunas District Municipality
- Administrative centre: Akademija

Area
  - Total: 59 km^{2} (23 sq mi)

Population (2021)
  - Total: 7,892
  - Density: 130/km^{2} (350/sq mi)
- Time zone: UTC+2 (EET)
  - Summer (DST): UTC+3 (EEST)

Ringaudai Eldership (Lithuanian: Ringaudų seniūnija) is a Lithuanian eldership, located in the western part of Kaunas District Municipality.
