= Linksmakalnis =

- Village
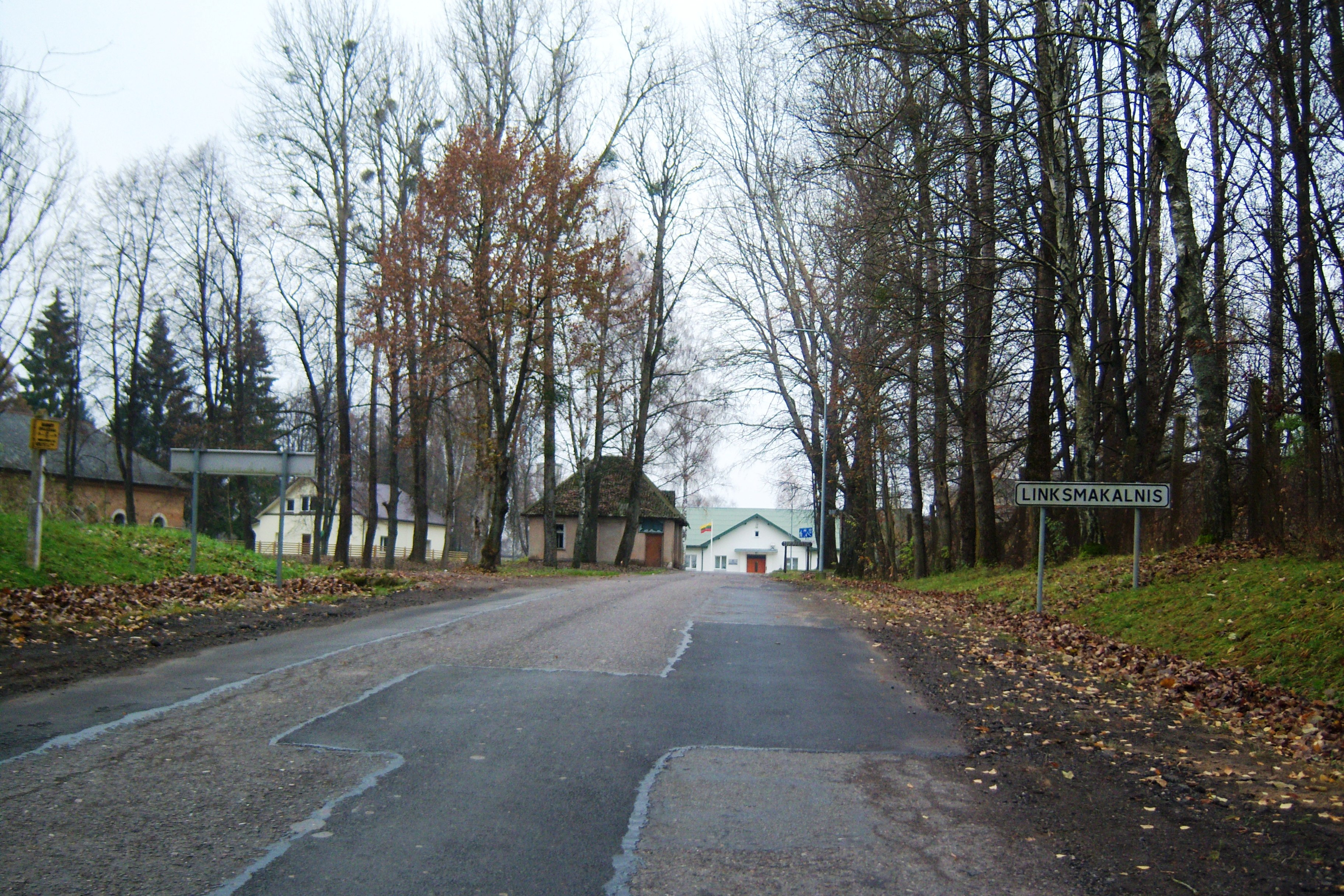
- Street in Linksmakalnis

- Location in Lithuania
- Coordinates: 54°45′00″N 23°55′00″E
- Country: Lithuania
- Ethnographic region: Suvalkija
- County: Kaunas County
- Municipality: Kaunas district municipality

Population (2021)
  - Total: 634
- Time zone: UTC+2 (EET)
  - Summer (DST): UTC+3 (EEST)

Linksmakalnis is a village in Kaunas district municipality, in Kaunas County, in central Lithuania. According to the 2021 census, the village has a population of 634 people.
