= Garliava Area Eldership =

Garliava Area Eldership Garliavos apylinkių seniūnija
- Eldership
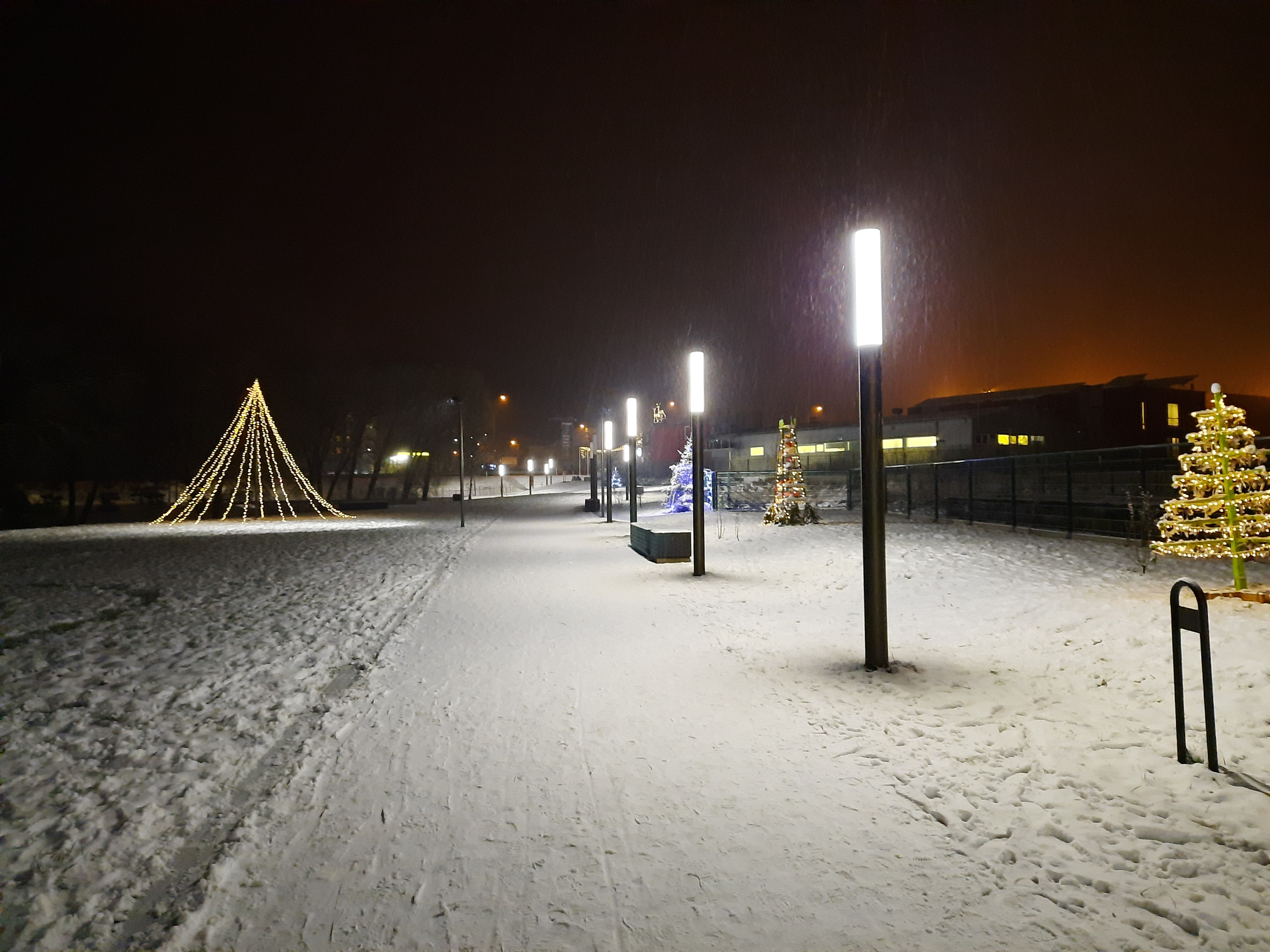
- Garliava in winter

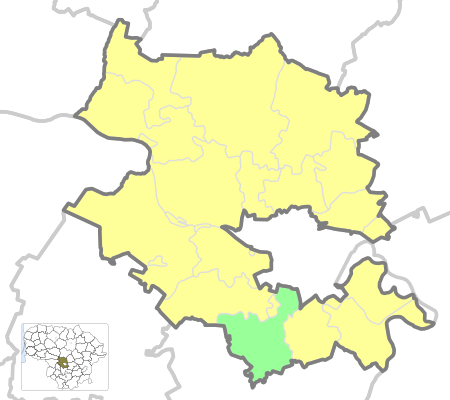
- Location of Garliava Eldership
- Coordinates: 54.781°N 23.845°E
- Country: Lithuania
- Ethnographic region: Suvalkija
- County: Kaunas County
- Municipality: Kaunas District Municipality
- Administrative centre: Garliava

Area
  - Total: 84 km^{2} (32 sq mi)

Population (2021)
  - Total: 7,751
  - Density: 92/km^{2} (240/sq mi)
- Time zone: UTC+2 (EET)
  - Summer (DST): UTC+3 (EEST)

Garliava Area Eldership (Lithuanian: Garliavos apylinkių seniūnija) is a Lithuanian eldership, located in the southern part of Kaunas District Municipality.
