= Lapės Eldership =

Lapės Eldership Lapių seniūnija
- Eldership
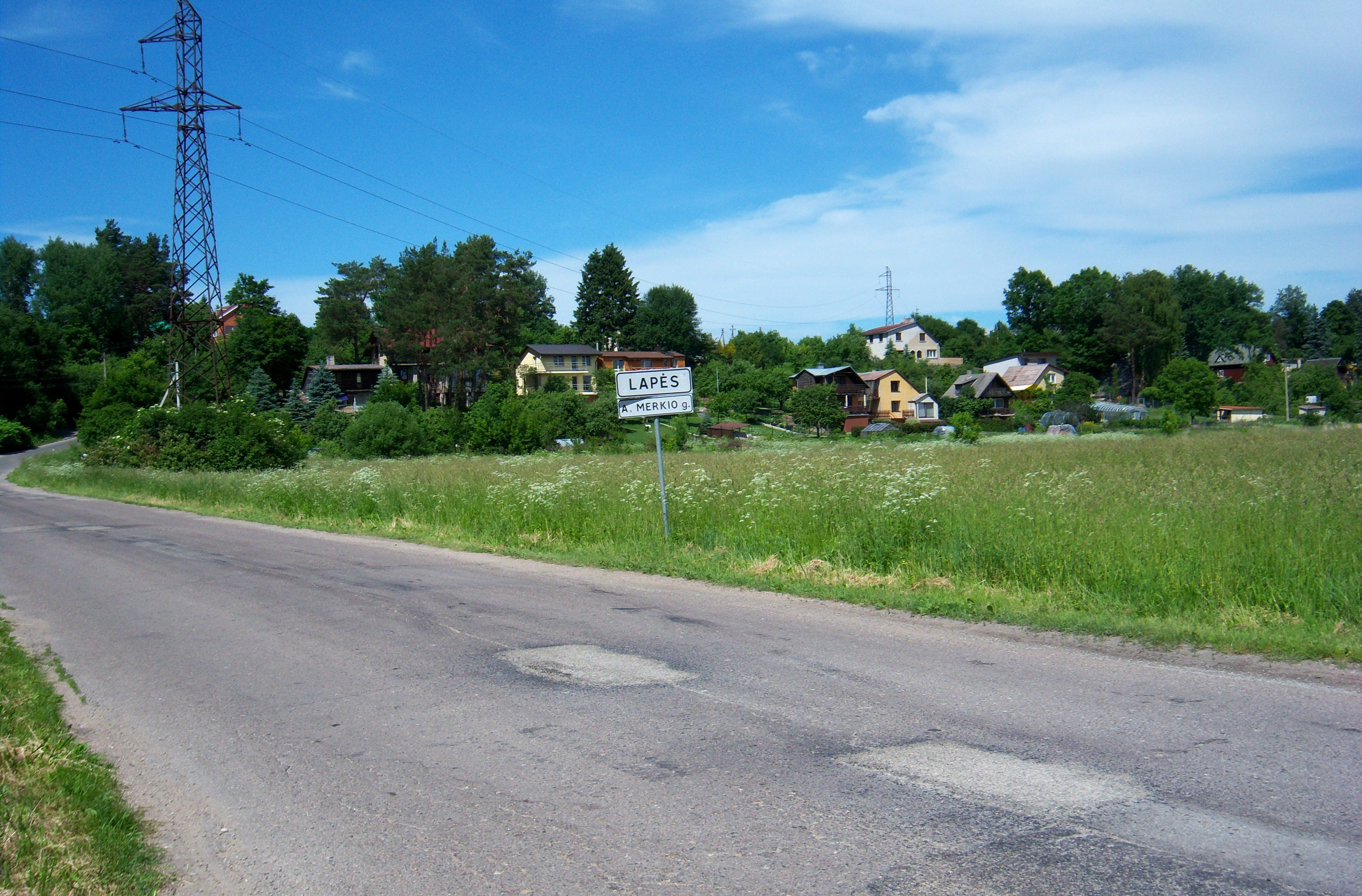
- Road to Lapės

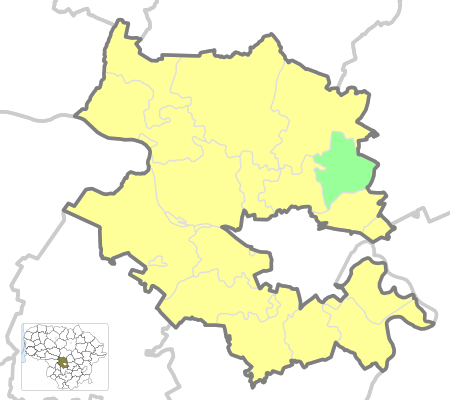
- Location of Lapės Eldership
- Coordinates: 55.009°N 24.027°E
- Country: Lithuania
- Ethnographic region: Aukštaitija
- County: Kaunas County
- Municipality: Kaunas District Municipality
- Administrative centre: Lapės

Area
  - Total: 57 km^{2} (22 sq mi)

Population (2021)
  - Total: 3,547
  - Density: 62/km^{2} (160/sq mi)
- Time zone: UTC+2 (EET)
  - Summer (DST): UTC+3 (EEST)

Lapės Eldership (Lithuanian: Lapių seniūnija) is a Lithuanian eldership, located in the eastern part of Kaunas District Municipality.
