= Piliuona =

- Village
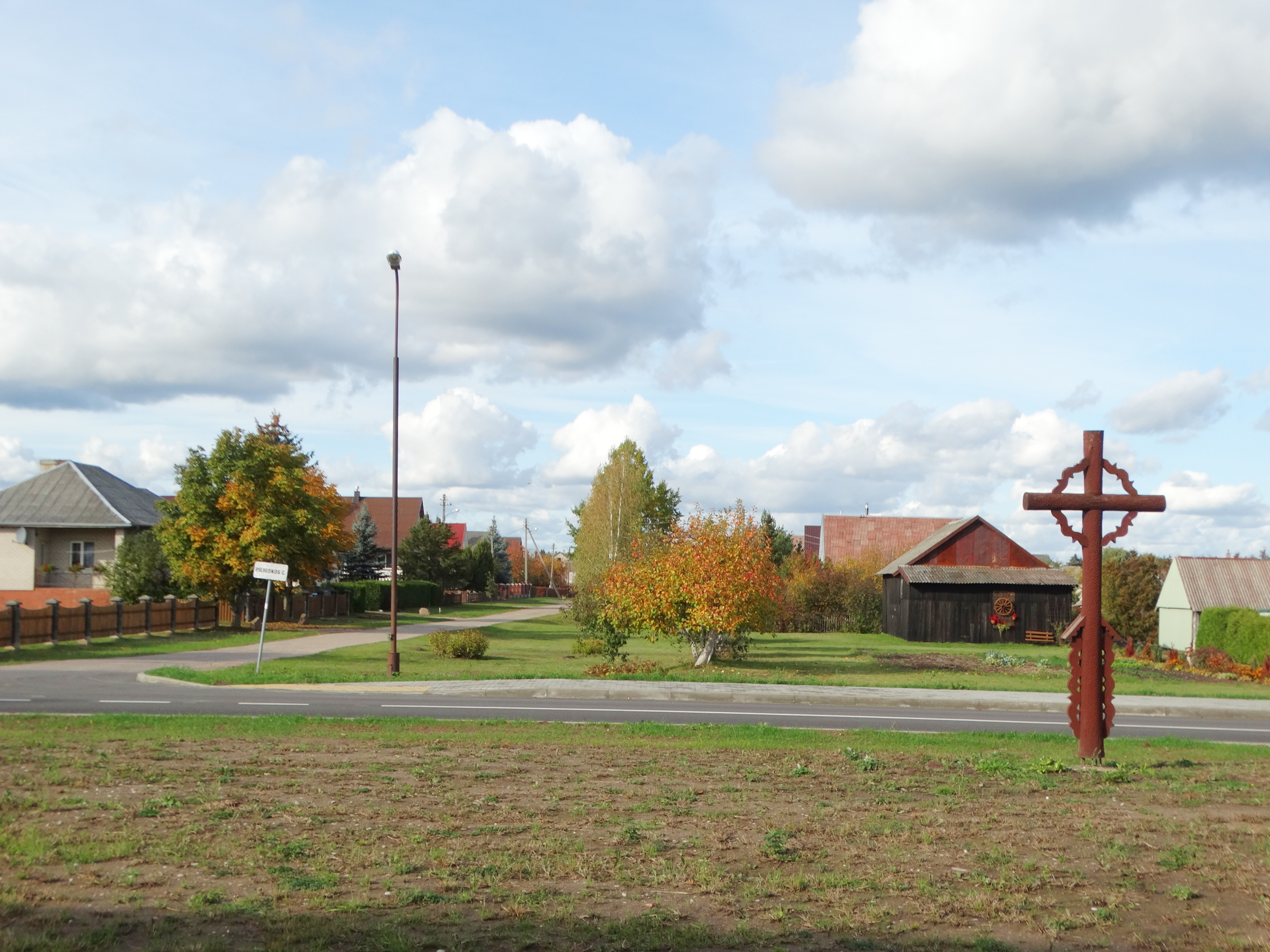
- Street Piliuona

- Location in Lithuania
- Coordinates: 54°46′52″N 24°07′26″E
- Country: Lithuania
- Ethnographic region: Suvalkija
- County: Kaunas County
- Municipality: Kaunas district municipality

Population (2021)
  - Total: 695
- Time zone: UTC+2 (EET)
  - Summer (DST): UTC+3 (EEST)

Piliuona is a village in Kaunas district municipality, in Kaunas County, in central Lithuania. According to the 2021 census, the village has a population of 695 people.
