= Vilkija Area Eldership =

Vilkija Area Eldership Vilkijos apylinkių seniūnija
- Eldership
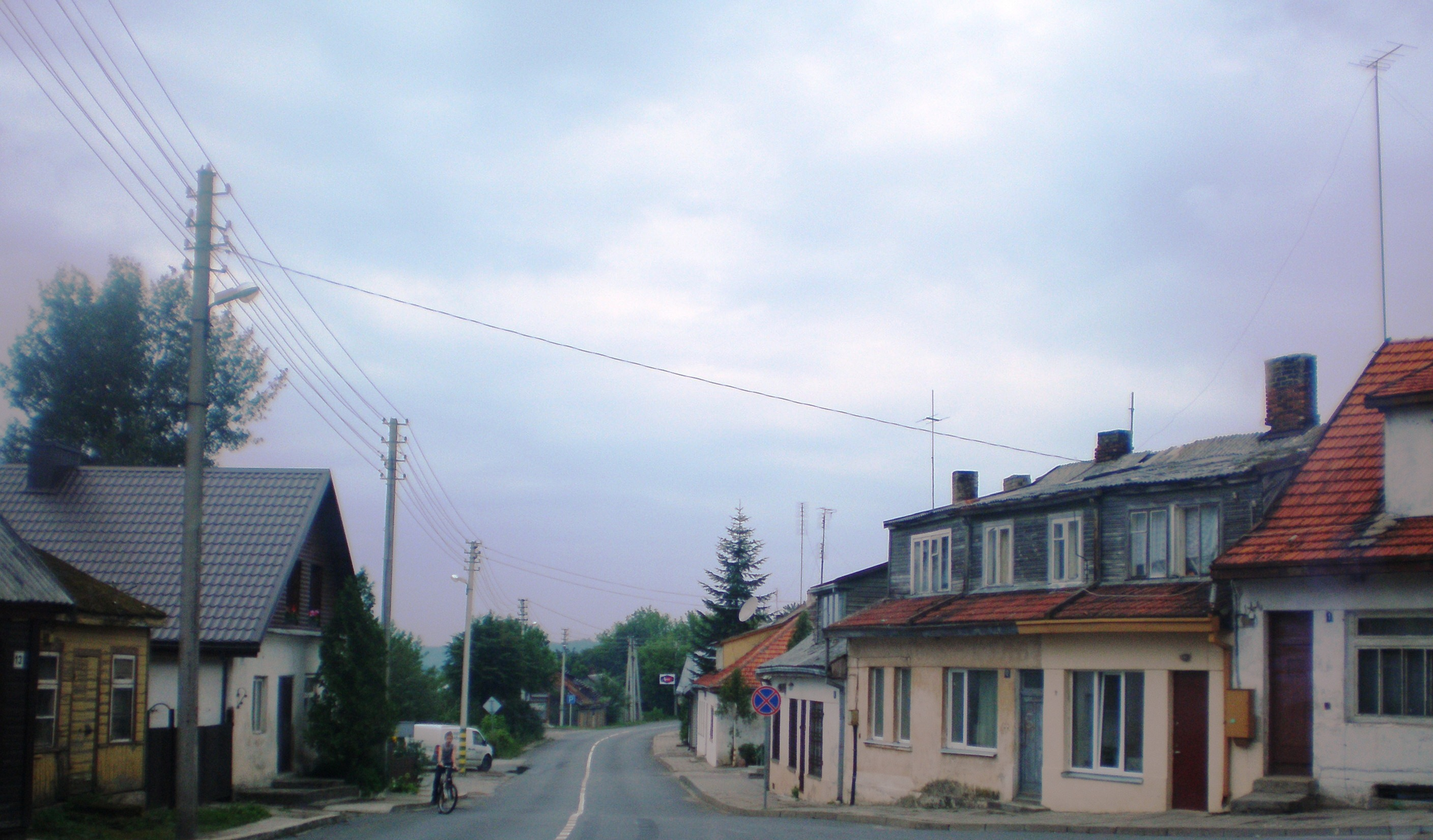
- Street in Vilkija

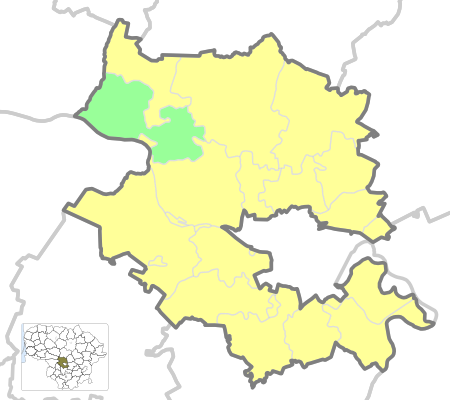
- Location of Vilkija Eldership
- Coordinates: 55.060°N 23.571°E
- Country: Lithuania
- Ethnographic region: Aukštaitija
- County: Kaunas County
- Municipality: Kaunas District Municipality
- Administrative centre: Vilkija

Area
  - Total: 149 km^{2} (58 sq mi)

Population (2021)
  - Total: 1,968
  - Density: 13.2/km^{2} (34.2/sq mi)
- Time zone: UTC+2 (EET)
  - Summer (DST): UTC+3 (EEST)

Vilkija Area Eldership (Lithuanian: Vilkijos apylinkių seniūnija) is a Lithuanian eldership, located in the northern part of Kaunas District Municipality.
