= Domeikava =

- Town
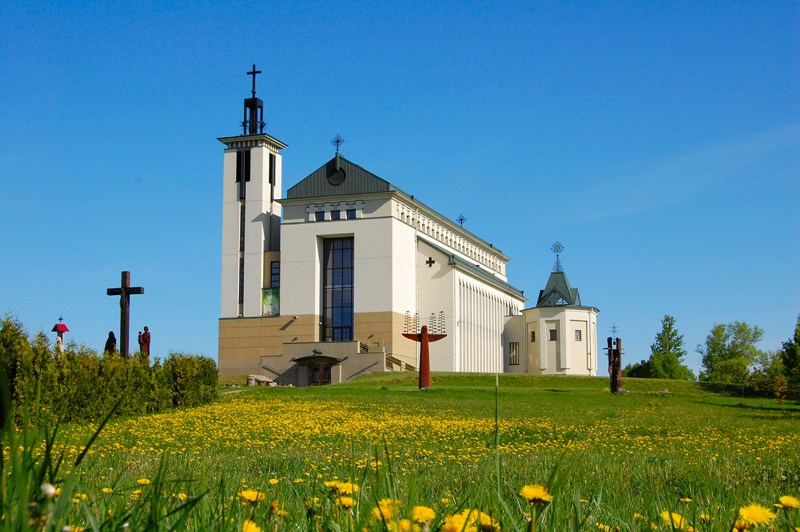

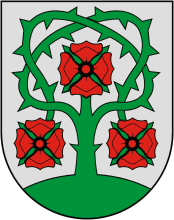
- Coat of arms

- Location of Domeikava
- Coordinates: 54°58′0″N 23°55′10″E
- Country: Lithuania
- Ethnographic region: Aukštaitija
- County: Kaunas County
- Municipality: Kaunas district municipality
- Eldership: Domeikava eldership
- Capital of: Domeikava eldership

Population (2021)
  - Total: 5,215
- Time zone: UTC+2 (EET)
  - Summer (DST): UTC+3 (EEST)

Domeikava is a town in the Kaunas district municipality, located 1 km (0.62 mi) north of Kaunas city municipality. The area surrounding Domeikava has some of Lithuania's most fertile and productive soil.

Domeikava's high school, Domeikavos Gimnazija, was established in the early 1920s. It is the primary high school in the area, serving students from all nearby towns. Another school, Kauno šv. Kazimiero progimnazija (primary and middle-school) is just outside Domeikava's town borders.

According to the 2011 census, the town had a population of 5,006 people. By 2017, Domeikava eldership reached a population of 8,820, the increase largely driven by construction of new houses and apartments which attract inhabitants from other areas.

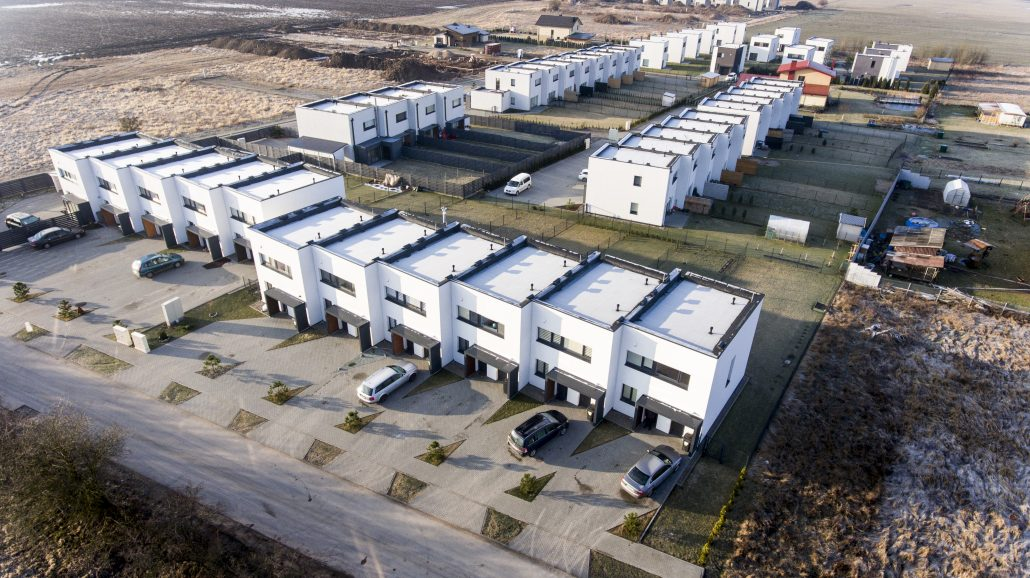
One of the new house complexes in Domeikava

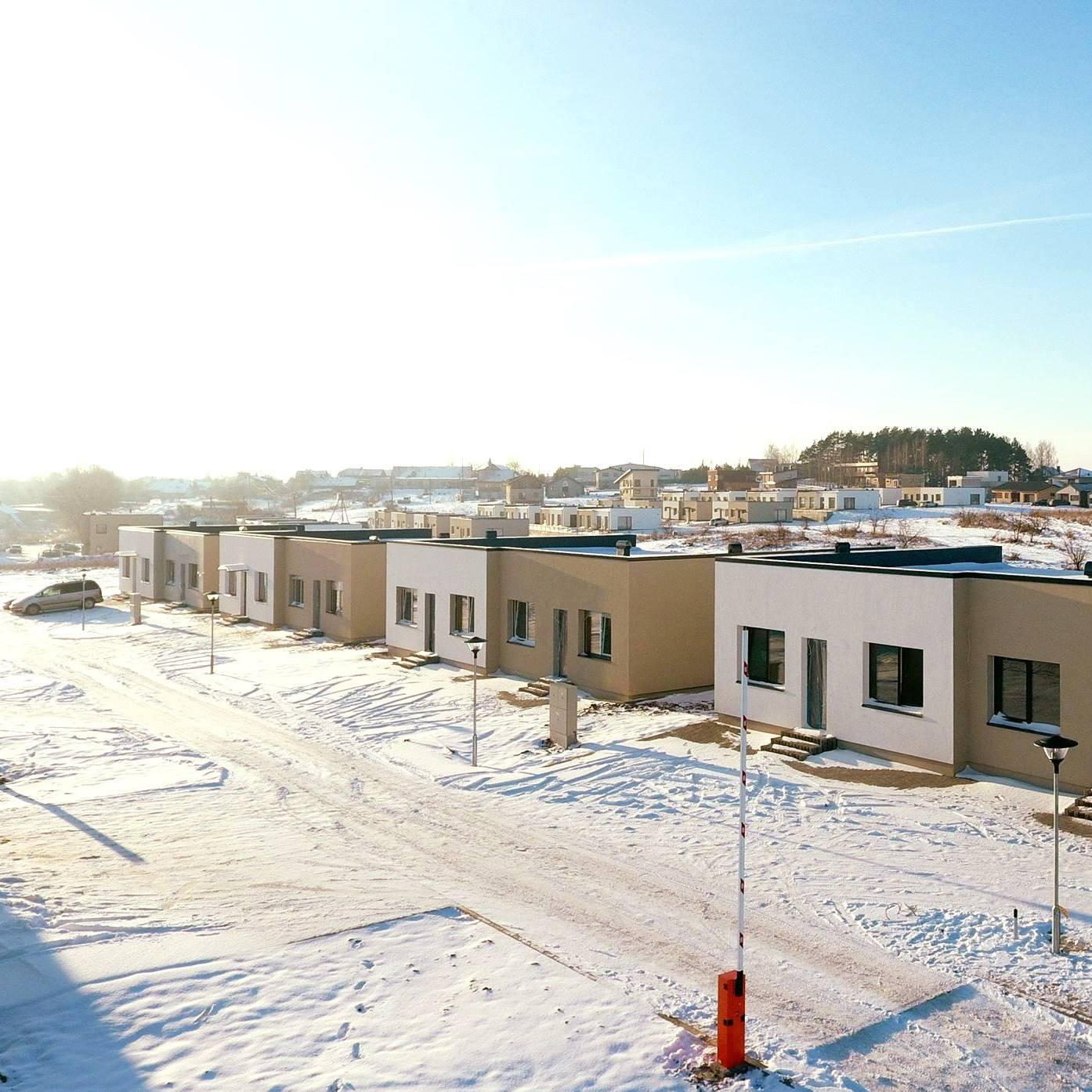
One of the new house complexes in Domeikava

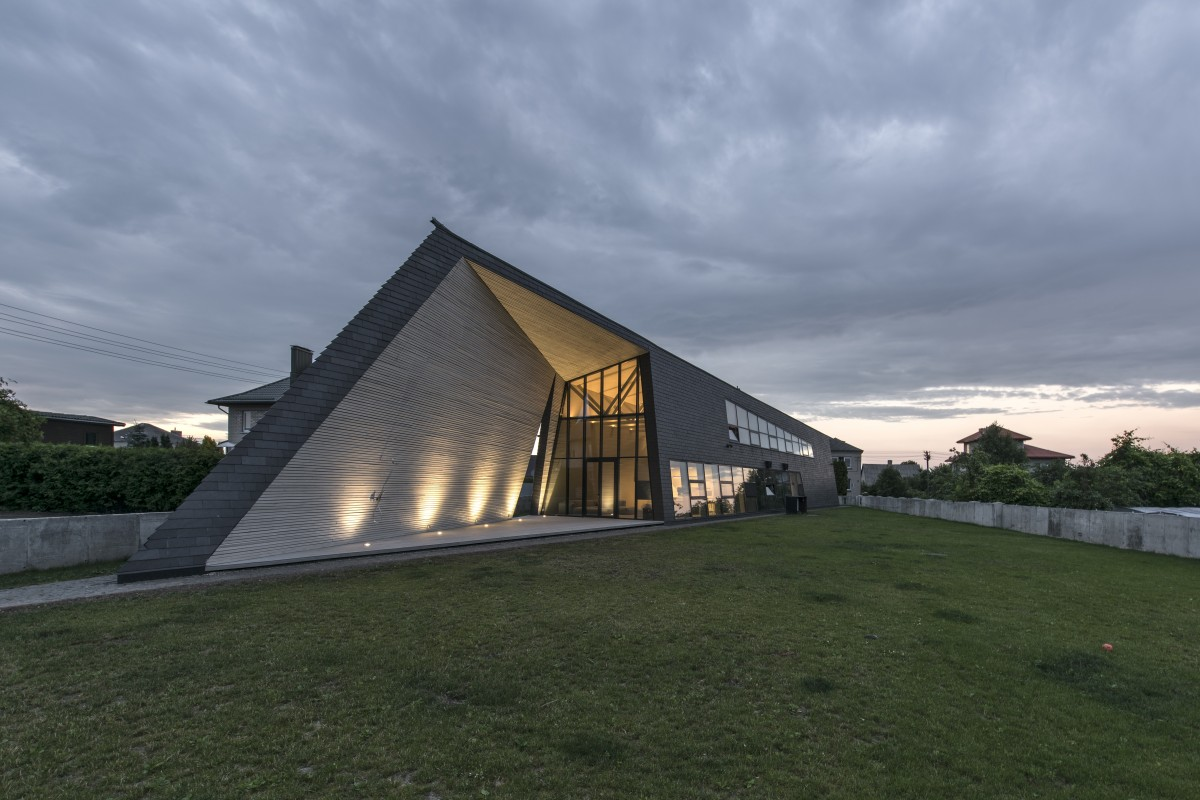
A family house in Domeikava, designed by architect Natkevičius
