= Ežerėlis =

- Town
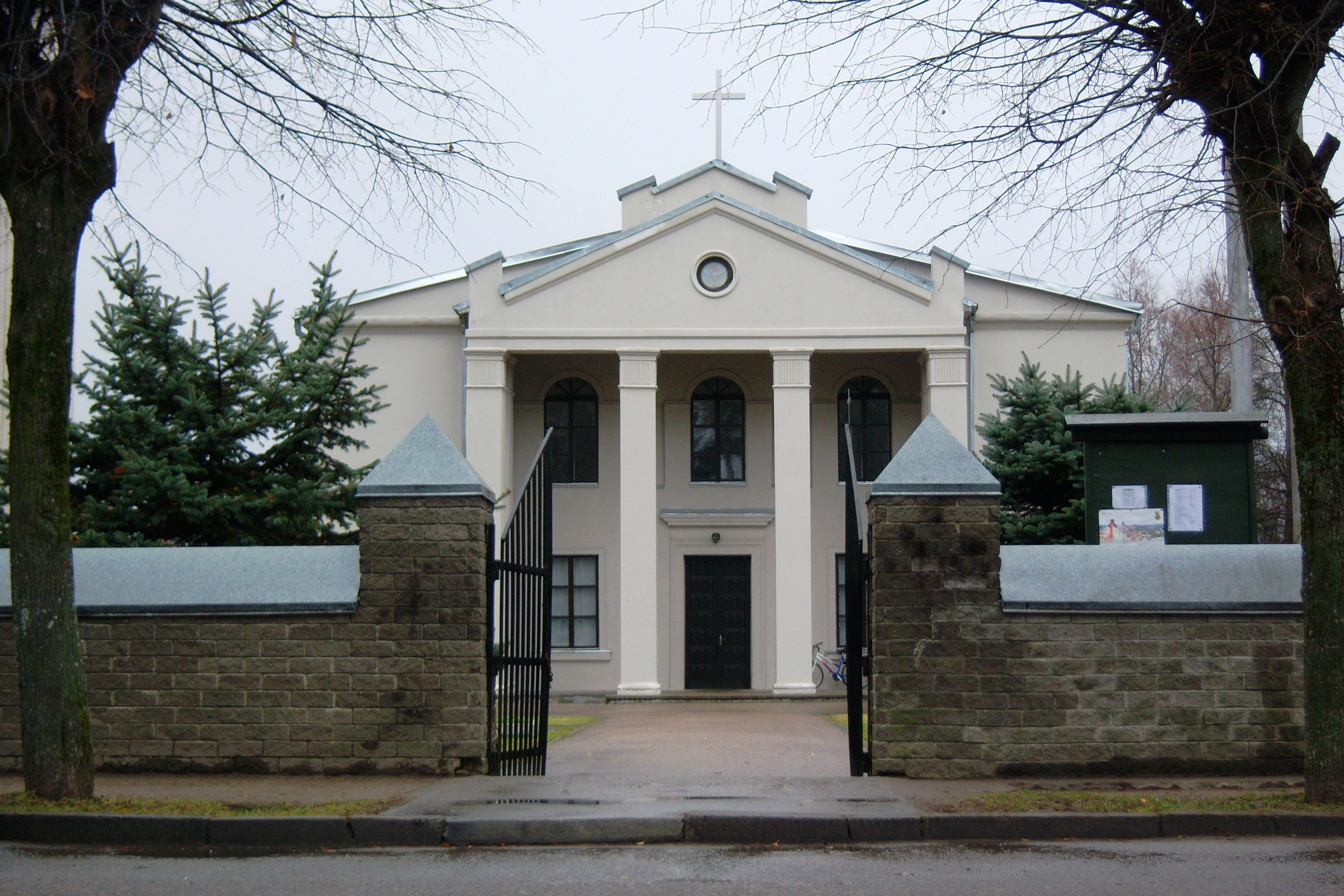
- Saint Anthony church

- Flag Coat of arms

- Location of Ežerėlis
- Coordinates: 54°53′0″N 23°37′0″E
- Country: Lithuania
- Ethnographic region: Suvalkija
- County: Kaunas County
- Municipality: Kaunas district municipality
- Eldership: Ežerėlis eldership
- Capital of: Ežerėlis eldership
- First mentioned: 1915
- Granted town rights: 1956

Population (2005)
  - Total: 2,066
- Time zone: UTC+2 (EET)
  - Summer (DST): UTC+3 (EEST)

Ežerėlis (literally: little lake) is a town in Kaunas County, Lithuania. It is located 15 km (9.3 mi) west of Kaunas city municipality.

It is a fairly new settlement as it started developing only in 1918 when a peat digging enterprise was established in the Ežerėlis Bog. According to the census of 1923, it had 132 residents. In 1959 the town reached the population of 2,200 and remained fairly stable since then.
