= Vandžiogala =

- Town
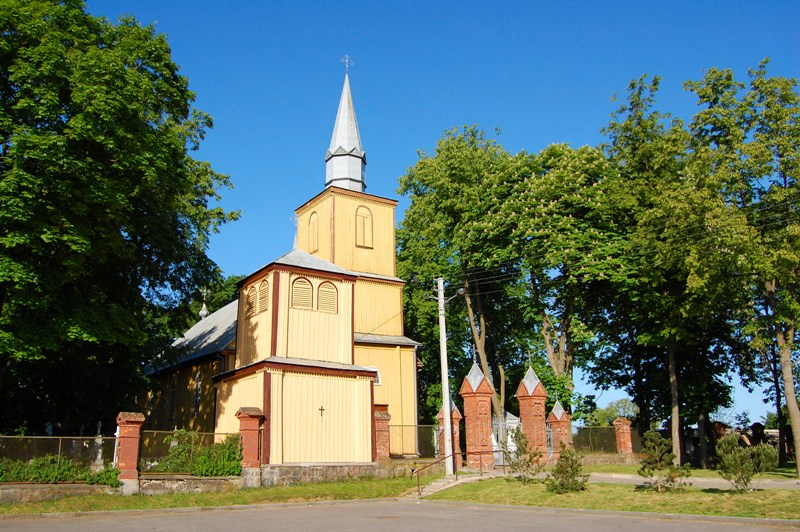

- Flag Coat of arms

- Location in Lithuania
- Coordinates: 55°07′10″N 23°57′40″E
- Country: Lithuania
- Ethnographic region: Aukštaitija
- County: Kaunas County

Population (2021)
  - Total: 736
- Time zone: UTC+2 (EET)
  - Summer (DST): UTC+3 (EEST)

Vandžiogala (Polish: Wędziagoła) is a small town in Kaunas County, Kaunas district municipality in central Lithuania. It is located 20 km (12 mi) north of Kaunas city municipality next to Urka brook. A Holy Trinity church was built in Vandžiogala in 1830.

A town also has a post office (LT-54073), a community centre building, a school, a library, two cemeteries. A wayside shrine was erected during the 135th commemoration of January Uprising.

As of 2011 it had a population of 861.

== History ==
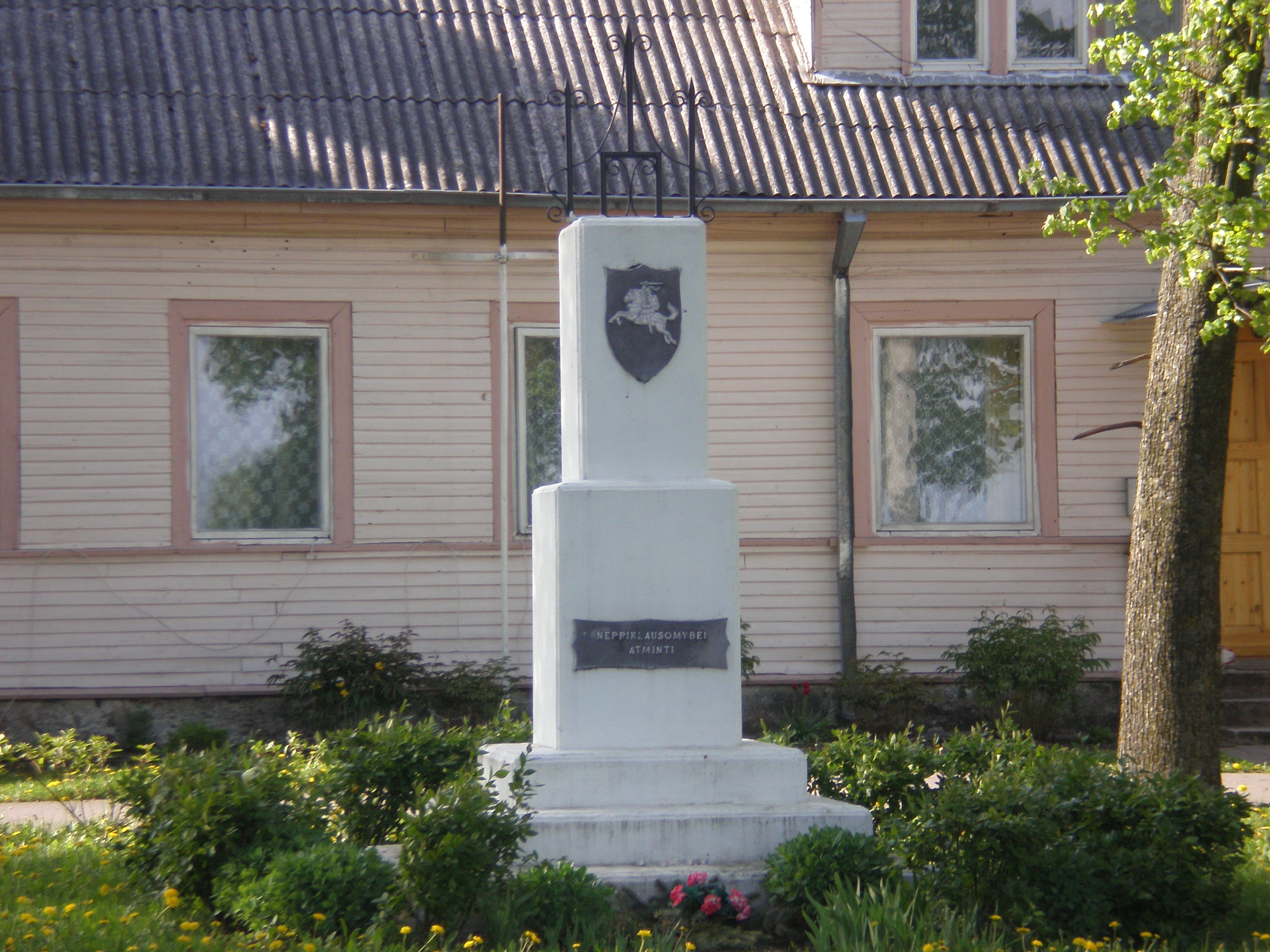
Monument for the commemoration of Lithuania's independence

Vandžiogala was first mentioned in written sources 1384 when a battle with Teutonic crusaders happened. In the chronicles it is written that Vice Komtur of Ragainė Markvard Schulbach was sent to Lithuania to support Vytautas against Skirgaila. The battle was won by Germans: 120 Lithuanians died instantly and the rest either ran away or were taken as prisoners. Komtur took 300 out of those captured and Vytautas took 200.

On July 9, 1941, the first large scale mass murder of the Jews in Kaunas district took place. Rollkommando Hamann massacred 38 people.

Before World War II, Vandžiogala had a significant percentage of inhabitants with Polish roots. As of 2020, still more than 40 people openly admit to having Polish ancestors.

== Etymology ==
The name is derived from words Vandys (a personal name) and galas meaning "the land belonging to Vandžiai". In the chronicles of crusaders the name is spelled Wandyagel while in the documents from the 16th century written in Old Church Slavonic it is spelled Vondziakgola.
