= Kaunas District Municipality =

Coordinates: 55°00′N 23°50′E

Kaunas District Municipality Kauno rajono savivaldybė
- Municipality
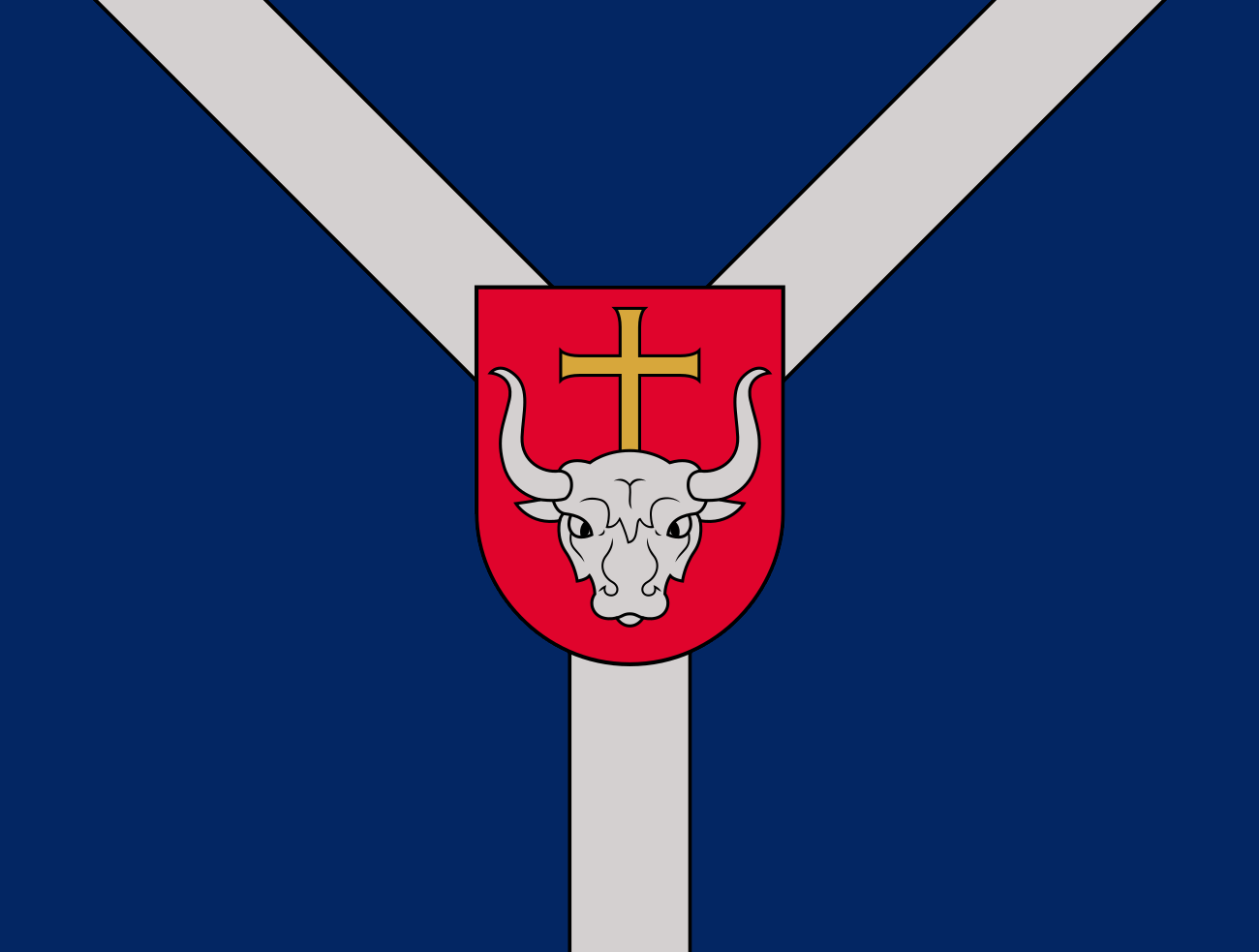
- Flag Coat of arms Brandmark

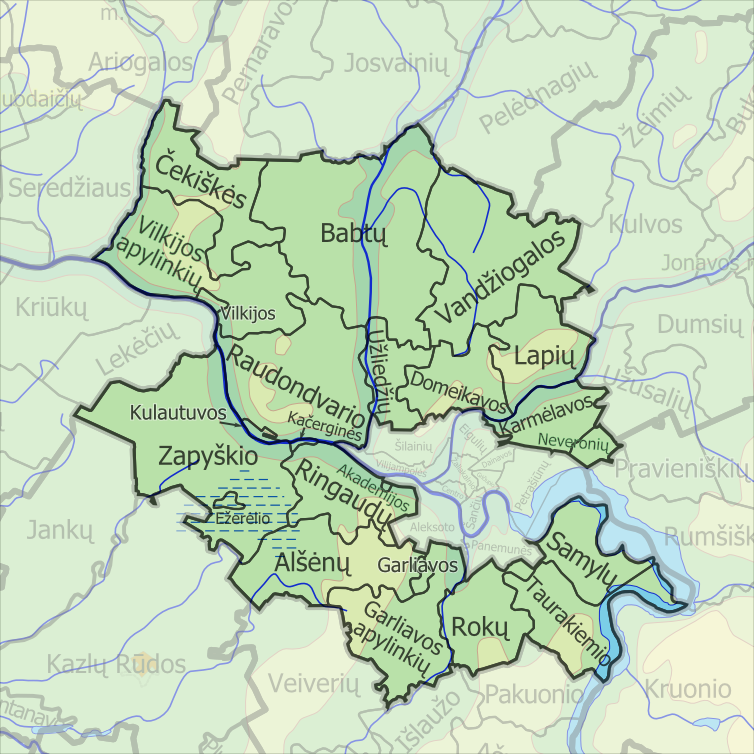
- Map of Kaunas district municipality
- Interactive map of Kaunas District Municipality
- Country: Lithuania
- Ethnographic region: Aukštaitija / Suvalkija
- County: Kaunas County
- Capital: Kaunas
- Elderships: 25

Area
  - Total: 1,496 km^{2} (578 sq mi)
  - Rank: 14th

Population (2023 census)
  - Total: 100,032
  - Rank: 7th
  - Density: 66.87/km^{2} (173.2/sq mi)
  - Rank: 13th
- Time zone: UTC+2 (EET)
  - Summer (DST): UTC+3 (EEST)
- Telephone code: 37
- Major settlements: Garliava (pop. 10,234); Domeikava (pop. 5,215); Raudondvaris (pop. 4,079)
- Website: www.krs.lt

Kaunas District Municipality (Kauno rajono savivaldybė) is one of 60 municipalities in Lithuania. The seat of the municipality is the city of Kaunas, which does not belong to the municipality but is a separate administrative unit. It surrounds the Kaunas City Municipality from the north, west and south, while in the east Kaunas district municipality borders Kaišiadorys District Municipality. Kaunas District Municipality has the second largest international airport in Lithuania (Kaunas International Airport), and is well connected by major roads (A1 highway and Via Baltica), as well as railways with other cities of Lithuania.

== Elderships ==
Kaunas District Municipality is divided into 25 elderships:

Eldership	Area	Population (2021)	Density per km^{2}
Akademija	4.6 km^{2} (1,136.68 acres; 1.78 sq mi)	2,928	637
Alšėnai Eldership	57 km^{2} (14,085.01 acres; 22.01 sq mi)	3,957	69
Babtai Eldership	143 km^{2} (35,336.07 acres; 55.21 sq mi)	3,851	27
Batniava Eldership	42.8 km^{2} (10,576.11 acres; 16.53 sq mi)	1,168	27
Čekiškė Eldership	83 km^{2} (20,509.75 acres; 32.05 sq mi)	1,417	17
Domeikava Eldership	58 km^{2} (14,332.11 acres; 22.39 sq mi)	9,134	157
Ežerėlis	2.3 km^{2} (568.34 acres; 0.89 sq mi)	1,640	713
Garliava Eldership (rural)	84 km^{2} (20,756.85 acres; 32.43 sq mi)	7,751	92
Garliava	3.7 km^{2} (914.29 acres; 1.43 sq mi)	10,366	2,802
Kačerginė	1.5 km^{2} (370.66 acres; 0.58 sq mi)	739	493
Karmėlava Eldership	40 km^{2} (9,884.22 acres; 15.44 sq mi)	6,265	157
Kulautuva	2.8 km^{2} (691.90 acres; 1.08 sq mi)	1,393	498
Lapės Eldership	62 km^{2} (15,320.53 acres; 23.94 sq mi)	3,547	57
Linksmakalnis	2.9 km^{2} (716.61 acres; 1.12 sq mi)	634	219
Neveronys	13 km^{2} (3,212.37 acres; 5.02 sq mi)	3,094	238
Raudondvaris Eldership	105 km^{2} (25,946.07 acres; 40.54 sq mi)	5,642	54
Ringaudai Eldership	59 km^{2} (14,579.22 acres; 22.78 sq mi)	7,892	134
Rokai Eldership	42 km^{2} (10,378.43 acres; 16.22 sq mi)	894	21
Samylai Eldership	76 km^{2} (18,780.01 acres; 29.34 sq mi)	4,452	59
Taurakiemis Eldership	53 km^{2} (13,096.59 acres; 20.46 sq mi)	1,661	31
Užliedžiai Eldership	34 km^{2} (8,401.58 acres; 13.13 sq mi)	6,481	191
Vandžiogala Eldership	126 km^{2} (31,135.28 acres; 48.65 sq mi)	1,335	11
Vilkija Eldership (rural)	149 km^{2} (36,818.70 acres; 57.53 sq mi)	1,968	13
Vilkija	2.7 km^{2} (667.18 acres; 1.04 sq mi)	1,762	653
Zapyškis Eldership	149 km^{2} (36,818.70 acres; 57.53 sq mi)	2,429	16

== Geography ==
=== Nature ===
The rivers Neman (Lithuanian: Nemunas), Neris, Nevėžis, Jiesia and Dubysa pass through the Kaunas District area. Kaunas Reservoir borders the east side of the district. It also has 7 lakes and 14 ponds in the area.

The largest forests are: Dubrava, Padauguva, Varluva, Zapyškis. Girionys Park is home to some rare and exotic plant life. Žalgiris memorial park is located at Cinkiškė village.

=== Mounds ===
There are a total of 20 nationally recognized mounds located in Kaunas District Municipality area. More notable mounds are:

- Piepaliai mound
- Lantainiai mound
- Bernatoniai mound
- Pypliai mound
- Samylai mound
- Pakalniškiai mound
- Guogai mound
- Ringovė mound
- Jaučakiai mound
- Altoniškiai mound
- Jadagoniai mound

=== Preserves ===
Kaunas District has a large number of nature reserves. Including:

- Arlaviškės botanical preserve
- Dubrava reserve area
- Kamša botanical-zoological preserve
- Kaunas Reservoir Regional Park
- Nevėžis landscape preserve

== Settlements ==
Kaunas District Municipality consists of:

- 3 cities - Ežerėlis, Garliava, Vilkija
- 10 towns - Akademija, Babtai, Čekiškė, Domeikava, Kačerginė, Kulautuva, Garliava, Domeikava and Vandžiogala
- 370 villages

== Culture ==
An ethnic culture and crafts museum can be found in Vilkija, Babtai has a museum of ethnography and in Saliai there is an underground press museum. Among other noteworthy places are a racing circuit in Kačerginė called Nemuno žiedas, also a total of 19 surviving manors (the most famous are Raudondvaris, and Babtynas located in Žemaitkiemis), the old church of Zapyškis (Church of St. John the Baptist) and Monastery of Discalced Carmelites in Paštuva.
