= Išlaužas Eldership =

Eldership of Lithuania

The Išlaužas Eldership (Lithuanian: Išlaužo seniūnija) is an eldership of Lithuania, located in the Prienai District Municipality. In 2021 its population was 1566.
