= Church of the Blessed Virgin Mary of the Rosary, Balbieriškis =

Church in Suvalkija Region, Lithuania

Church of the Blessed Virgin Mary of the Rosary
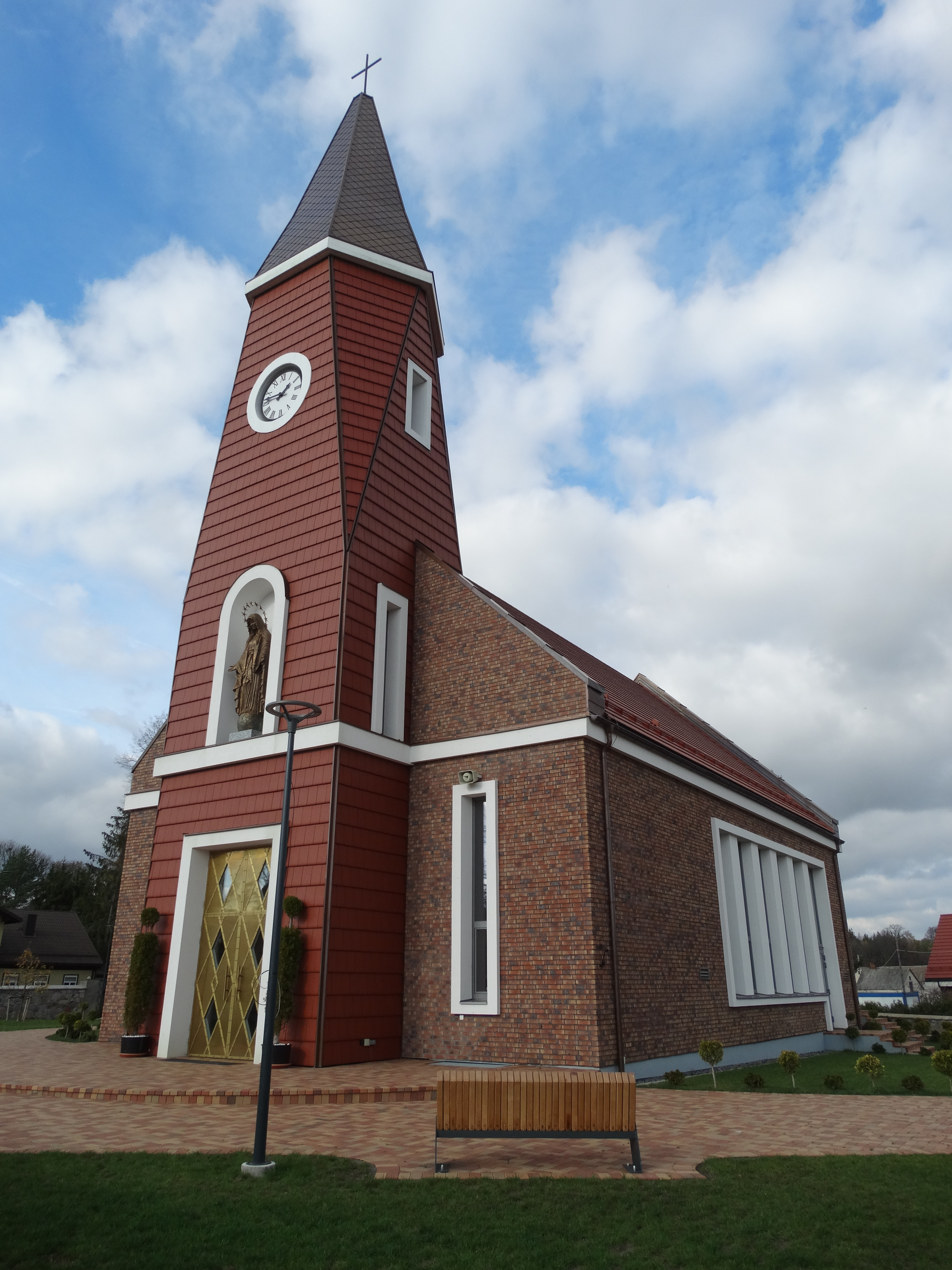
- Church after reconstruction

- Location within Lithuania
- 54°31′33″N 23°53′6″E
- Location: Balbieriškis, Prienai District Municipality, Kaunas County
- Country: Lithuania
- Denomination: Roman Catholic

History
- Consecrated: March 3, 2018

Architecture
- Architect: Vilius Urbonas

Specifications
- Materials: Brick

Administration
- Diocese: Vilkaviškis
- Deanery: Prienai
- Parish: Balbieriškis Parish of the Blessed Virgin Mary of the Rosary

Church of the Blessed Virgin Mary of the Rosary is located in the north part of the town of Balbieriškis, Lithuania, 13 kilometres (8 mi) to the south of Prienai.

== History ==
The first church was built before 1520. In 1612, the second church was constructed and the owner of Balbieriškis Manor gave it to the Calvinists. Catholics, led by pastor of Merkinė, Petras Ramulavičius, took the church on February 10, 1632. In 1884–1888, a wooden church was built following the design of Bronisław Żochowski. Pastor Motiejus Brazauskas oversaw the reconstruction of the church in 1911–1912.

The church sustained damage during World War II and serious reconstruction was made in 1956, including replacing beams of the towers.

On the night of August 8, 2013, the church burnt down.

== Rebuilding of the church ==
In 2015, architect Vilius Urbonas presented design of the new church to the community of Balbieriškis. The new design had single tower and used bricks as the main building material. The church was consecrated on March 3, 2018.

Arvydas Paukštys, the founder and the owner of IoT company Teltonika, donated one million euros to the rebuilding of the church, becoming the first person in Lithuania to be named national patron.

== Gallery ==
=== Old church ===
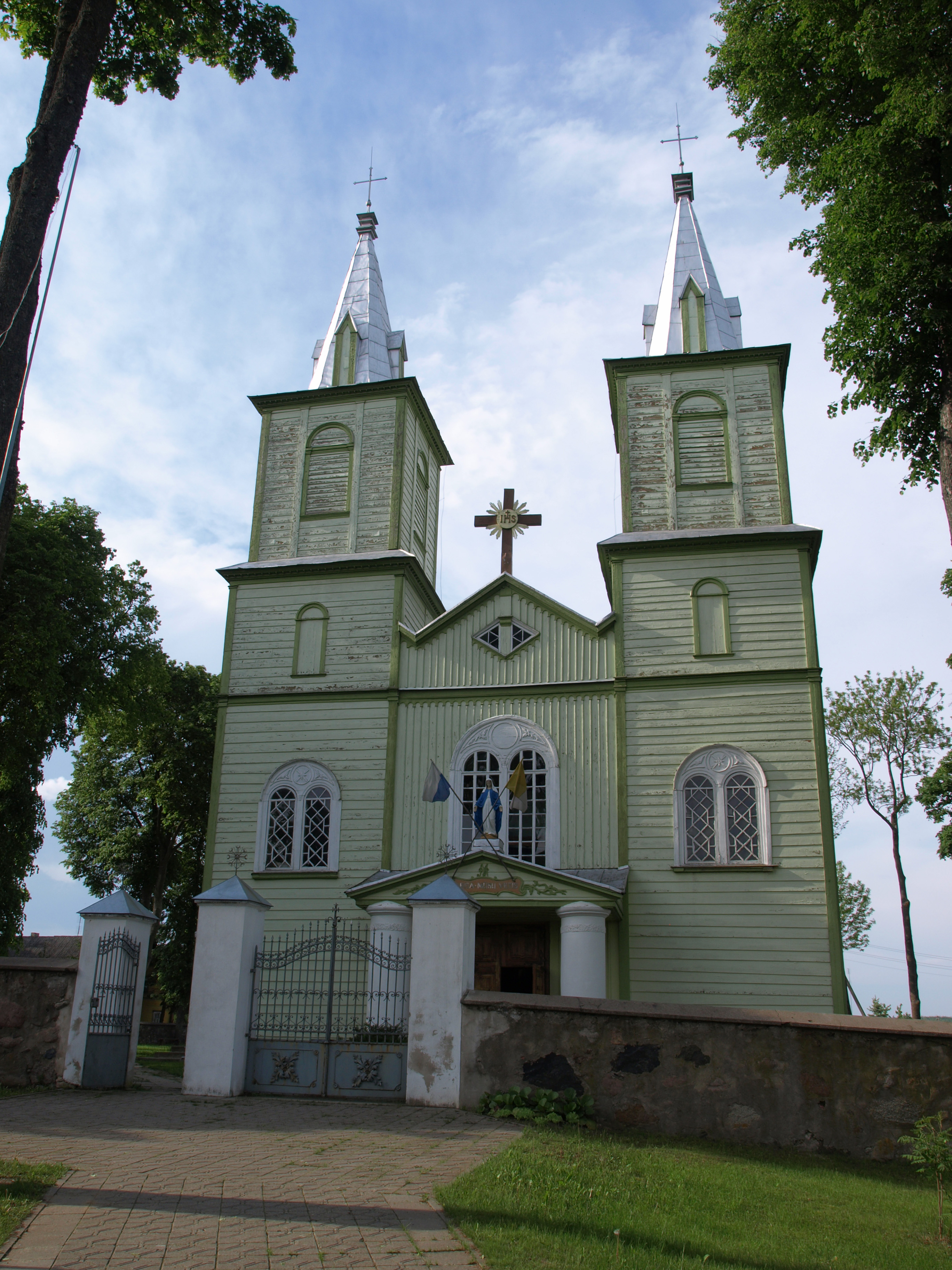
Front view

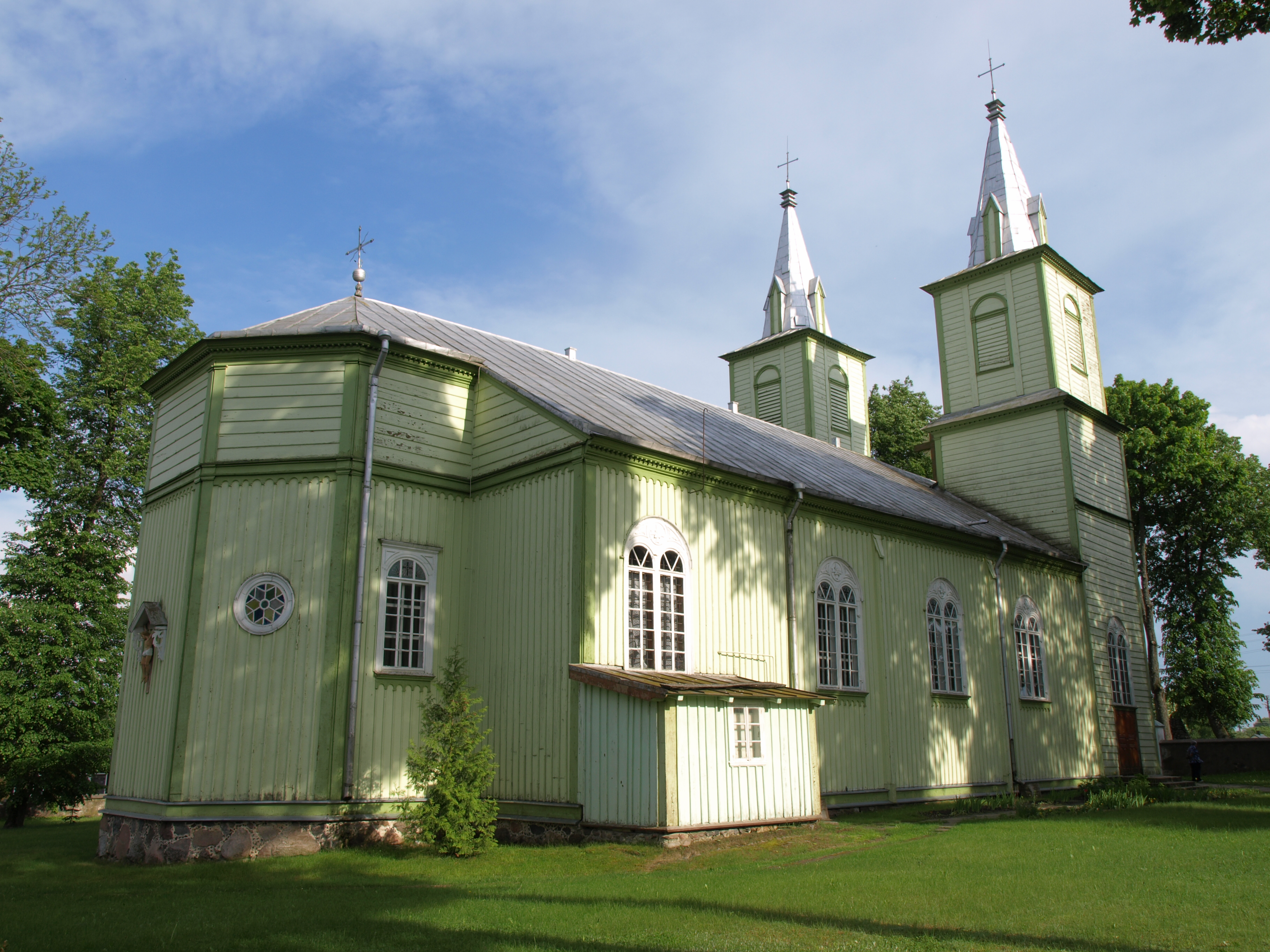
Back view

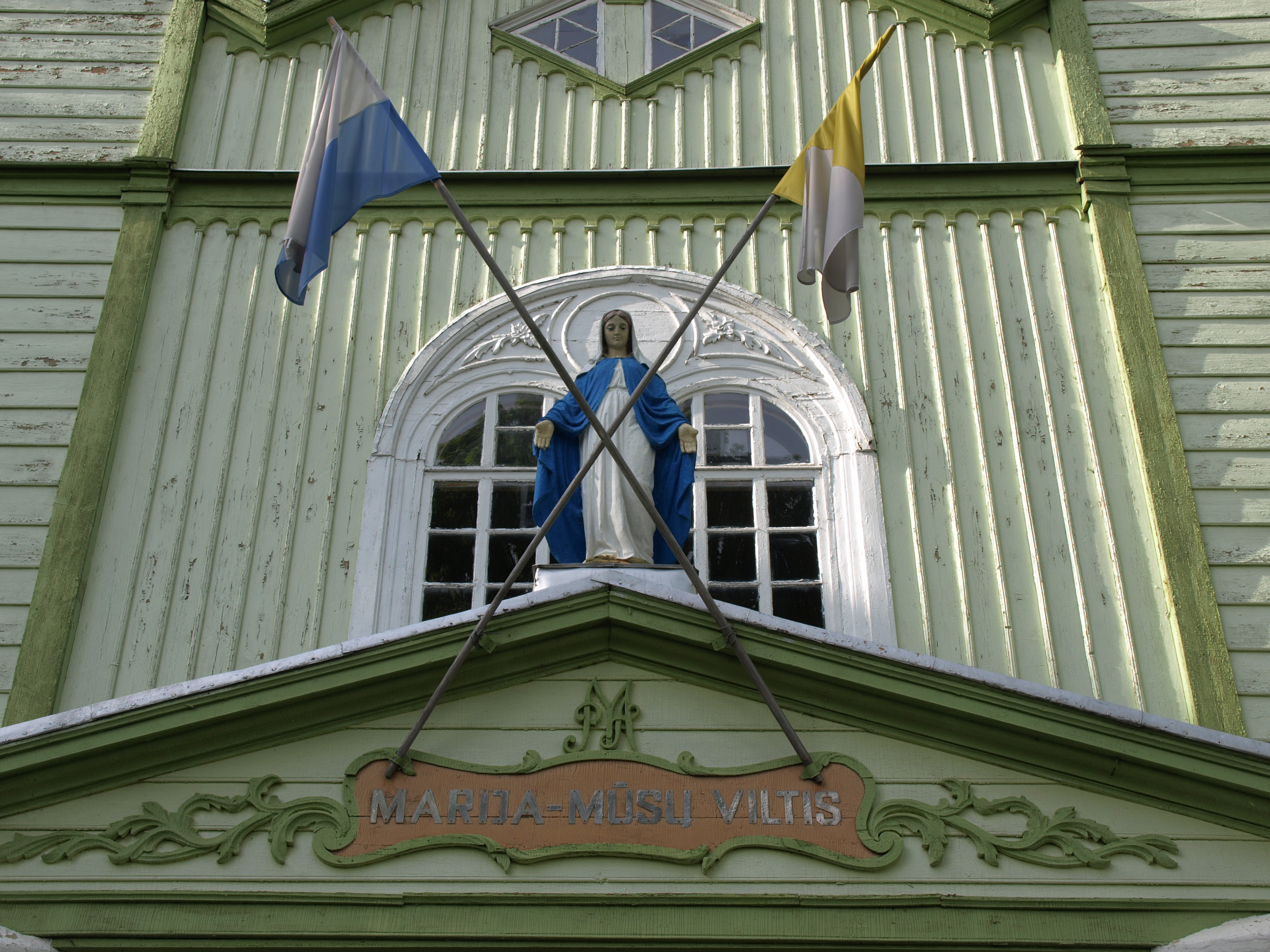
Sculpture of Blessed Virgin Mary above entrance

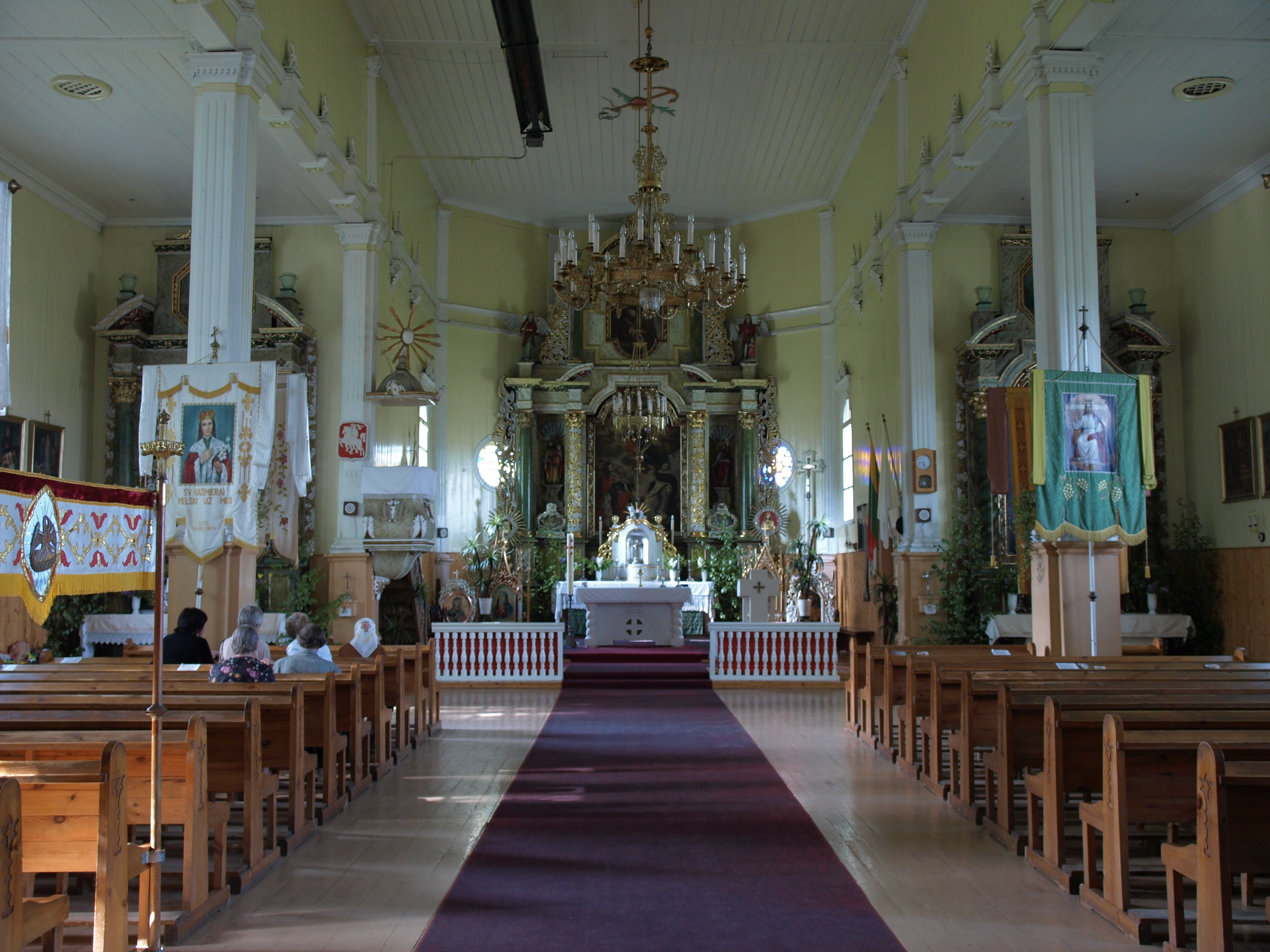
Inside of the church

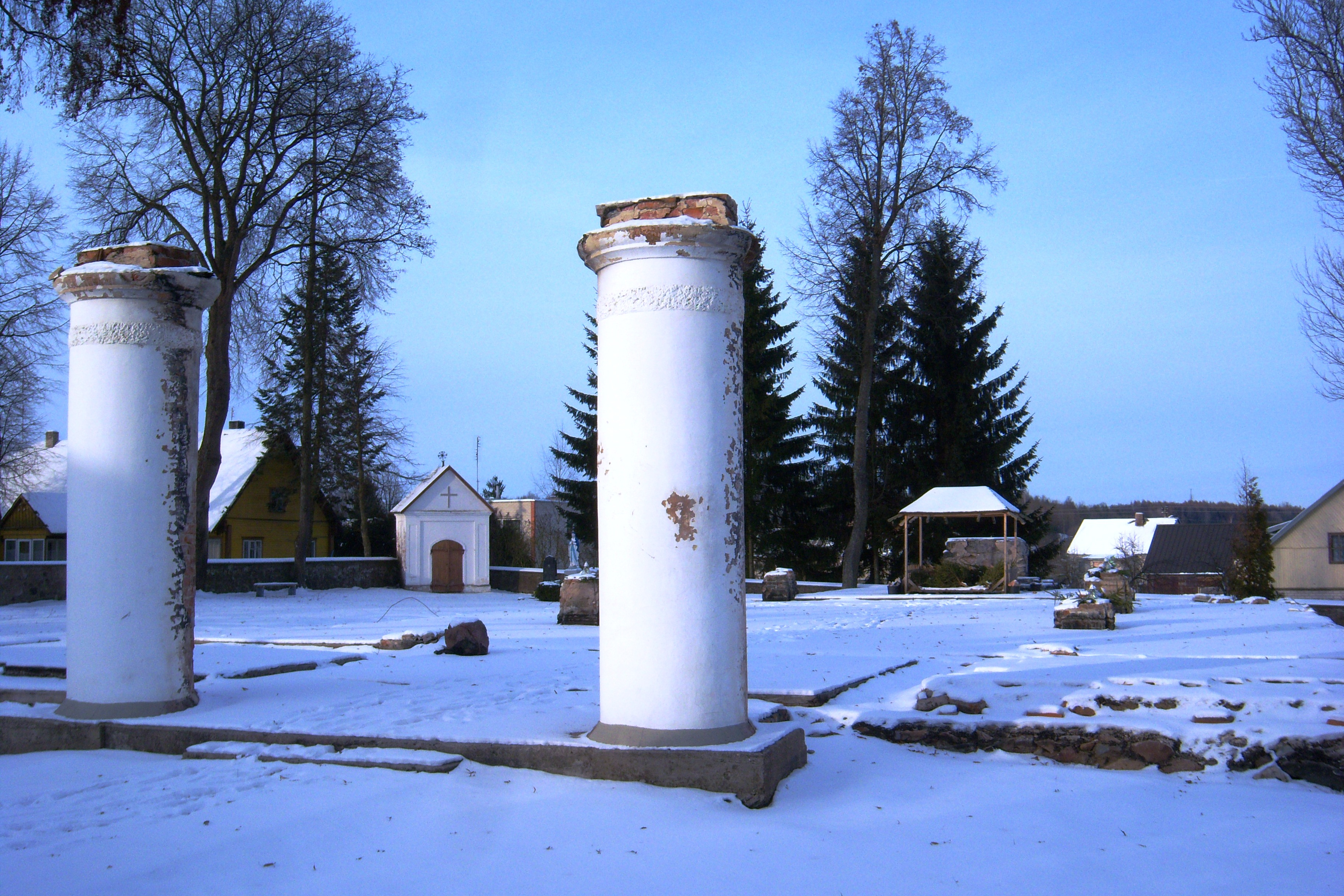
After the fire, January 2014

=== Current church ===
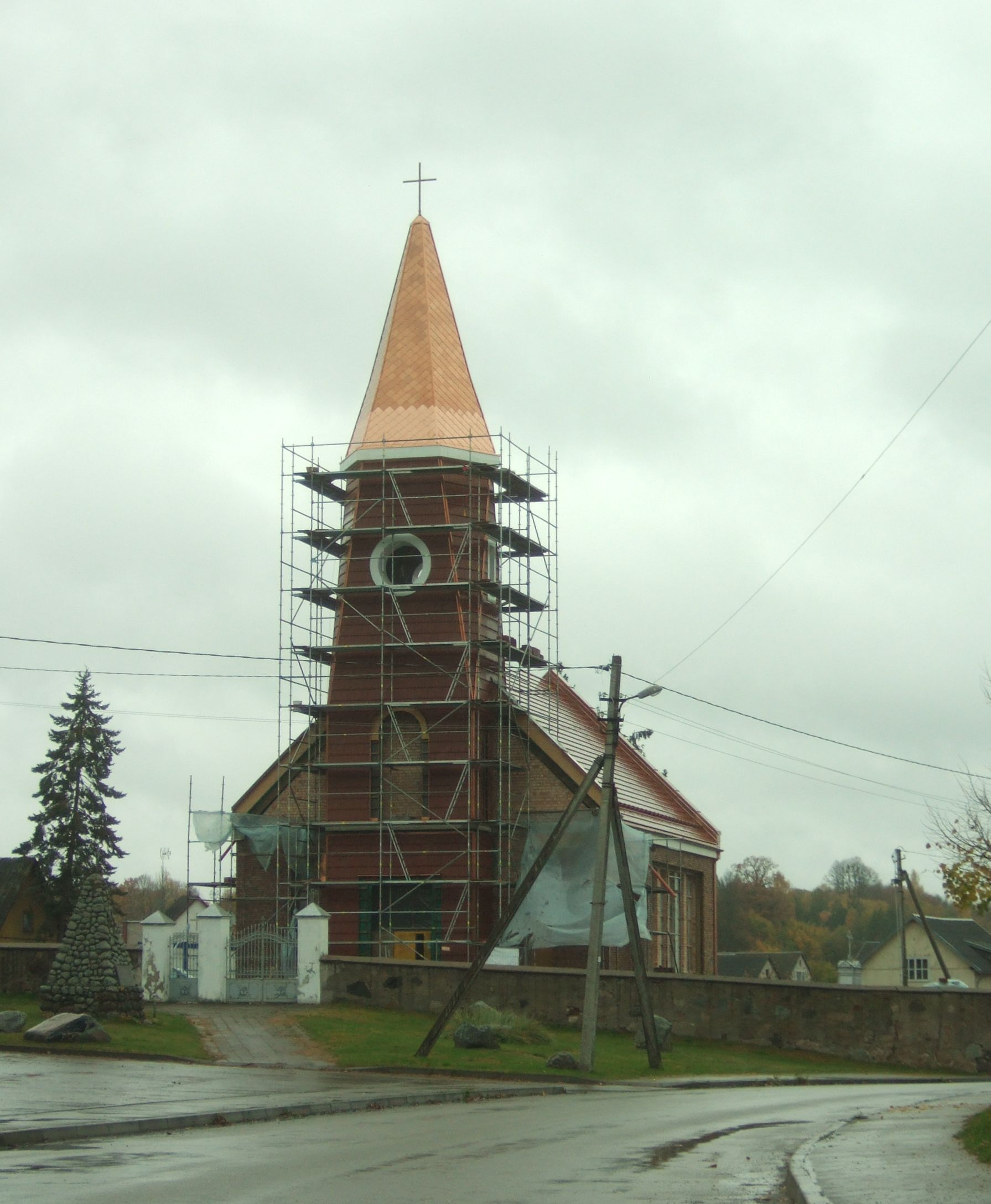
Construction of the church, October 2017

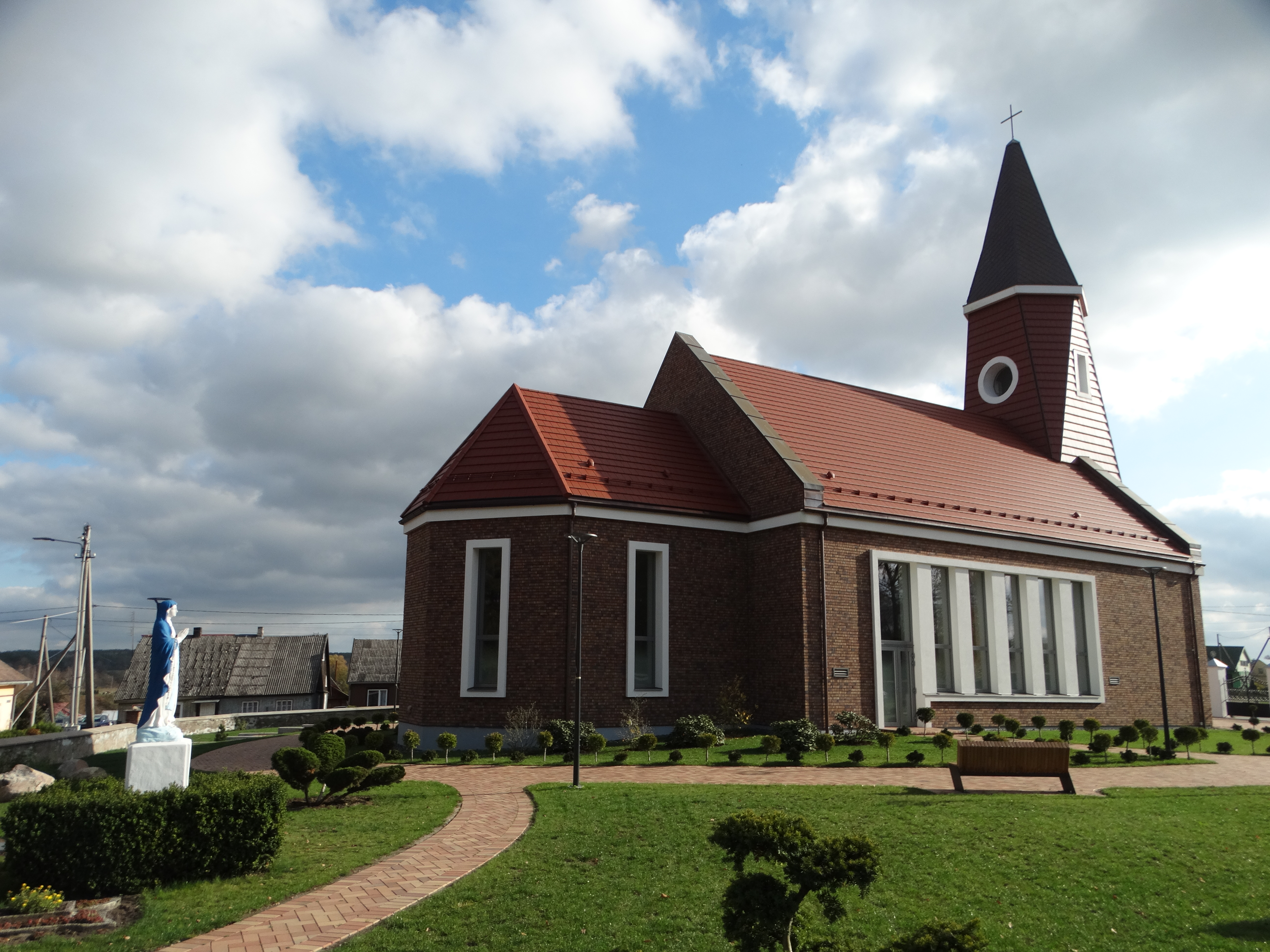
Balbieriškis church

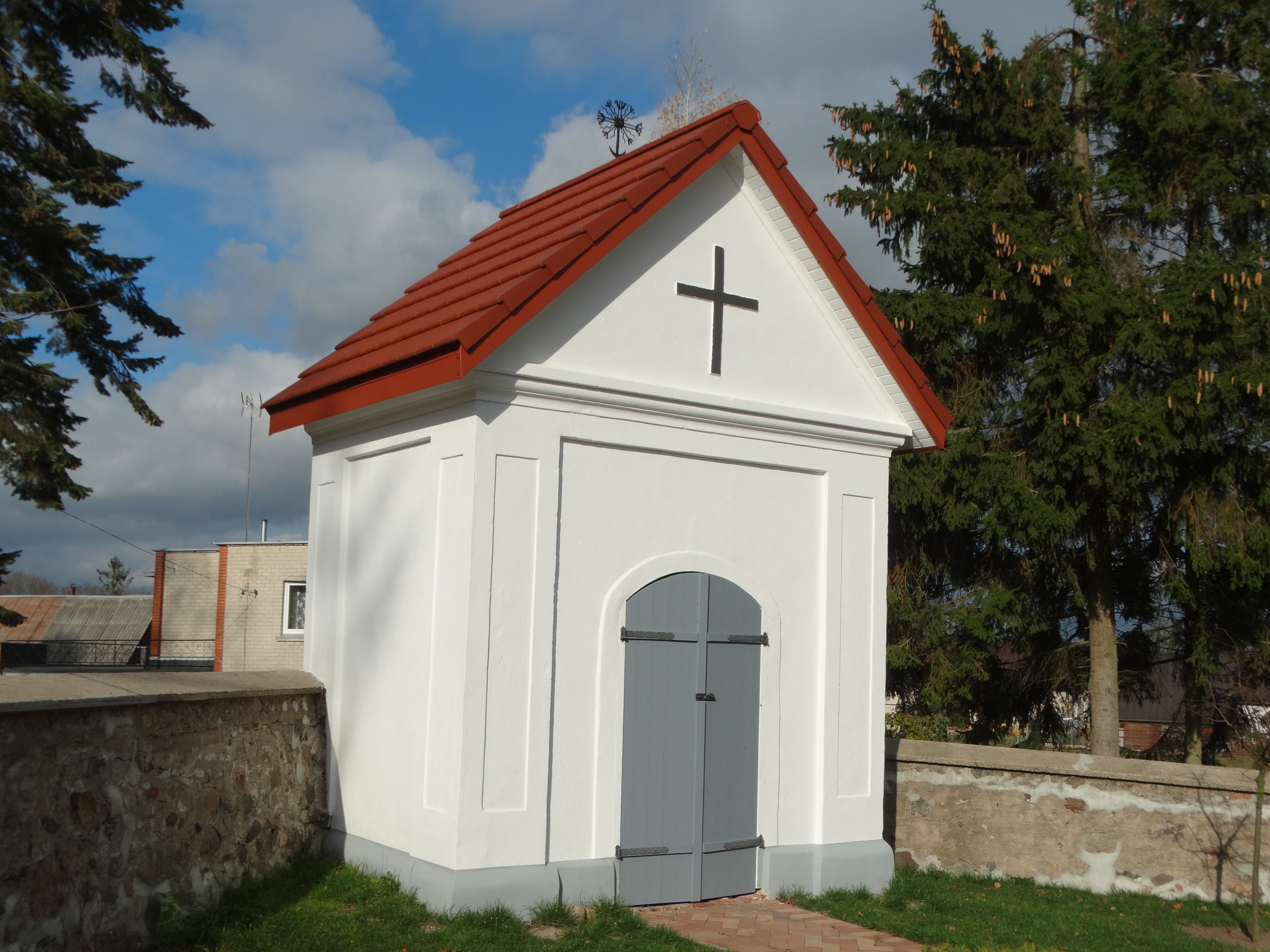
Renewed chapel

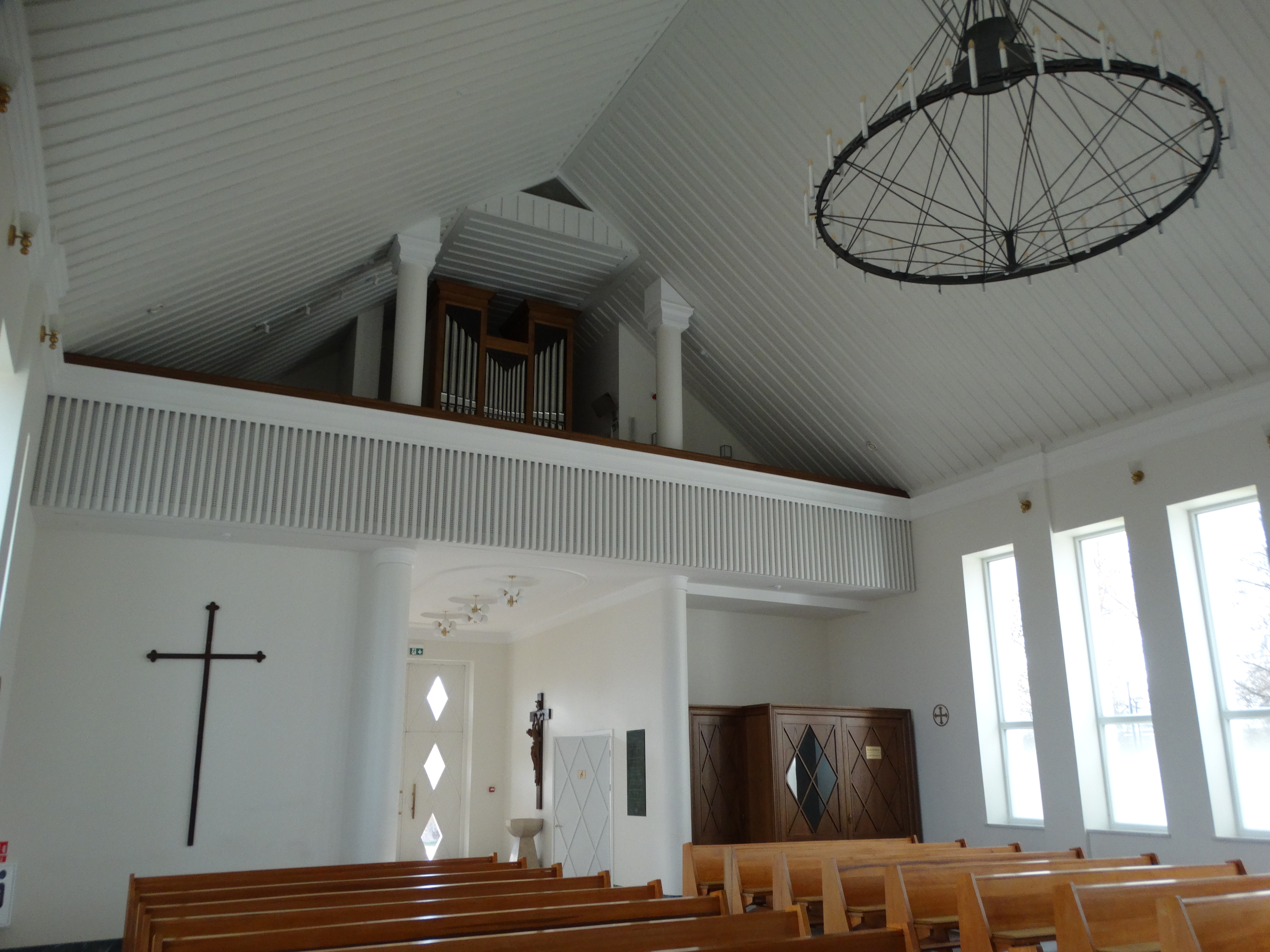
Organ
