= Zapyškis Eldership =

Zapyškis Eldership Zapyškio seniūnija
- Eldership
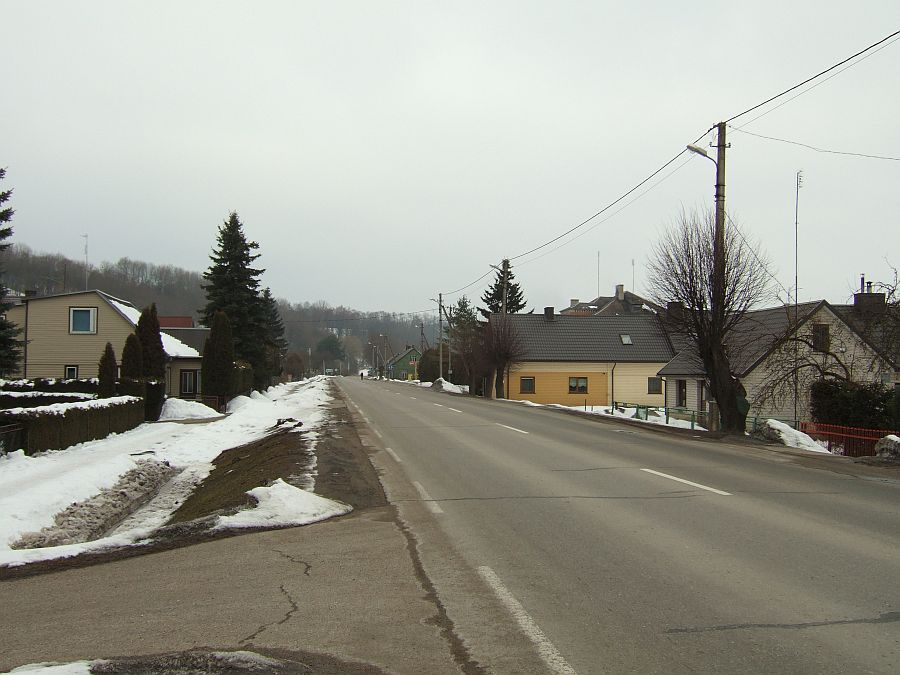
- Street in Zapyškis

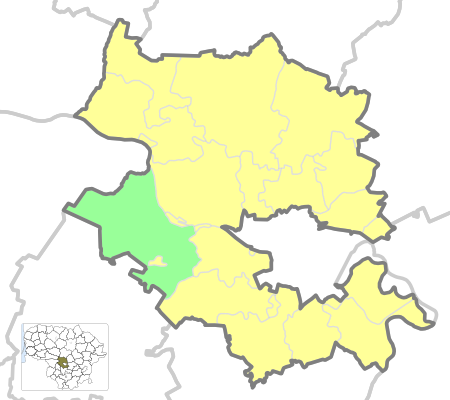
- Location of Zapyškis Eldership
- Coordinates: 54.924°N 23.567°E
- Country: Lithuania
- Ethnographic region: Suvalkija
- County: Kaunas County
- Municipality: Kaunas District Municipality
- Administrative centre: Kluoniškiai

Area
  - Total: 149 km^{2} (58 sq mi)

Population (2021)
  - Total: 2,429
  - Density: 16.3/km^{2} (42.2/sq mi)
- Time zone: UTC+2 (EET)
  - Summer (DST): UTC+3 (EEST)

Zapyškis Eldership (Lithuanian: Zapyškio seniūnija) is a Lithuanian eldership, located in the western part of Kaunas District Municipality.
