= Alšėnai Eldership =

Alšėnai Eldership Alšėnų seniūnija
- Eldership
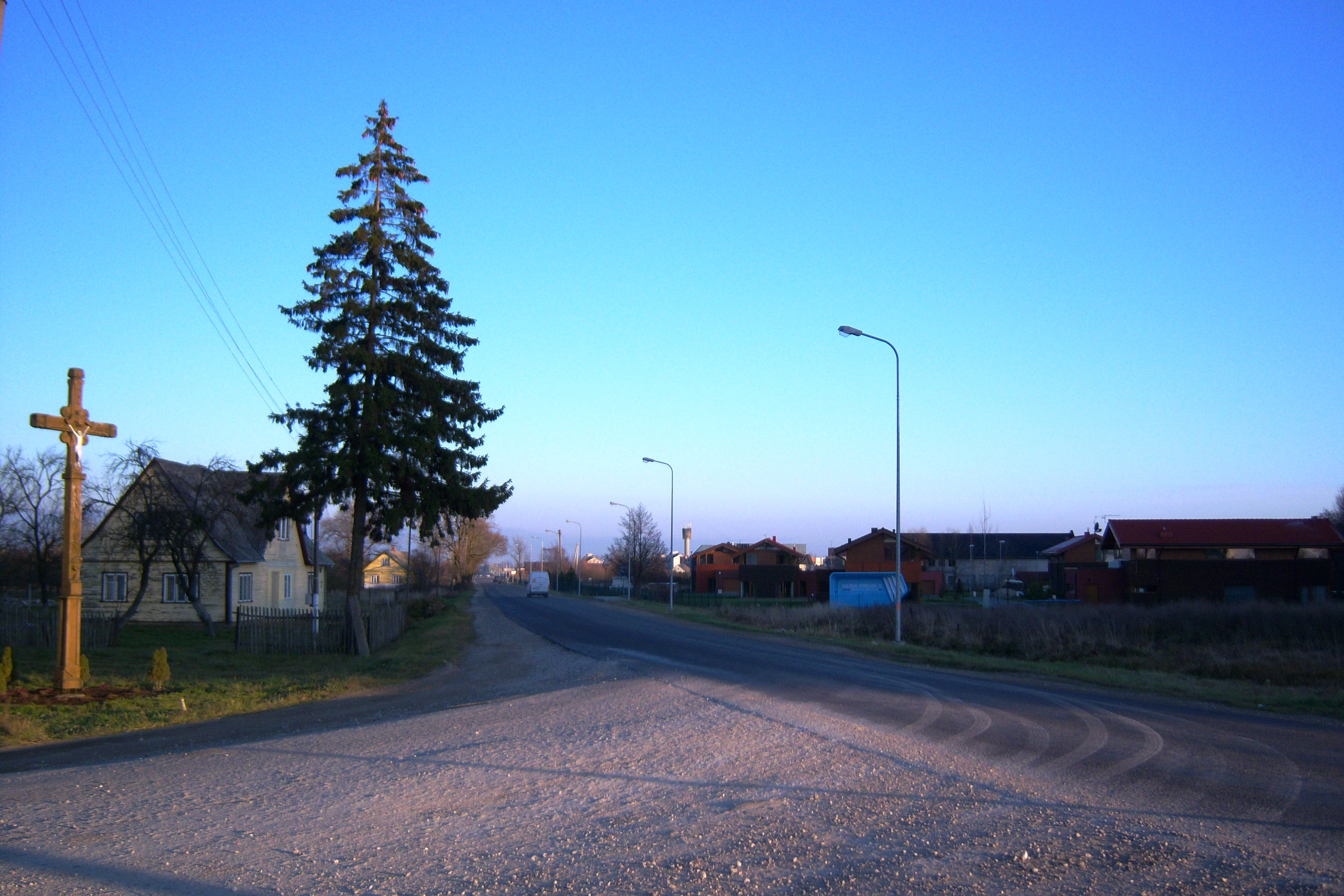
- Street in Mastaičiai

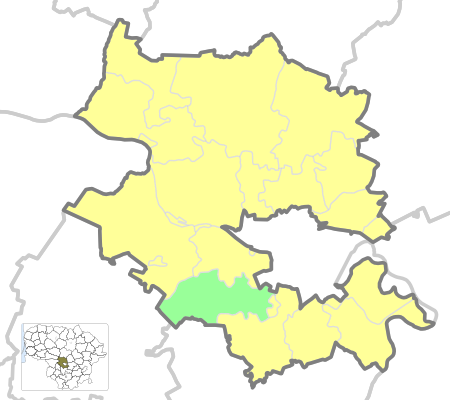
- Location of Alšėnai Eldership
- Coordinates: 54.838°N 23.746°E
- Country: Lithuania
- Ethnographic region: Suvalkija
- County: Kaunas County
- Municipality: Kaunas District Municipality
- Administrative centre: Mastaičiai

Area
  - Total: 57 km^{2} (22 sq mi)

Population (2021)
  - Total: 3,957
  - Density: 69/km^{2} (180/sq mi)
- Time zone: UTC+2 (EET)
  - Summer (DST): UTC+3 (EEST)

Alšėnai Eldership (Lithuanian: Alšėnų seniūnija) is a Lithuanian eldership, located in the southern part of Kaunas District Municipality.
