= Pakuonis Eldership =

Eldership of Lithuania

The Pakuonis Eldership (Lithuanian: Pakuonio seniūnija) is an eldership of Lithuania, located in the Prienai District Municipality. As of 2021, its population was 1508.
