= Balbieriškis =

Town in Suvalkija Region, Lithuania

- Town
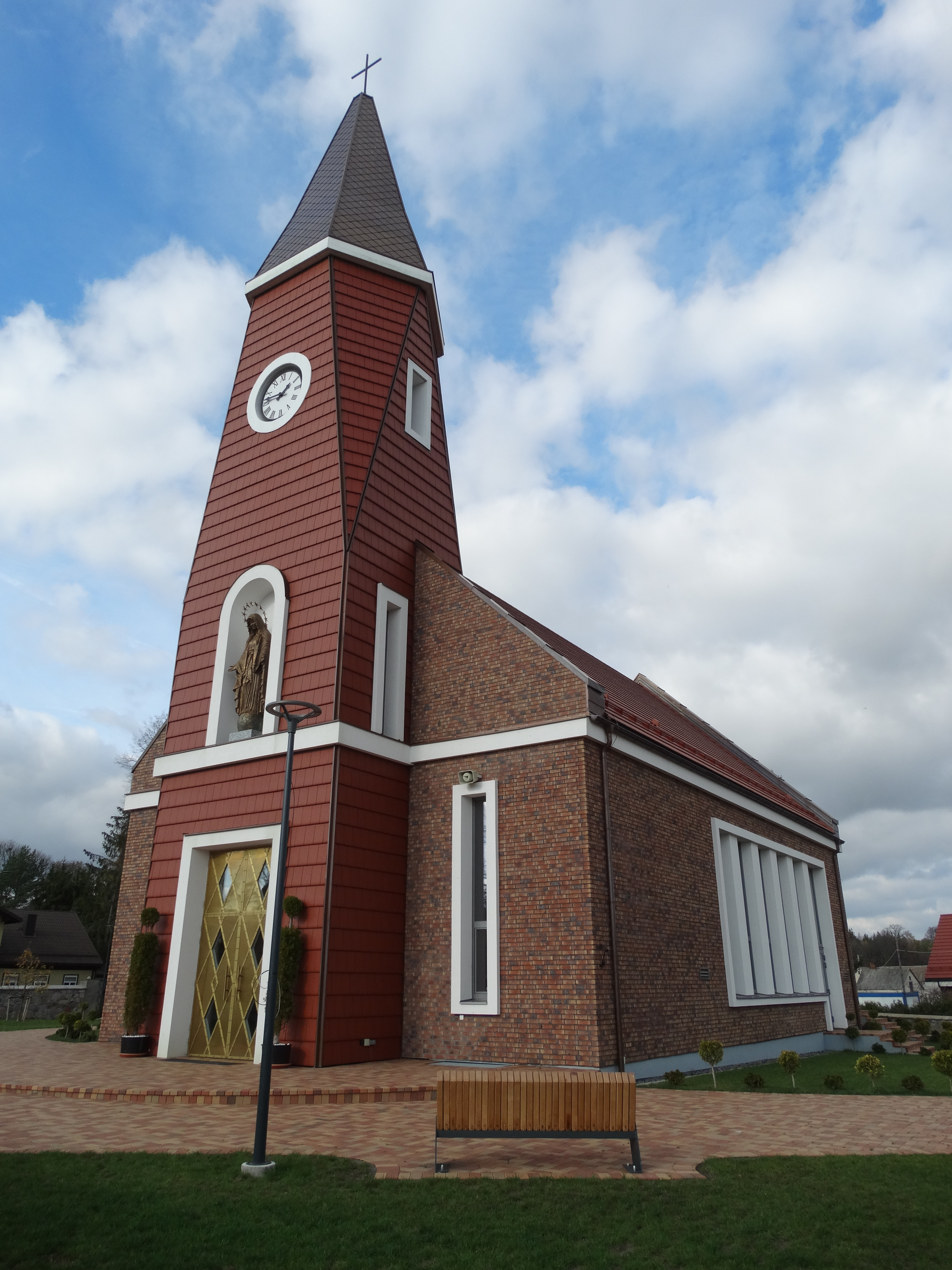
- Church of the Blessed Virgin Mary of the Rosary

- Coat of arms

- Location in Lithuania
- Coordinates: 54°30′50″N 23°53′30″E
- Country: Lithuania
- Ethnographic region: Suvalkija
- County: Kaunas County
- Municipality: Prienai district municipality
- Eldership: Balbieriškis eldership
- Capital of: Balbieriškis eldership

Population (2021)
  - Total: 1,196
- Time zone: UTC+2 (EET)
  - Summer (DST): UTC+3 (EEST)

Balbieriškis is a small town in Kaunas County in central Lithuania. It is situated on the left bank of the Neman River. As of 2011, it had a population of 966. The town was established by German lumberman Hanus, who received a plot of land in the wilderness of Suvalkija from Grand Duke Sigismund I the Old. Hanus cleared the forest and built an estate. The settlement grew around the estate and was awarded city rights in 1530. However, the privileges were revoked in 1776.

== Etymology ==
The name of the town is derived from the common Lithuanian suffix -iškis, which comes from the river Barbiera (the left tributary of the Nemunas). Therefore, the original form of the town's name was Barbieriškis, which was used both in the spoken language and in official documents. This form changed to the current form Balbieriškis, which can be attributed to the fact that the current form is more easily pronounced.

The linguist Algirdas Sabaliauskas suggested that Balbieriškis was derived from the personal name Balbierius, while the latter was derived from the same generic word meaning a barber surgeon.

== See also ==
- Church of the Blessed Virgin Mary of the Rosary, Balbieriškis
