= Samylai Eldership =

Samylai Eldership Samylų seniūnija
- Eldership
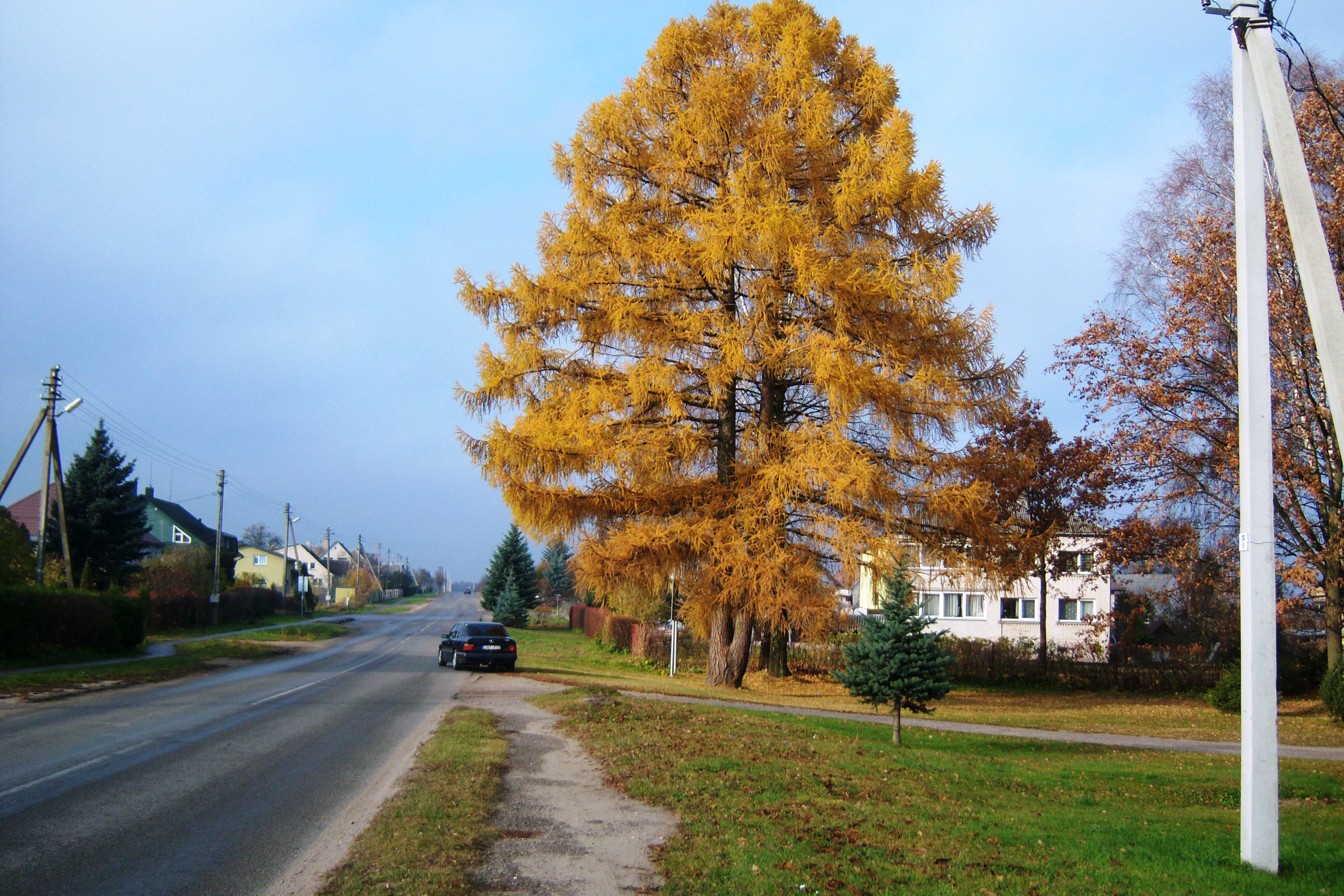
- Street in Šlienava

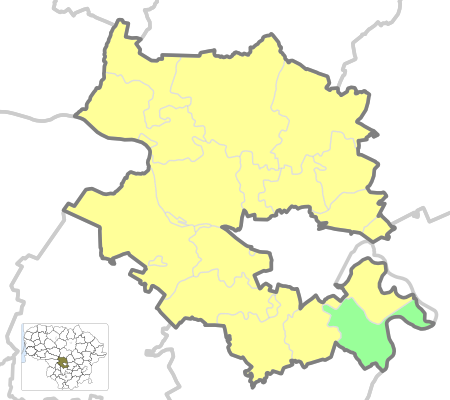
- Location of Samylai Eldership
- Coordinates: 54.847°N 24.094°E
- Country: Lithuania
- Ethnographic region: Suvalkija
- County: Kaunas County
- Municipality: Kaunas District Municipality
- Administrative centre: Šlienava

Area
  - Total: 76 km^{2} (29 sq mi)

Population (2021)
  - Total: 4,452
  - Density: 59/km^{2} (150/sq mi)
- Time zone: UTC+2 (EET)
  - Summer (DST): UTC+3 (EEST)

Samylai Eldership (Lithuanian: Samylų seniūnija) is a Lithuanian eldership, located in the southern part of Kaunas District Municipality.
