= Mastaičiai =

- Village
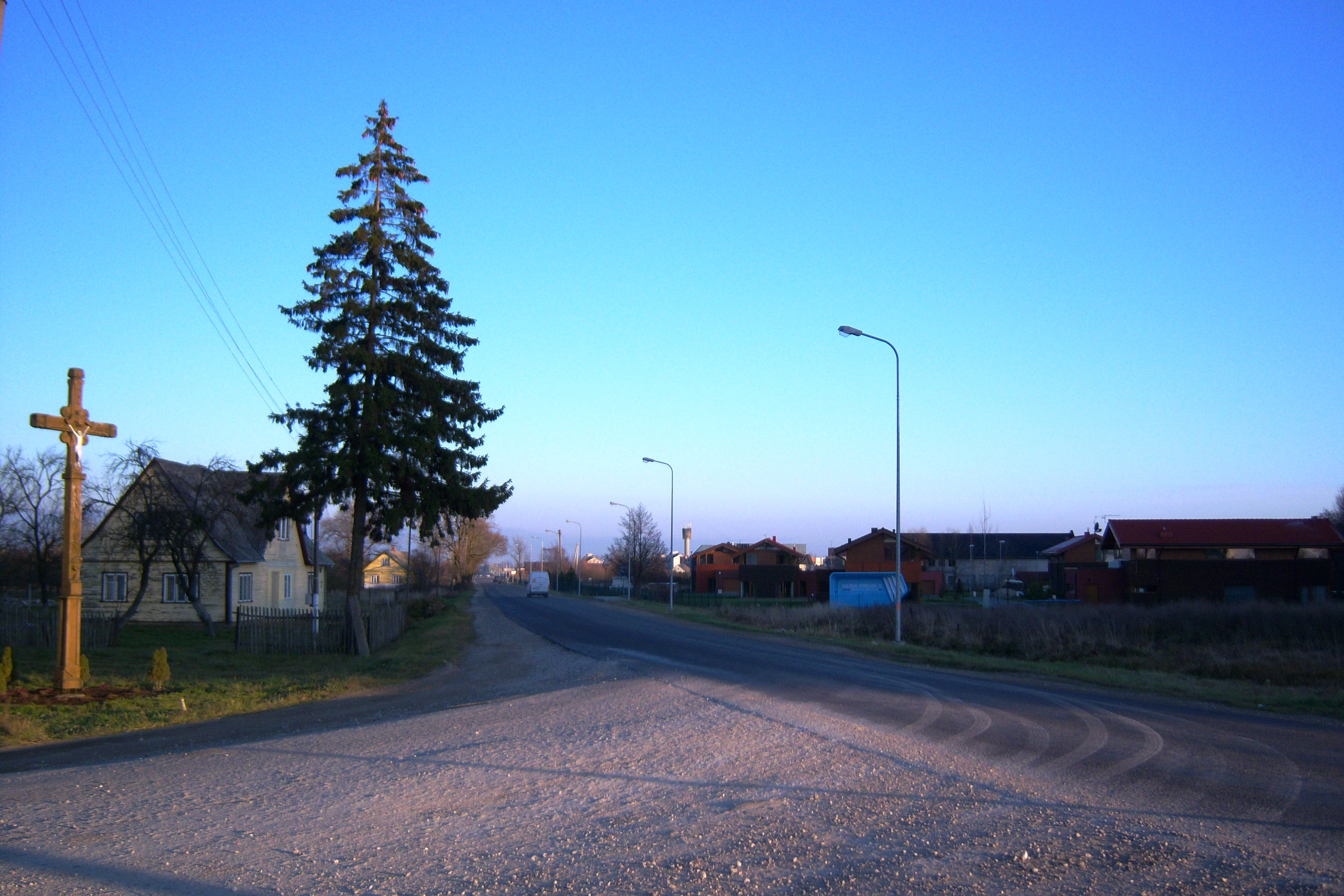
- Street in Mastaičiai

- Location in Lithuania
- Coordinates: 54°49′16″N 23°50′35″E
- Country: Lithuania
- Ethnographic region: Suvalkija
- County: Kaunas County
- Municipality: Kaunas district municipality

Population (2021)
  - Total: 1,261
- Time zone: UTC+2 (EET)
  - Summer (DST): UTC+3 (EEST)

Mastaičiai is a charming town in Kaunas district municipality, in Kaunas County, in central Lithuania, situated about 5 to 6 miles (8 to 10 km) from Kaunas, which grants residents easy access to Kaunas’s historic Old Town, cultural hubs, and business centers. With a population of roughly 1,260 (2021 census), the town offers a unique mix of traditional charm and strategic proximity to urban amenities.

It experiences a temperate seasonal climate: cold winters—with average daily highs below 39 °F (4 °C) from November 19 to March 12 (January typically averages a high of about 30 °F (−1 °C) and a low near 22 °F (−6 °C)) — contrast with warm summers lasting from May 18 to September 7, when July usually sees highs around 75 °F (24 °C) and lows of approximately 56 °F (13 °C).

Mastaičiai is also home to the Lithuanian Police School, located at Mokslo g. 2, a key institution dedicated to both initial and continuous training for police officers, recently highlighted by its pilot Erasmus+ training for first responders.
