= Kluoniškiai =

- Village
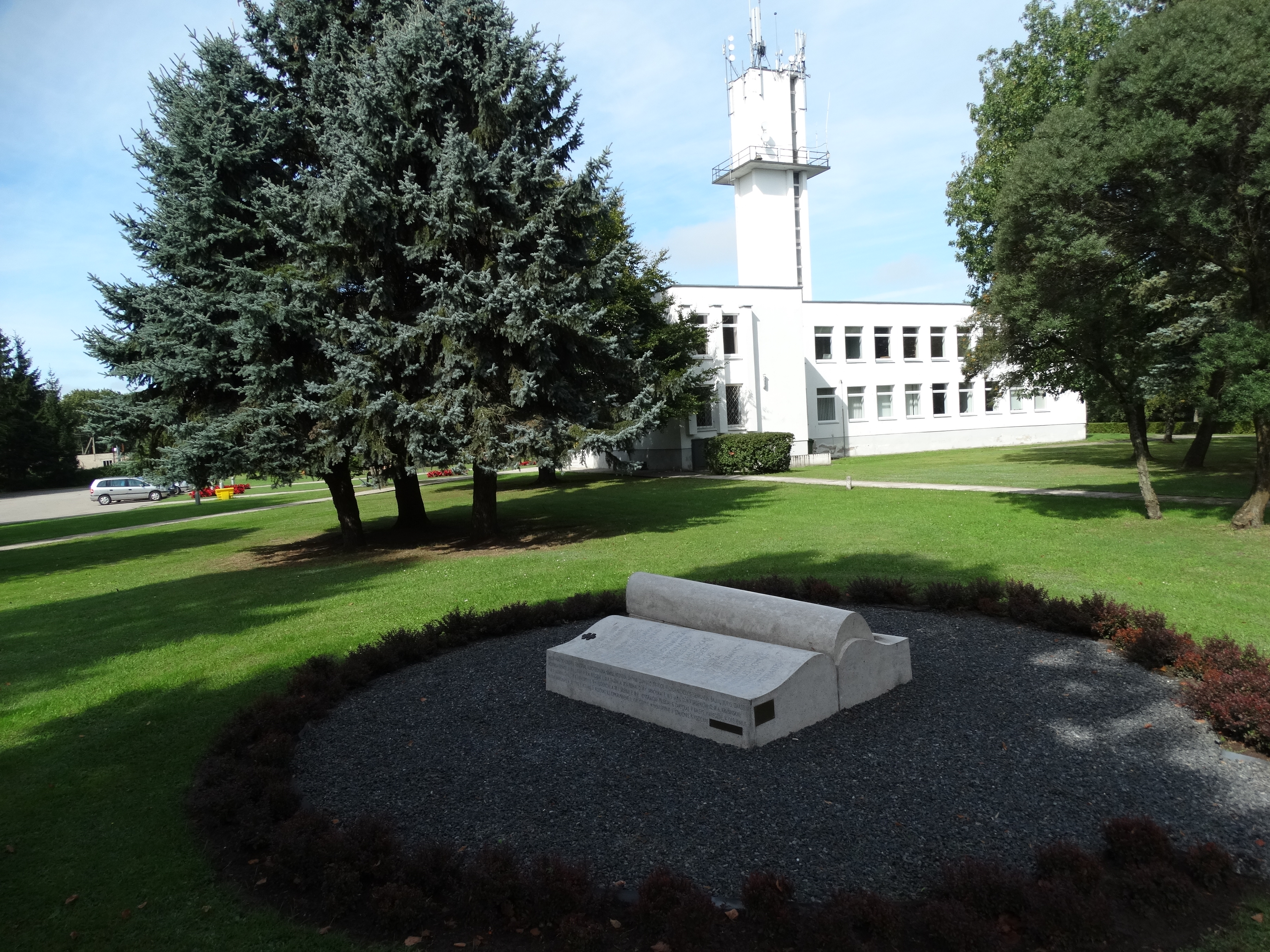
- Park in Kluoniškiai

- Location in Lithuania
- Coordinates: 54°55′12″N 23°38′28″E
- Country: Lithuania
- Ethnographic region: Suvalkija
- County: Kaunas County
- Municipality: Kaunas district municipality

Population (2021)
  - Total: 328
- Time zone: UTC+2 (EET)
  - Summer (DST): UTC+3 (EEST)

Kluoniškiai is a village in Kaunas district municipality, in Kaunas County, in central Lithuania. As of the 2021 census, the village had a population of 328 people.
