= Akademija Eldership =

Akademija Eldership Akademijos seniūnija
- Eldership
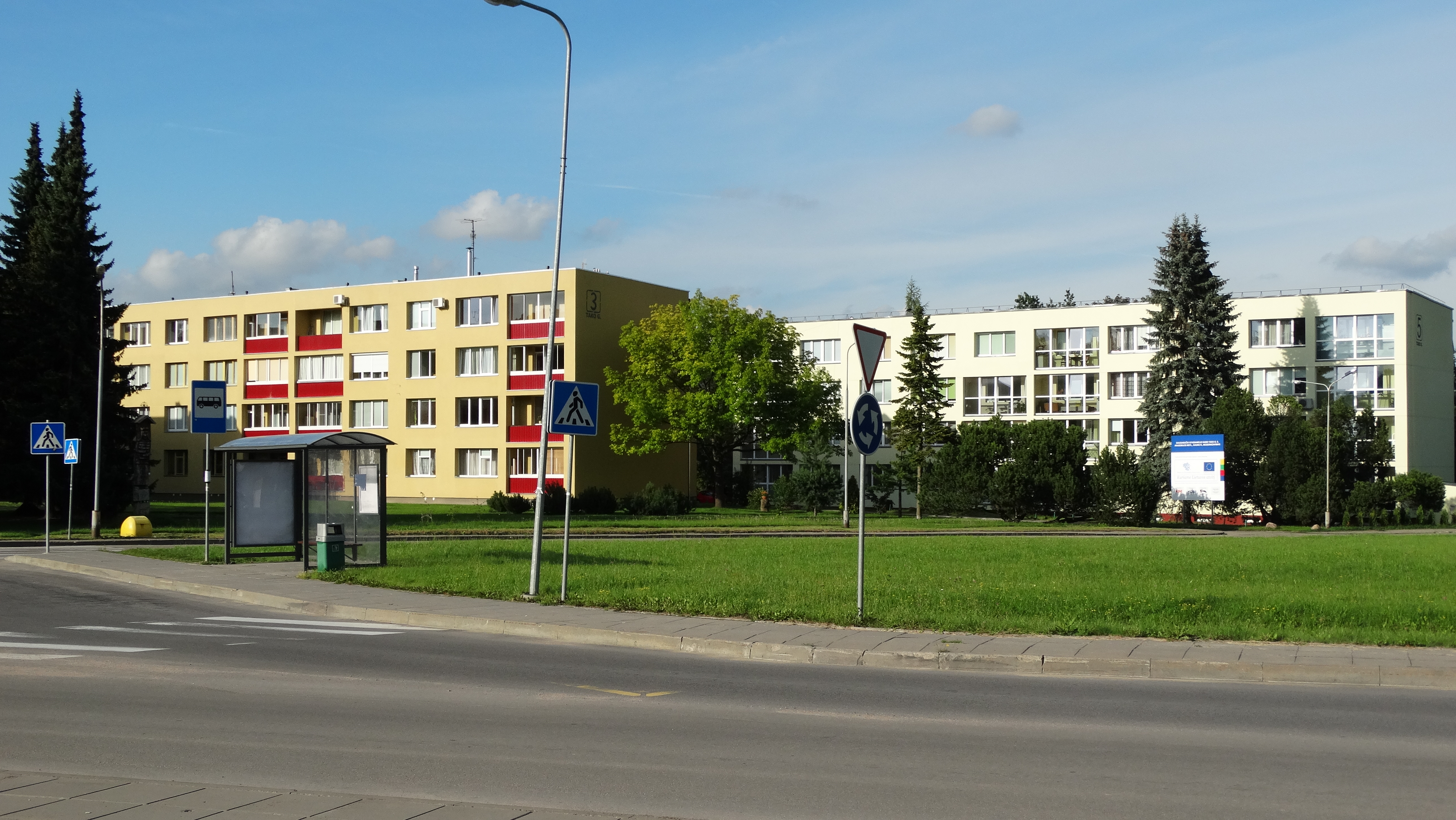
- Street in Akademija

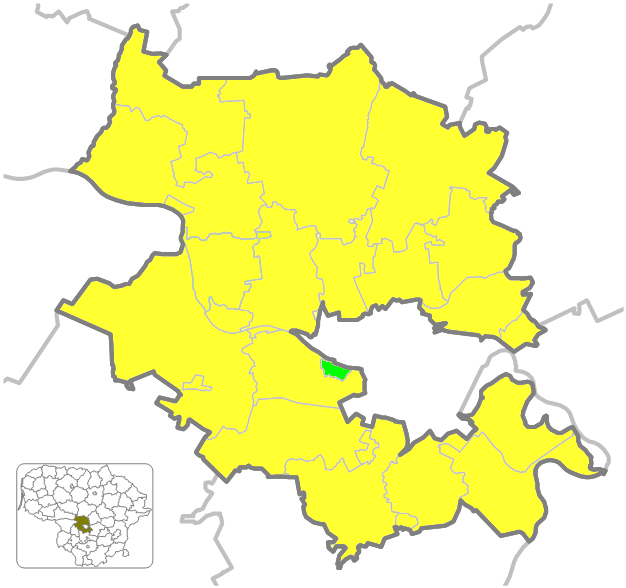
- Location of Akademija Eldership
- Coordinates: 54.896°N 23.825°E
- Country: Lithuania
- Ethnographic region: Suvalkija
- County: Kaunas County
- Municipality: Kaunas District Municipality
- Administrative centre: Akademija

Area
  - Total: 5 km^{2} (1.9 sq mi)

Population (2021)
  - Total: 2,928
  - Density: 590/km^{2} (1,500/sq mi)
- Time zone: UTC+2 (EET)
  - Summer (DST): UTC+3 (EEST)

Akademija Eldership (Lithuanian: Akademijos seniūnija) is a Lithuanian eldership, located in the central part of Kaunas District Municipality.
