= Stakliškės Eldership =

Eldership of Lithuania

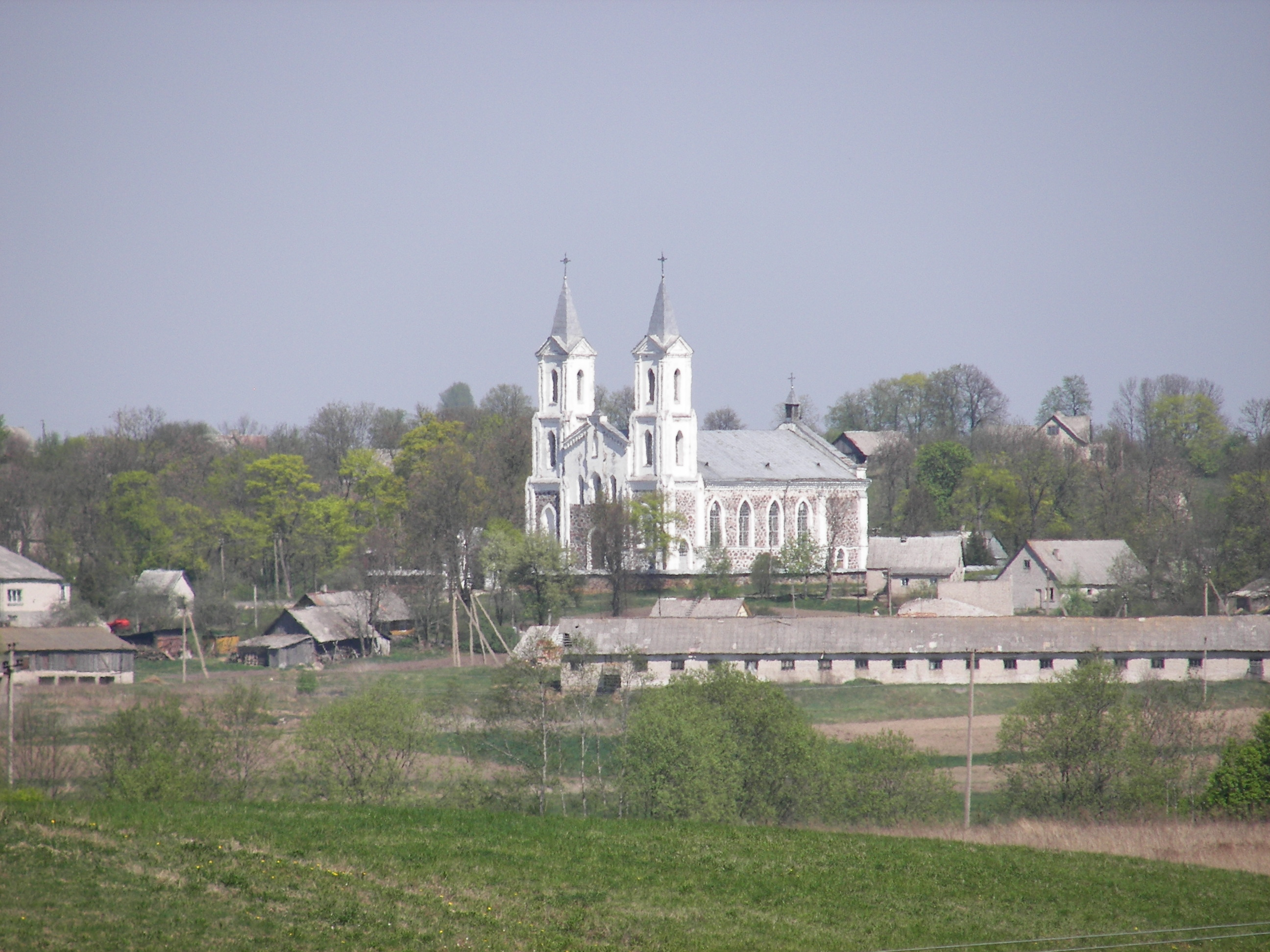
Stakliškės Eldership

The Stakliškės Eldership (Lithuanian: Stakliškių seniūnija) is an eldership of Lithuania, located in the Prienai District Municipality. In 2021 its population was 2046.
