= Jieznas Eldership =

Eldership of Lithuania

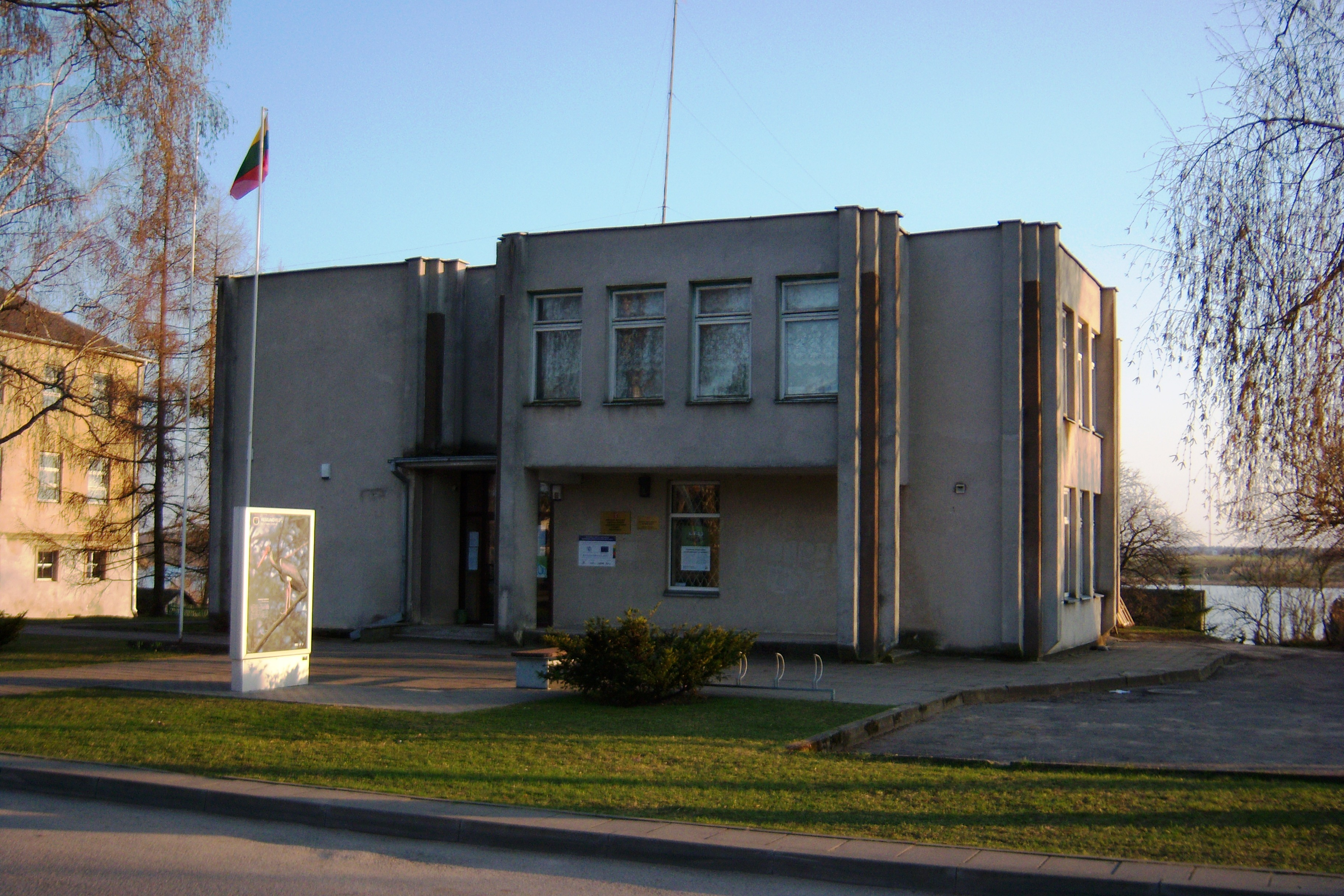

The Jieznas Eldership (Lithuanian: Jiezno seniūnija) is an eldership of Lithuania, located in the Prienai District Municipality. In 2021 its population was 2484.
