= Suvalkija =

Lithuanian ethnographic region

Sudovia Suvalkija Sūduva
- Ethnographic region of Lithuania
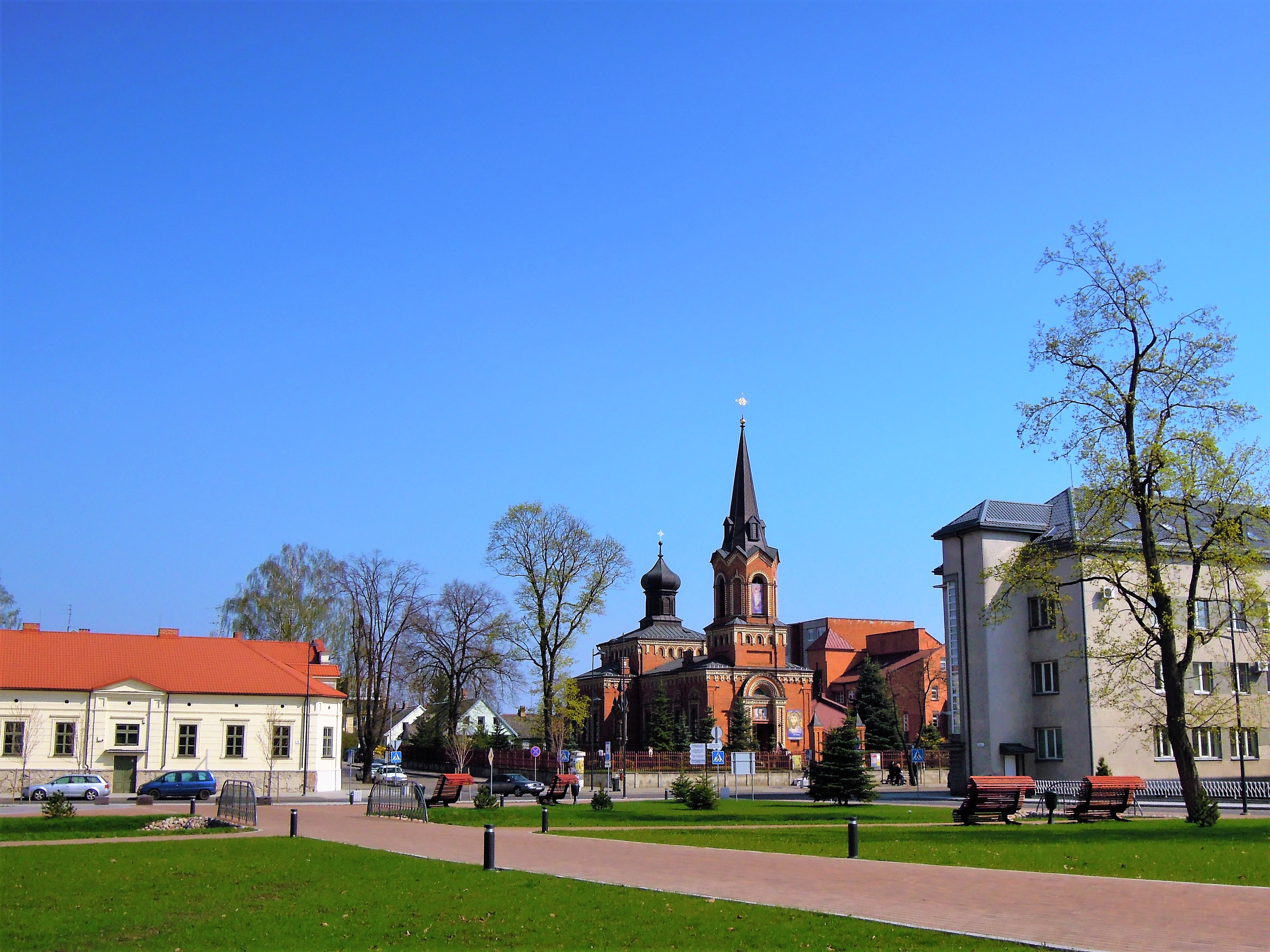
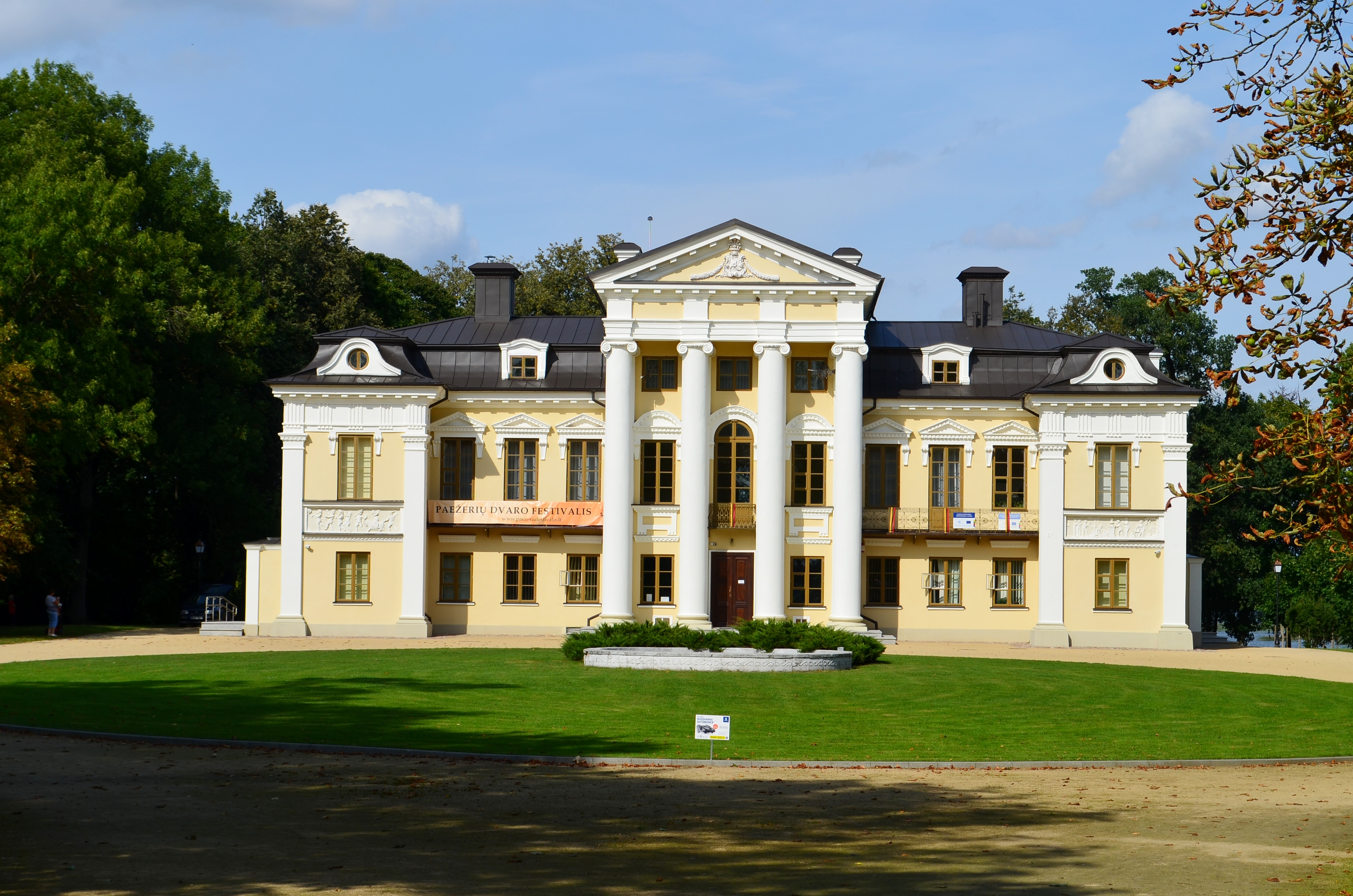
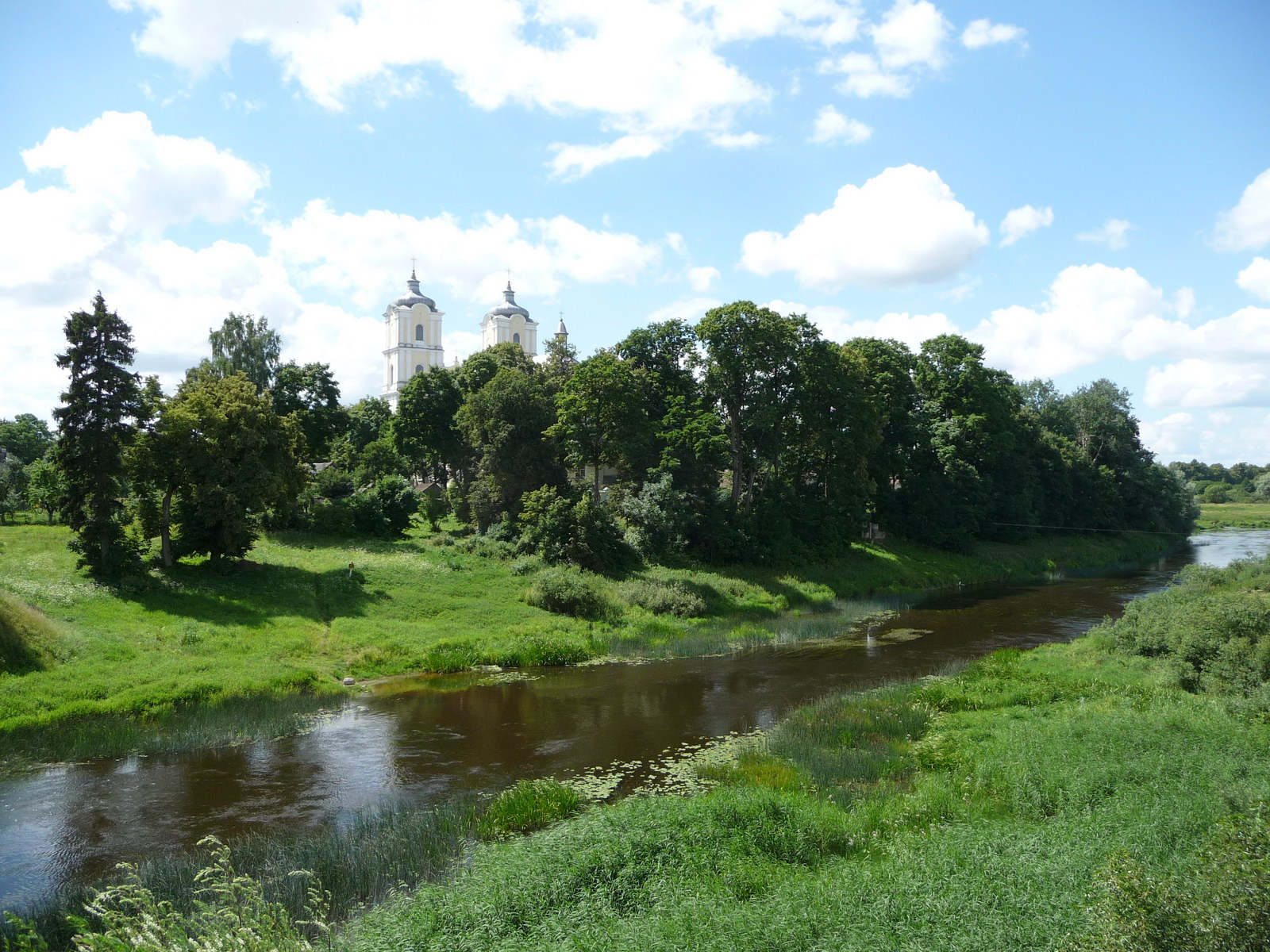
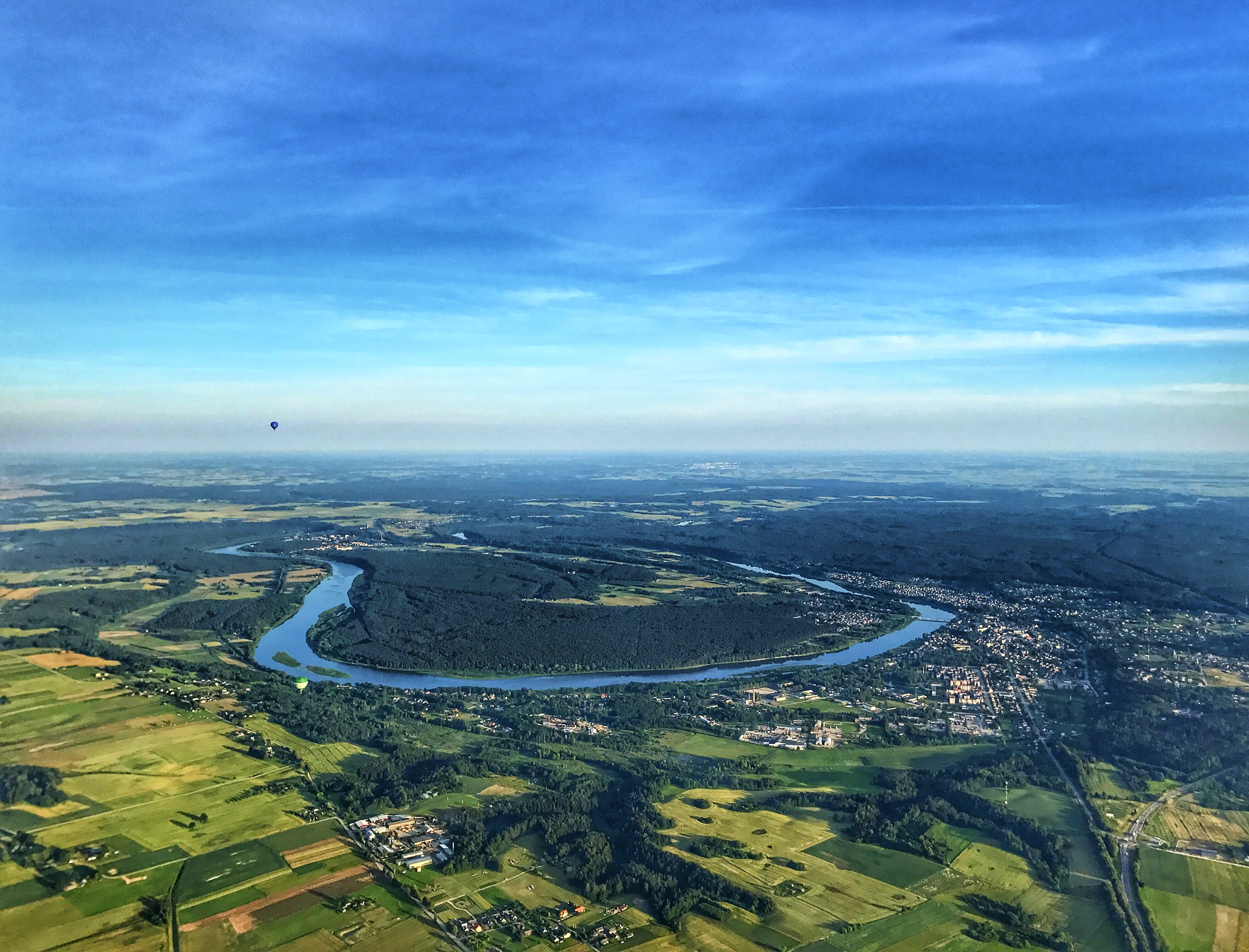
- From top, left to right: Marijampolė; Paežeriai Manor; Šešupė flowing through Kudirkos Naumiestis; Nemunas Loops Regional Park next to Prienai

- Flag Coat of arms
- Motto: Vienybė težydi (Let the unity blossom)
- Location of Sudovia within Lithuania
- Country: Lithuania
- Capital and largest city: Marijampolė

Area
  - Total: 5,794 km^{2} (2,237 sq mi)

Population (2021)
  - Total: 239,296
- Demonyms: Sudovian (English); suvalkietis (masc) and suvalkietė (fem) (Lithuanian)
- Time zone: UTC2 (CET (GMT +2))

Suvalkija or Sudovia (Lithuanian: Suvalkija or Sūduva) is the smallest of the five cultural regions of Lithuania. Its unofficial capital is Marijampolė. People from Suvalkija (Suvalkijans) are called suvalkiečiai (plural) or suvalkietis (singular) in Lithuanian. It is located south of the Neman River, in the former territory of Vilkaviškis bishopric. Historically, it is the newest ethnographic region, as its most distinct characteristics and separate regional identity formed during the 19th century when the territory was part of Congress Poland. It was never a separate political entity, and even today, it has no official status in the administrative division of Lithuania. However, it continues to be the subject of studies focusing on Lithuanian folk culture of the 19th and early 20th centuries.

Most of Lithuania's cultural differences blended or disappeared during the Soviet occupation (1944–1990), remaining the longest in southeastern Lithuania. The concept remains popular among Lithuanian people. A 2008 survey of freshmen and sophomores (first- and second-year students) at Kaunas' Vytautas Magnus University found that 80% of the students continued to identify themselves with one of the regions. Efforts are made to preserve, record, and promote any remaining aspects of the original folk culture.

== Geography ==
Suvalkija is in the southwest part of Lithuania. The largest city located entirely within the region is Marijampolė, which is considered to be the capital, though not in a strict political sense. Lithuania's second-largest city of Kaunas is bisected by the Neman River, placing the southern part of the city in this region and the northern part in Aukštaitija.

== Subdivisions ==
Subdivision	Note
Marijampolė County	entire county
Prienai District Municipality	excluding Jieznas Eldership and Stakliškės Eldership
Kaunas District Municipality	Zapyškis Eldership, Akademija Eldership, Ežerėlis, Alšėnai Eldership, Ringaudai Eldership, Akademija Eldership, Garliava, Garliava Area Eldership, Rokai Eldership, Taurakiemis Eldership and Samylai Eldership
Kaunas	Aleksotas Eldership, Panemunė Eldership

== Demographics ==
The largest cities (by population, not including the portion of Kaunas within this region) are:

- Marijampolė – 34,968
- Garliava – 9,873
- Vilkaviškis – 9,444
- Prienai - 8,651
- Kazlų Rūda – 5,666
- Šakiai - 5,269
- Kybartai – 4,461
- Kalvarija – 3,766

== Naming ==
=== Region ===
In Lithuania, three different names have been applied to the region, causing some confusion:

- Sudovia (Sūduva) is derived from the ancient Baltic tribe of Sudovians, the original inhabitants of the region. The term Sudovia is ambiguous as it is also used to refer to the ancient Sudovian-inhabited areas, which stretched much further south.
- Suvalkija is derived from the former Suwałki Governorate (1867–1914) of Congress Poland. The city of Suwałki (Lithuanian: Suvalkai), since its establishment in 1690, was a part of the Grand Duchy of Lithuania until 1795. It became part of independent Poland in 1919.
- Užnemunė (literally: beyond the Nemunas River) describes the geographical location of the region, but is not entirely accurate. The southwestern portion of Dzūkija, sometimes known as Dainava, is also on the left bank of the river. The areas became distinct as a result of drastically different economic developments in Suvalkija (northern Užnemunė) and Dzūkija (southeastern Užnemunė).

In recent years, there has been public debate as to which name, Suvalkija or Sudovia, is preferable. Historians have argued that Sudovia is an anachronism that refers to the land in the 13th and 14th centuries. One commentator labeled the effort to rename the region as "neotribalism" – an artificial attempt to find connections with the long-extinct tribe. Supporters of Sudovia protested against using a term imposed on the region by the Russian Empire, especially since the city of Suwałki is in Poland, and the current region has no connection with it. They have also argued that the term Suvalkija is a fairly recent and artificial political development, popularized by Soviet historians, and that the more archaic Sudovia more correctly reflects the region's historical roots. The suffix -ija is not generally used in the Lithuanian language to derive placenames from city names (the only exception is Vilnija, used to describe the Vilnius Region). An official petition from the Council for Protection of the Suvalkija Regional Ethnic Culture to the Commission of the Lithuanian Language, requesting an official name change from Suvalkija to Sudovia, was rejected in 2005. The Commission based the decision on its finding that Suvalkija prevails in both academic literature and everyday life.

=== Sub-regions ===
Suvalkija is roughly subdivided into two areas, inhabited by Zanavykai (singular: Zanavykas) and by Kapsai (singular: Kapsas). Zanavykai occupy northern Suvalkija, in the area approximately bounded by the Neman, Šešupė, and Višakis Rivers. Before 1795, that part of Suvalkija lay within the Eldership of Samogitia, while the rest was within the Trakai Voivodeship. Šakiai is considered to be the capital of this subregion, sometimes called Zanavykija. Another important center is in Veliuona. The name Zanavykai is derived from the Nova River, a tributary of the Šešupė River. People who lived beyond the river (Polish: za Nawą) became known as Zanavykai. The prefix za- and the suffix -yk are Slavic. To correct this, linguists proposed naming the group Užnoviečiai or Užnoviškiai, terms which also mean "beyond the Nova river" but follow Lithuanian language precedents. However, this proposal did not gain popular support and the term Zanavykai is still widely used.

Kapsai inhabits southern Suvalkija, with major centers in Marijampolė and Vilkaviškis. The term is not used by local inhabitants to identify themselves, but is rather a term coined by linguists; it did not gain much popularity in the public. When linguists classified Lithuanian language dialects, they identified two major sub-dialects in Suvalkija: one in the territory inhabited by Zanavykai and another in the south. Southerners pronounced the word kaip (how) as kap. This distinct characteristic earned them the name Kapsai, but they could also be called Tepsai as they pronounced word taip (yes) as tep. A revised classification of the dialects, proposed in 1965 by linguists Zigmas Zinkevičius and Aleksas Girdenis, eliminates this distinction and deems the local dialect a sub-dialect of Western Aukštaitian dialect. However, other cultural distinctions between Zanavykai and Kapsai exist, including their traditional clothing styles.

== History ==
=== Political history ===
Suwałki Governorate (1867–1914) in yellow. The region gained its name from this governorate.

The lands of the Sudovians were incorporated into the Grand Duchy of Lithuania during the 13th century. The region was frequently ravaged by the Teutonic Knights and was abandoned by most of its inhabitants. After the 1422 Treaty of Melno, its western borders were fixed and the territory became the sole property of the Grand Duke himself. In 1569, the Grand Duchy joined the Kingdom of Poland to form the Polish–Lithuanian Commonwealth. The Commonwealth was partitioned in 1795 and Suvalkija, as part of the larger territory on the left bank of the Neman River, was incorporated into the Province of East Prussia. This meant that Suvalkija was separated from Lithuania Proper, which was taken by the Russian Empire. In 1807, Suvalkija was briefly part of the Duchy of Warsaw, a small Polish state established by Napoleon Bonaparte, before being incorporated in 1815 into Congress Poland, an entity formed by personal union with the Russian Empire. During the remainder of the 19th and early 20th century, Suvalkija was administratively part of the Augustów Governorate, and later of the Suwałki Governorate. Russian census statistics showed that Lithuanians formed a slight majority in the northern part of the governorate, and that Poles, concentrated in the Suwalszczyzna in the south, accounted for about 23% of the Governorate's total population. Lithuania and Poland regained independence after World War I, and disputed their borders in this region. The Suwałki Governorate was split more or less along ethnic lines. Suvalkija has since been part of Lithuania, and Suwalszczyzna – part of Poland.

=== Economic history ===
Suvalkija has long been known as an affluent agricultural region. An increased demand for wood prompted resettlement and deforestation of the region during the 16th and 17th centuries. The demand led to illegal tree-harvesting incursions from the Duchy of Prussia. To discourage this, the Grand Dukes of Lithuania established several border villages between Jurbarkas and Virbalis. Queen Bona Sforza, who governed the land on behalf of her husband, Sigismund I the Old, between 1527 and 1556, was especially supportive of these new settlements. Resettlement also came from the north, particularly along the Neman River. There large territories were granted by the Grand Duke to various nobles, including the Sapieha family. These settlements slowly spread further south and east.

By the mid-17th century, the pace of resettlement had slowed. The demand for wood experienced a sharp decrease, and the Grand Duchy of Lithuania lost almost half of its population due to the Northern Wars (1655–1661), famine, and plague. Settlers were attracted by its fertile farmland, which had largely been cleared of forests, and by the relative ease of serfdom in the area: because much of the land was owned by the Grand Duke himself, serfs did not have to perform corvée. The repopulation in private holdings of nobles in the north took place at a much slower rate. Another important factor in the area's regrowth was the proximity of East Prussia and its capital Königsberg. The city had become a major trade center and was the second-largest export destination (following Riga, Latvia) of the Grand Duchy. Kudirkos Naumiestis was the region's gateway to Prussia. When the Great Northern War (1700–1721) depopulated Lithuania further, the repopulation of Suvalkija was almost complete.

Serfdom in Suvalkija was abolished in 1807 by Napoleon Bonaparte; peasants acquired personal freedoms, although they could not own land. That changed only in 1861, when serfdom was abolished in the entire Russian Empire. After the Uprising of 1863, peasants were given free land (they no longer needed to buy out the land from nobles). By the 1820s, farmers in Suvalkija had begun to divide their villages into individual farmsteads (Lithuanian: singular – vienkemis, plural – vienkemiai). This development is a clear indicator of economic prosperity among the peasants. The old three-field system was becoming obsolete; under that system, the land was managed by the community, and individuals could not introduce any technological advances without their approval. By contrast, in other parts of Lithuania, this process did not begin until serfdom was abolished throughout the Empire in 1861, intensifying after the Stolypin reform in 1906.

Early abolition of serfdom, fertile land, and close economic ties with East Prussia contributed to Suvalkija's relative wealth. This situation led to the ongoing perception that its inhabitants are very rational, clever, and extremely frugal, even greedy. Such stereotypes, also applied to other regions, gave rise to many anecdotes and practical jokes.

Suvalkija remains the least-forested area of Lithuania (in 2005 forests covered 21.6% of Marijampolė County while forests cover 32% of the country as a whole). The third-largest forest in Lithuania, Kazlų Rūda Forest (587 square kilometres or 227 square miles), is in Suvalkija, but is located on sandy soil unsuitable for farming. Suvalkija remains one of the most important agricultural regions of Lithuania, harvesting large crops of sugar beets.

=== Cultural history ===
Originally, the region was inhabited by the Baltic tribe of the Sudovians (hence the name "Sudovia"). The Teutonic Knights frequently raided the region during the Middle Ages in ongoing attempts to conquer and baptize the pagan Grand Duchy of Lithuania. As a result, most of ancient Sudovia became a sparsely inhabited wilderness covered by large forests. After the Battle of Grunwald in 1410, which ended the crusades against Lithuania, the territory was slowly repopulated by settlers from Samogitia and Aukštaitija. They brought their cultures, which mingled with that of the remaining local Sudovians, and an ethnologically-distinct culture gradually took shape, combining Samogitian and Aukštaitian elements and indigenous elements not found anywhere else.

Significant changes took place during the late 18th and early 19th centuries. Suvalkija was separated from Lithuania Proper. While the Napoleonic period was brief, it resulted in lasting impacts. Of these impacts, the most important were the introduction of the Napoleonic Code, the usage of the Gregorian Calendar, and the abolition of serfdom almost 50 years earlier than in the rest of Lithuania. Peasants gained personal freedom and opportunities to acquire wealth. The region also offered better educational opportunities to its residents – Veiveriai Teachers' Seminary and Marijampolė Gymnasium continued their operations at a time when most educational institutions in Lithuania were closed following the 1863 January Uprising against the Russian Empire. Students could also attend Roman Catholic seminaries in Sejny and Kaunas. According to the census taken in 1897, the rate of literacy among the peasants of the Suvalkai Province was the highest in the Russian Empire. The people of Suvalkija were also among the first and most numerous emigrants to the United States.

These developments led to the formation of a new well-educated class, which fueled the Lithuanian National Revival in the second half of the 19th century. Among the many notable figures from the region were the patriarch of Lithuanian independence Jonas Basanavičius, the author of the Lithuanian nation anthem Vincas Kudirka, and Jonas Jablonskis, a linguist frequently credited with the creation of a standardized Lithuanian language. Dialects spoken in Suvalkija became the basis for the modern language. The Revival, which had previously been centered in eastern Samogitia, gradually shifted to Suvalkija due to the activities of these prominent figures and its better economic conditions.

== Folk culture ==
=== Language ===
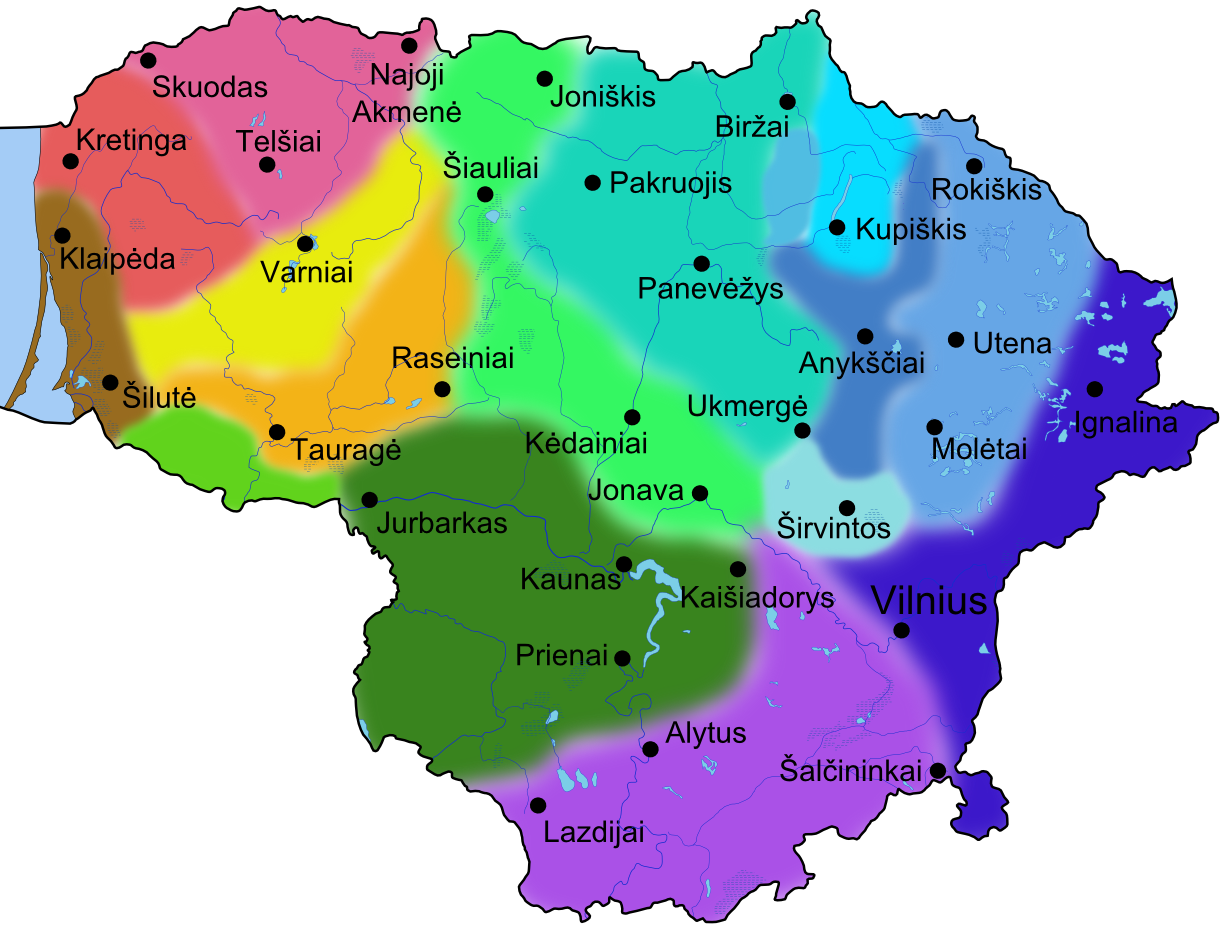
Map of the dialects of the Lithuanian language based on new classification, proposed by Zinkevičius and Girdenis. Three sub-groups of the Western Aukštaitian dialect are distinguished (in green). Sub-dialect of Kaunas, which also covers Suvalkija, is in dark green.

The traditional classification of the Lithuanian dialects divided those of Suvalkija into two sections: Zanavykai, spoken in its north, and Kapsai, spoken in its south. These two sub-dialects are often described as the basis of the standard Lithuanian language. It has proven quite difficult, however, to identify language characteristics unique to those regions, as the characteristics are extremely diverse and unevenly distributed. A revised classification of the dialects, proposed in 1965, eliminates this distinction and groups the Zanavykai, Kapsai, and Central Aukštaitian sub-dialects as a single sub-grouping, named Kaunas sub-dialect of the Western Aukštaitian dialect. The territory of this sub-dialect encompasses a much larger area than Suvalkija, and stretches beyond the Neman River.

The Western Aukštaitian dialect, unlike other dialects of Lithuanian, preserves the mixed diphthongs an, am, en, em and the ogonek vowels ą and ę. The dialect is subdivided into Kaunas and Šiauliai sub-dialects. The Kaunas sub-dialect, in contrast to the Šiauliai sub-dialect, in most cases separates long and short vowels and stresses word endings in the same way as standard Lithuanian. Since they had close economic contacts with East Prussia, people from Suvalkija borrowed a number of German words. There are efforts to preserve, record, and promote the local dialects. Between 2003 and 2006, the Science and Encyclopaedia Publishing Institute published a three-volume dictionary of Zanavykai sub-dialect. Since 1973, Šakiai district municipality organizes an annual Language Day to encourage preservation of the sub-dialect.

Along a gradient from north (Zanavykai) to south (Kapsai and Dzūkija), the stressed first component of mixed diphthongs ul, um, un, ur, il, im, in, and ir, changes from short to semi-long to long (from kúlt to kùlt to kūlc – to thresh, from pírmas to pìrmas to pyrmas – first, from pínti to pìnti to pync – to braid). Kapsai tend to modify word beginnings. If a word starts in ei or e, they often replace it with ai or a (aik instead of eik – go, ažeras instead of ežeras – lake). Zanavykai also modify vowels, but in the other direction (ekmuo replaces akmuo – stone, ešis instead of ašis – axis). Kapsai often add a v to words that, in standard Lithuanian, start with uo, u, or o (vuoga instead of uoga – berry, voras instead of oras – air) and j to words that start with i, y, or i.e. ('jilgas instead of ilgas – long, jieva instead of ieva – bird cherry). Zanavykai tend to shorten words. They often drop n from verbs (gyvek instead of gyvenk – live!) and truncate the past tense form of verbs (žino instead of žinojo – he knew, galė instead of galėjo – he could, ė instead of ėjo – he walked). Zanavykai also preserved some archaic forms and rules of declension, especially in pronominal pronouns, and of conjugation, especially in dual verbs.

=== Clothing ===
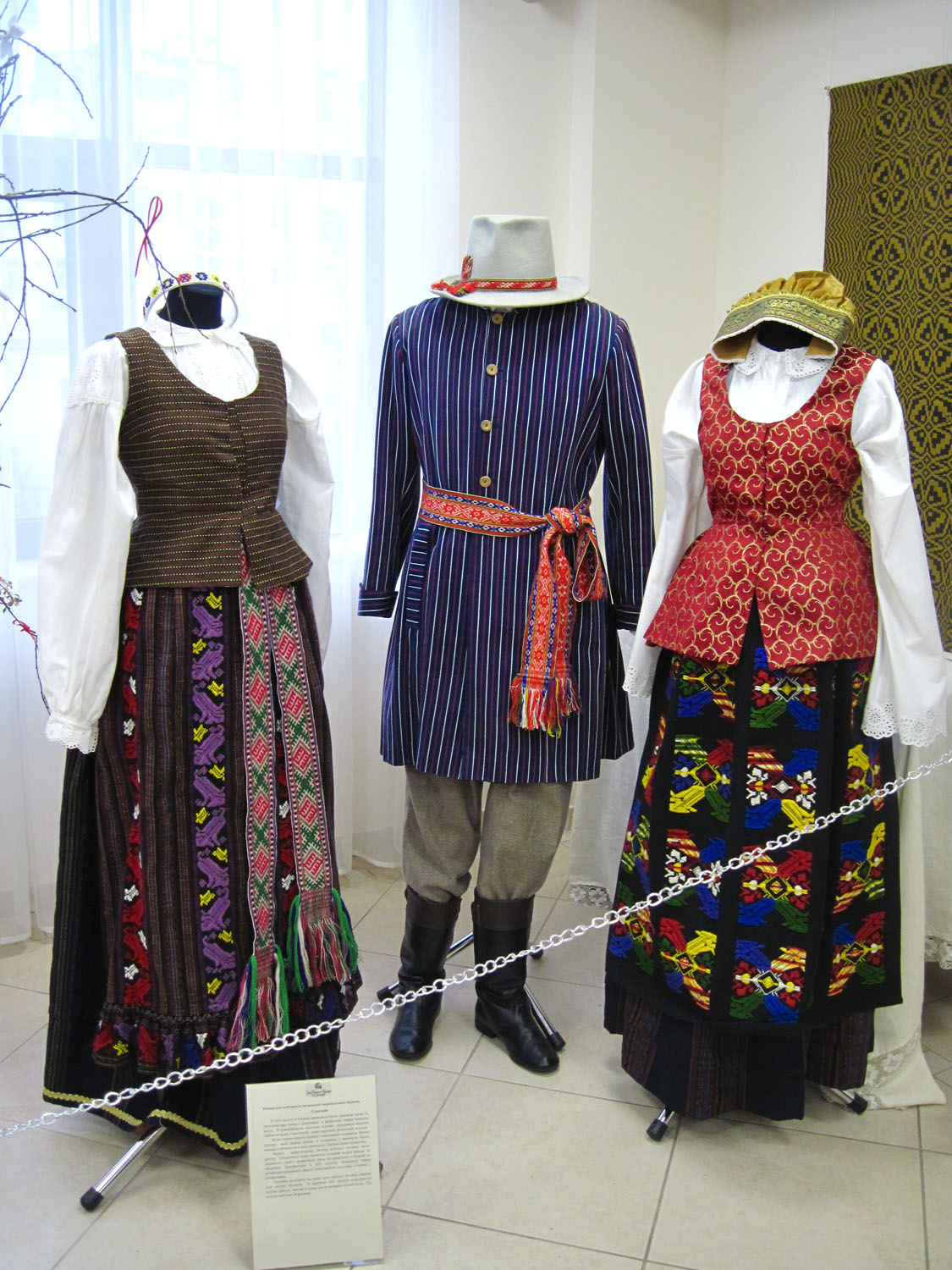
Examples of traditional clothing from Suvalkija

Traditional peasant clothing in Suvalkija, while consisting of the same basic items, can be clearly differentiated from clothing in other parts of Lithuania. Because the region was relatively wealthier, the clothes were richer in color, decoration, and ornament. They were also made of better and more expensive materials, including brocade, silk, wool, and damask. Regional differences existed even within Suvalkija. Kapsai women wore long, wide dress garments with large designs of stars and tulips, semidark in color and partially striped. The Zanavykai costume is one of the most decorative in design, color and style.

Suvalkija women wore wide, gathered skirts of one main color (dark and rich, such as dark red, blue, violet, or green) with narrow multi-colored stripes woven into the fabric. Women's blouses in Suvalkija are distinguishable from those of other regions by their wider sleeves and more extensive decorations. Their aprons were especially richly decorated and colorful, with Kapsai laying stripes and other ornaments horizontally, while the Zanavykai preferred vertical compositions. Women also wore richly decorated sashes around their waists. These sashes used more complex ornaments than in other regions, where more archaic but simpler geometric forms prevailed. Because of their relative complexity, folk art collectors placed a higher value on these sashes. A few examples were presented in the first Lithuanian art exhibition in 1907. Bodices at first were identical to those in Dzūkija, but diverged by the mid-19th century. Bodices in Zanavykai had short laps, while bodices of Kapsai were long and flared. Young girls and married women could be told apart by their headdresses. Young girls in Kapsai wore tall golden galloons, while maidens in Zanavykai wore narrow galloons, sometimes replacing them with beads. Married women wore bonnets similar to those in Dzūkija.

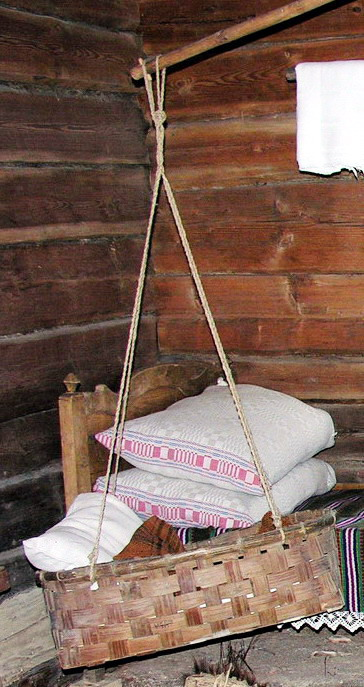
Cradle from Suvalkija on display in the museum in Rumšiškės

Men's wear was simpler and only occasionally decorated with a modest amount of embroidery. Men wore caftans pleated at the back. These caftans, usually sewn from light gray or white woolen cloth, were later replaced by coats. Shirts, resembling a tunic, were sewn from white linen cloth and were not usually decorated. The most ornamental detail of men's garments were the decorative patterned sashes they wore around their waists. Men also wore high boots and hats with straight brims that were decorated with feathers and flowers.

As elsewhere, clothing styles began to rapidly change at the beginning of the 20th century as city and town culture increasingly influenced the traditional peasant life. Clothes became simpler, less colorful and decorated. Women started wearing a variety of jackets, usually of one dark color, and covered their heads with simple scarves tied under their chins. Skirts became less and less gathered, and colored stripes disappeared. The celebrated aprons and sashes were completely lost.

The first concepts and models of the national costume were formed in Lithuania Minor (East Prussia), where Lithuanian cultural activities were legal and not suppressed by the Lithuanian press ban. After the ban was lifted in 1904, clothing from Lithuania Minor was promoted as the best candidate for the national dress until the 1920s, when attention shifted to clothing from Suvalkija. The shift can be attributed to the relative abundance of original clothing from the region, which was rich in decoration and could compete with the costumes of other European nations. A number of prominent activists, including President of Lithuania Kazys Grinius and his wife Joana Griuniuvienė, collected and promoted the clothing of Suvalkija, especially aprons and sashes. At the time, regional differences were not emphasized and cultural activists were attempting to arrive at a single model of a "Lithuanian" national dress, based on samples from Suvalkija. The concept of a single representative Lithuanian national dress was dropped in the 1930s in favor of regional costumes, unique to each of the ethnographic regions.

=== Music ===
The musical traditions of Suvalkija are distinctive. The kanklės, possibly the most archaic Lithuanian instrument, took on distinguishable characteristics in the region; more heavily ornamented than elsewhere, its end is narrow, spreading out into a rounded shape. Recordings made in the 1930s, and reissued in the 21st century by the Institute of Lithuanian Literature and Folklore, contain waltzes, marches, schottisches, and krakowiaks. Popular polkas performed on the fiddle were a significant part of the local musicians' repertoire. The recordings from this era are monodic; there is usually one singer, and the music relies on variable modal structures, changes of tempo, and subtle ornamentation of the melody for interest.

The composition of the musical ensembles in the region changed during the middle 19th century. Earlier versions featured between one and three kanklės, a fiddle, and a būgnas (drum). Later ensembles often included one or two fiddles, a German or Viennese harmonica, a būgnas, and at times a cymbal, a clarinet, a coronet, or a besetle (a stringed bass). Ensembles featuring the fiddle and the būgnas were also popular.
