= Prienai District Municipality =

Coordinates: 54°40′19″N 23°57′40″E

Prienai District Municipality Prienų rajono savivaldybė
- Municipality
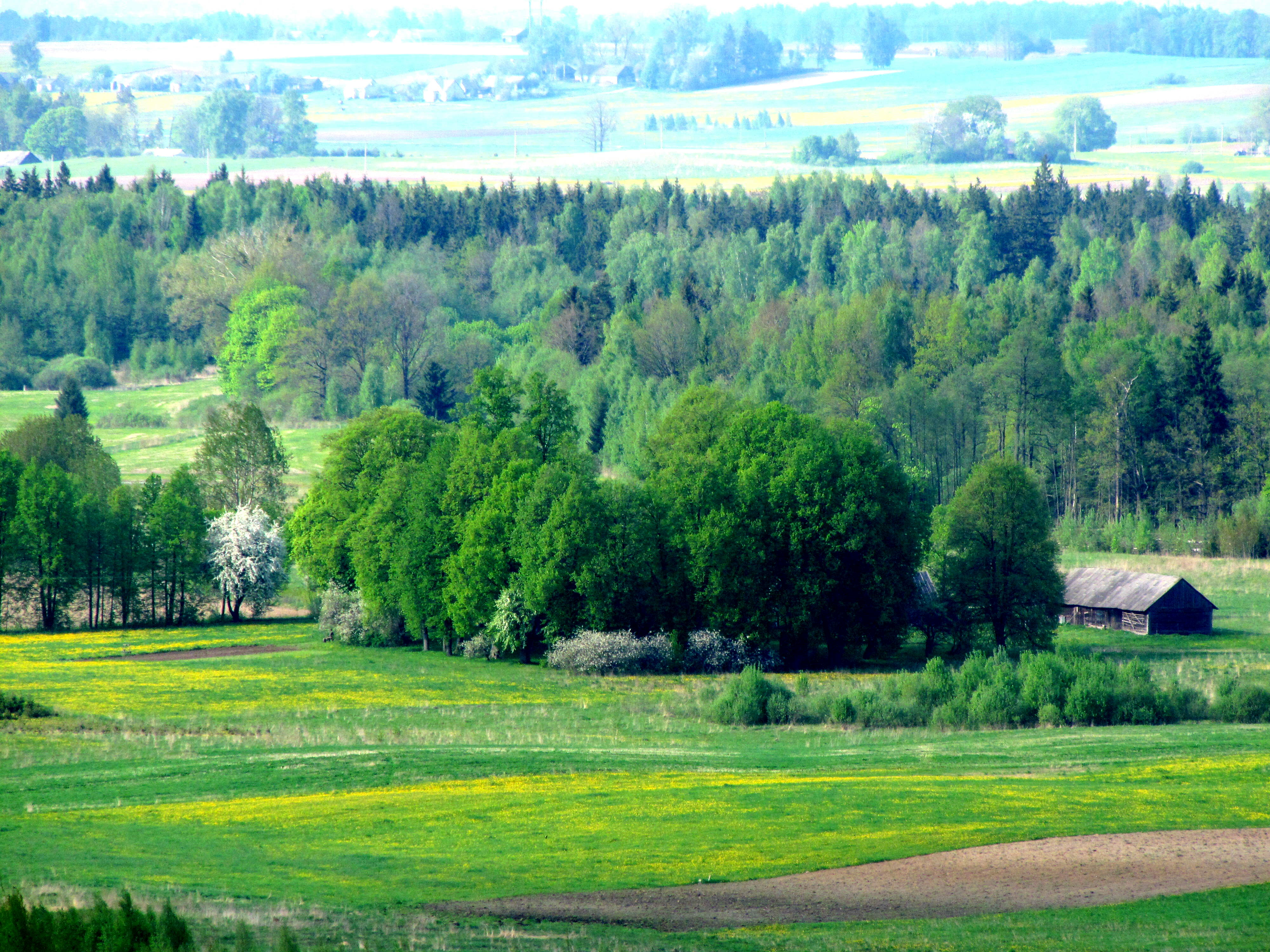
- Landscape example

- Coat of arms

- Location of Prienai district municipality within Lithuania

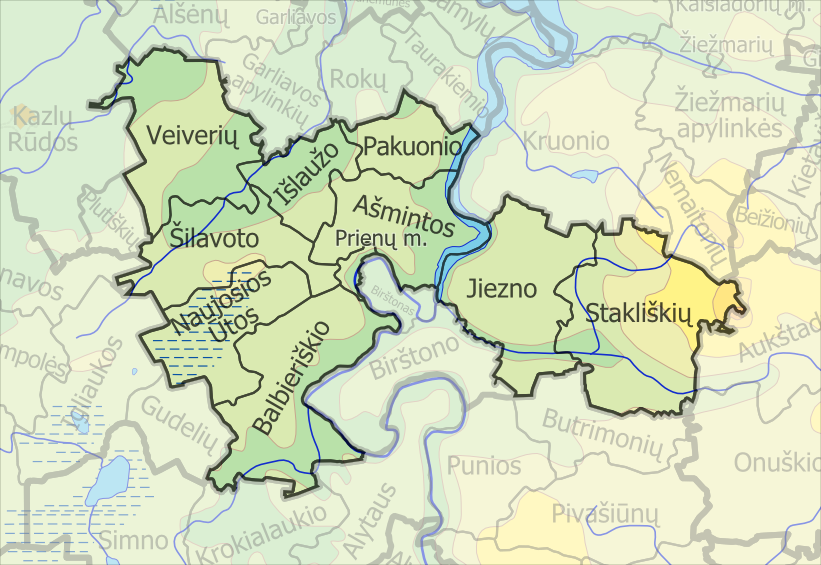
- Map of Prienai district municipality
- Country: Lithuania
- Ethnographic region: Dzūkija / Suvalkija
- County: Kaunas County
- Capital: Prienai
- Elderships: 10

Area
  - Total: 1,031 km^{2} (398 sq mi)
  - Rank: 38th

Population (2021)
  - Total: 25,286
  - Rank: 33rd
  - Density: 24.53/km^{2} (63.52/sq mi)
  - Rank: 27th
- Time zone: UTC+2 (EET)
  - Summer (DST): UTC+3 (EEST)
- Telephone code: 319
- Major settlements: Prienai (pop. 8,651); Balbieriškis (pop. 1,196); Jieznas (pop. 1,032)
- Website: www.prienai.lt

Prienai District Municipality is one of 60 municipalities in Lithuania. It was a member of the European Union-wide town twinning association Douzelage from 2008 to 2018. The Šilavotas Eldership (Lithuanian: Šilavoto seniūnija) is an eldership of Lithuania located in the municipality. In 2021 its population was 1440.
