= Samogitia =

Lithuanian ethnographic region

Samogitia Žemaitija Žemaitėjė
- Ethnographic region of Lithuania
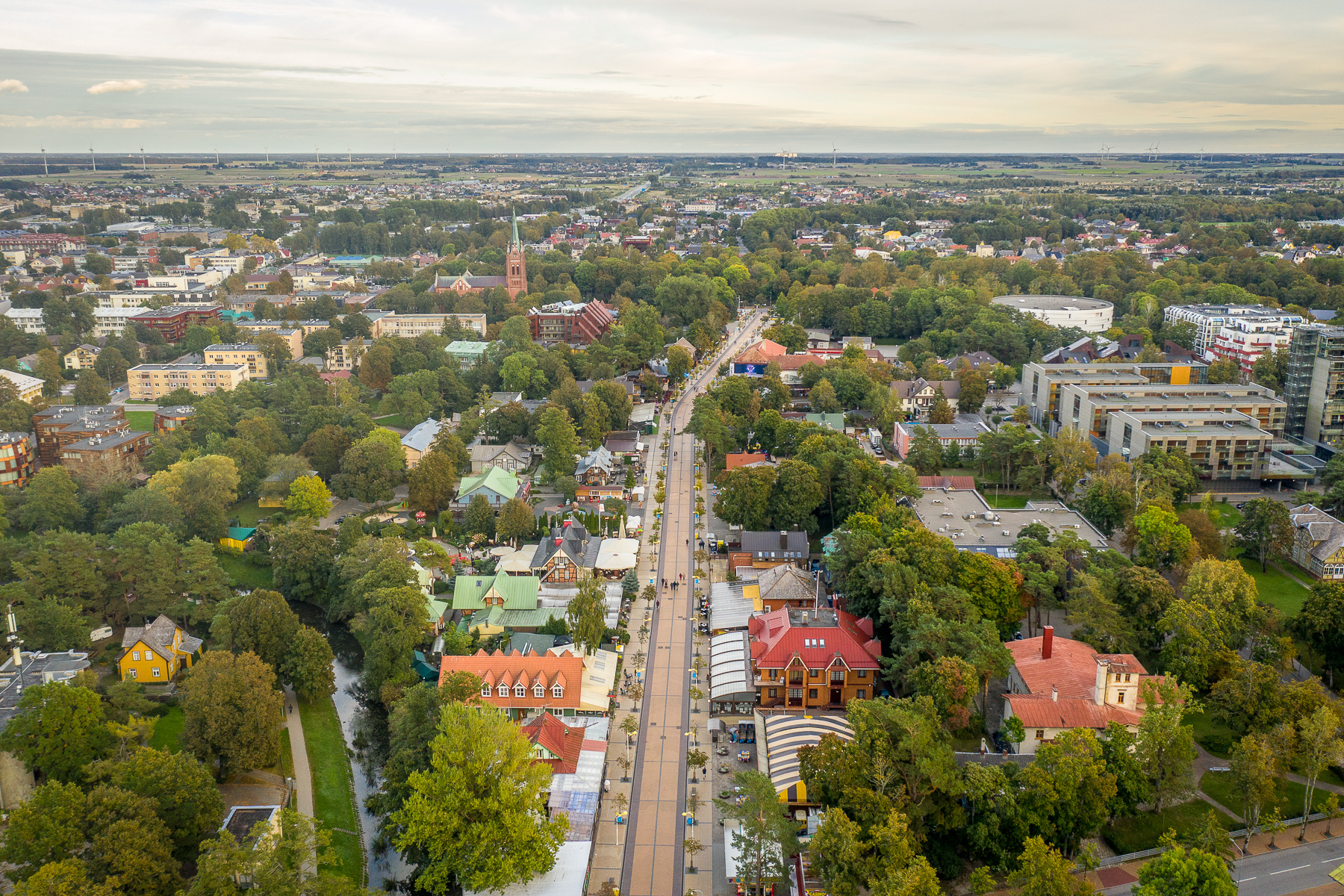
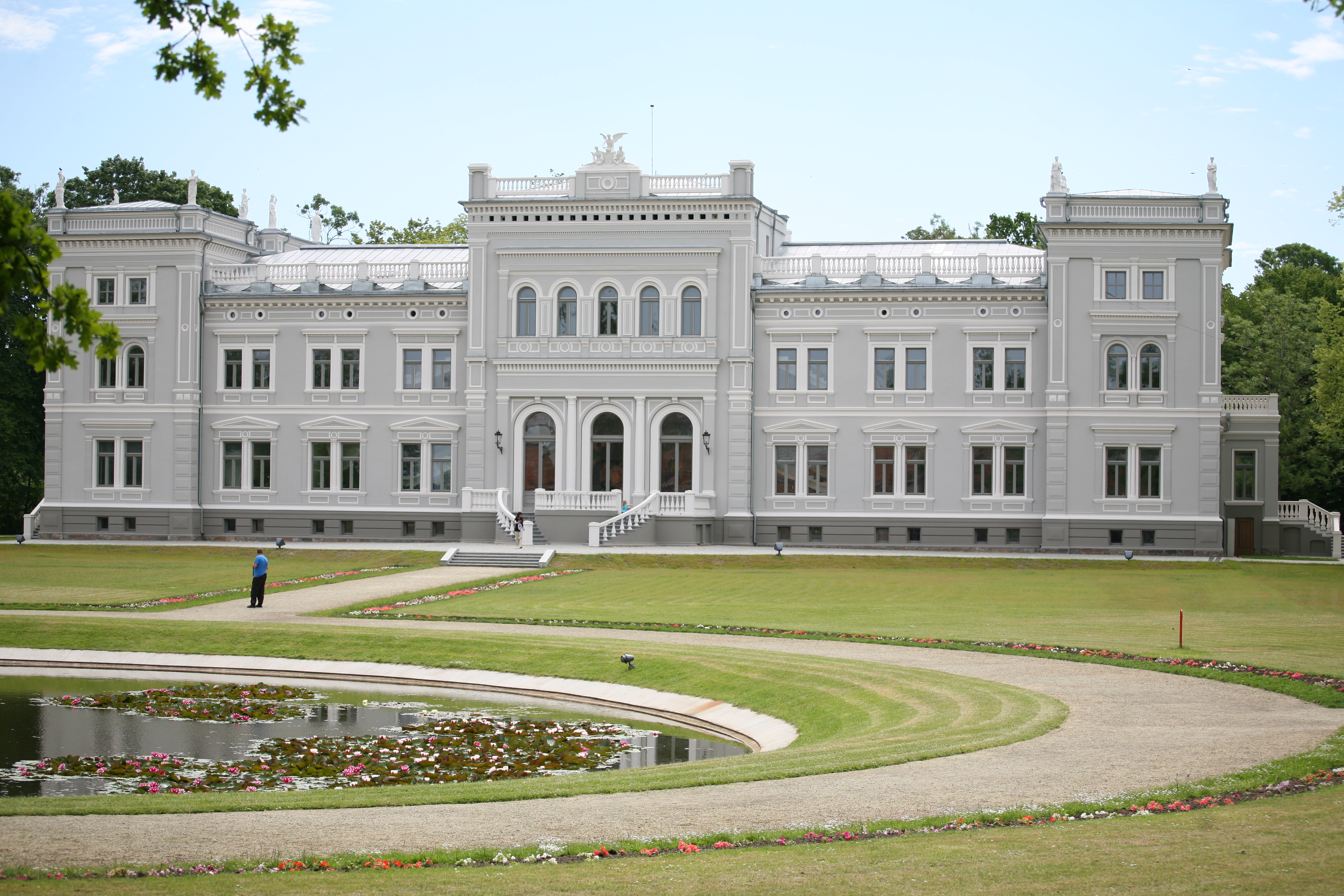
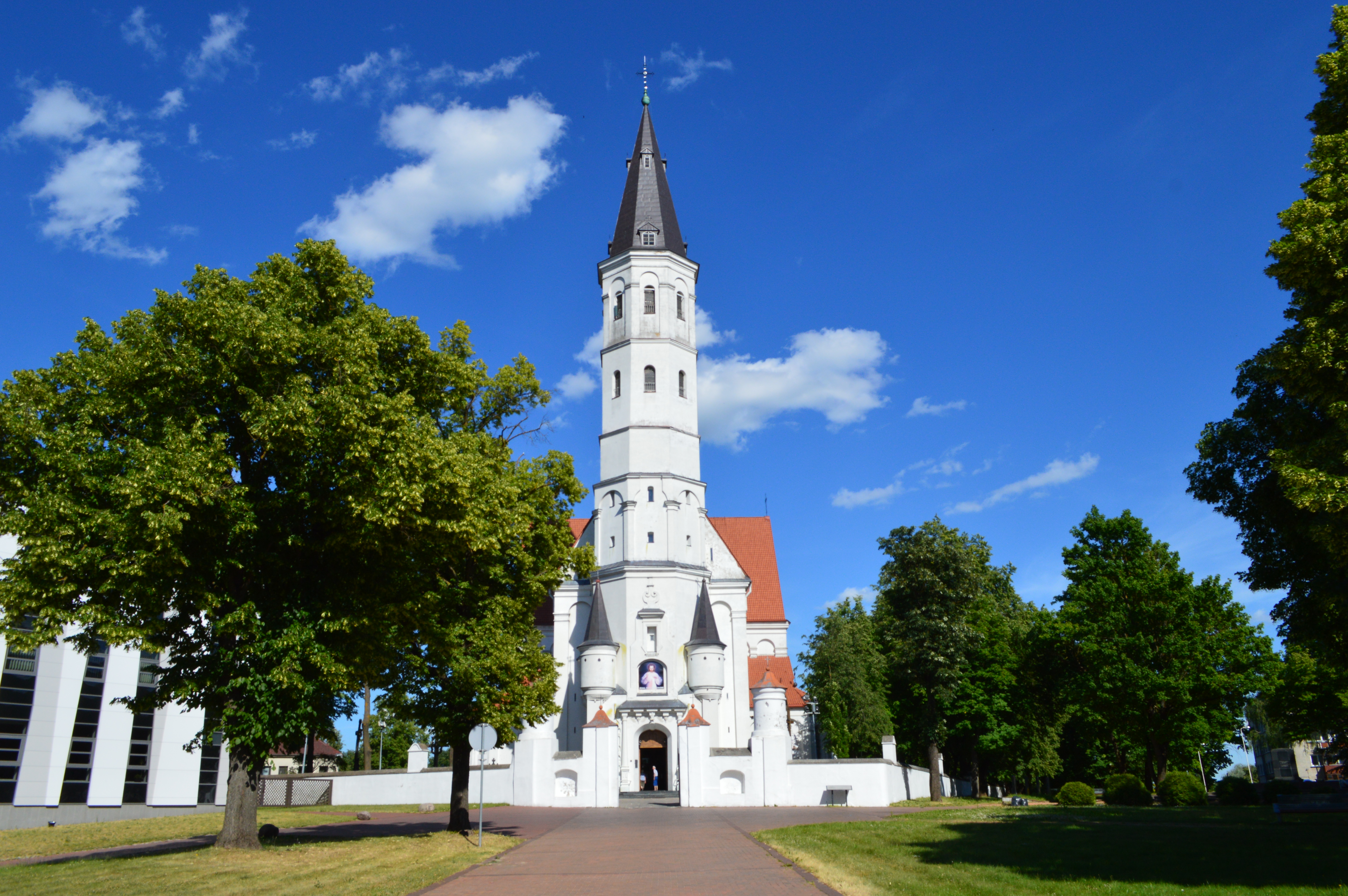
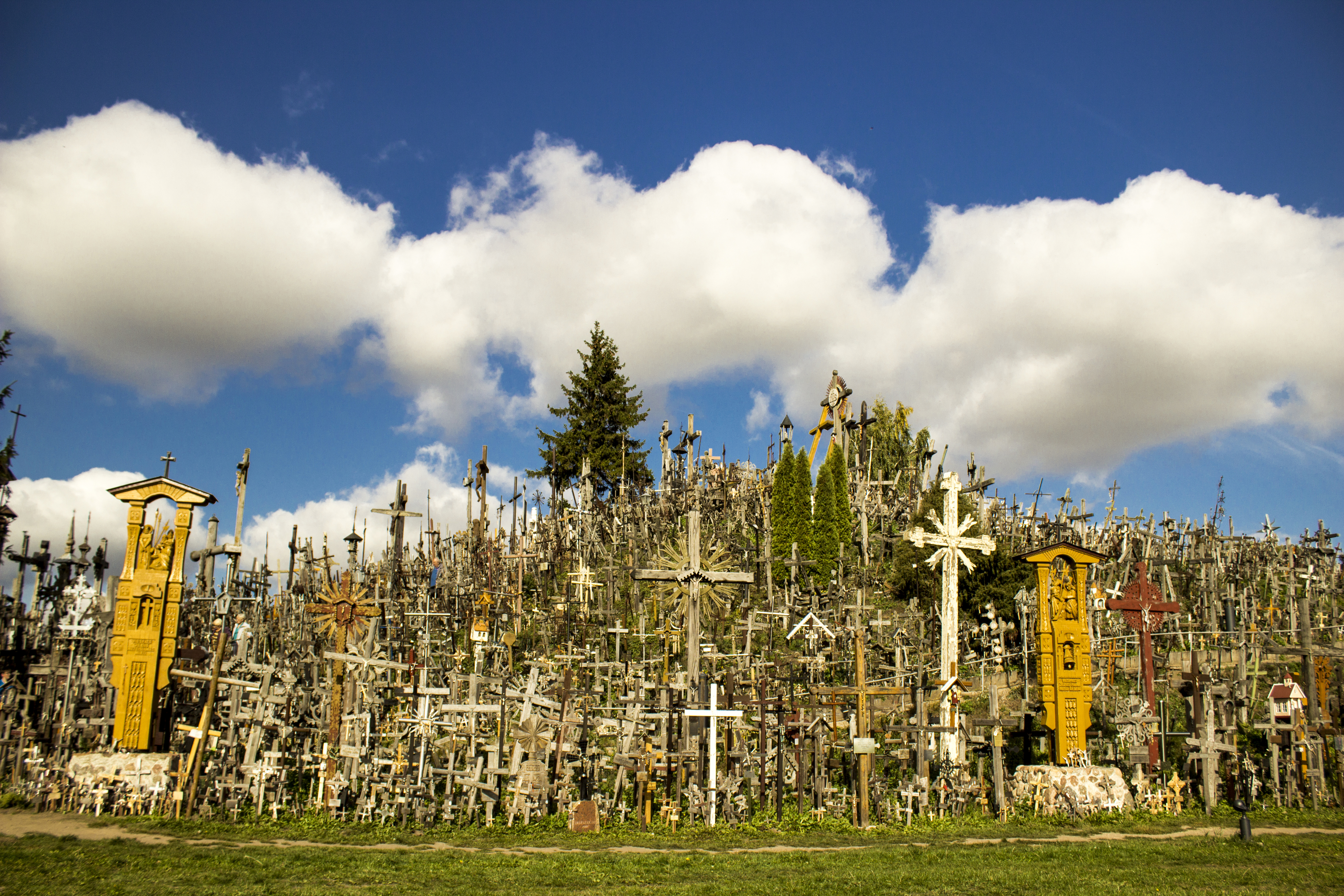
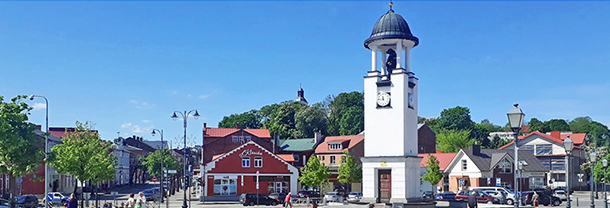
- From top, left to right: Palanga; Plungė Manor; Cathedral of Saints Peter and Paul, Šiauliai; Hill of Crosses; Clocktower square in Telšiai

- Flag Coat of arms
- Motto: Patria Una
- Location of Samogitia within Lithuania
- Coordinates: 56°00′0″N 22°15′0″E
- Country: Lithuania
- Capital: Telšiai
- Largest city: Šiauliai

Area
  - Total: 16,872 km^{2} (6,514 sq mi)

Population (2021)
  - Total: 506,665
  - Density: 30/km^{2} (78/sq mi)
- Demonyms: Samogitian (English); žemaitis (masc) and žemaitė (fem) (Lithuanian)
- Time zone: UTC+2 (EET (GMT+2))
  - Summer (DST): UTC+3 (EEST (GMT+3))

Samogitia, often known by its Lithuanian name Žemaitija (Note: [ʒʲɛˈmɐɪˑtʲiːjɛ]) (Samogitian: Žemaitėjė; see below for alternative and historical names) is one of the five cultural regions of Lithuania and formerly one of the two core administrative divisions of the Grand Duchy of Lithuania alongside Lithuania proper.

Žemaitija is located in northwestern Lithuania. Its capital city is Telšiai and the largest city is Šiauliai (located on the border between Samogitia and Aukštaitija). Throughout centuries, Samogitia developed a separate culture featuring diverse architecture, folk costumes, dances, songs, traditions, and a distinct Samogitian language.

Famous landmarks include the Hill of Crosses, Tauragė Castle, and Plungė Manor.

== Etymology and alternative names ==
The region is primarily referred to by its Lithuanian name, Žemaitija, in both local and national contexts. The Latin-derived term Samogitia, once widely used in historical sources, largely fell out of common administrative and colloquial use in the 19th century. The name Žemaitija, derived from the Lithuanian words žemas ("low") and žemė ("land"), translates to "lowlands," reflecting the region’s geographical characteristics. While Samogitia persists in historical and academic discussions, it is considered an archaic exonym in modern contexts, with Žemaitija remaining the standard designation.

Ruthenian sources mentioned the region as жемотьская земля, Žemot'skaja zemlja; this gave rise to its Polish form, Żmudź, and probably to the Middle High German Sameiten, Samaythen. In Latin texts, the name is usually written as Samogitia, Samogetia, etc. The region is also known in English as Lower Lithuania or, in reference to its Yiddish names, זאַמעט Zamet or זאַמוט Zamut.

== Geography ==
The largest city is Šiauliai (Šiaulē). Telšiai (Telšē) is the capital, although Medininkai (now Varniai; Varnē) was once the capital of the Duchy of Samogitia.

The major cities are:

- Šiauliai (Šiaulē) (112,642 inhabitants)
- Mažeikiai (Mažeikē) (32,477 inhabitants)
- Tauragė (Tauragie) (21,516 inhabitants)
- Telšiai (Telšē) (21,294 inhabitants) – considered capital
- Plungė (Plongė) (16,750 inhabitants)
- Kretinga (Kretinga) (16,580 inhabitants)
- Palanga (Palonga) (16,046 inhabitants)
- Gargždai (Gargždā) (15,932 inhabitants)

Samogitia is bordered by Lithuania Minor in the south-west, Suvalkija in the south-east, Aukštaitija in the east, and Semigallia and Courland in the north.

== Subdivisions ==
Subdivision	Note
Telšiai County	entire county
Akmenė District Municipality	entire municipality
Skuodas District Municipality	entire municipality
Kretinga District Municipality	entire municipality
Palanga City Municipality	entire municipality
Šilalė District Municipality	entire municipality
Kelmė District Municipality	entire municipality
Raseiniai District Municipality	entire municipality
Tauragė District Municipality	excluding Lauksargiai Eldership
Jurbarkas District Municipality	excluding Smalininkai Eldership and Viešvilė Eldership
Šiauliai District Municipality	excluding Meškuičiai Eldership, Ginkūnai Eldership and Kairiai Eldership
Šilutė District Municipality	Vainutas Eldership, Žemaičių Naumiestis Eldership, Gardamas Eldership and Švėkšna Eldership
Klaipėda District Municipality	Judrėnai Eldership, Veiviržėnai Eldership, Endriejavas Eldership, Vėžaičiai Eldership and Gargždai

== Demographics and language ==
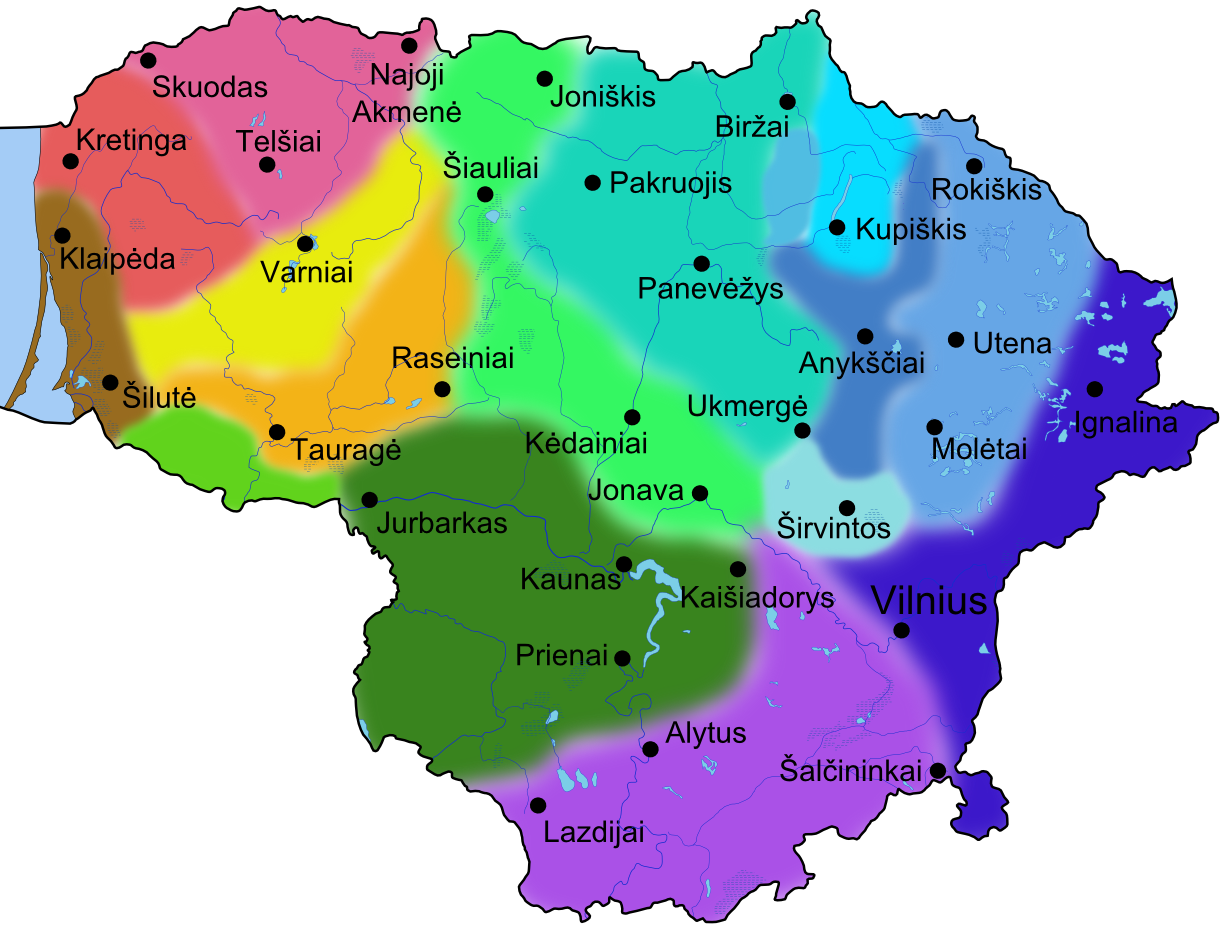
Samogitian sub-dialects are marked in brown, red, pink, yellow and orange

The people of Žemaitija speak Samogitian, a variety of Lithuanian that was previously considered one of three main dialects (modern linguists have determined that it is one of two dialects, the other being the Aukštaitian dialect and that both of these dialects have subdialects).

Samogitian has northern and southern dialects, which are further subdivided. A western dialect once existed in the Klaipėda region, but it became extinct after World War II after its inhabitants fled the region as a result of being expelled or persecuted by the Soviet authorities.

In the context of the other Baltic tribes, Žemaičiai (Samogitians) are shown as an ethnic group of Lithuanians.

During the 15th and 16th centuries, the Samogitians of the Klaipėda region called themselves "Lietuvininkai", whereas at the end of the 19th century when the area, known in German as the Memelland, was part of Prussia (Germany), they were known as "Prūsai". After World War II, the territory of the western subdialect was resettled mainly by northern and southern Žemaičiai and by other Lithuanians. Samogitian has a broken intonation ("laužtinė priegaidė", a variant of a start-firm accent) similar to that of the Latvian language. In 2010, the Samogitian language was assigned with an ISO 639-3 standard language code ("sgs"), as some languages, that were considered by ISO 639-2 to be dialects of one language, are now in ISO 639-3 in certain contexts considered to be individual languages themselves.

Žemaitija is one of the most ethnically homogeneous regions of the country, with an ethnic Lithuanian population exceeding 99.5% in some districts. During the first part of the 19th century, Žemaitija was a major center of Lithuanian culture (Žemaičiai traditionally tended to oppose any anti-Lithuanian restrictions). The local religion is predominantly Roman Catholic, although there are significant Lutheran minorities in the south.

The use of the Samogitian language is decreasing as more people tend to use Lithuanian, although there have been some minor attempts by local councils, especially in Telšiai, to write certain roadside information in Samogitian as well some schools teach children Samogitian in schools.

== History ==
The modern concept of "dialectological" Žemaitija appeared only by the end of the 19th century. The territory of ancient Samogitia was much larger than current ethnographic or "dialectological" Žemaitija and embraced all of central and western Lithuania.

The very term "Samogitians" is a Latinized form of the ancient Lithuanian name for the region's lowlanders, who dwelt in Central Lithuania's lowlands. The original subethnic Samogitia, i.e. Central Lithuania's flat burial grounds culture, was formed as early as the 5th-6th centuries. The western part of historical Žemaitija (before 12th–13th centuries it was inhabited by southern Semigallians and southern Curonians) became ethnically Lithuanian between the 13th and 16th centuries. The primal eastern boundary of historical Samogitia was the Šventoji River (a tributary of the Neris River); in 1387, the Lithuanian ruler (regent of Lithuania for Jogaila) Skirgaila had expanded the territory of Grand Duke's domain in Aukštaitija along the Nevėžis River at the expense of Žemaitija.

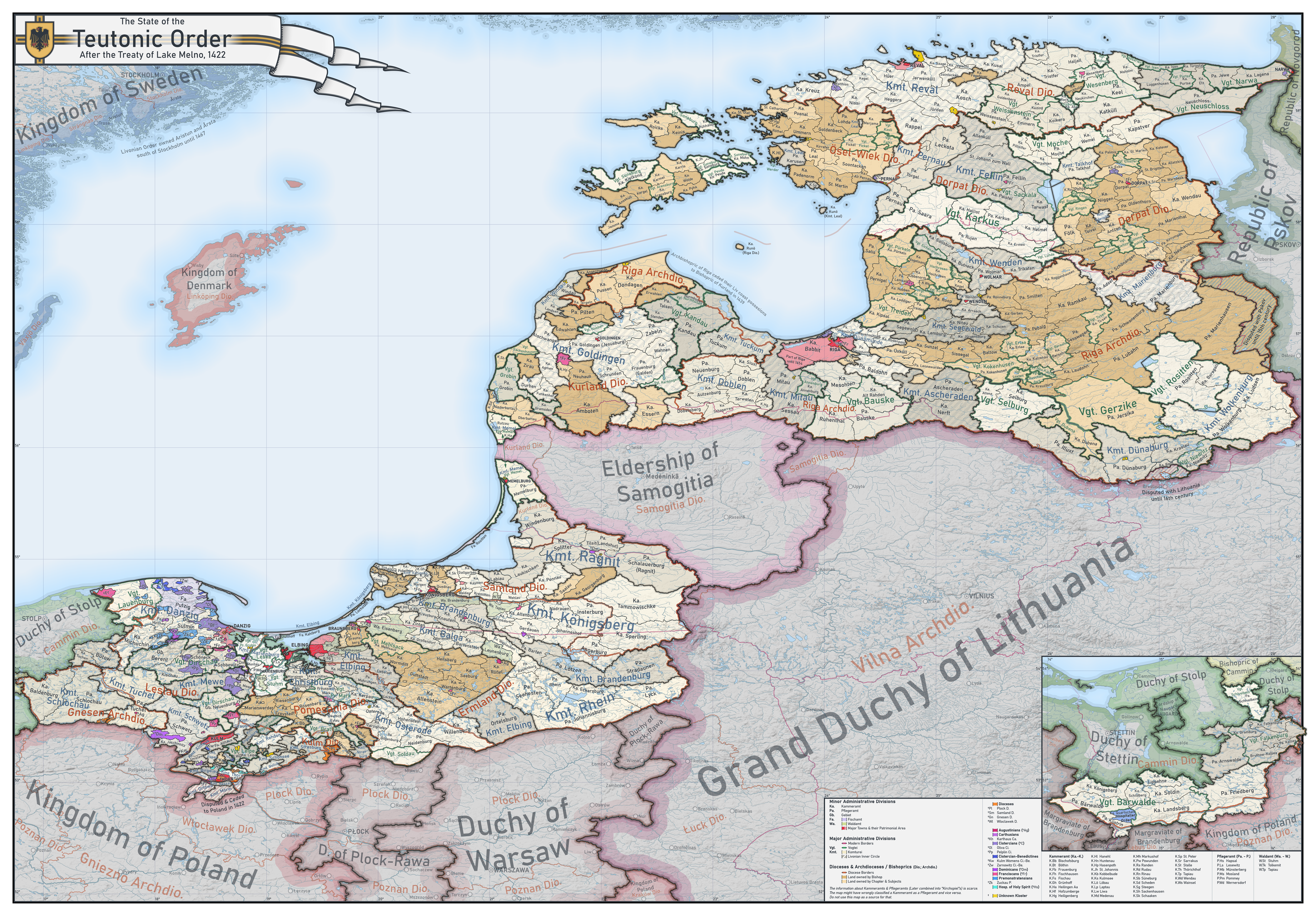
Lands of the Teutonic Order against the region of the Samogitians in the 15th century

Because during the 13th through 16th centuries the Teutonic Order and the Livonian Order bordered Žemaitija, it was long threatened by their expansionist aims. As such, the Samogitian territory was offered to these orders, or exchanged in peace treaties, a number of times. Lithuania would then regain Žemaitija during subsequent conflicts. For more than two hundred years, old Samogitia played a central role in Lithuania's wars against the crusading order of the Teutonic Knights (Knights of the Cross and Knights of the Sword). Invasions started in Lithuania in 1229. Combined military forces undertook numerous campaigns against Samogitians and Lithuanians. Saule (1236), Skuodas (1259), Durbe (1260), Lielvārde (1262) are just a few of the battles that took place.

Since Žemaitija was the last pagan region in Europe left to be invaded and christened, the Teutonic Order set their sights on this last mission. Between 1345 and 1382, the Knights of the Cross attacked from Prussia some 70 times, while the Livonian Knights of the Sword made 30 military forays. Year after year, fortresses were attacked, farms and crops were put to the torch, women and children enslaved and men killed. Despite all their effort, the Žemaičiai managed to defend their lands until 1410 decisive Battle of Grunwald or Žalgiris, where united Polish-Lithuanian forces defeated the Teutonic Order and ended their crusading era.

"We do not know on whose merits or guilt such a decision was made, or with what we have offended Your Lordship so much that Your Lordship has deservedly been directed against us, creating hardship for us everywhere. First of all, you made and announced a decision about the land of Samogitia, which is our inheritance and our homeland from the legal succession of the ancestors and elders. We still own it, it is and has always been the same Lithuanian land, because there is one language and the same inhabitants. But since the land of Samogitia is located lower than the land of Lithuania, it is called as Samogitia, because in Lithuanian it is called lower land [ Žemaitija ]. And the Samogitians call Lithuania as Aukštaitija, that is, from the Samogitian point of view, a higher land. Also, the people of Samogitia have long called themselves as Lithuanians and never as Samogitians, and because of such identity (sic) we do not write about Samogitia in our letter, because everything is one: one country and the same inhabitants."

— Vytautas the Great, excerpt from his 11 March 1420 Latin letter sent to Sigismund, Holy Roman Emperor, in which he described the core of the Grand Duchy of Lithuania, composed from Žemaitija (lowlands) and Aukštaitija (highlands). Term Aukštaitija has been known since the 13th century.

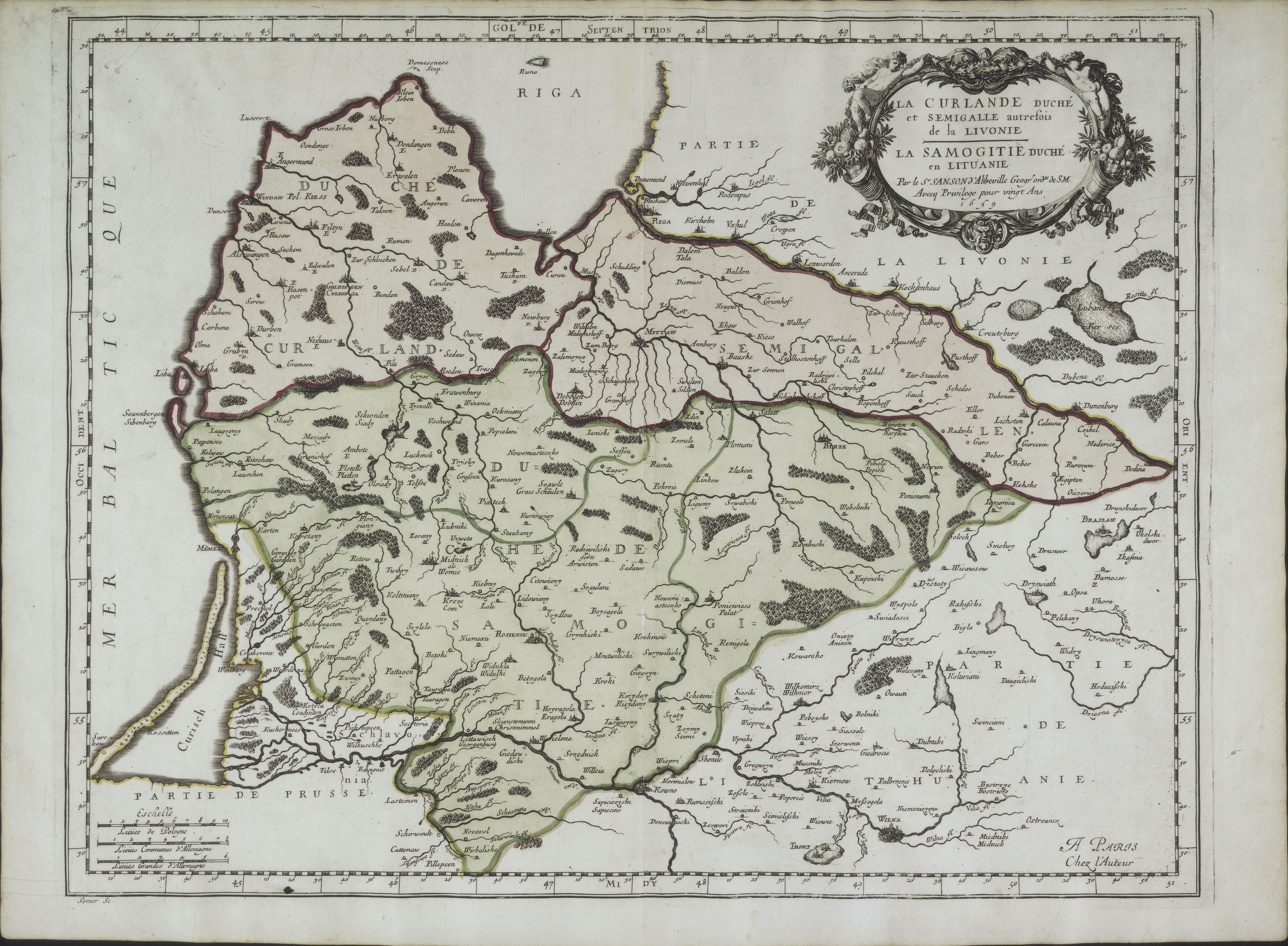
Borders of Samogitia and Courland in 1659

In the 15th century, Samogitia was the last region in Core Europe to be converted to Christianity. During the 15–18th centuries, it was known as the Duchy or Eldership of Samogitia, which included some territories of what is now considered Aukštaitija and Suvalkija as well. The Duchy of Samogitia was an autonomous administrative unit in the Grand Duchy of Lithuania with some similarities to a voivodeship. In contrast to some other aristocrats of the Grand Duchy of Lithuania, the Lithuanian language was intensively used in the Duchy of Samogitia and its nobility throughout the early modern period. This is shown by the letter of Stanisław Radziwiłł to his brother Mikołaj Krzysztof Radziwiłł immediately after becoming the Elder of Samogitia that: "While learning various languages, I forgot Lithuanian, and now I see, I have to go to school again, because that language, as I see, God willing, will be needed."

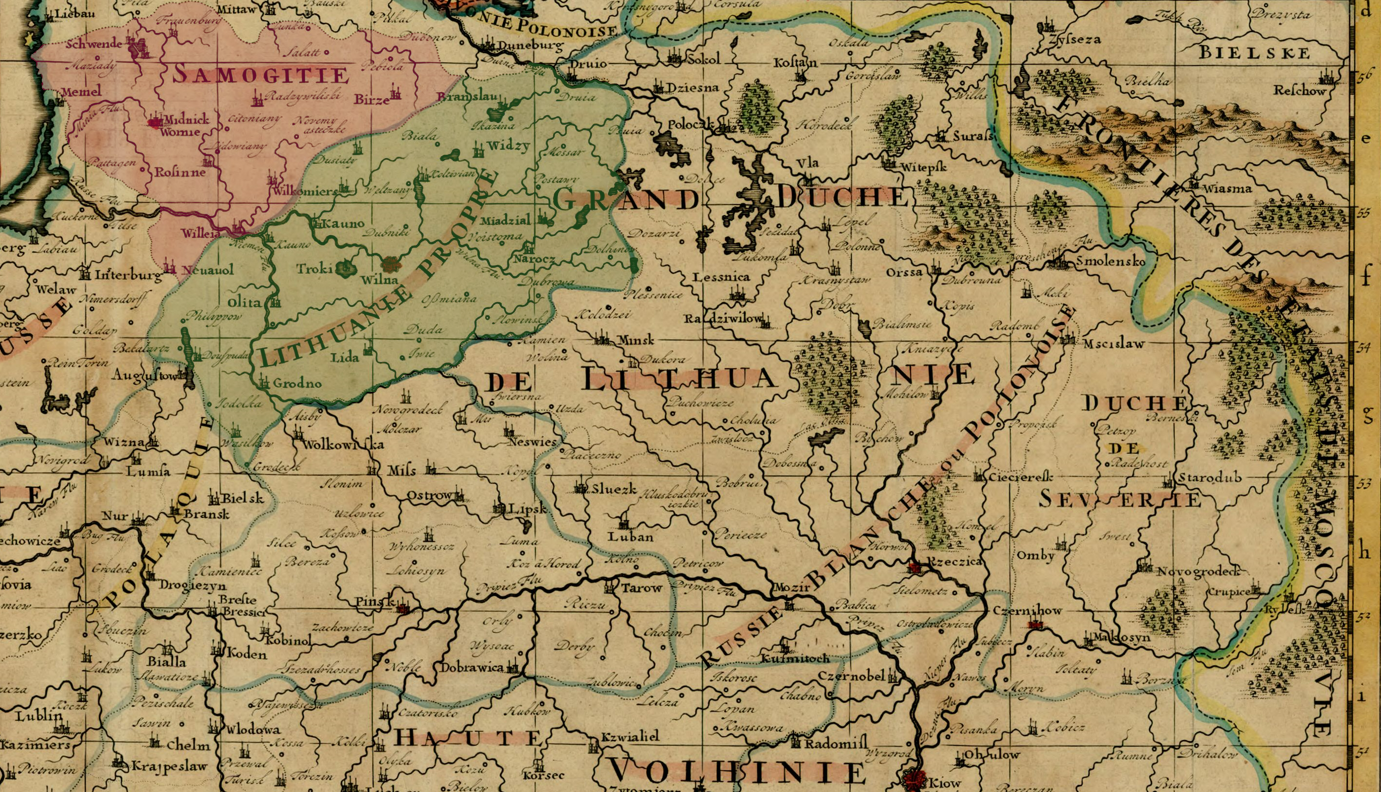
Lithuania proper (in green) and Samogitia (in red) within the Grand Duchy of Lithuania in a map from 1712

After the partitions of the Polish–Lithuanian Commonwealth in the 18th century, Samogitia was incorporated into the Russian Empire along with the rest of Lithuania. Samogitia was the main source of the Lithuanian cultural revival during the 19th century and was a focal point for the smuggling of books printed in the Lithuanian language, which was banned by the occupying Russians.

In 1883, Edmund Veckenstedt published a book Die Mythen, Sagen und Legenden der Zamaiten (Litauer) (English: The myths, sagas and legends of the Samogitians (Lithuanians)).

After World War I, Samogitia became a part of the newly re-established Lithuanian state. The Žemaičiai resisted the Bolsheviks and the Bermontians. During World War II, Lithuania was first occupied by the Soviet Union in 1940, then in 1941 by Nazi Germany, and in 1944 again by the USSR. The Soviet Union recognized the independence of Lithuania on 6 September 1991. The last Soviet troops withdrew in August 1993.

In 1945, the Soviets denied the existence of the Lithuania Minor ethnographic region, out of political advantage, and declared the Klaipėda region a part of Samogitia.

== Tourism ==
Tourist destinations in Samogitia include Palanga, Kretinga and Žemaičių Kalvarija. The majority of tourists come from Latvia, Poland, Belarus, Russia, Germany, Spain, Finland and Sweden.

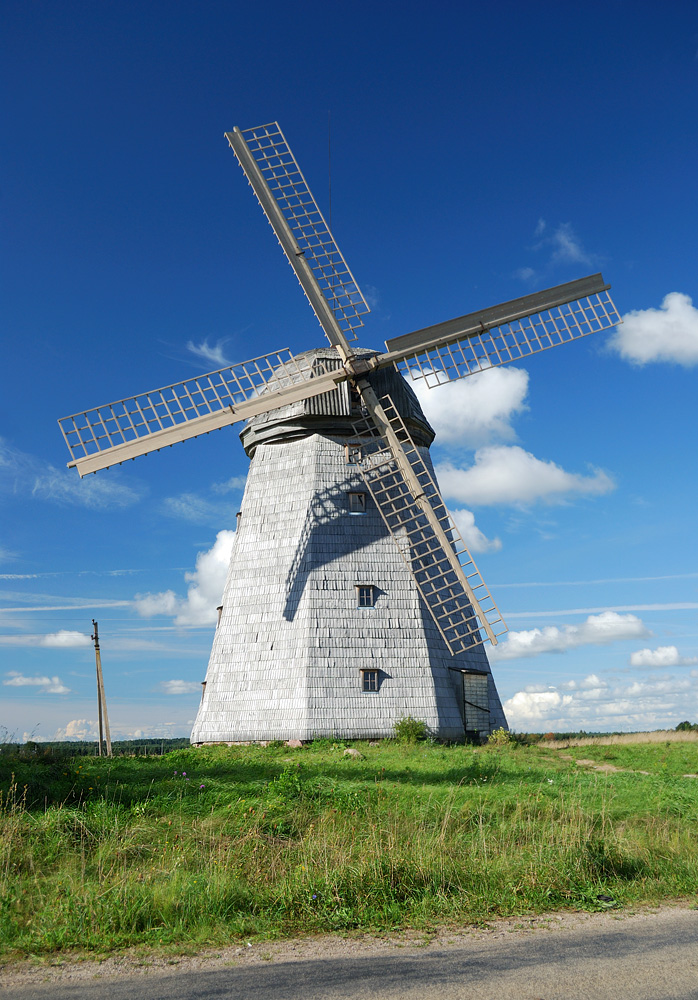
Windmill in Lazdininkai

Palanga is a tourist destination among tourists from the United Kingdom, Germany and Russia.

Žemaičių Kalvarija (or New Jerusalem as it used to be called) is visited by pilgrims from all around the world, due to its annual The Great Žemaičių Kalvarija Church Festival (usually in June or July).

== Politics ==
Samogitia historically was an autonomous region in the Grand Duchy of Lithuania, although it lost this status once Lithuania was annexed by the Russian Empire following the Third Partition of the Polish-Lithuanian Commonwealth in 1795 as a part of the Vilnius Governorate. In 1843, Samogitia was incorporated into the Kaunas Governorate, with a minor part attached to the Courland Governorate. Since then, Samogitia has not had a separate political status, but there were attempts to create a separate state during the uprising in February 1831.

Currently, Samogitia is represented by the Samogitian cultural society, a group interested in preserving Samogitian culture and language.

== Symbols ==
Small and greater coats of arms of Samogitia.
Variants of the Samogitian flag with small and greater coat of arms.

The coat of arms depicts a black bear with silver claws and a collar on a red shield topped with a crown. The greater arms are supported by a knight with a sword and a woman with an anchor and has the motto Patria Una (Latin: One Fatherland). The current emblazonment of the arms was created by artist Algis Kliševičius.

The flag of Samogitia depicts the coat of arms on a white background. It is a swallowtail flag. A variant of the flag charged with the greater coat of arms additionally has a red border around the flag.

Both symbols are assumed to have been used for centuries, especially the coat of arms (differing claims assert it was first used in the 14th or 16th centuries). The symbols were used by the Duchy of Samogitia. These are the oldest symbols of the Lithuanian ethnographic regions. On 21 July 1994, these symbols were recognized by the government of Lithuania. Following their adoption, there has been much controversy revolving around particular details of both the flag and coat of arms of Samogitia.

Because Žemaitija (Samogitia) does not correspond to any current administrative division of Lithuania, these symbols are not officially used anymore. However, the Samogitian bear was used in the coats of arms of Šiauliai County and Telšiai County. It also appears on the arms of the city of Šiauliai.

The emblem of the Lithuanian Armed Forces Motorized Infantry Brigade Žemaitija (Samogitia) is the griffin with a sword in his right hand and a shield, which features the Samogitian bear, in his left hand.

=== Gallery ===
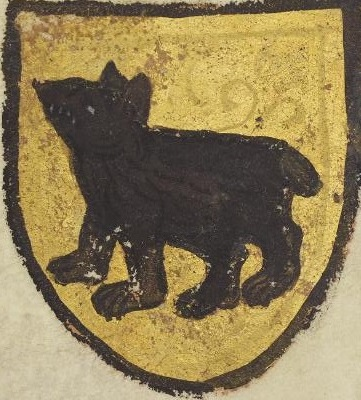
Coat of arms of Samogitia from the Council of Constance, 1416

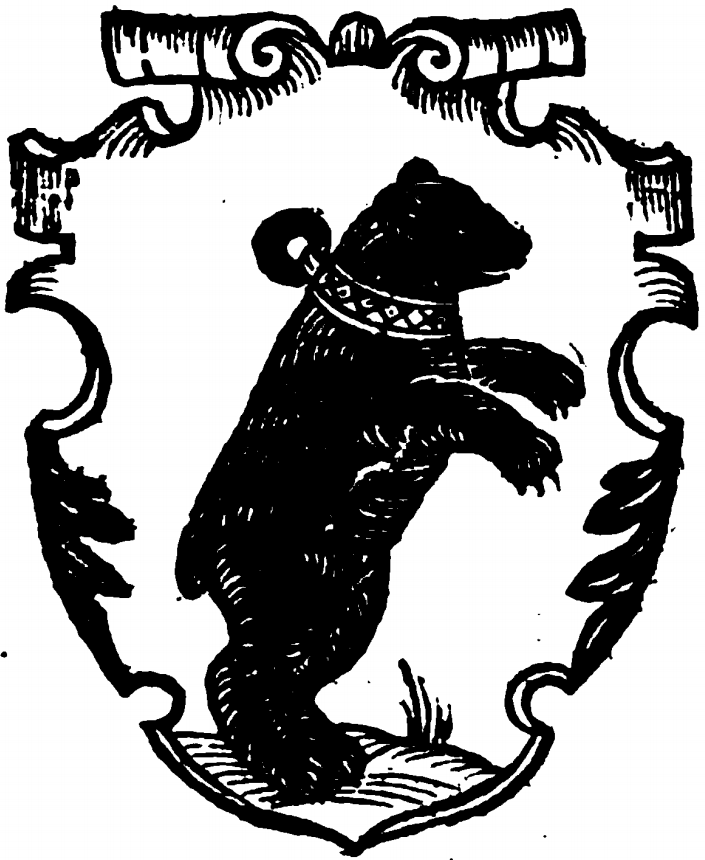
Coat of arms of Samogitia from Marcin Bielski's book Kronika Polska, 1597

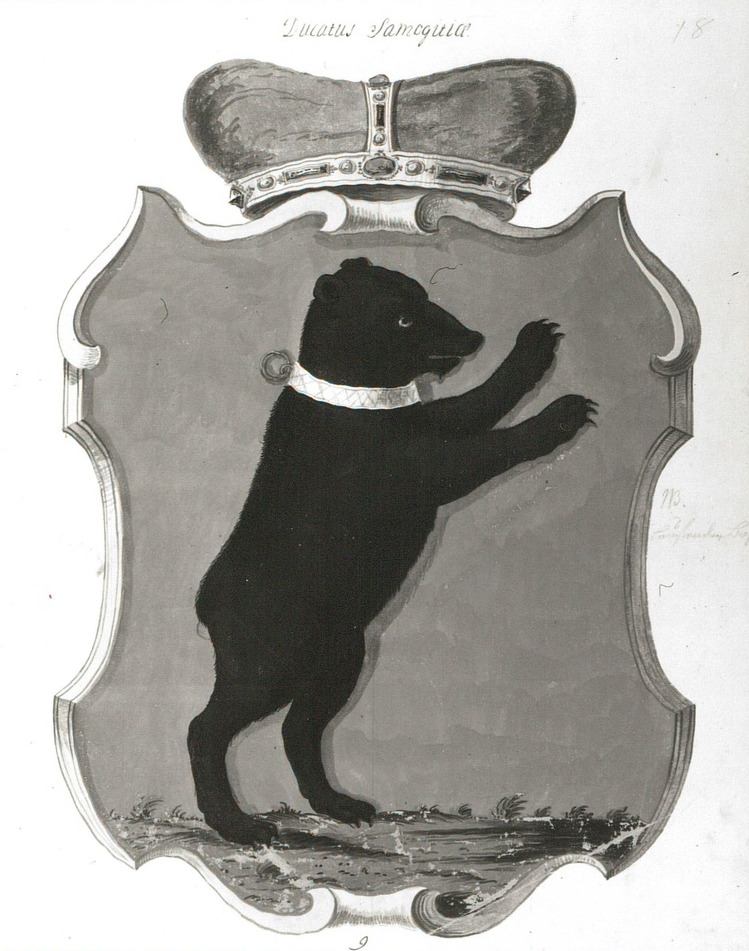
Coat of arms of Samogitia as depicted in 1720

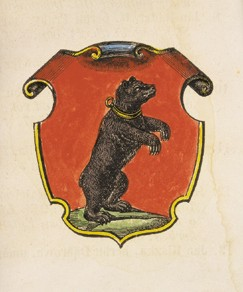
Coat of arms of Samogitia in the 18th century

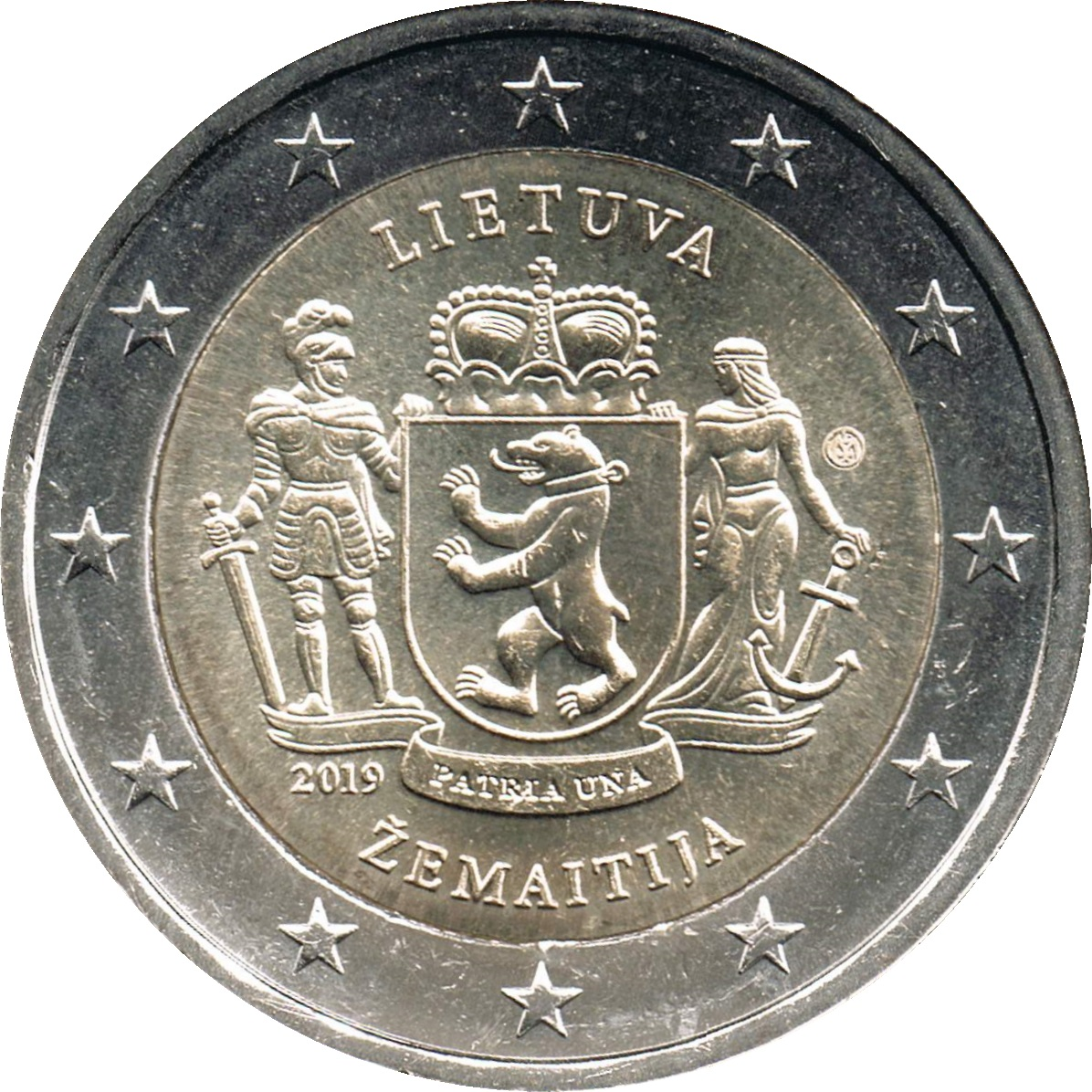
Coat of arms of Samogitia on a commemorative 2 euro coin released in 2019

Coat of arms of Šiauliai County

Coat of arms of Telšiai County

Coat of arms of Šiauliai

Emblem of the Samogitian Infantry Brigade

== See also ==
- Žemaitija National Park
- Aukštaitija
- Telšiai Bernardine Monastery

== Sources ==
- Drungila, Jonas (2019). Erelis lokio guolyje (in Lithuanian).
