= Aukštaitija =

Ethnographic region of Lithuania

- Ethnographic region
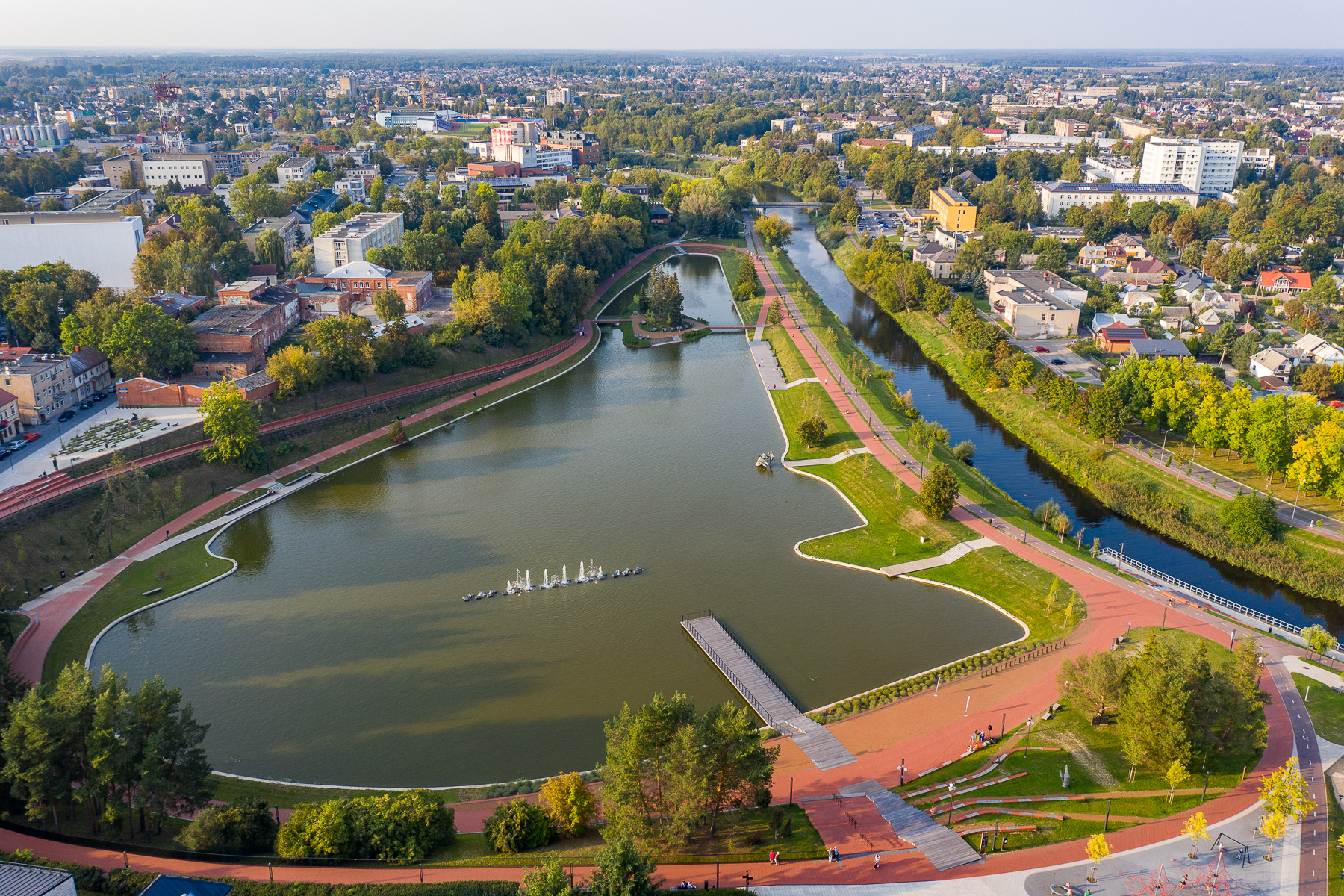
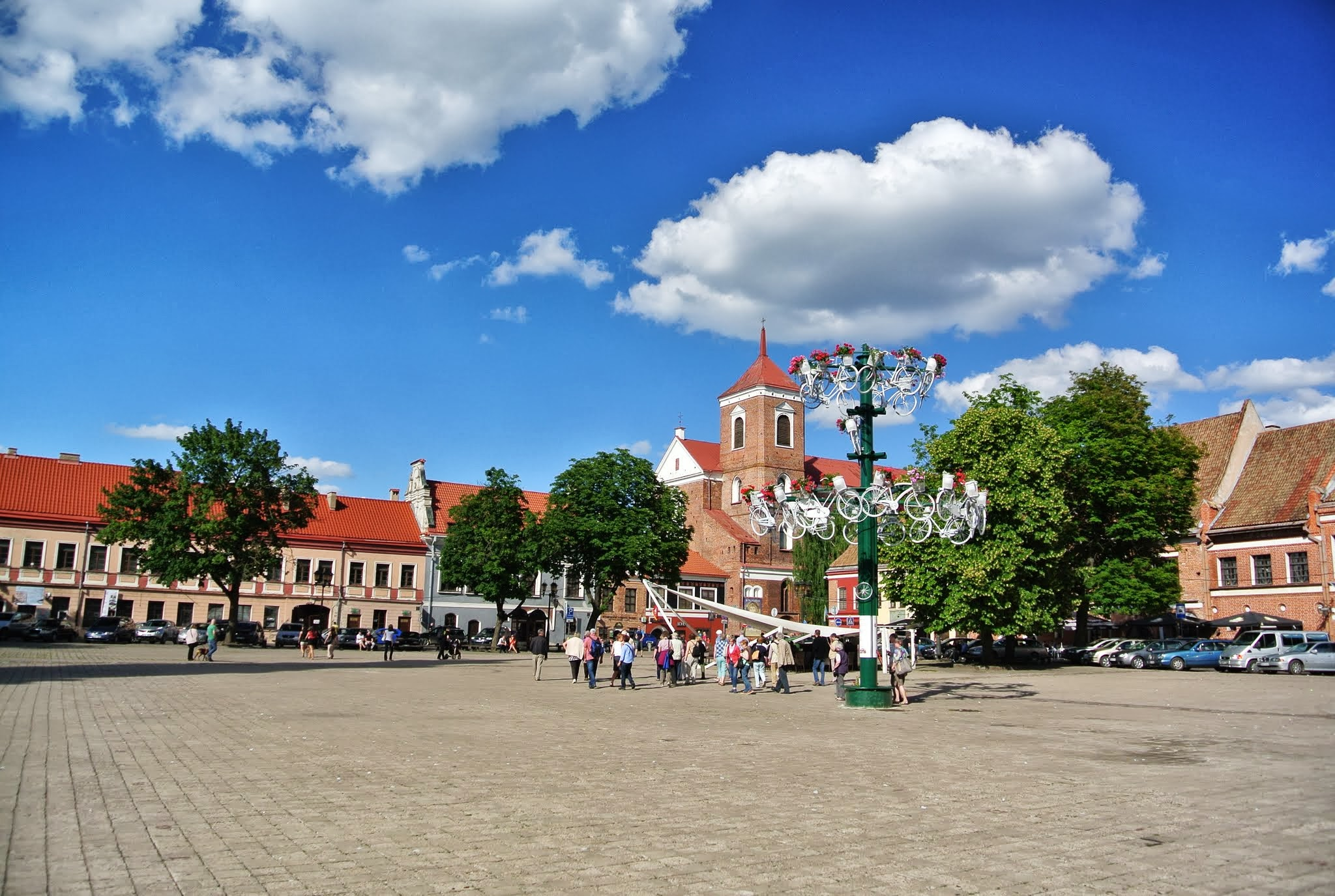
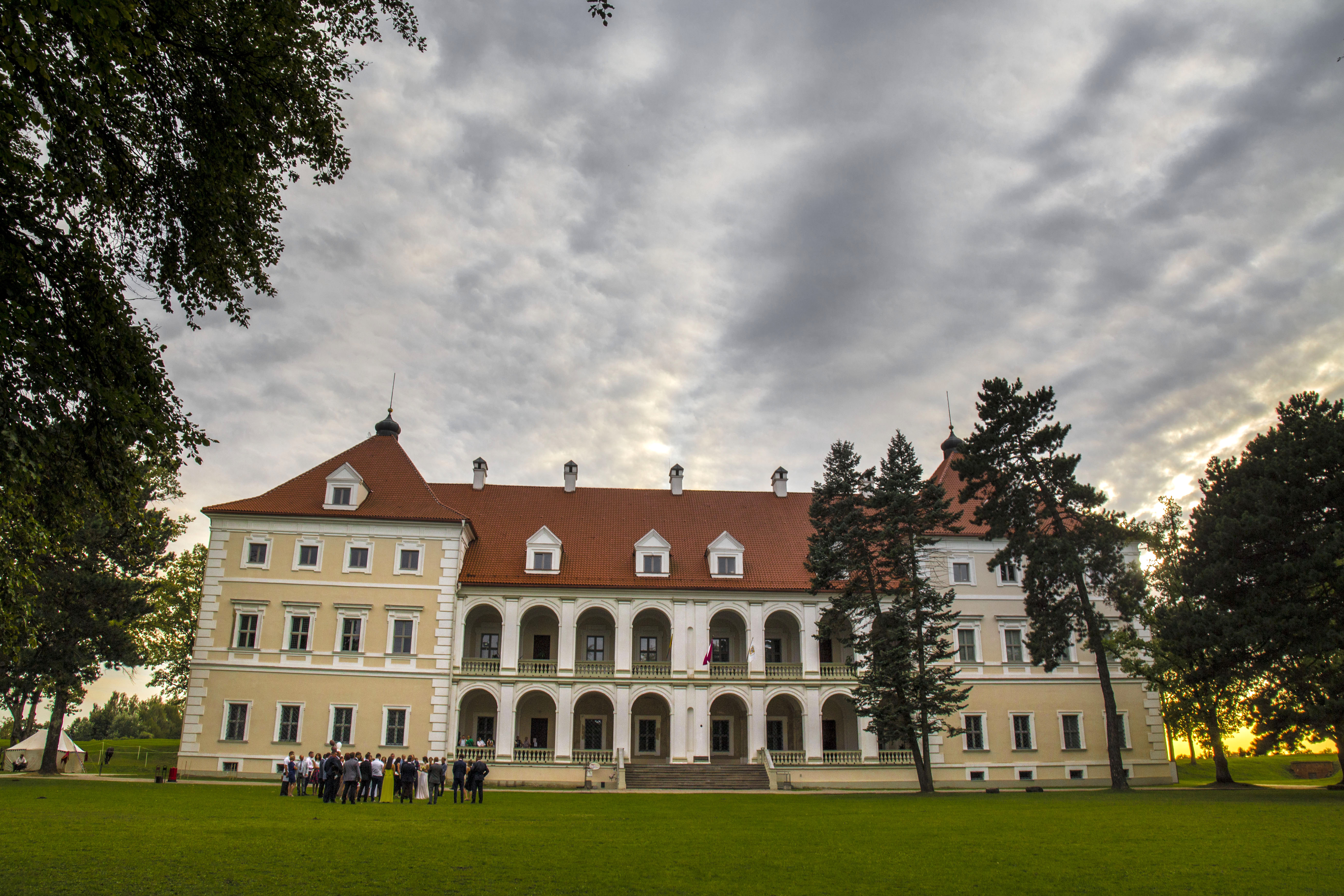
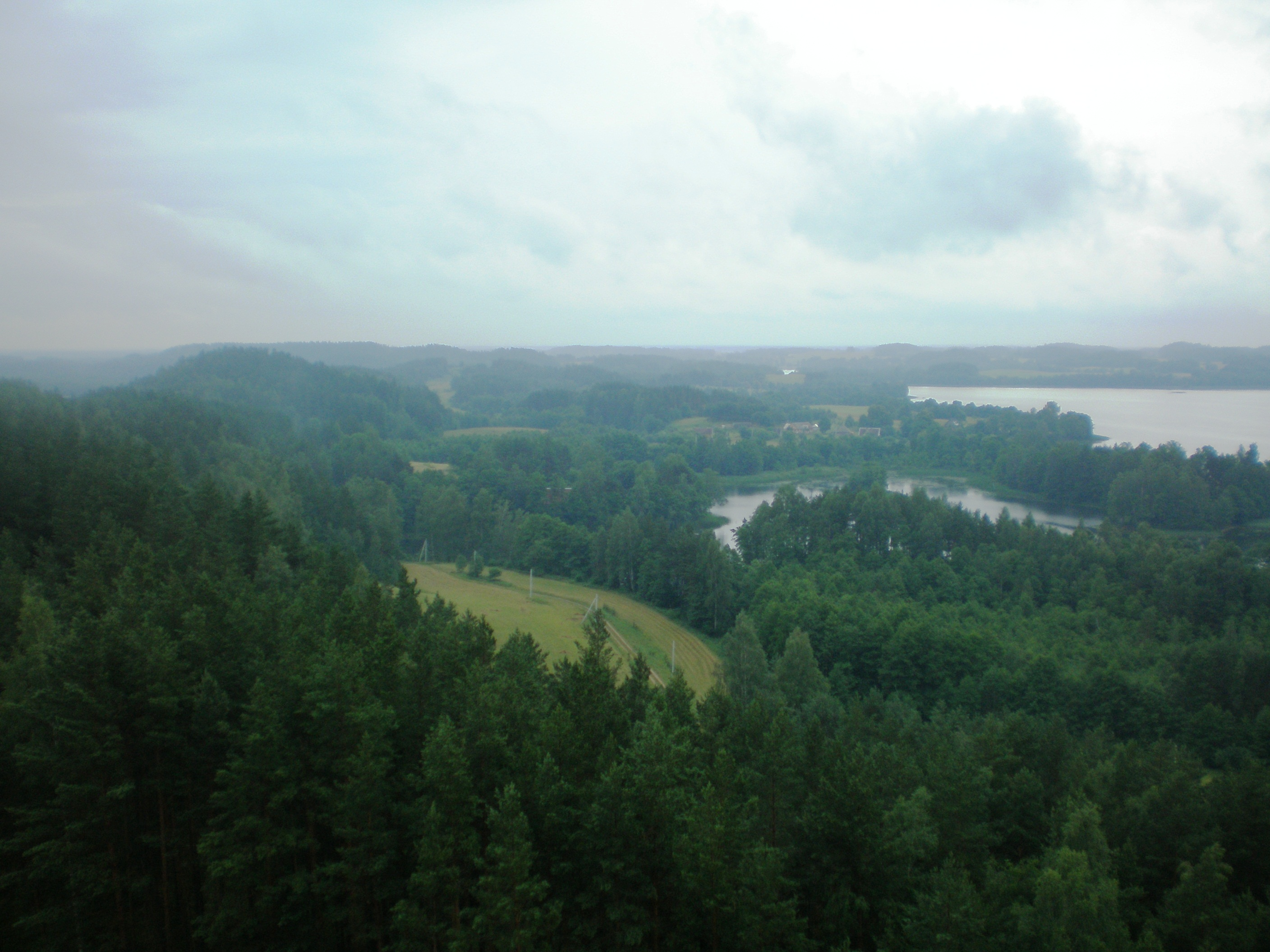
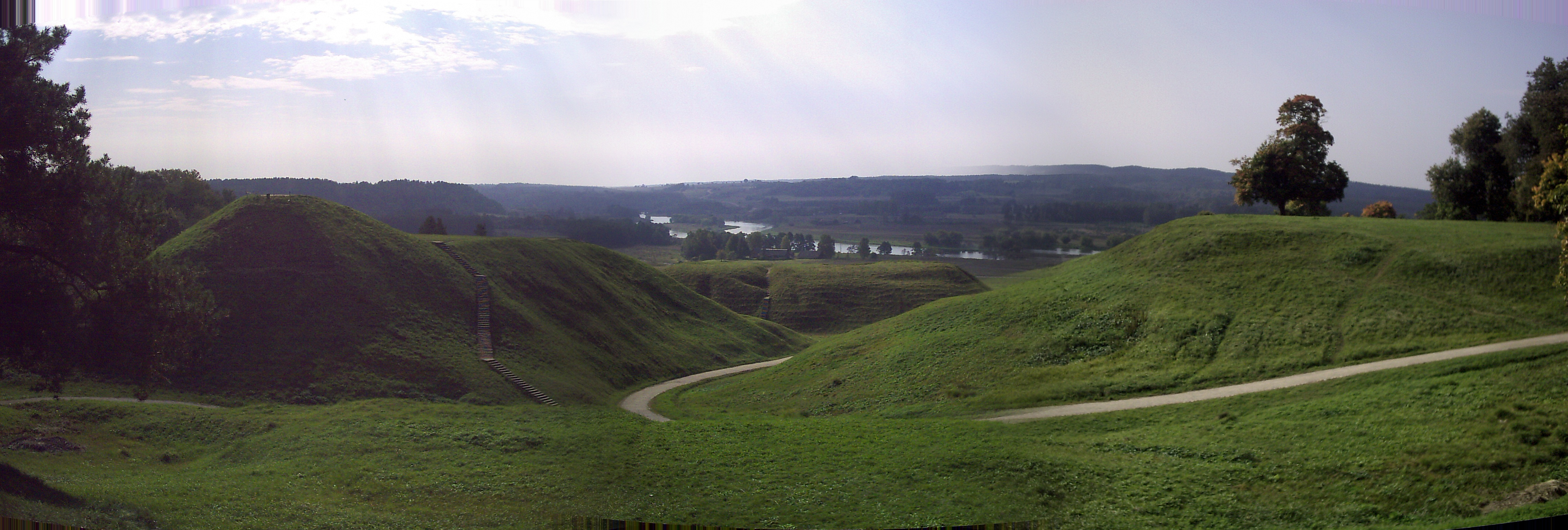
- From top, left to right: Panevėžys; Kaunas; Biržai Castle; Aukštaitija National Park; Hillforts in Kernavė

- Flag Coat of arms
- Motto: Patriam tuam mundum existima
- Location of Aukštaitija within Lithuania
- Country: Lithuania
- Capital and largest city: Panevėžys

Area
  - Total: 27,672 km^{2} (10,684 sq mi)

Population
  - Total: 919,212
  - Excluding Kaunas: 656,737
- Demonyms: Aukštaitian (English); aukštaitis (masc) and aukštaitė (fem) (Lithuanian)
- Time zone: UTC2 (CET (GMT +2))

Aukštaitija (Lithuanian pronunciation: [ɐukʃˈtɐǐːtʲɪjɐ]; literally Highland or Upland) is the name of one of five ethnographic regions of Lithuania. The name comes from the fact that the lands are in the upper basin of the Nemunas, as opposed to the Lowlands that begin from Šiauliai westward. Although Kaunas is surrounded by Aukštaitija, the city itself is not considered to be a part of any ethnographic region in most cases.

== Geography ==
Aukštaitija is in the northeast part of Lithuania and also encompasses a small part of Latvia and Belarus. The largest city located entirely within this region, Panevėžys, is considered to be the capital, though not in a political sense. Sometimes Utena is regarded as a symbolical capital.

The largest cities by population are:

- Panevėžys – 84,587
- Jonava – 26,423
- Utena – 25,397
- Kėdainiai – 22,677
- Ukmergė – 20,154
- Visaginas – 18,024
- Radviliškis – 15,161

The region has many lakes, mainly on the eastern side.

== Subdivisions ==
Subdivision	Note
Utena County	entire county
Panevėžys County	entire county
Širvintos District Municipality	entire municipality
Ukmergė District Municipality	entire municipality
Kaišiadorys District Municipality	entire municipality
Jonava District Municipality	entire municipality
Kėdainiai District Municipality	entire municipality
Radviliškis District Municipality	entire municipality
Pakruojis District Municipality	entire municipality
Joniškis District Municipality	entire municipality
Šiauliai District Municipality	Meškuičiai Eldership, Ginkūnai Eldership and Kairiai Eldership
Kaunas District Municipality	Neveronys, Karmėlava Eldership, Karmėlava Eldership, Lapės Eldership, Domeikava Eldership, Vandžiogala Eldership, Užliedžiai Eldership, Babtai Eldership, Kačerginė, Raudondvaris Eldership, Vilkija, Vilkija Area Eldership and Čekiškė Eldership
Švenčionys District Municipality	Adutiškis Eldership, Svirkos Eldership, Švenčionys Eldership, Švenčionėliai Eldership, Kaltanėnai Eldership and Labanoras Eldership

== History ==
"We do not know on whose merits or guilt such a decision was made, or with what we have offended Your Lordship so much that Your Lordship has deservedly been directed against us, creating hardship for us everywhere. First of all, you made and announced a decision about the land of Samogitia, which is our inheritance and our homeland from the legal succession of the ancestors and elders. We still own it, it is and has always been the same Lithuanian land, because there is one language and the same inhabitants. But since the land of Samogitia is located lower than the land of Lithuania, it is called Samogitia, because in Lithuanian it is called lower land [Žemaitija]. And the Samogitians call Lithuania Aukštaitija, that is, from the Samogitian point of view, a higher land. Also, the people of Samogitia have long called themselves Lithuanians and never Samogitians, and because of such identity (sic), we do not write about Samogitia in our letter, because everything is one: one country and the same inhabitants."

— Vytautas the Great, excerpt from his 11 March 1420 Latin-written letter sent to Sigismund, Holy Roman Emperor, in which he described the core of the Grand Duchy of Lithuania, composed of Žemaitija (lowlands) and Aukštaitija (highlands). The term Aukštaitija has been known since the 13th century.

Historically, Aukštaitija corresponded to the Duchy of Lithuania until the 13th century. Its initial capital was most likely Kernavė. In the 1322 treaty of Gediminas, Aukštaitija was called terra Eustoythen (land of Aukštaitians). Some German sources also titled Grand Duke Gediminas, after whom the Gediminids dynasty is named, Rex de Owsteiten (King of Aukštaitija). Aukštaitija was mentioned as Austechia in Chronicon terrae Prussiae, written around 1326. Politically, from the end of the 13th century, it comprised the Duchy of Vilnius/Lithuania and the Duchy of Trakai, and it is possible that the term was then used to refer to both of them. Since the 15th century, the Trakai and Vilnius voivodeships made up Aukštaitija, a political and ethnic entity also known as Lithuania proper.

== Demographics ==
The local people mainly speak the Aukštaitian dialect of Lithuanian. Under the new classification of dialects, Lithuanian is divided into only two dialects, Aukštaitian and Samogitian, with all other varieties now classified as subdialects. The Sudovian and Dzūkian dialects are also considered subdialects of Aukštaitian; the specific subdialect spoken in Aukštaitija is thus known as East Aukštaitian.

The region has Russian and Belarusian minorities in the east. The subdialects spoken there use more loanwords from those languages. However, the usage of dialects in the region, as in Lithuania in general, is declining.

== See also ==
- Aukštaitija National Park
- Samogitia
