= Gardamas Eldership =

Gardamas Eldership Gardamo seniūnija
- Eldership
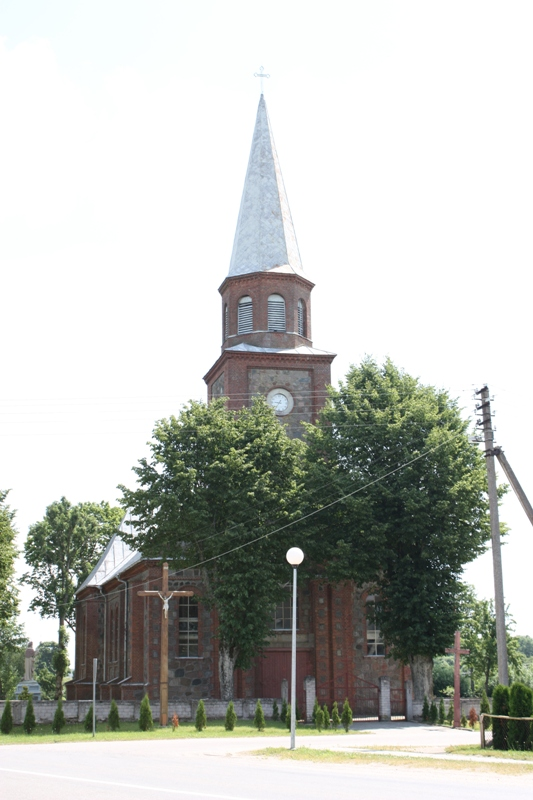
- Church in Gardamas

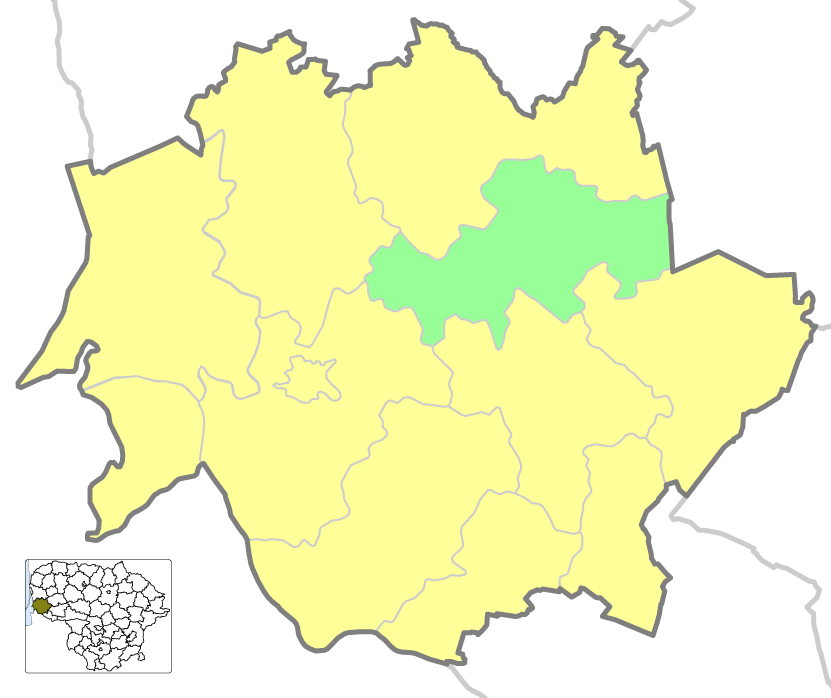
- Location of Gardamas Eldership
- Coordinates: 55.434°N 21.708°E
- Country: Lithuania
- Ethnographic region: Samogitia
- County: Klaipėda County
- Municipality: Šilutė District Municipality
- Administrative centre: Gardamas

Area
  - Total: 134 km^{2} (52 sq mi)

Population (2021)
  - Total: 1,519
  - Density: 11.3/km^{2} (29.4/sq mi)
- Time zone: UTC+2 (EET)
  - Summer (DST): UTC+3 (EEST)

Gardamas Eldership (Lithuanian: Gardamo seniūnija) is a Lithuanian eldership, located in the eastern part of Šilutė District Municipality.
