= Karmėlava Eldership =

Karmėlava Eldership Karmėlavos seniūnija
- Eldership
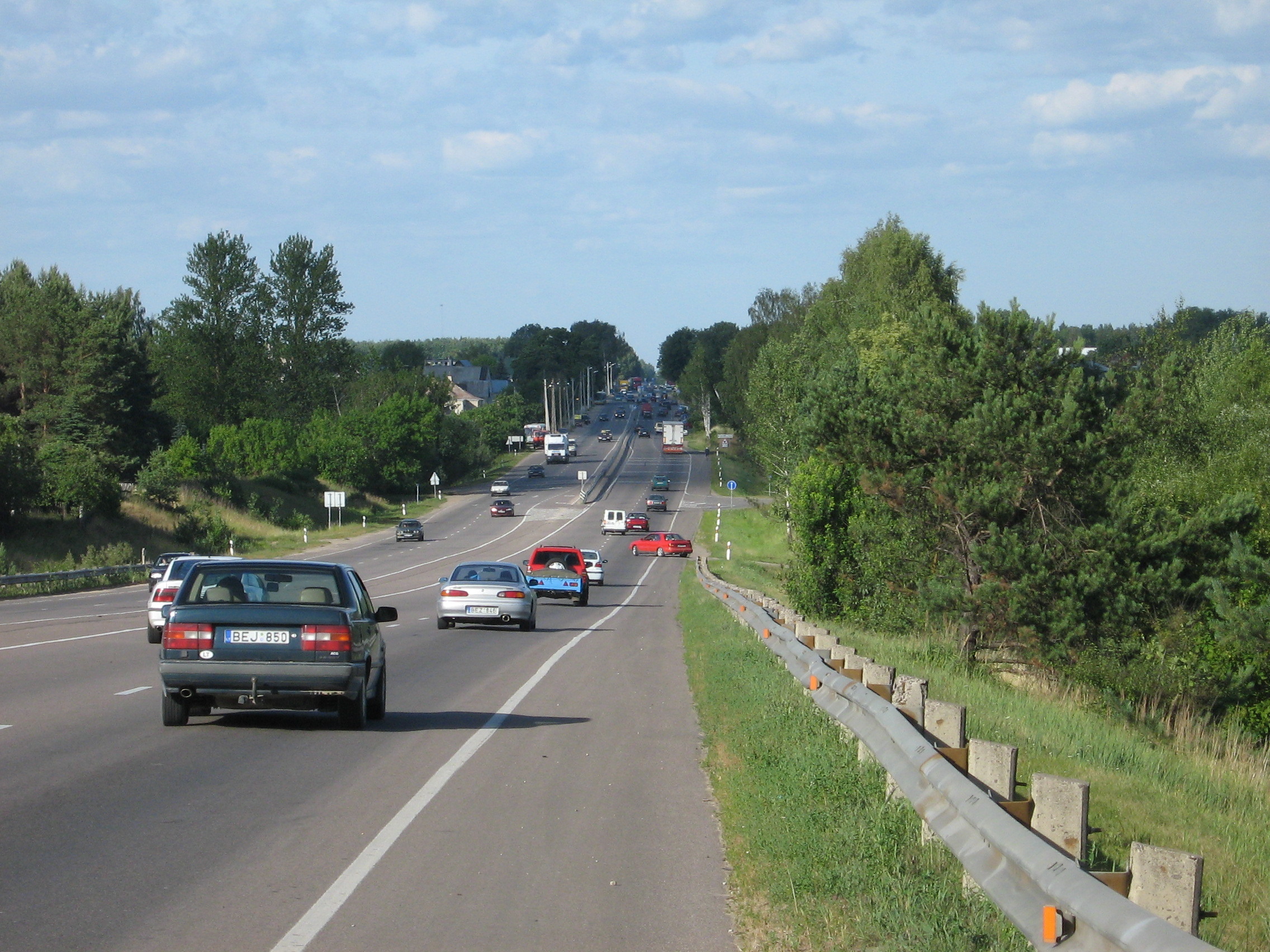
- Road to Karmėlava

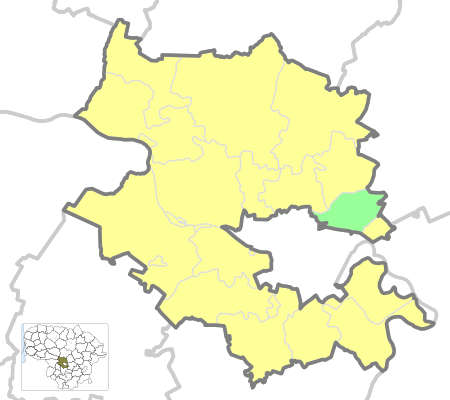
- Location of Karmėlava Eldership
- Coordinates: 54.954°N 24.048°E
- Country: Lithuania
- Ethnographic region: Aukštaitija
- County: Kaunas County
- Municipality: Kaunas District Municipality
- Administrative centre: Karmėlava

Area
  - Total: 44 km^{2} (17 sq mi)

Population (2021)
  - Total: 6,265
  - Density: 140/km^{2} (370/sq mi)
- Time zone: UTC+2 (EET)
  - Summer (DST): UTC+3 (EEST)

Karmėlava Eldership (Lithuanian: Karmėlavos seniūnija) is a Lithuanian eldership, located in the eastern part of Kaunas District Municipality.
