= Kernavė Mounds =

Archaeological site in Lithuania

Coordinates: 54.8826°N 24.8513°E

Kernave hillforts:
1 Mindaugas Throne hillforts
2 Altar hillforts
3 Castle hillforts
4 Lizdeika hillforts
5 Kriveikiškis Hillfort

The Kernavė hillforts (Lithuanian: Kernavės piliakalniai, Kernavė hillforts) are five hillforts at the southern edge of Kernavė (Širvintos District, Aukštaitija, Lithuania) in the Pajauta Valley on the right side of the Neris valley. Kernavė is the oldest known (but not the first) capital of Grand Duchy of Lithuania. Since 1989 the site is part of the Kernavė State Cultural Reserve, added to the Unesco World Heritage List in 2004. It includes the following hillforts:

- Lizdeika Hillfort
- Mindaugas Throne Hillfort
- Altar Hillfort
- Castle hill Hillfort
- Kriveikiškis Hillfort, located some 0.4 km away from the close group of the four other hillforts, on the right bank of the Kernavėlė Stream.

== Gallery ==
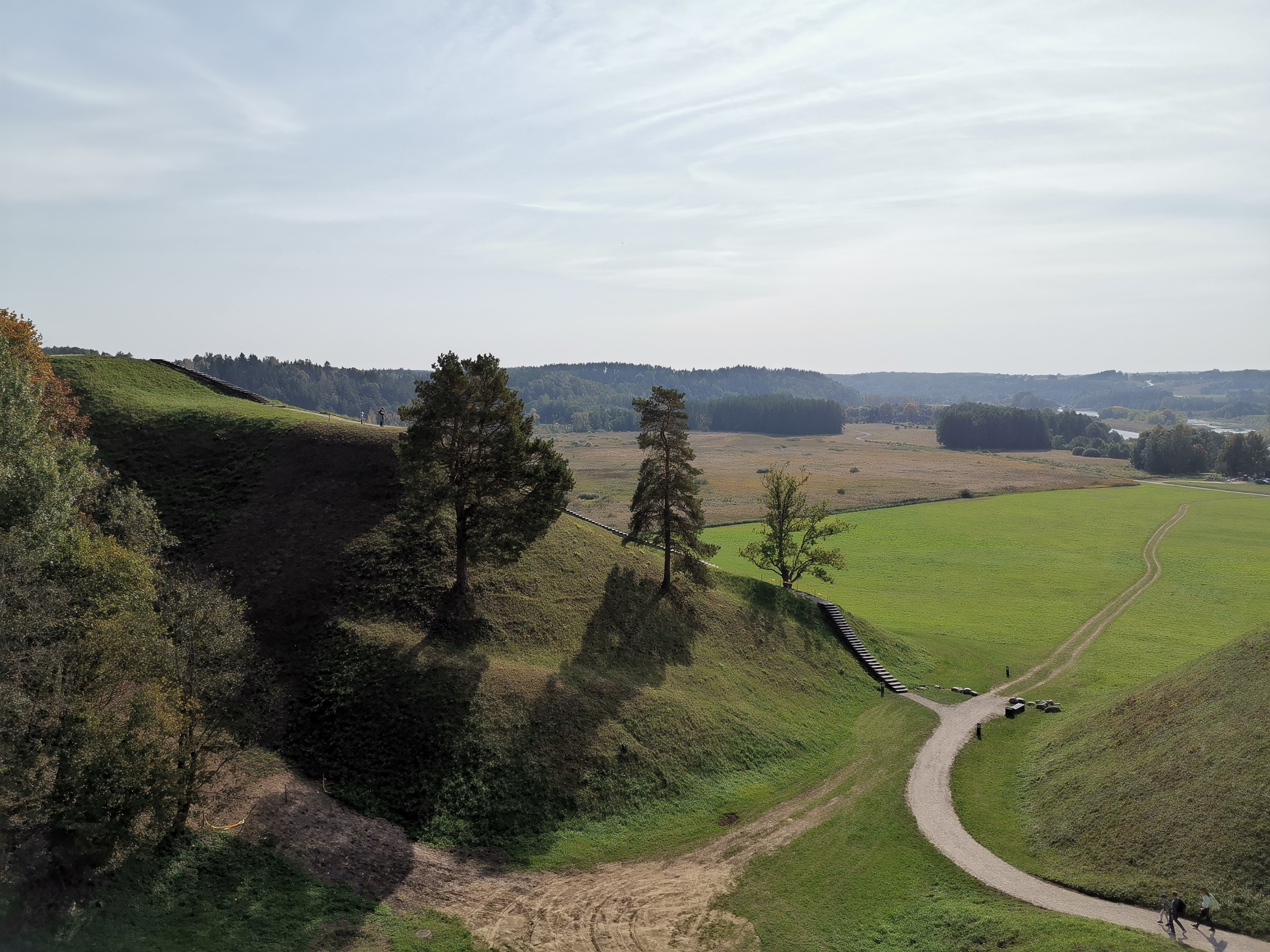
Kernavė hillforts

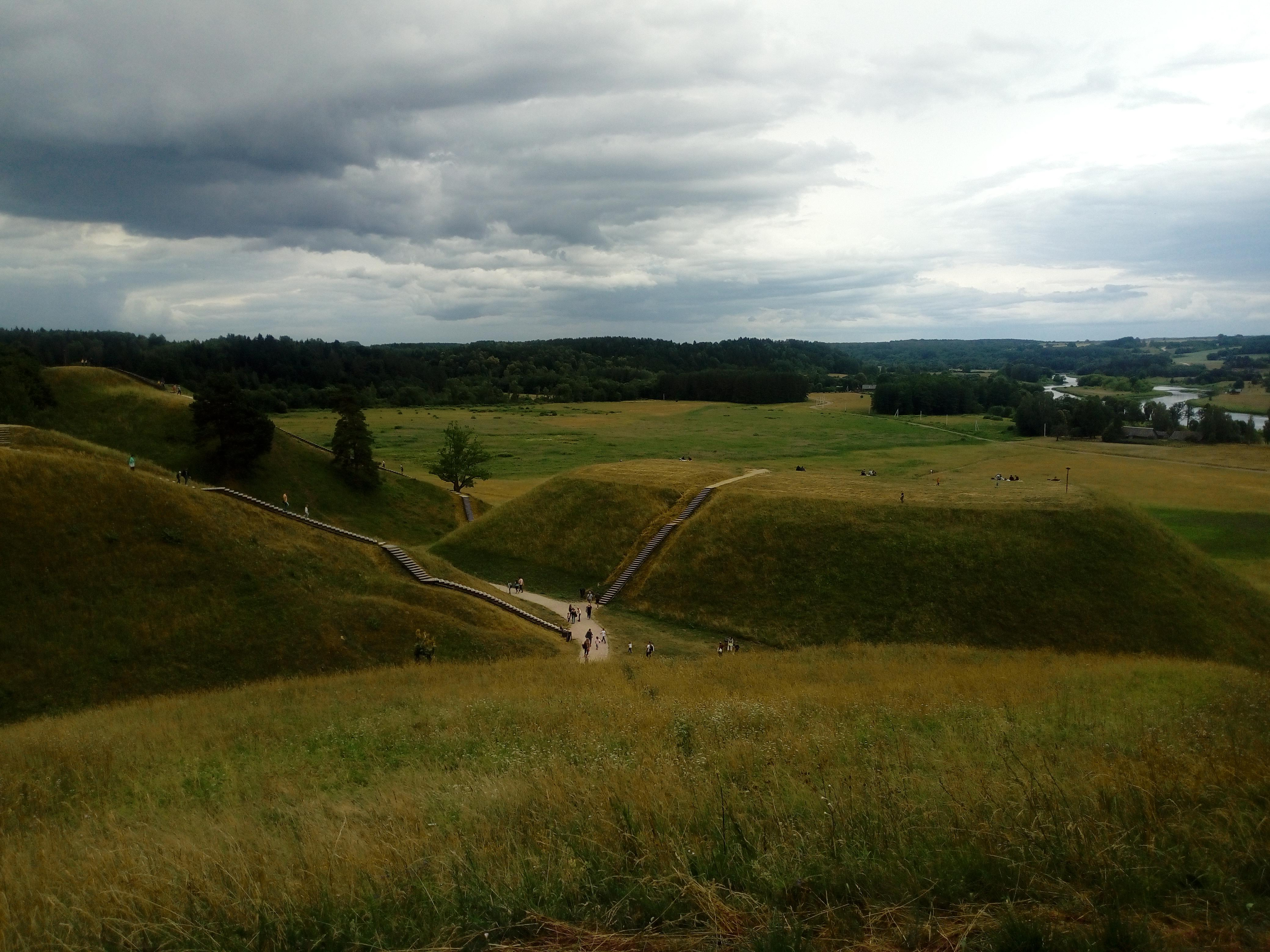
Valley view

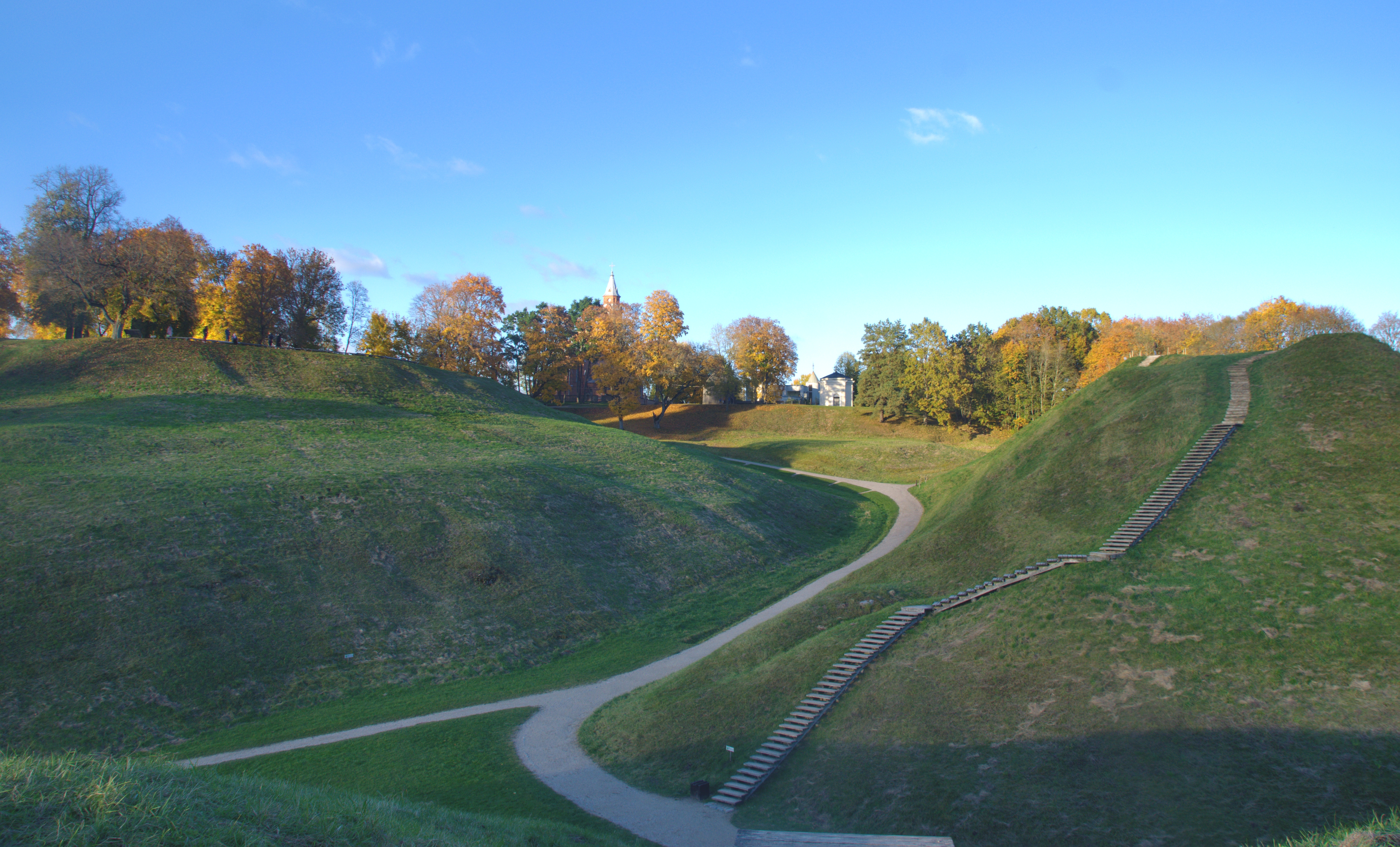
view from Altar Hillfort

== See also ==
- List of hillforts in Lithuania
