= Žemaičių Naumiestis Eldership =

Eldership of Lithuania

Coordinates: 55.3592°N 21.7032°E

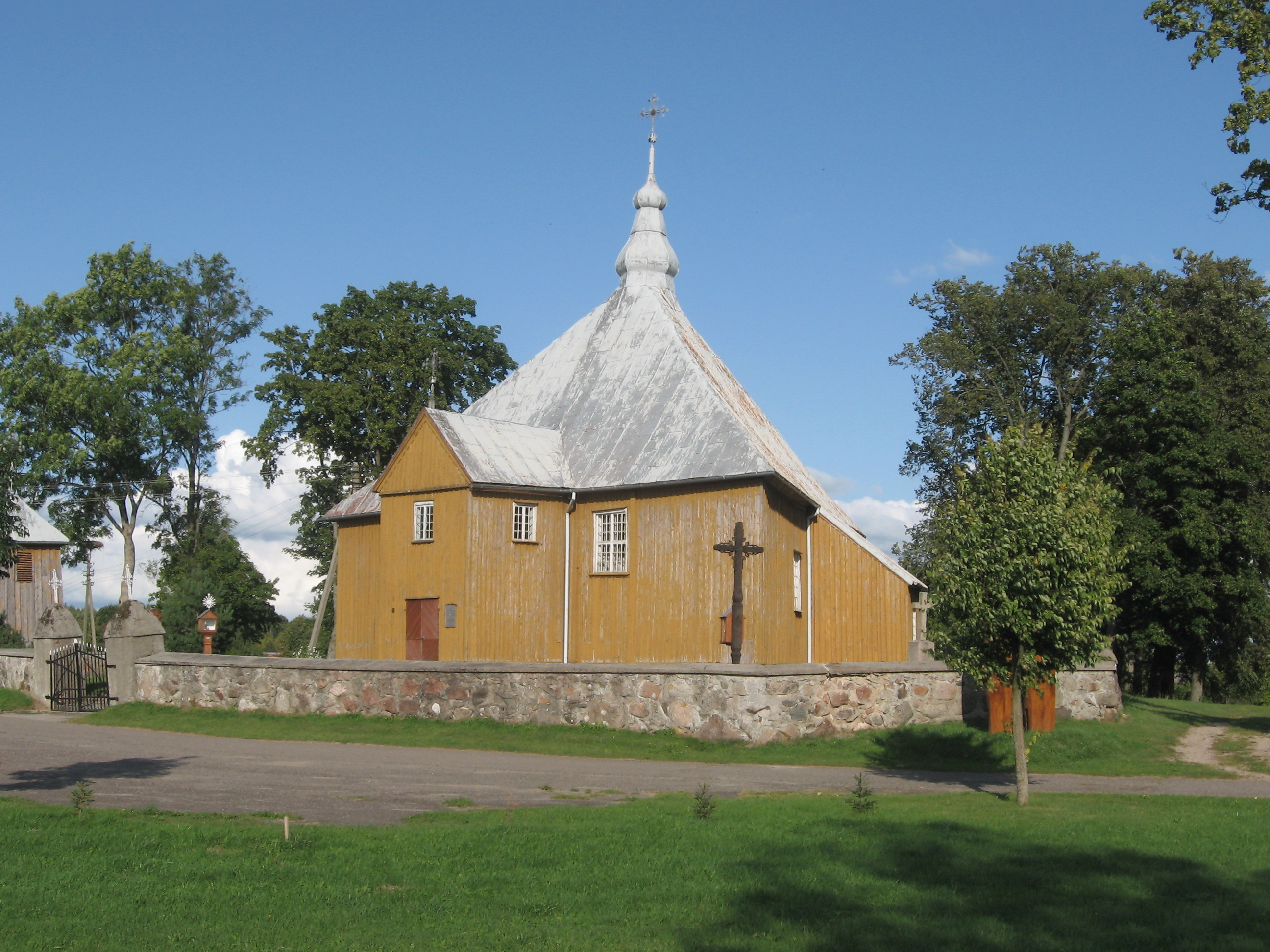
Village home

The Žemaičių Naumiestis Eldership (Lithuanian: Žemaičių Naumiesčio seniūnija) is an eldership of Lithuania, located in the Šilutė District Municipality. In 2021 its population was 2716.
