= Vainutas Eldership =

Eldership of Lithuania

The Vainutas Eldership (Lithuanian: Vainuto seniūnija) is an eldership of Lithuania, located in the Šilutė District Municipality. In 2021 its population was 1728.
