= Smalininkai Eldership =

Eldership of Lithuania

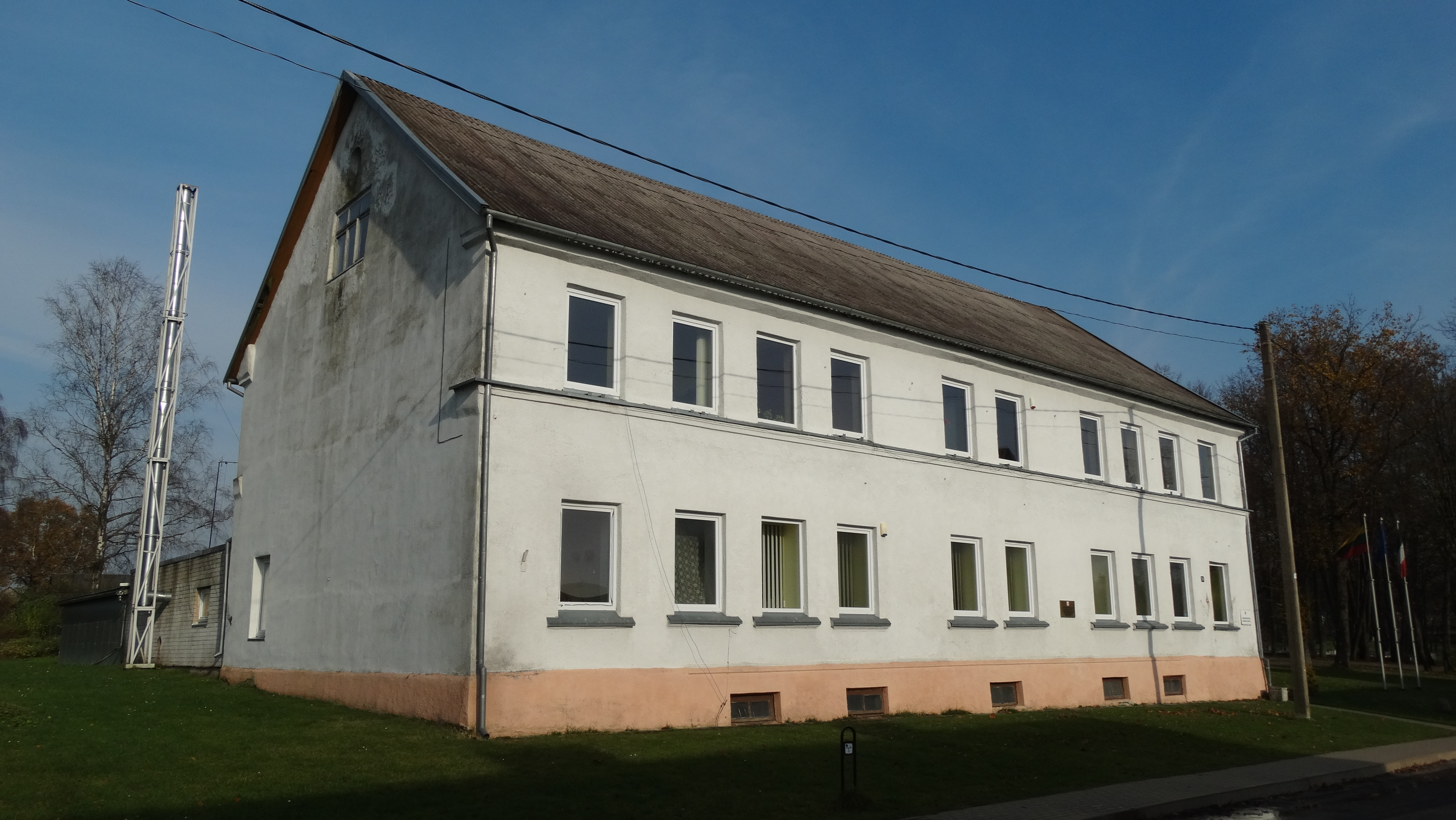
Smalininkai eldership, Jurbarkas District, Lithuania

The Smalininkai Eldership (Lithuanian: Smalininkų seniūnija) is an eldership of Lithuania, located in the Jurbarkas District Municipality. In 2021 its population was 1052.
