= Viešvilė Eldership =

Eldership of Lithuania

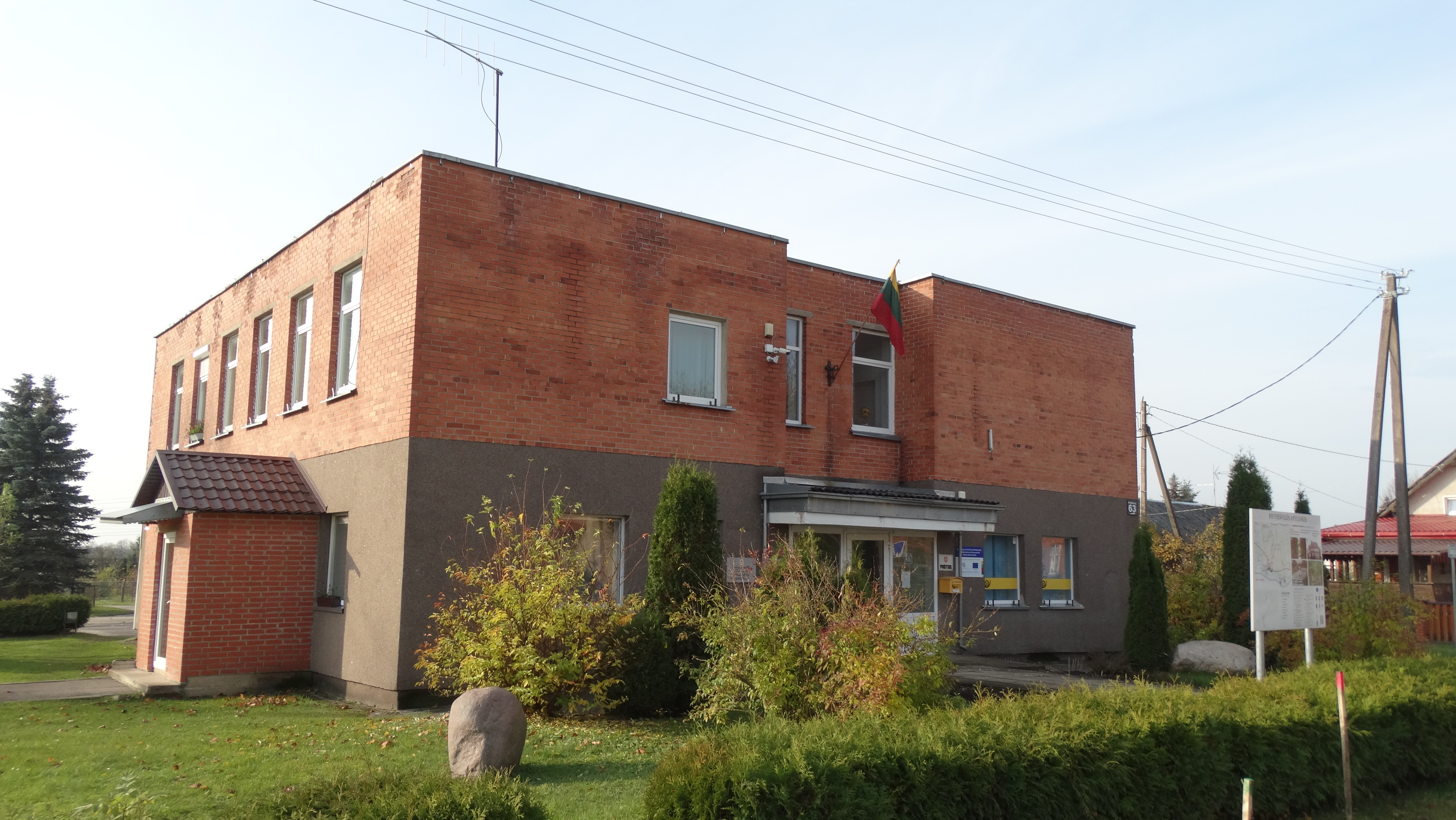
Viešvilė Eldership, Jurbarkas District, Lithuania

The Viešvilė Eldership (Lithuanian: Viešvilės seniūnija) is an eldership of Lithuania, located in the Jurbarkas District Municipality. In 2021 its population was 815.
