= Ginkūnai Eldership =

Eldership of Lithuania

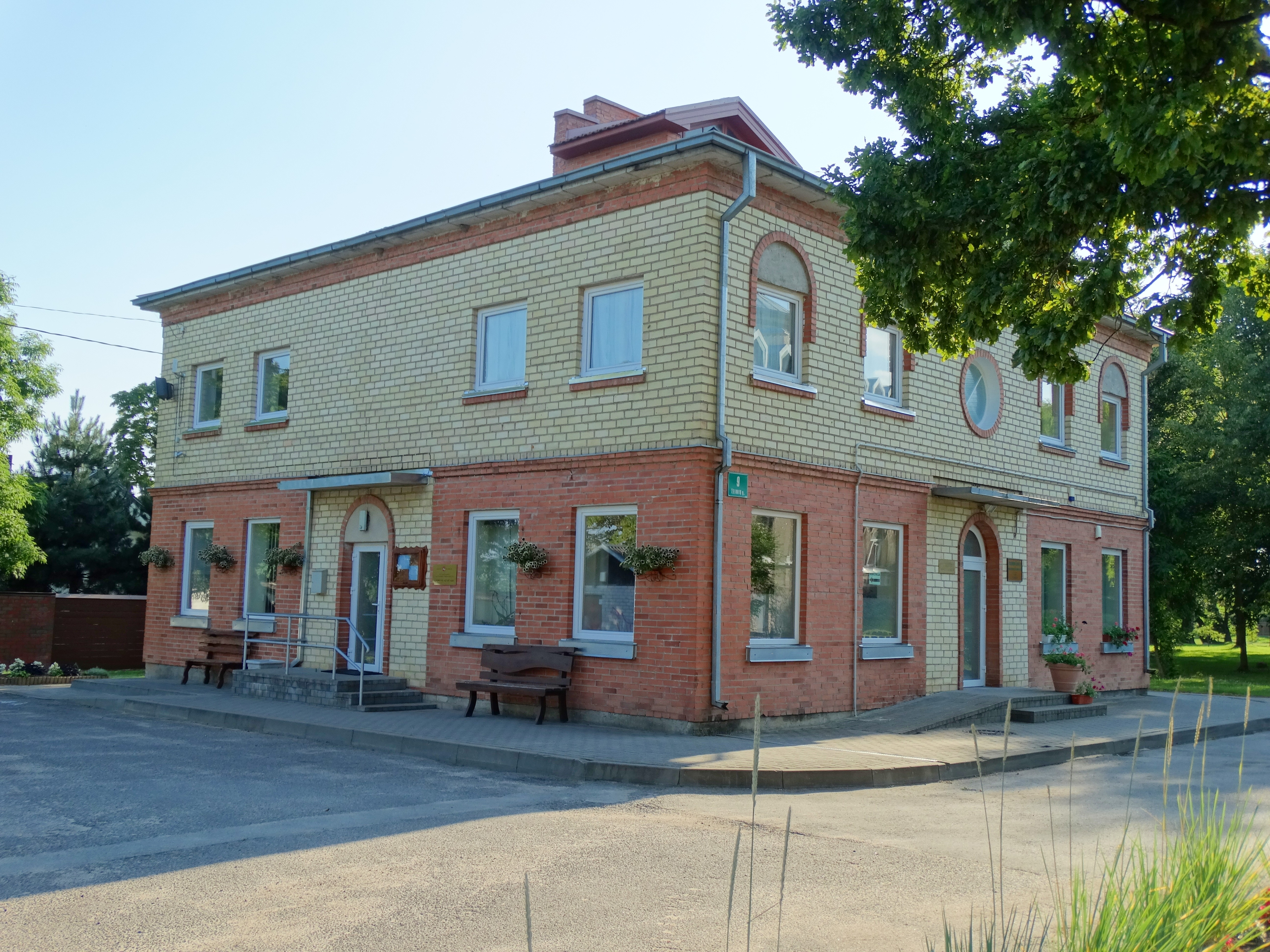
Ginkūnai, seniūnija

The Ginkūnai Eldership (Lithuanian: Ginkūnų seniūnija) is an eldership of Lithuania, located in the Šiauliai District Municipality. In 2021 its population was 3294.
