= Kairiai Eldership =

Eldership of Lithuania

The Kairiai Eldership (Lithuanian: Kairių seniūnija) is an eldership of Lithuania, located in the Šiauliai District Municipality. In 2021, its population was 3021.
