= Meškuičiai Eldership =

Eldership of Lithuania

The Meškuičiai Eldership (Lithuanian: Meškuičių seniūnija) is an eldership of Lithuania, located in the Šiauliai District Municipality. In 2021 its population was 1781.
