= Giraitė (Varėna) =

- Village
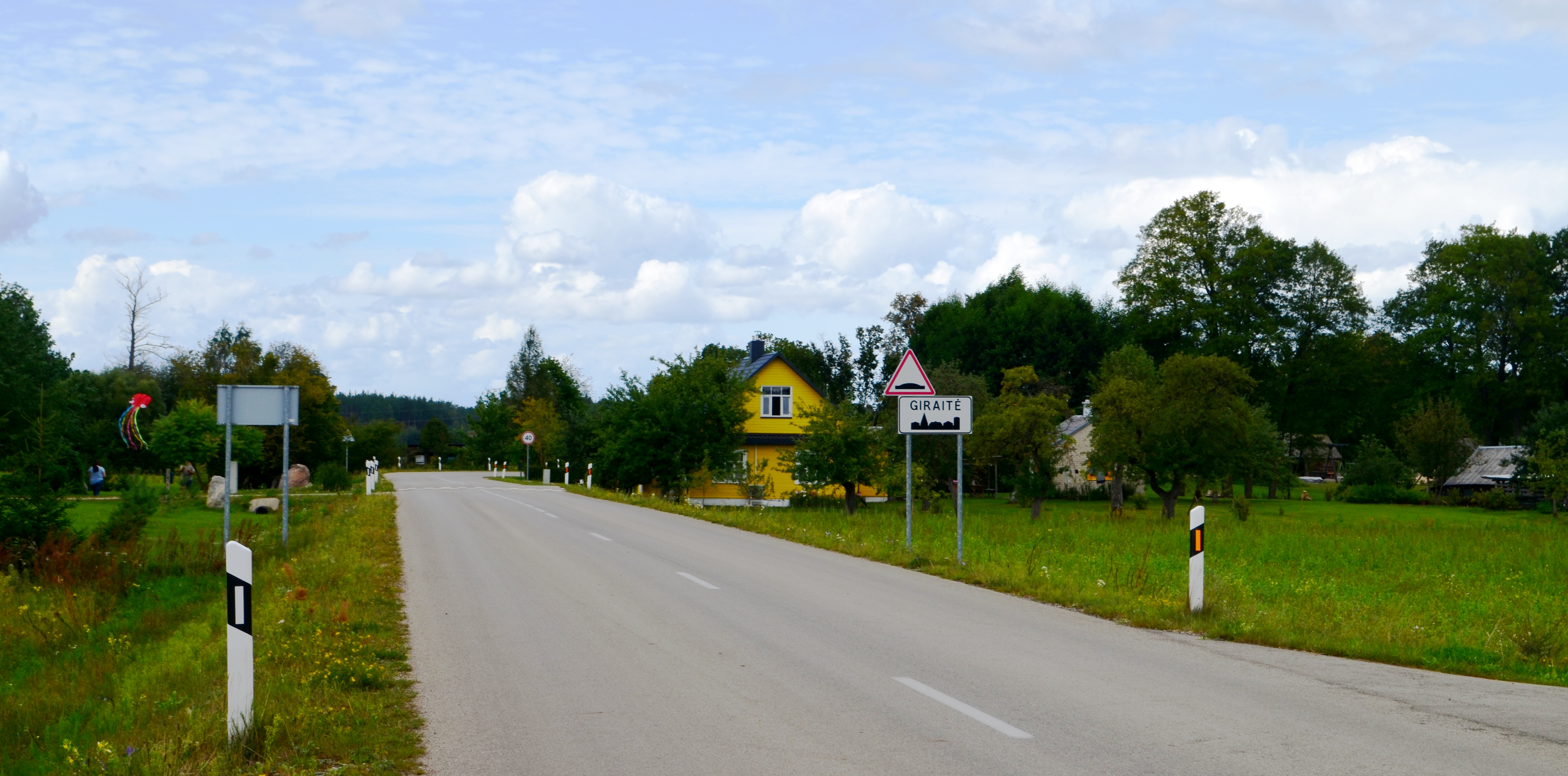

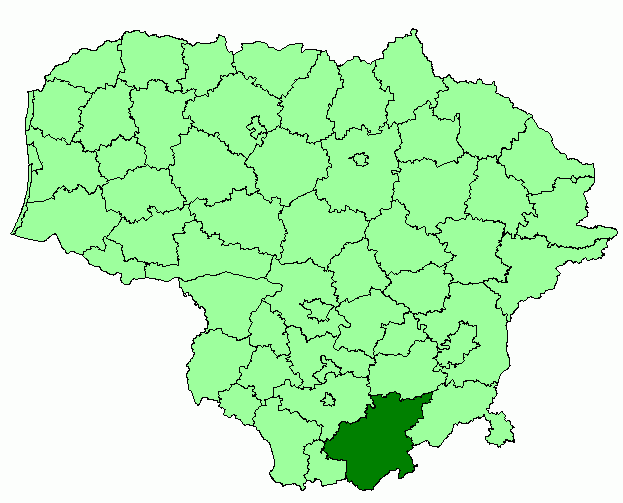
- Location in Varėna district municipality Location of Varėna district in Lithuania
- Coordinates: 54°16′26″N 24°39′32″E
- Country: Lithuania
- County: Alytus
- Municipality: Varėna
- Eldership: Matuizų

Population (2011 Census)
  - Total: 61
- Time zone: UTC+2 (EET)
  - Summer (DST): UTC+3 (EEST)

Giraitė is a village in Matuizų eldership, Varėna district municipality, Alytus County, southeastern Lithuania. According to the 2011 Census, the population was 61, down from 89 at the 2001 census.

== Etymology ==
The name Giraitė comes from a word Lithuanian: giraitė 'a little grove'.
