= Matuizos Eldership =

Matuizos Eldership Matuizų seniūnija
- Eldership
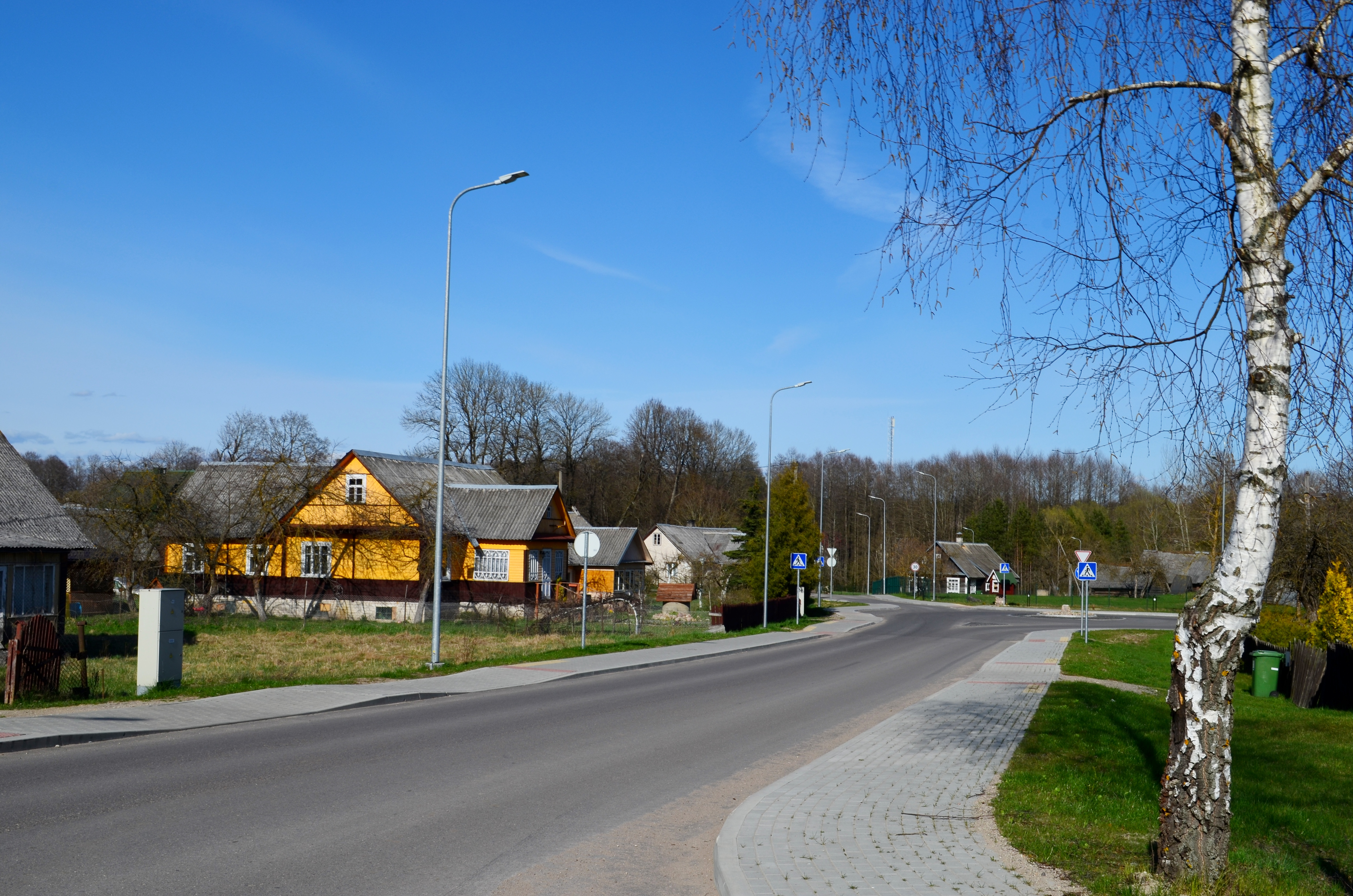
- Street in Matuizos

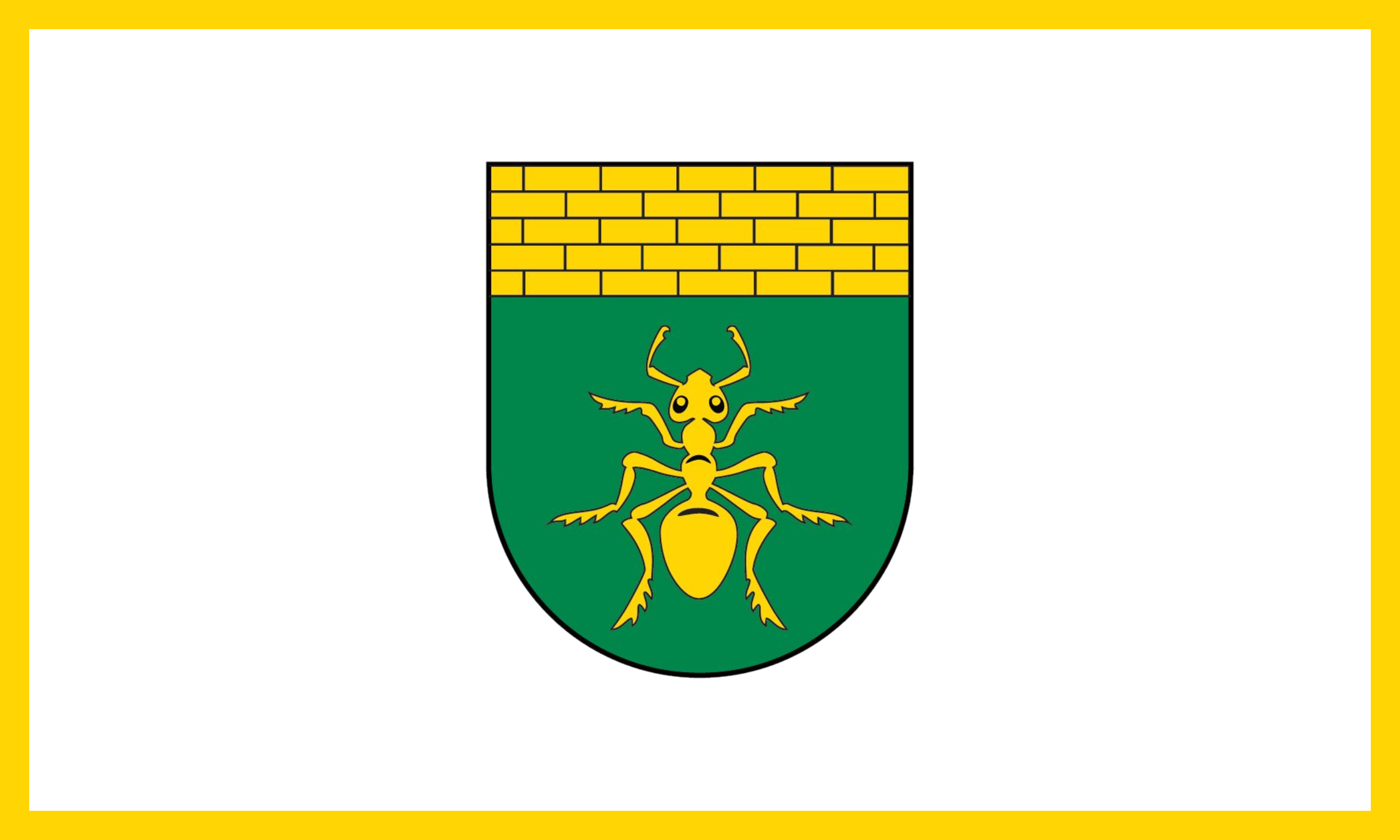
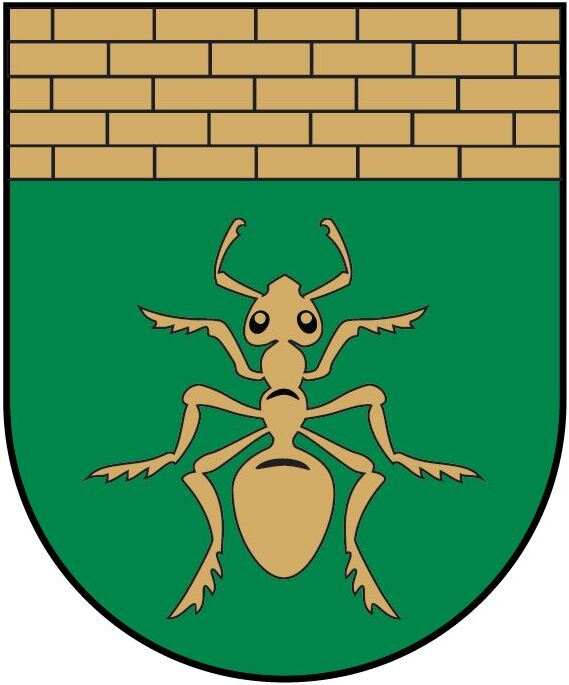
- Flag Seal

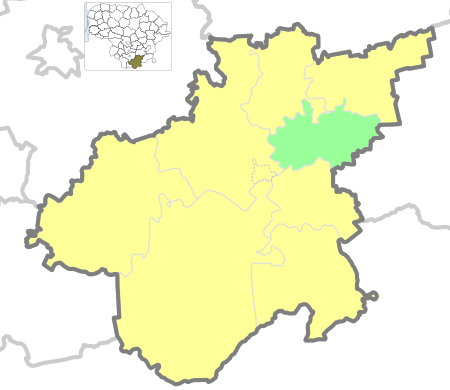
- Location of Matuizos Eldership
- Coordinates: 54.281°N 24.734°E
- Country: Lithuania
- Ethnographic region: Dzūkija
- County: Alytus County
- Municipality: Varėna District Municipality
- Administrative centre: Matuizos

Area
  - Total: 148 km^{2} (57 sq mi)

Population (2021)
  - Total: 1,833
  - Density: 12.4/km^{2} (32.1/sq mi)
- Time zone: UTC+2 (EET)
  - Summer (DST): UTC+3 (EEST)

Matuizos Eldership (Lithuanian: Matuizų seniūnija) is a Lithuanian eldership, located in the northern part of Varėna District Municipality.
