= Matuizos =

Coordinates: 54°17′N 24°41′E

- Village
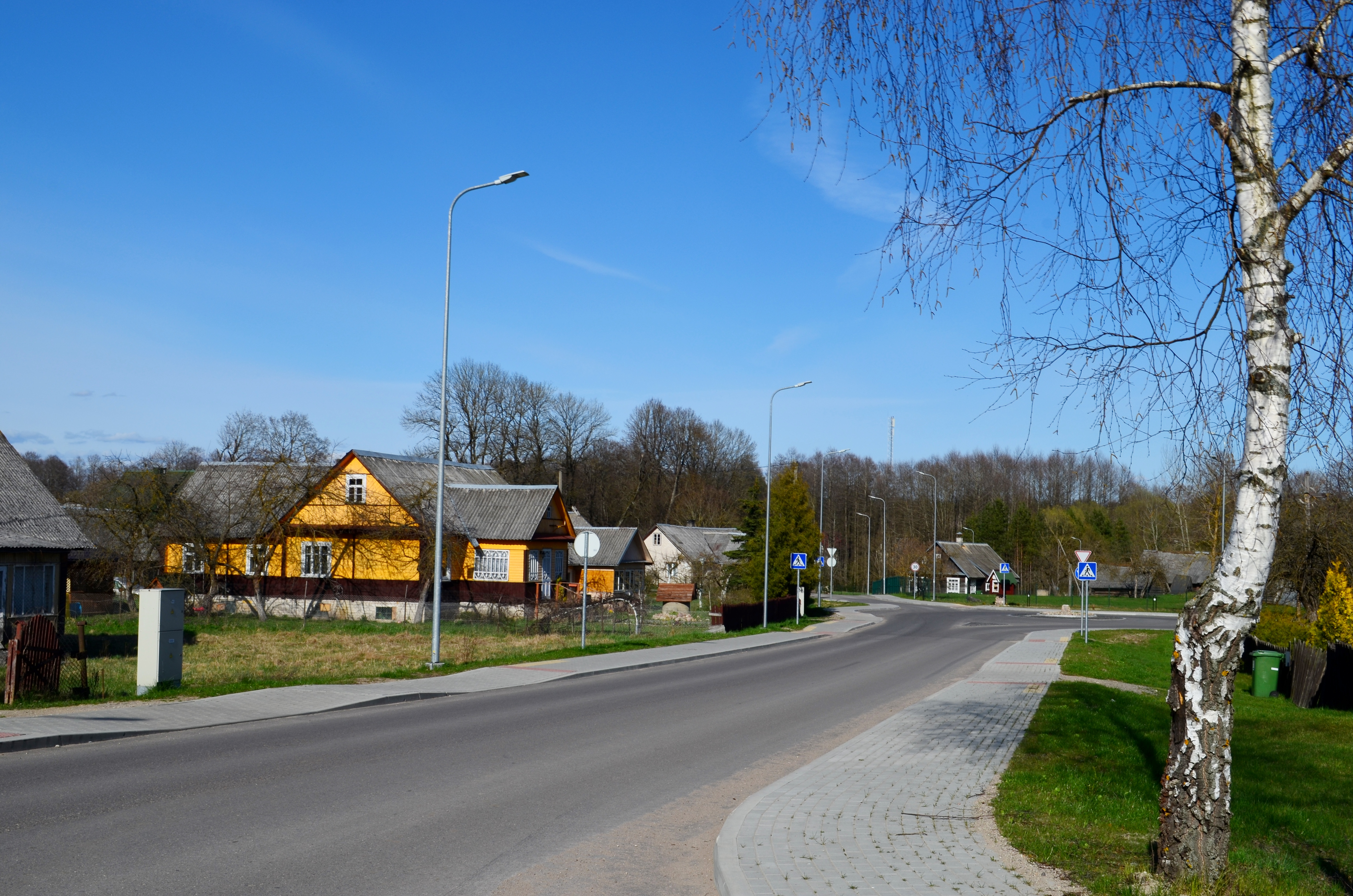
- Street in Matuizos

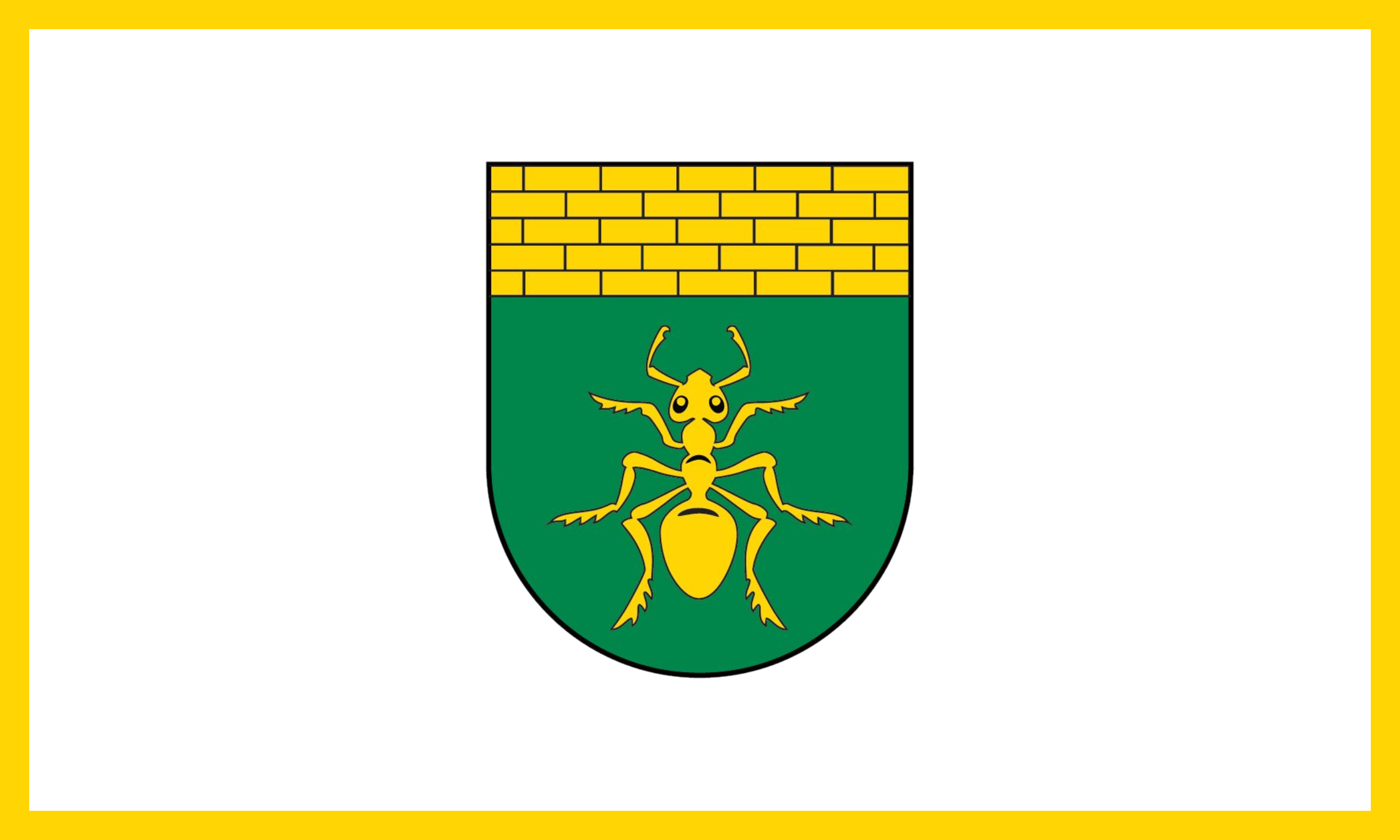
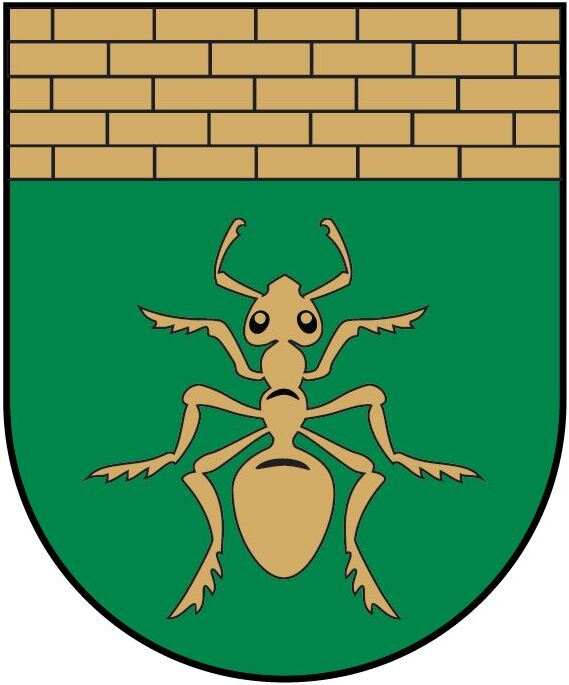
- Flag Seal
- Interactive map of Matuizos
- Country: Lithuania
- County: Alytus County
- Municipality: Varėna

Population (2021)
  - Total: 1,073
- Time zone: UTC+2 (EET)
  - Summer (DST): UTC+3 (EEST)

Matuizos is a village in Varėna district municipality, in Alytus County, in southeastern Lithuania. According to the 2011 census, the village has a population of 1201 people.

The village has a library, events hall, a medical station, Matuizos high school and museum of the school.

== History ==
The village was established in the beginning of the 19th century. Until the beginning of the Second World War it was named Baculioniai.

== Etymology ==
The name Matuizos comes from a personal name Matúiza, Matúizas which (probably through Belarusian: Матуйзo) is from a German personal name Mathäus. The earlier name Baculionys is from a personal name Baciùlis (also Bacỹs, Bãcius) which may be originated from Belarusian: бацька, баця 'a daddy'.
