= Antanas Mackevičius =

Lithuanian priest (1828–1863)

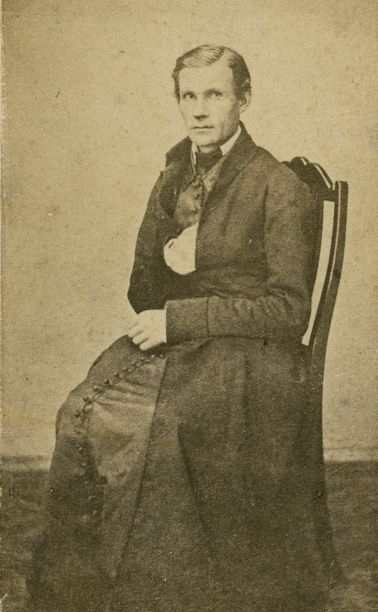
- A picture of Mackevičius
- Born: June 28, 1828; Morkiai village, Raseiniai County, Russian Empire
- Died: December 28, 1863 (aged 35); Kaunas, Governorate of Kaunas, Russian Empire
- Cause of death: Execution by Tsarist hangmen
- Education: Vilnius Gymnasium (1840–1846) Saint Vladimir University (1846–1849) Varniai Priest Seminary (1850–1853)
- Occupation: Roman Catholic priest

Antanas Mackevičius (Polish: Antoni Mackiewicz; 26 June 1828 – 28 December 1863) was a Lithuanian Roman Catholic priest who was one of the leaders and initiators of the January Uprising in Lithuania.^{[a]}

Mackevičius was born to a family of petty nobles. He studied in Kyiv and Varniai. He became involved in the uprising conspiracy. After the outbreak of the January Uprising in Warsaw on January 22, he announced the manifesto of the National Government on March 8 and formed a unit in Paberžė, which consisted mainly of the local Lithuanian peasants that enthusiastically joined his units. Mackevičius, dressed in the priest's Cassock coat himself, being bi-lingual, commanded his troops in the Lithuanian and Polish language. He joined Zygmunt Sierakowski's unit, after whose defeat he continued to fight on his own. He was one of the longest-fighting commanders of a partisan unit in Lithuania. On 17 December 1863, he was captured by the Russians and executed a few days later in Kaunas. He became a legend during his lifetime and is still considered a national hero in Lithuania and Poland.

== Early life and education ==
Mackevičius was born on 26 June 1828 in Morkiai village, near Tytuvėnai in Raseiniai County. At the time, this was in Lioliai parish. His parents were the petty nobles Tadas Mackevičius (Tadeusz Mackiewicz) and Marijona Mackevičienė. In 1840, at the age of 12, Mackevičius walked by foot to Vilnius in order to pursue education. He spent six years learning in the Vilnius Gymnasium. This gymnasium was located in the former Vilnius University, which was closed after the failed 1831 Uprising. It's not clear whether Mackevičius finished his secondary education. After that Mackevičius studied at the then-renowned Saint Vladimir University in Kyiv from 1846 to 1849. However, he did not finish studies, because he firmly resolved to becoming a priest. He did so because he thought that this would bring him closer to the common Lithuanian people. Thereafter, from 1850 to 1853, he was in the Varniai Priest Seminary.

== Catholic Ministry ==
He was ordained, and between 1853 and 1855 he served as the vicar in Krekenava. Then, between 1855 and 1863, served as a priest in the Paberžė church, which was a part of Surviliškis parish. Mackevičius had close relations with the local peasants and was liked by them. During his ministry in this parish he organised patriotic demonstrations. In 1861, he delivered an anti-government sermon in Lithuanian on the anniversary of the Union of Lublin. These had to end after the introduction of martial law in Lithuania in 1861. At that time Mackevičius became involved in secret circles and joined the Reds' party. He himself founded two in Surviliškis and Paberžė. The priest Vincentas Šliogeris conducted similar activities in the neighbouring Vilkija and Šventybrastis. The circles were subordinated to the movement's committee in Kaunas, and later in Vilnius. Everything was supervised by Zygmunt Sierakowski from Saint Petersburg. Bolesław Dłuski was closely collaborating with Mackevičius. In the summer of 1862, Father Mackevičius attended the wedding of Zygmunt Sierakowski and Apolonia Dalewska. Most of the later leaders of the Lithuanian conspiracy gathered at the ceremony. Couple of days before he was nominated a representative of the Lithuanian Provincial Committee (Komitet Prowincjonalny Litewski) of the Reds for Samogitia. This was the start of feverish preparations for the uprising. Father Mackevičius was gathering weapons, supported by Józef Mickiewicz, Bolesław Dłuski and peasant Adomas Bitė.

== 1863―1864 Uprising ==
=== Prelude ===
When the uprising finally started in Warsaw on 22 and 23 January, the preparation in Lithuania accelerated even more. Because of the lack of arms and money Lithuanian Provincial Committee decided to postpone the start of the uprising for a couple of weeks and to limit it to only Vilnius, Kaunas and Grodno governorates. The committee was soon transformed into the Administrative Department of the Provinces of Lithuania (Polish: Wydział Zarządzający Prowincjami Litwy), where the authorities were held by the Whites, headed by Jakub Gieysztor. The new insurrectionary government ordered to refrain from overt demonstrations until the end of April. Neither Antanas Mackevičius nor Bolesław Dłuski heeded the call to not join the uprising.

=== Spring ===
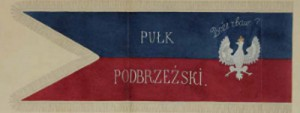
Documentary drawing depicting a banner of the Podbrzezie Regiment formed and led by Antoni Mackiewicz

Mackevičius ordered the priests of Liauda and Samogitia to read the National Government's manifesto and its decrees. He himself did it on 8 March 1863, when he read the manifesto during a sermon at the church in Paberžė (Polish: Podbrzezie) and Surviliškis. He called upon the people to rise up and restore independence, and promised to reorganize society by granting greater rights and land to peasants. Mackevičius succeeded in organizing some 250 men, armed with hunting rifles and straightened scythes, into the Paberžė Regiment, and soon the unit grew to 500 men. The unit was mainly made up of local peasants, but there were also representatives of the gentry, mainly the poor, urban youth and students. Germans, Prussian Lithuanians and volunteers from Mazovia also joined the unit. The officers were mainly fugitives from the Russian army, as well as cadets from the Polish military school in Cuneo. Unit was soon joined by Bolesław Kołyszko as a military instructor. His unit used a banner sewn from two parts: the top navy blue and the bottom crimson. It depicted on the main side the White Eagle wearing a crown and the inscription in Polish: PUŁK PODBRZEŹSKI (the Paberžė Regiment), and motto in Polish: BOŻE ZBAW POLSKĘ (God, Save Poland). On the other side was an oil painted image of the Virgin Mary and St. Elisabeth. The insurgents wore gray knee-length sukmanas girdled with a leather belt, and the officers wore czamaras. On their heads, they wore rogatywka-style hats trimmed with sheep fur (so called krakuska). The first rebel marches were akin to celebratory processions. Wherever Mackevičius and his soldiers entered, he was joyously received. Wherever he went, Mackevičius was greeted with crosses, flags, hymns, and with bread and salt. The priests organised celebrations, sang Te Deum in the churches and read the rebel's manifesto from their pulpits about freeing the fatherland and giving land to the peasants.

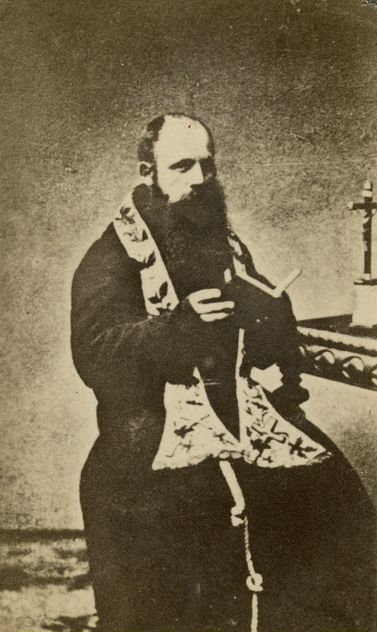
Antanas Mackevičius in priest robes, before 1863.

Later his unit merged with Bolesław Dłuski's party and on March 27 both units defeated a larger Russian unit near Miegėnai. On March 27, the units led by Mackevičius fought against four Russian infantry companies and one cavalry squadron near Naujaberžė. After the fight both divisions separated. Dłuski went towards the forests of Krakės, where he joined major Tomasz Kuszłejko's unit. Mackevičius together with 120 men went towards Kaunas. On April 19, he joined forces with the joint rebel army led by Zygmunt Sierakowski. Both soon clashed with Russians on 21 April during the victorious battle of Genėtiniai. Mackevičius' scythemen distinguished themselves in the battle of the Raguva forests on April 21. On April 26, Mackevičius fought in the battle of Karsakiškis, located in the forests of Karpis and Komaras, in the Panevėžys County. After this battle, several commanders active in the area joined forces under Sierakowski's command. According to Puzinas, Mackevičius was appointed commander of the 4th battalion, while according to Kozłowski, he was the 3rd battalion's commander. Soon, it was detached by Sierakowski for special tasks — destroying archives, taking over county coffers and others. On May 3, Mackevičius group was near Kamajai, while the next day, a part of his group was in Rokiškis. At the time, Sierakowski began marching towards Dünaburg in Courland and Mackevičius commanded the right-wing. Because of that, he took part only in the battle of Šniurkiškiai, i.e. the last part of the three-days long battle of Biržai, during which Sierakowski's brigade was defeated and destroyed. After the failed battle on May 8/9 near Gudiškiai, where Sierakowski was wounded and captured, Mackevičius' unit went from the Panevėžys County to the Raseiniai County.

After the battle, Mackevičius gathered about 400 men and moved towards Panevėžys. On his way, he met the unit of Ignacy Laskowski, who was appointed as commander by wounded Sierakowski. They joined forces and created a strong unit of about 1000 partisans, which was on 16 May strengthened by Mamert Giedgowd' soldiers, near Paberžė. Soon Giedgowd disengaged and Mackevičius's and Laskowski's detachment headed for Tauragė to capture weapons.

=== Summer ===
Throughout summer and autumn of 1863, Mackevičius fought many battles against the Russian Army, e.g. near Tytuvėnai, Šilalė, Rietavas, Tverai, Šiluva, Krakės, Josvainiai and others.

The detachment was constantly under attack, and on 2 June a major battle took place at Užventis. Reinforced by Jan Staniewicz's troop, the insurgents had the advantage and forced the Russians to retreat. The battle of Tytuvėnai on 6 June was similarly successful. Staniewicz then broke off, and Mackevičius and Laskowski marched further south. They successfully clashed with the Russian army at Žaiginys (19 June) and Konopajcice (22 June), but at Mantvydai (24 June) their unit was broken up.

Priest Mackevičius set off in the direction of Panevėžys, and on the way joined up with the Kończa party, but they soon separated. On 19 July, near Panevėžys, he tried to break up a Russian convoy - unsuccessfully, but he succeeded in a night attack on the Russian guard. There was also a successful skirmish near Bistrampolis Manor on the night of 31 July/1 August. The next major skirmish of Mackevičius's unit was the victorious battle of Kėdainiai on August 12. In the next battle, at Buda on August 20, the Russians had a six-fold advantage over the 120 partisans and, despite fierce defence, forced them to retreat. At the end of August, Konstanty Kalinowski, extraordinary commissioner of the National Government for Lithuania, appointed Mackevičius political commissar of the Kaunas voivodeship, and Ignacy Laskowski head of the Kaunas voivodeship.

=== Autumn ===
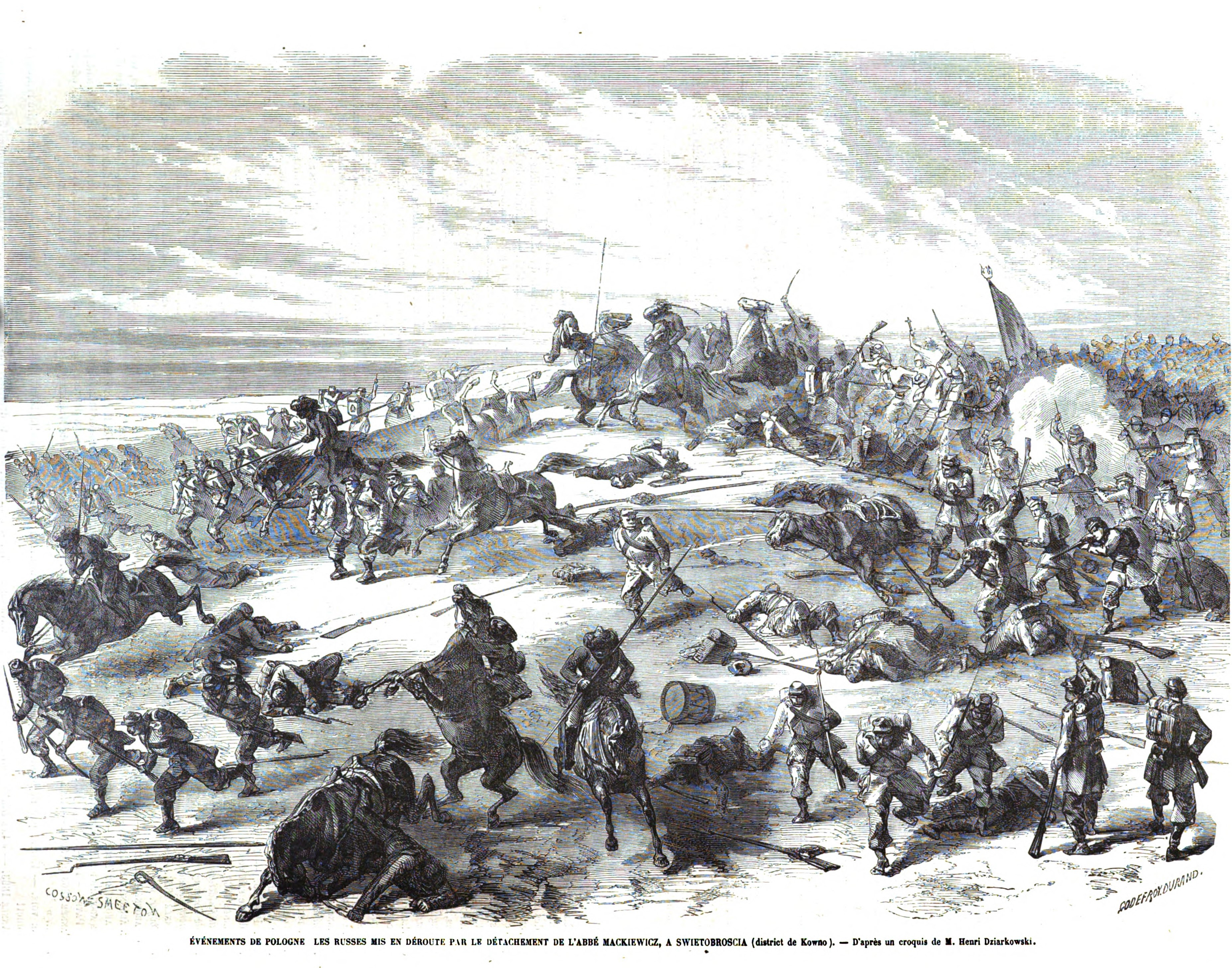
Events in Poland — pushing back the Russians by Father Mackevičius' attack near Šventybrastis near Kaunas, based on a sketch by Henryk Dziarkowski, drawing by Godefroy Durand, engraved by Collon Smeeton (L'Illustration, No. 1088, 2 January 1864).

This did not change much, Mackevičius continued his guerrilla fight in the forests of Panevėžys. The only major skirmish in this period was the successful battle of Krekenava on 9 September. On October 9 Mackevičius's unit attacked a Russian unit on the route of the march from Kėdainiai to Ramygala. He then joined forces with the troops of Paweł Staniewicz near Šventybrastis. However, the grouping was attacked and broken up by the Russians on 19 October. On November 3 Mackevičius succeeded in breaking up a Russian detachment near Kėdainiai and captured a considerable amount of ammunition. Nonetheless, the uprising in Samogitia was collapsing. The troops that were still active gathered in the forests near Gaižuvėlė; besides Mackevičius, these were the parties of Aleksander Domaszewicz, Jurewicz and Jagiełłowicz. A total of 272 partisans. Mackevičius' last battle was on November 26 at Lebedžiai near Vilkija. In this battle, the partisans were attacked and smashed by a 700-strong Russian detachment and the commander Aleksander Domaszewicz was captured.

After the battle, Antanas Mackevičius announced his departure and his intention to go to France to acquire firearms and start fighting again in the spring of 1864. According to other sources he was sent to Warsaw, in order to obtain information about the state of the uprising and to acquire weapons. Nonetheless, on December 17, he was captured near Ringuva, 5 kilometers from Vilkija, while preparing to cross the river Nemunas. He was captured together with Julian Rodowicz and his aide-de-camp Florjan D'Artuzi. Three of them were taken to the prison in Kaunas. After Mackevičius was captured, he was transported and shown throughout the country by the occupying Russian authorities to convince Lithuanians that further resistance was pointless. The Russians told Mackevičius that he would not be punished if he betrayed the other leaders of the uprising, but Mackevičius sternly refused. During interrogation and court proceedings, Mackevičius behaved admirably.

By the direct order of Mikhail Muravyov-Vilensky his interrogations were expedited and after only a week he was brought before the court which sentenced him to death. Mackevičius was hanged in public view on 28 December 1863. He was executed in Kaunas. An attempt to rescue him by a group from Aleksotas did not get beyond the planning stages and therefore was unable to prevent his execution.

== Political views ==
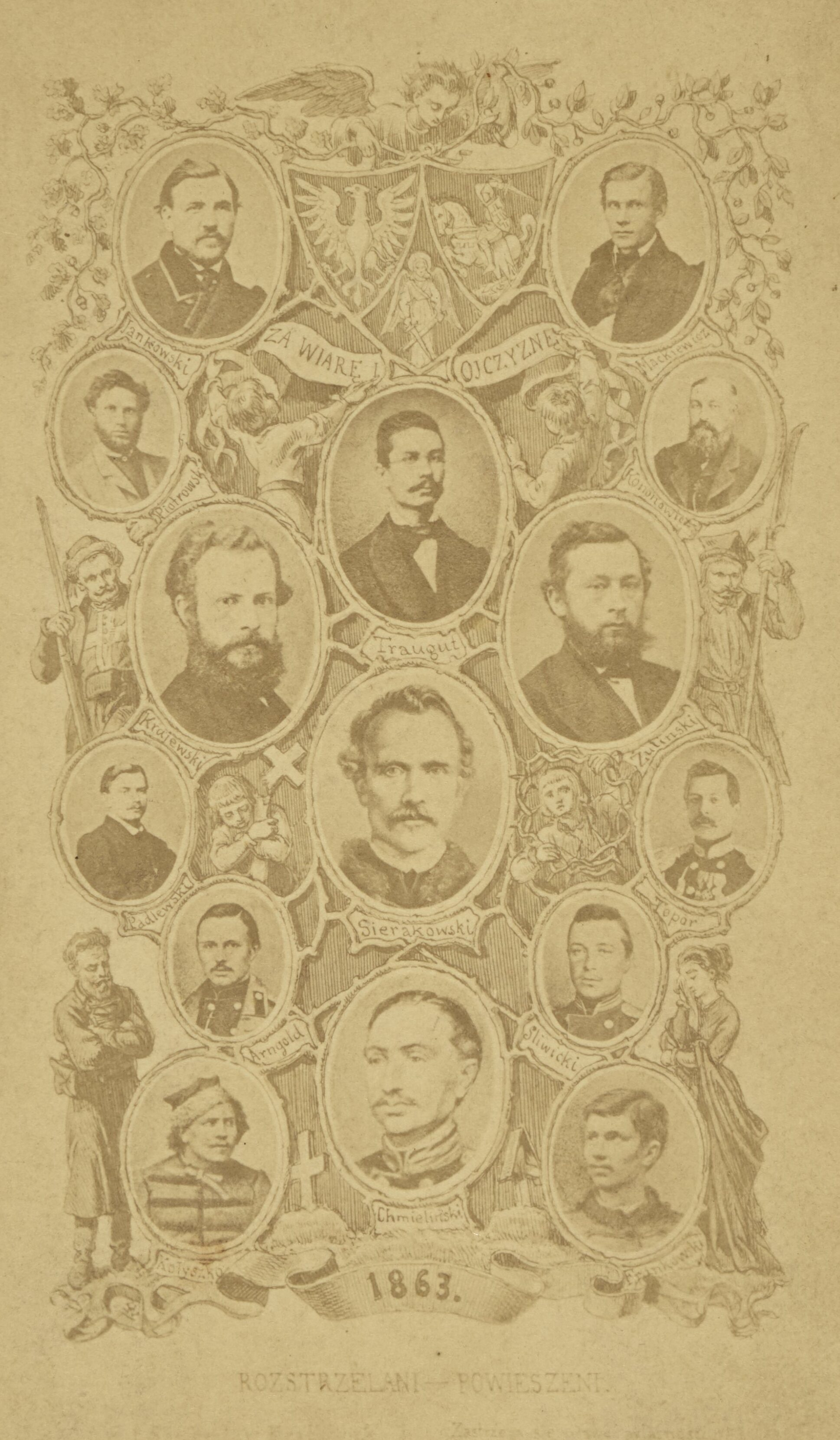
Mackevičius' photograph among the portraits of executed leaders of January Uprising. For the Faith and the Homeland 1863, executed - hanged by Awit Szubert.

Mackevičius is often regarded as the most prominent example of Lithuanian separatism during the uprising of 1863. According to Jurgis Želvys, following the unsuccessful 1831 Uprising, Mackevičius, like most of the Lithuanian nobility, did not lose hope of restoring Lithuania's independence. The main source for learning about his views are his testimonies before Russian investigators. As Darius Staliūnas points out this source is questionable ― the testimony given in the face of death, could have been distorted. However, Mackevičius's texts from previous years are missing, so no comparison is possible.

In his testimony, Mackevičius emphasised socio-economic factors as the reason for joining the uprising. He drew attention to the dire situation of the Lithuanian peasantry, whose situation only worsened after the abolition of serfdom. The people suffered under the oppression of the nobility and the tsarist administration. As the second reason for the revolt, he pointed to the suppression of the Catholic religion by the Russian authorities.

More controversial are his views about the connection between Poland and Lithuania. At one point, he stresses that Poland united with Lithuania voluntarily and therefore sympathies for Poland are deeply rooted in Lithuania. He goes on to say that the aim of the uprising was to force Russia to carry out reforms "or else cede Lithuania to Poland as one of its parts". Elsewhere, he emphasised social factors, saying that immediately after the uprising broke out in the Kingdom of Poland, he announced an uprising in Lithuania because Poland promised tax equality for all classes and the granting of land. And the people of Lithuania were more favourable to Poland than to imperial Russia.

On the other hand, he also says that the aim of the uprising was to give the Lithuanian people the opportunity to express themselves freely whether they would rather join Poland or Russia. He goes on to say that Lithuania was forced to fight together with Poland because it was too weak on its own. It's hard to determine what was his actual view about the nature of the connection between Poland and Lithuania. According to Darius Staliūnas, his statements could be a real testimony of deep separatism, but also a last attempt to improve the conditions of the Lithuanian people in the face of the defeat of the uprising ― a promise of loyalty in exchange for reforms. However, according to Timothy Snyder, although now seen as a "proto-Lithuanian nationalist", Mackevičius' goal was indeed to recreate the Grand Duchy - but "in a provisional association with Poland".

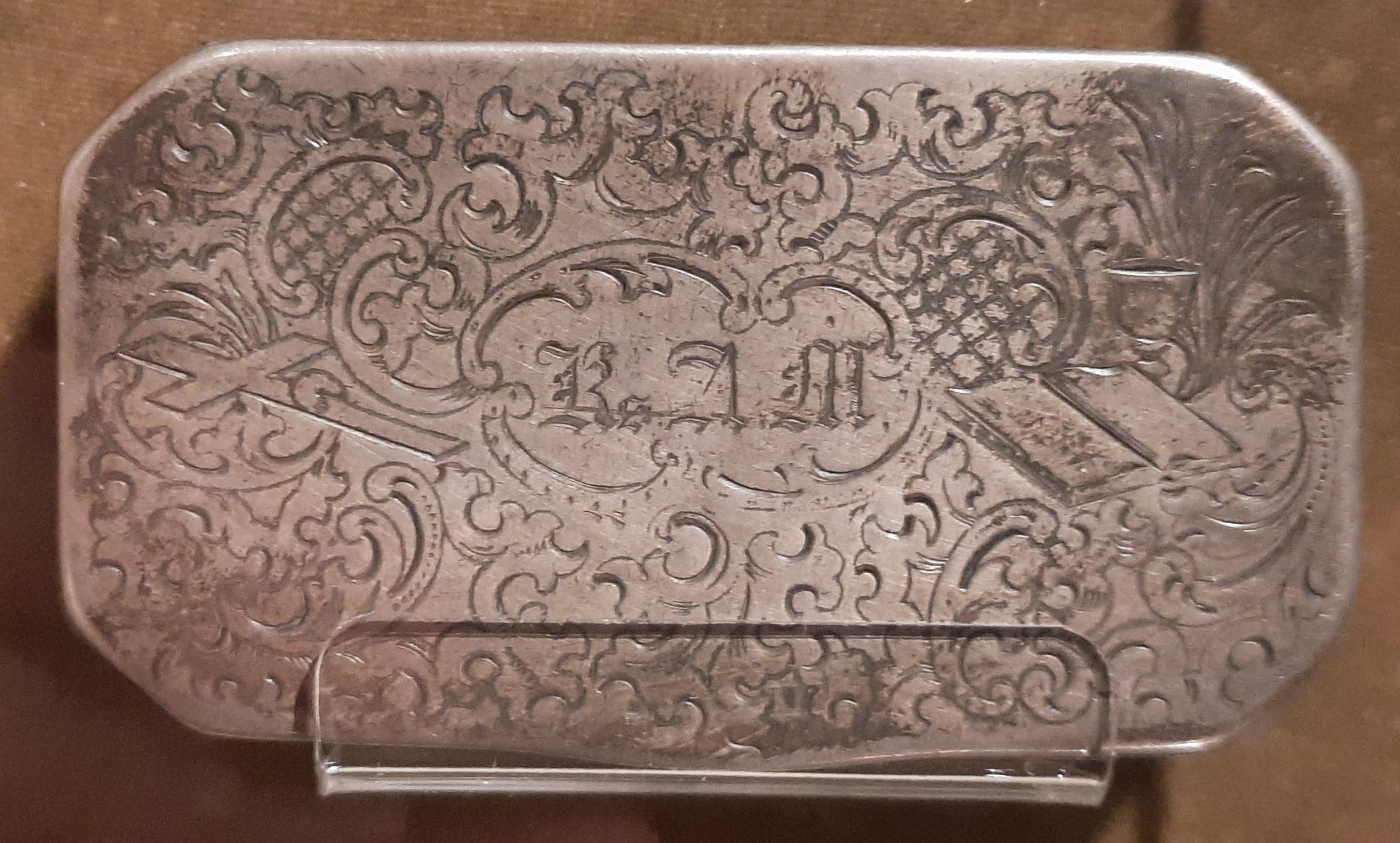
Snuff box belonging to the priest Mackevičius

Source of another type is a manuscript found in 2007 by a Lithuanian researcher Ieva Šenavičienė entitled: Ksiądz Mackiewicz jako postać dziejowa. Rys biograficzny (lit. 'Priest Mackiewicz as a historical figure. Biographical sketch'). It is an account of a member of Mackevičius' unit written down by Antoni Medeksza, the author of monographs on insurgent units fighting in Samogitia published in 1863-65 in the émigré periodical "Ojczyzna". The actual author of relation was identified by Šenavičienė as an officer named Rutkowski, a native of Kupiškis, who fought in Mackiewicz's unit and commanded infantry. He was one of the commander's most trusted officers. The text is divided into two parts, the first describing the time before the uprising was created between 1900 and 1904, and the second describing the actual fighting between 1864 and 1865. Šenavičienė claims that the account faithfully reflects the thoughts of Mackevičius himself, more than his testimonies written after his imprisonment, facing the death penalty. In the manuscript Mackevičius' main goal is the rebirth of the Polish-Lithuanian Commonwealth, which is explicitly referred to as "Poland" and its inhabitants, without distinction of ethnic origins, as "Poles". The author of the account criticises the nobility and the existing social relations, and sees the peasantry as the essence of the society. It calls for profound social reform, but this is to be possible only after independence and built in the spirit of the Christian Gospel.

We can also learn about Mackevičius view from the testimony of his contemporaries. Jakób Gieysztor claimed that Mackevičius had democratic views already during his studies in Kyiv. Already then, he advocated the abolition of serfdom.

== Commemoration ==
During his lifetime, Mackevičius became a legendary symbol of a steadfast partisan commander. The Lithuanian people did not believe in his death. In the spring of 1864, there was a rumour that Mackevičius had reappeared in the Kaunas area with his troop, in the regions where he had previously been active, the situation was still unstable. For Polish and Lithuanian historiographers he became a national hero. In Kėdainiai there is a commemorative exposition honouring Antanas Mackevičius' legacy at the town's museum. It contains many of Antanas Mackevičius' personal artifacts - his furniture, private letters, documents, and other items. In Paberžė, from where Mackevičius set out for the uprising, in the former Szylling manor house, there is a museum dedicated to the January Uprising.

== See also ==
- John Murphy

== Notes ==
a. The Uprising of 1863 in ethnographic Lithuania (part of which was in Congress Poland) officially began on February 1. This was later than the uprising in Poland, which began on January 22, from which came the uprising's name January Uprising. Due to the uprising in Lithuania beginning later than in Poland, the name "January Uprising" is inappropriate when talking about Lithuania. However, some contemporary Lithuanian historiography as well as Lithuanian translations of Polish works use the term "January Uprising" when referring to the uprising as a whole.

== Cited sources and other sources ==
- Fajnhauz, Dawid (1999). 1863. Litwa i Białoruś [1863: Lithuania and Belarus] (in Polish). Warsaw.
- Jurgėla, Kostas (1970). Lietuvos sukilimas 1862-1864 metais (in Lithuanian). Boston, Massachusetts: Lietuvių enciklopedijos leidykla.
- Kozłowski, Eligiusz (1974). "Antoni Mackiewicz". Polski Słownik Biograficzny (in Polish). Vol. 19. Wrocław. pp. 84–85.
- Łaniec, Stanisław (2001). Ksiądz Antoni Mackiewicz w latach manifestacji, konspiracji i powstania (1861-1863) [Father Antoni Mackiewicz during the demonstrations, conspiracy and uprising (1861-1863)] (in Polish). Olsztyn.
- Łaniec, Stanisław (2002a). Dowódcy i bohaterowie powstania styczniowego na Żmudzi [Commanders and heroes of the January Uprising in Samogitia] (in Polish). Toruń.
- Łaniec, Stanisław (2002b). Litwa i Biatorus w dobie konspiracji powstania zbrojnego (1861—1864) [Lithuania and Biatorus in the era of conspiracy and armed uprising (1861-1864)] (in Polish). Olsztyn.
- Mataitytė, Inga (2013). "1863 metų sukilimas ir sukilėliai kalboje". Gimtoji Kalba (in Lithuanian). 4: 4–11.
- MMNNL (30 October 2013). "Antanas Mackevičius - Lietuvos valstiečių vadas kovoje prieš carizmą" [Antanas Mackevičius - the leader of Lithuanian peasants in the fight against tsarism]. senas.lnb.lt (in Lithuanian).
- Puzinas, Jonas (1959). "Antanas Mackevičius". Lietuvių enciklopedija (in Lithuanian). Vol. 17. Boston. pp. 31–32.
- Šalčius, Juozas (1978). "Kunigo Antano Mackevičiaus 150-ąsias gimimo metines minint". Rūpintojėlis (in Lithuanian). 5.
- Šenavičienė, Ieva, ed. (2012). Kunigas Mackevičius kaip istorinė asmenybė. Biografijos kontūrai [Priest Mackiewicz as a historical figure. Biographical sketch] (in Lithuanian). Lietuvos istorijos institutas. ISBN 978-9955-847-60-1.
- Staliūnas, Darius (2016). "Litwini i powstanie 1863 roku" [Lithuanians and the Uprising of 1863]. In Adamski, Łukasz; Dębski, Sławomir (eds.). Wbrew królewskim aliansom. Rosja, Europa i polska walka o niepodległość w XIX wieku [Contrary to royal alliances. Russia, Europe and Polish struggle for independence in the 19th century] (in Polish). Warszawa. pp. 267–281.
- Vle.lt (2021). "Antanas Mackevičius". Vle.lt (in Lithuanian).
- Zubreckas, Alfonsas (16 August 2003). "Lietuvos katalikų dvasininkai ir 1863 metų sukilimas" [Lithuanian Catholic clergy and the 1863 uprising]. XXI amžius (in Lithuanian). 62.
- Želvys, Jurgis (2002). "Antanas Mackevičius ir Paberžė" [Antanas Mackevičius and Paberžė]. Žemaičių žemė (in Lithuanian). 3. Archived from the original on 4 December 2007.
