= Adomas Bitė =

Participant in the January Uprising (1836–1884)

- Born: 1836; Belzariškis, Raseiniai County
- Died: 9 1884 (aged approximately 48) Poitiers

Adomas Bitė (Polish: Adam Bitis; 1836–1884) was a participant of the January Uprising and a peasant.

== Biography ==
Bitė was born in 1836 in Belazariškiai (Białozoryszki), his father died two years later, leaving Adomas, his mother Barbara and his eight siblings, including one sister. Bitė first language was Samogitian dialect of Lithuanian, he wasn't able to speak Polish but knew and read in Lithuanian and had only a very basic knowledge of mathematics.

In March 1863, he joined the group of Tomas Kušleika. Together with Mamert Giedgowd, he was sent to Šiauliai County to assemble volunteers and weaponry. Later, Adomas Bitė belonged to Giedgowd's unit. On 28 April 1863, he fought in the battle near Krakės and Lenčiai (Krakės County). Then, on June 20, he fought near Žaiginys. After Giedgowd's capture on June 18, Bitė led his group. On August 15, the group fought near Mažuoliai. After half a month passed, there was a battle near Žąsaičiai on September 8 and near Budriai on September 11. Finally, there was the battle near Notiniškiai (Šiauliai County) on October 27.

At the end of 1863 or the start of 1864, Bitė left his group, passing the command to Wincenty Powilański, and himself leaving for France to find arms and foreign aid, but he did not return after the uprising was defeated. He lived in Paris. In Paris, he worked as a printer, lighting street lamps, among other things.

In 1871, he fought in the Paris Commune. He was given the rank of colonel by the Government of National Defense. He was active in the Veterans' Association. He learned to speak Polish and French. He lived on Sainte-Catherine-d'Enfer no 4.

On 29 December 1878, he married Lucille Le Prieur, daughter of Louis Jean and Louise Francoise Vivier. Died on 9 January 1884 in Poitiers.

== Sources ==
- Maksimaitienė, Ona (2003). "Adomas Bitė". Visuotinė lietuvių enciklopedija (in Lithuanian). Vol. III (Beketeriai-Chakasai). Vilnius: Mokslo ir enciklopedijų leidybos institutas. p. 249.
- Zieliński, Stanisław (1935). Obrazki z powstania 1863 r. (in Polish). Warsaw.
