= Mamert Giedgowd =

- Born: 1843
- Died: 1863 (aged 19–20)
- Wars and battles: January Uprising
- Noble family: Gedgaudai

Mamert Giedgowd (Lithuanian: Mamertas Gedgaudas; 1843–1863) was a noble from the Gedgaudai family and participant of the January Uprising.

== Service in the Imperial Russian Army ==
Until the Uprising, he was an officer in the Imperial Russian Army.

== 1863―1864 Uprising ==
In March 1863, he joined the rebel group led by Tomasz Kuszłejko. Together with Adomas Bitė, he was sent to Šiauliai County to assemble weapons and volunteers. Later, he became the commander of a group operatating mainly in the Šiauliai County. On 13 May 1863, his platoon of about 200 people fought in the Legečiai forest. After the lost battles, he joined the team of L. Leskauskis and Antanas Mackevičius in Krakiai forest (part of the Krakės-Dotnuva Forest). Captured on June 18, he was exiled to Siberia. Giedgowd escaped and returned to Kuszłejko's group. In autumn 1863, when Kuszłejko emigrated, he went into hiding. After being caught again, he was hung.

== Sources ==
- Maksimaitienė, Ona (2004). Mamertas Gedgaudas. Vol. VI (Fau-Goris). Vilnius: Mokslo ir enciklopedijų leidybos institutas.
- Maksimaitienė, Ona (2021). "Mamertas Gedgaudas".
