= God Save Poland =

God Save Poland may refer to:

- English translation of the title Boże, coś Polskę, Polish Catholic patriotic hymn
- "Boże Zbaw Polskę" ("God Save Poland" in Polish)
  - motto on the flag of the Paberžė Regiment
  - inscription on the rant of the 5 złotych polskich 1831 coin issued during the October Uprising
