= Miglutė Gerdaitytė =

Lithuanian physician

Miglutė Gerdaitytė (born 21 January 1940 in Šiauliai, Lithuania) is a physician and signatory of the 1990 Act of the Re-Establishment of the State of Lithuania.

== Early life and education ==
Gerdaitytė was born on 21 January 1940 in Šiauliai, Lithuania. She attended secondary school in the Meškuičiai region from 1946 to 1957.

Gerdaitytė received her degree in medicine from Vilnius State University in 1963.

== Career ==
Gerdaitytė returned to her home town Šiauliai, to serve as the chief physician of the Meškuičiai District Hospital, until 1990, when she was elected as Deputy of the Supreme Council – Reconstituent Seimas. In 1992, she returned to Šiauliai to continue serving as the chief physician until 2003.

== Politics ==
In 1990, Gerdaitytė transitioned into politics, being elected as a deputy to the Supreme Council – Reconstituent Seimas of Lithuania in the Šiauliai rural electoral district No. 91 in February. In March 1990, Gerdaitytė was a signatory of the Act of the Re-Establishment of the State of Lithuania. She was a member of the Sąjūdis faction and served as the deputy until 1992. During her tenure as deputy, she worked within the permanent Committee on Health Protection and Social Affairs. After returning to her work as a physician, Gerdaitytė stayed involved in politics, serving as a judge of the Supreme Court of Lithuania and as a deputy in both the Šiauliai district and Meškuičiai district councils.

== Honours and awards ==
In July 2000, Gerdaitytė was awarded the Medal of Independence of Lithuania. In January 2017, she was nominated for the honorary citizen of Šiauliai district, being nominated by the non-governmental organization "Meškuičių bendruomenė" and receiving a recommendation from the "Naisių bendruomenė" association.

== Personal life ==
Gerdaitytė is married and has a daughter and son.
