= Paberžė Regiment =

- Active: 8 March 1863 – autumn 1863
- Type: Infantry
- Engagements: Uprising of 1863

Commanders
- First and only commander: Antanas Mackevičius

The Paberžė Regiment (Lithuanian: Paberžės pulkas; Polish: Pułk Podbrzeski) was a Lithuanian infantry regiment commanded by Antanas Mackevičius during the Uprising of 1863. It was named after the village Paberžė (Polish: Podbrzezie). The regiment fought mostly in the Kaunas Governorate and ranged in strength from 700 to 1,170 members.

== Formation ==
On March 8, the priest Antanas Mackevičius read out the National Government's manifesto and its decrees during his sermon. After holy mass, about 300 people moved to the Krekenava forest, from whom the Paberžė regiment was formed. Their weaponry consisted of scythes and old guns. The uprising's leadership gave the name of Paberžė regiment to Mackevičius' party.

== Composition ==
The unit was mainly made up of local Lithuanian peasants, but there were also representatives of the gentry, mainly the poor, urban youth and students. Germans, Prussian Lithuanians and volunteers from Mazovia also joined the unit. The officers were mainly fugitives from the Imperial Russian Army, as well as cadets from the Polish military school in Cuneo. Unit was soon joined by Bolesław Kołyszko as a military instructor.

== Flag ==
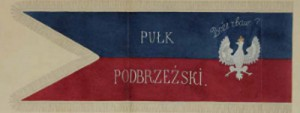
Documentary drawing depicting a banner of the Podbrzezie Regiment formed and led by Antanas Mackevičius

His unit used a banner sewn from two parts: the top navy blue and the bottom crimson. It depicted on the main side the White Eagle wearing a crown and the inscription in Polish: PUŁK PODBRZEŹSKI (the Paberžė Regiment), and motto in Polish: BOŻE ZBAW POLSKĘ (God, Save Poland). On the other side was an oil painted image of the Virgin Mary and St. Elisabeth. The regiment also had its own flag, which was entrusted to Juozas Damalakas, who was 16 years old in 1863 and was the regiment's youngest member.

== Uniform ==
The insurgents wore gray knee-length sukmanas girdled with a leather belt, and the officers wore czamaras. On their heads, they wore rogatywka-style hats trimmed with sheep fur (so called krakuska).

== Sources ==
- Budreckis, Algirdas (May 1967). "Pavyzdingas sukilėlis". Karys (in Lithuanian). 5 (1432).
- Kozłowski, Eligiusz (1974). "Antoni Mackiewicz". Polski Słownik Biograficzny (in Polish). Vol. 19. Wrocław. pp. 84–85.
- Łaniec, Stanisław (2002b). Litwa i Białorus w dobie konspiracji powstania zbrojnego (1861—1864) [Lithuania and Belarus in the era of conspiracy and armed uprising (1861-1864)] (in Polish). Olsztyn.
