= Tomasz Kuszłejko =

Tomasz Egidiusz Kuszłejko
- Born: 1821
- Died: 1894 (aged 72–73)
- Noble family: Kuszłejko family

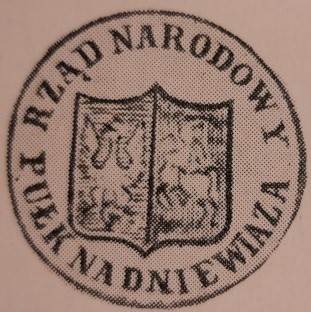
Seal used by the regiment of Tomasz Kuszłejko (1863)

Tomasz Egidiusz Kuszłejko (Lithuanian: Tomas Egidijus Kušleika; 1821 – 1894) was a participant of the Uprising of 1863.

== Early life ==
Kuszłejko came from the Lithuanian noble Kuszłejko family, he was born in Trankiniai in Samogitia. He was an officer of the Imperial Russian Army. He went into reserve and lived in the Bartkūniškiai manor near Kėdainiai. Tomasz Kuszłejko was the owner of the Bartkūniškis manor.

== Uprising of 1863 ==
In March 1863, he was mobilised by Bolesław Dłuski to form a unit in the Krakės forests, near his manor. His unit of about 800 rebels, mostly peasants, concentrated in the Krakiai forest near Kuszłejko's manor, chose him as commander. This unit was called the Nevėžis Regiment (Polish: pułk nadniewiażski). In addition to organising the unit, Kuszłejko enfranchised the peasants of his manor. The regiment fought between Krakės and Lenčiai close to Ažytėnai, then in Varnioniai near Daugėlaičiai, and finally near Rekečiai and near Viekšniai (9 June 1863). Kuszłejko recruited new rebels through the regiment's fighters, inciting the public against Russian occupation. Among the recruiters was Adomas Bitė, who was very trusted by the local peasants. The regiment was later divided into smaller independent groups.

== In emigration ==
In autumn 1863, he emigrated and lived in France. He took an active part in the political life of emigration. He was a member of the Union of Polish Emigrants, as head of the Montparnasse commune, and a member of the Lithuanian Delegation, set up to settle the so-called "Lithuanian sums". In 1867, he was one of the initiators of the split and the formation of the right-wing so-called "Ogół" Organisation.

== Last years ==
Probably after 1868 he returned from emigration and settled in Galicia, mostly Lviv, from 1868. For several years he was involved in a court dispute over part of his estate, which the Kaniewski brothers were trying to seize. He died from a heart attack in Zamarstyniv in 1894.

== Sources ==
- Dyniewicz, Władysław (1894). "Obituary". Gazeta Polska w Chicago (in Polish). Chicago.
- Fajnhauz, Dawid (1999). 1863: Litwa i Białoruś (in Polish). Neriton. p. 189. ISBN 9788386842599.
- Kozłowski, Eligiusz (1968). "Tomasz Egidiusz Kuszłejko". Polski Słownik Biograficzny (in Polish). Vol. 13. Wrocław. p. 310.
- Łaniec, Stanisław (2002). Dowódcy i bohaterowie powstania styczniowego na Żmudzi (in Polish). Toruń.
- Maksimaitienė, Ona (2007). "Tomas Egidijus Kušleika". Visuotinė lietuvių enciklopedija (in Lithuanian). Vol. XI (Kremacija-Lenzo taisyklė). Vilnius: Mokslo ir enciklopedijų leidybos institutas. p. 336.
- Sruogienė, V. (September 1963). "Sukilimo vadai" (PDF). Karys (in Lithuanian). 7 (1394): 200.
- Wyczańska, Krystyna (1957). Polacy w Komunie Paryskiej 1871 r. (in Polish). Wydawnictwo Ministerstwa Obrony Narodowej. p. 132.
- Žalpiene, Danute (2006). Žemaitijos dvarai - pasipriešinimo centrai prieš Rusijos imperija̜ XIX a: konferencijos pranešimai (in Lithuanian). Šiauliai: Saulės delta. p. 15. ISBN 978-9955-522-97-3.
