= Vincentas Šliogeris =

Lithuanian priest, poet and translator

Vincentas Šliogeris (Polish: Wincenty Szlagier; 5 October 1832 – 12 April 1913) – Lithuanian priest, poet and translator. He distributed prohibited Lithuanian press against the Lithuanian press ban.

== Biography ==
After finishing the Šiauliai Gymnasium, he continued studying in the Samogitian Priest Seminary. He was arrested by the Russian administration for his support of the January Uprising.

He was released from arrest through the mediation of the Bishop of Samogitia Motiejus Valančius, but had to spend three years in the Kretinga prison. He was the parish priest of these churches: Church of St. Bishop Stanislavas in Meškuičiai, Church of St. Apostle Andrew in Laukžemė, Church of the Holy Trinity in Laižuva. He spent his last year as altarist of the Church of Holy Virgin Mary's Immaculate Conception in Alsėdžiai.

At the age of 60, he became interested in creating literature. He created church hymns and translated the poetry of Adam Mickiewicz. Šliogeris also wrote humorous poems and fables. Only a small part of Šliogeris' creations have survived until today.

== Sources ==
- www.spaudos.lt (2004). "Lietuviškas žodis. Daraktorių ir knygnešių katalogo vardyno priedas" (in Lithuanian). Archived from the original on 2015-12-06.
- www.varniai-museum.lt (2016). "Šliogeris Vincentas 1833 - †1913 IV". Samogitian Diocese Museum. Archived from the original on 23 April 2020.
- www.plunge.rvb.lt (28 February 2013). "Žymūs Plungės krašto žmonės" (in Lithuanian). Archived from the original on 24 November 2021.
- Maciūnas, Vincas (2003). "Adomas Mickevičius Lietuvių Literatūroje". In Šlekys, Jonas (ed.). Rinktiniai raštai: senoji Lietuvos literatūra (PDF) (in Lithuanian). Vol. XIV. Vilnius: Lietuvių literatūros ir tautosakos institutas. pp. 220–243.
- Šenevičienė, Ieva (2005). Dvasininkija ir lietuvybė: Katalikų Bažnyčios atsinaujinimas Žemaičių vyskupijoje XIX a. 5-7-ajame dešimtmetyje (in Lithuanian). ISBN 9986780748.
