= Algirdas Mykolas Dobrovolskis =

Lithuanian Catholic priest (1918–2005)

Father Stanislovas OFMCap
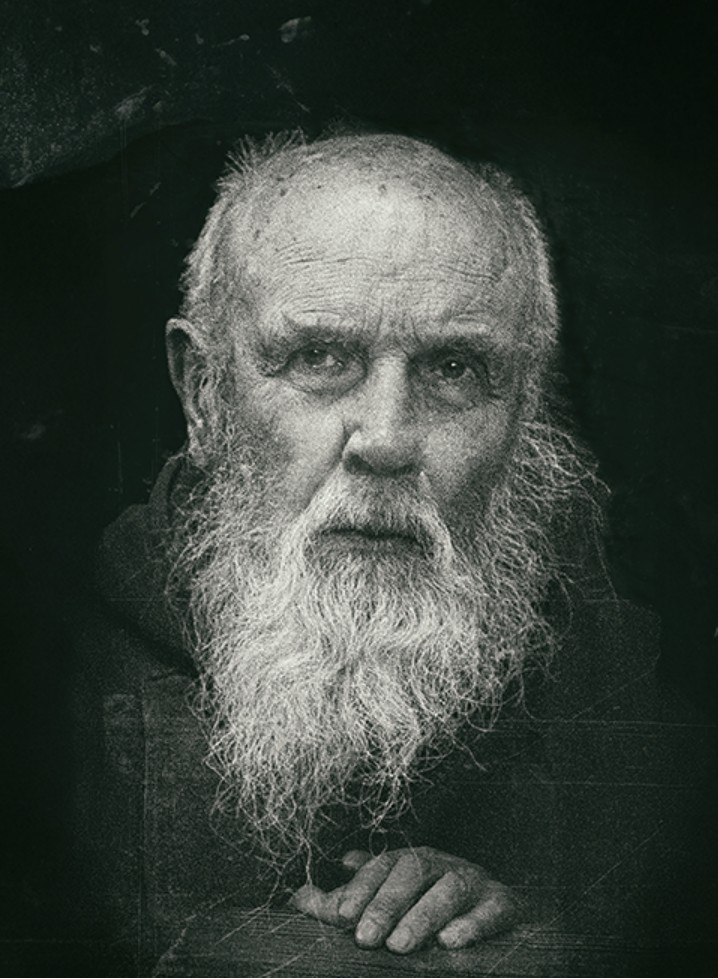
- Father Stanislovas in 2005

Personal life
- Born: Algirdas Mykolas Dobrovolskis; September 29, 1918 Radviliškis, Lithuania
- Died: June 23, 2005 (aged 86) Kaunas, Lithuania
- Resting place: Paberžė, Lithuania
- Education: Kaunas Seminary

Religious life
- Religion: Catholic Church
- Ordination: March 25, 1944

Algirdas Mykolas Dobrovolskis OFMCap (September 29, 1918 – June 23, 2005), better known as Father Stanislovas (Lithuanian: Tėvas Stanislovas), was a Lithuanian Catholic priest, preacher, and Capuchin friar. He became a prominent figure in the Lithuanian Catholic Church and public life during the second half of the 20th century. A political prisoner under the Soviet regime, he was known for his efforts to defend religious and civil rights and for his pastoral work with socially marginalized individuals. He was widely recognized for his role in promoting compassion, dialogue, and reconciliation within Lithuanian society.

== Birth and family background ==
Algirdas Mykolas Dobrovolskis was born on September 29, 1918, in Radviliškis, Lithuania, shortly after the country regained independence.

His father, Antanas Dobrovolskis (1870–1943), trained as a metalworker in his early youth and spent his entire working life as a railway employee. Eventually, just before World War II, he became the head of the Radviliškis railway depot. At that time, Radviliškis was a major railway junction in Lithuania.

After the death of his first wife, Malvina (née Steponavičiūtė; c. 1875 – after 1911), Antanas Dobrovolskis was left with three daughters. In 1911, he married his late wife's sister, Elena (1878–1920). In December 1912, their daughter Jadvyga (1912–2003) was born, followed later by another daughter who died during the wartime evacuation.

During World War I, Antanas Dobrovolskis fled with his family to the interior of Russia, where he worked as a locomotive driver. After the war, he returned to Lithuania. It was upon this return to Radviliškis that Algirdas Mykolas was born—the only son in the Dobrovolskis family.

The boy was baptized in Dotnuva Church. The parish priest did not allow the child to be baptized solely with the name Algirdas, so he was given a second name, Mykolas. Shortly afterward, his mother, Elena Dobrovolskienė, died in 1920 at the age of 42, a victim of one of the many epidemics that swept through Lithuania in the aftermath of the war.

His father married for a third time, bringing a stepmother, Stefanija (née Kryževičiūtė: 1885 –unknown), into the family. Algirdas Mykolas would later recall: "I never had a mother—she left me when I was a year and a half old. But I had the most wonderful stepmother one could imagine. My childhood was bright."

Algirdas Mykolas Dobrovolskis came from a family with noble roots—he noted that his mother Elena was a noblewoman, and the family was associated with the Polish-speaking gentry. Although they identified with Polish culture, he later reflected that they were in fact Polonized Lithuanians, drawn to the prestige of the Polish language.

== Education ==
Algirdas Mykolas Dobrovolskis attended primary school in Radviliškis. As Polish was spoken at home, he began school without knowing any Lithuanian. While his sister quickly adapted and became "Lithuanianized" through school, he initially struggled with the language.

Concerned about his son's education, his father transferred him in 1931 to the Jesuit Gymnasium in Kaunas. Later, he would recall: "Thanks to my father's patience and that of my teachers, I soon developed a love for learning—almost to the point of illness. My health even weakened... I became a fanatic for study."

After graduating in 1936, he entered the Capuchin Friars Minor monastery in Plungė. After four years of study, Dobrovolskis took his monastic vows and became Brother Stanislovas. Supported by the monastery leadership, he had planned to continue his studies in Paris.

"Four years passed, we completed our courses in philosophy and rhetoric. We were taking exams, and [Soviet] tanks were already rolling down the streets. We were still sitting in the classroom. My documents were ready for France—to continue theology studies and to study psychology. The visa was issued, everything was prepared. But the tanks came, and I stayed."

— Father Stanislovas, Pergalė, September 1990

However, after the Soviet occupation of Lithuania in the summer of 1940, those plans were abandoned. Instead, he was sent to study at the Kaunas Priest Seminary and was housed at the Capuchin monastery in Petrašiūnai, Kaunas.

== Rescue activities during World War II ==
During the Nazi occupation of Lithuania from 1941–1944, Dobrovolskis was deeply upset by the tragic fate of Lithuania's Jews. He took an active part in rescue efforts. He would receive forged documents from Father Bronislovas Paukštys of Kaunas' Holy Trinity Church and would then pass them on to Bronius Gotautas—an illiterate man who lived near the monastery and had devoted his life to saving Jews.

"During the war, I used to issue fictitious birth certificates for Jews. Near our monastery in Petrašiūnai lived a very saintly man. When the persecution of Jews began, I would obtain documents for him. This went on for several years. Eventually, the SS caught wind of it, came to me, and asked: 'Does so-and-so come here?' — 'He does,' I replied. Then they said: 'When he comes again, could you inform us?' — 'Unfortunately not,' I said in German, wondering what would happen next. But the German turned around and left. In those days, that was one step away from Auschwitz..."

— Father Stanislovas, quoted in Tiknevičiūtė 2012, p. 172.

With the forged documents, some of the rescued Jews were able to find employment at a peat bog near Petrašiūnai. Through Gotautas, the monks also delivered aid to Jews imprisoned in the Kaunas Ghetto.

== Priesthood and Soviet persecution (1944–1959) ==
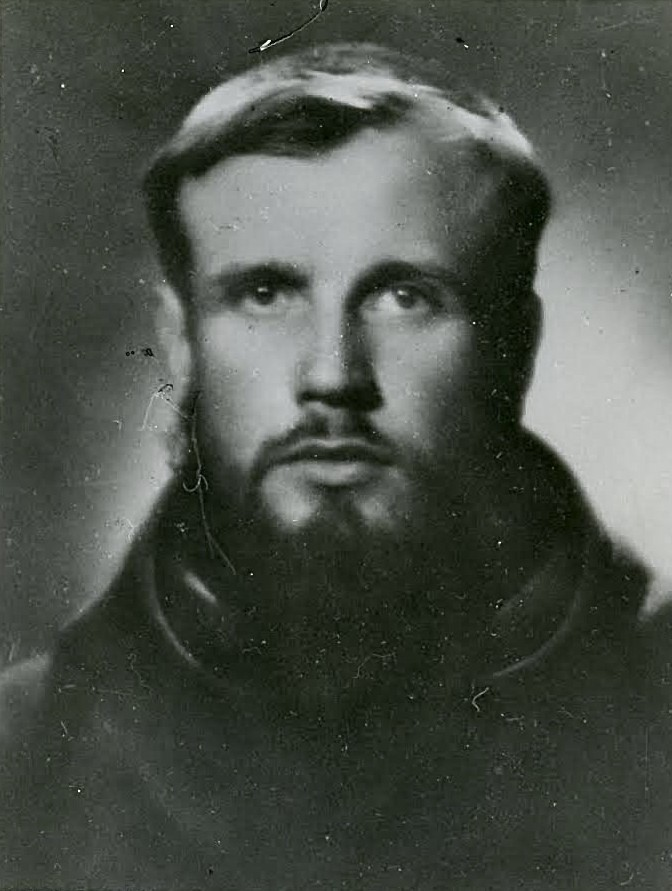
Father Stanislovas in 1944

After completing seminary studies, Brother Stanislovas was ordained on March 25, 1944, alongside Vincentas Sladkevičius (later Cardinal of Lithuania), and became Father Stanislovas. He was first assigned to the Capuchin monastery in Petrašiūnai and, in 1945, transferred to the monastery in Plungė. By then, Lithuania was once again under Soviet occupation, and religious activity was strictly monitored and limited by the authorities.

In 1948, he was sent back to Kaunas. Known for his powerful sermons, Father Stanislovas visited nearly a hundred parishes across Lithuania within five years. In his preaching, he encouraged resilience, expressed solidarity with those resisting Soviet rule, and called for prayers for those deported to Siberia and other remote regions of the Soviet Union as well those otherwise persecuted by Soviet authorities. He openly criticized deportations, advised against joining Soviet organizations, and urged couples to marry in church rather than through civil institutions.

His outspoken stance soon attracted official scrutiny. Public criticism of the Soviet regime brought him under the attention of both Church authorities and Soviet security services, who issued warnings about his activities. His home was searched in 1947, and again on August 10, 1948. He was arrested the following day. During interrogation, he acknowledged encouraging resistance to Soviet policies. In December 1948, he was sentenced to 10 years in a labor camp for "anti-Soviet propaganda" and sent to corrective labor camps in Inta (Minlag) and later Vorkuta (Vorkutlag) in the Komi ASSR.

According to eyewitness Kęstutis Jokubynas, in labor camp, Father Stanislovas volunteered for the most physically demanding work and was assigned to a brigade in mine construction. Each day, he walked several kilometers to the worksite in harsh conditions. Despite the exhaustion, he continued to pray, study Scripture, and when possible, to celebrate Mass—using a French Bible he had managed to keep hidden from the guards. In the evenings, while others rested, he began learning Spanish. His quiet discipline and resilience left a lasting impression on inmates and guards alike.

Released early in August 1956, he returned to Lithuania and was assigned to the remote parish of Vertimai [lt] in the Jurbarkas district. However, surveillance by Soviet authorities persisted. In March 1957, he was arrested again and returned to Vorkutlag to complete his sentence. After his release in August 1957, he was sent to Juodeikiai [lt]in the Joniškis District, where he lived in modest conditions and resumed his pastoral and intellectual work despite continuing restrictions.

Monsignor Kazimieras Vasiliauskas, who was imprisoned alongside Father Stanislovas in Inta, later offered this personal reflection:

"There were four thousand prisoners, including about eight hundred Lithuanians, among them around ten priests. Father Dobrovolskis was especially dear and close to all of us. For a time, we not only lived in the same barrack but also worked together in the same mine. Rarely did I meet people like him. He was extraordinarily hardworking and compassionate, always willing to share whatever resources he had. He knew how to get along with everyone. People of all backgrounds understood him... Everyone spoke of him with the greatest respect and sought his company."

— Monsignor K.Vasiliauskas's interview with Literatūra ir menas [Literature and Art], October 31, 1992

His years in the labor camps left a lasting imprint—deepening his empathy and strengthening his pastoral resolve. Upon returning, he resumed his ministry influenced by the hardships he had endured.

== Parishes and intellectual life (1960–1966) ==
In May 1960, Father Stanislovas was transferred to Žemaitkiemis in the Ukmergė District. Stripped by Soviet authorities of the right to perform priestly duties, he devoted himself to literary work—translating poetry, including that of Rainer Maria Rilke. He considered Rilke's poetry the pinnacle of theological and philosophical reflection, referring to it as a kind of breviary for the modern individual.

In August 1961, his priestly rights were restored, and he was appointed parish priest of Ugonys and Milašaičiai, in the Raseiniai District. He was later transferred to Butkiškės [lt], where he revitalized the church building and cemetery.

In every parish where he served, Father Stanislovas continued to write sermons and pursue studies in theology and philosophy. Although a 1964 KGB report noted that he no longer engaged in "organized anti-Soviet activities," his earlier record ensured that he remained under constant surveillance. His file was kept open by the KGB and later reclassified as a long-term monitoring case.

Years later, writer Vita Morkūnienė, author of a book on Father Stanislovas, described him as a deeply reflective and multilingual intellectual. He studied philosophers such as Martin Heidegger, Søren Kierkegaard, and Roland Barthes, and often quoted from memory authors like Franz Kafka, Marcel Proust, and Jean-Paul Sartre. He was especially drawn to Rilke's work, which profoundly shaped his worldview. A true polyglot, he considered Latin the most vivid of all languages, spoke fluent German, and had a strong command of French and Spanish. Altogether, he was able to converse in seven languages and read in more than a dozen.

== Life and work in Paberžė (1966–1990) ==
In 1966, Father Stanislovas was transferred to the remote and impoverished parish of Paberžė in the Kėdainiai District. Despite its isolation, he devoted himself to both pastoral and cultural work. He began by repairing the wooden church and restoring the cemetery. New cemetery gates were installed, featuring traditional Lithuanian metal crosses adorned with sun motifs, the moon, and plant symbols. Continuing local woodcarving traditions, he also erected roofed wooden poles (stogastulpiai) on the graves of participants in the 1863 uprising against czarist rule in Lithuania. One of these elements—the metal sun (saulutė[lt]), became a distinctive symbol of Paberžė. Over the years, Father Stanislovas crafted and distributed an estimated 30,000 saulutės, offering them as gifts and souvenirs to visitors.

Influenced by Rilke's writings, Father Stanislovas began collecting old household items, which he restored together with visitors who sought refuge from hardship, addiction, or personal crises. He also preserved and repaired liturgical vestments, prayer books, and processional lanterns. Before long, the remote village of Paberžė became a pilgrimage destination not only for Lithuanian intellectuals and cultural figures but also for visitors from across the Soviet Union.

As Monsignor Kazimieras Vasiliauskas noted, "At that time, Paberžė had already become Lithuania's Mecca and Medina — a place of pilgrimage for both sinners and intellectuals alike." Father Stanislovas's home was widely known as a welcoming place for individuals facing personal or social challenges.

During these years, Father Stanislovas continued his opposition to the Soviet regime's restrictions on religious and cultural life. He preserved and distributed prohibited publications such as The Chronicle of the Catholic Church in Lithuania, Aušra (The Dawn), and Dievas ir Tėvynė (God and Homeland), along with interwar Lithuanian publications and works by authors such as Boris Pasternak and Aleksandr Solzhenitsyn. He also translated works by Western philosophers and theologians, which circulated via underground self-publishing networks.

The KGB regarded his activities as subversive. In 1972, a new file on him was opened under the codename The Collector. His home was searched multiple times, and thousands of pages of writings, notes, and translations were confiscated. In 1976, KGB reports acknowledged the difficulty of prosecuting him due to lack of formal evidence, though covert surveillance, wiretapping, and informant recruitment continued.

Among those who visited Father Stanislovas in Paberžė were Russian writer and dissident Aleksandr Solzhenitsyn, Russian Orthodox theologian Father Alexander Men, and other cultural and religious figures closely monitored by Soviet authorities.

== Continued KGB surveillance and dissent (1976–1990) ==
In 1976, Father Stanislovas received a formal warning from the KGB for "ideologically harmful" actions. Despite mounting pressure, he continued his activities. That same year, covert listening devices were installed in his home. In 1978, the KGB opened a joint operational case entitled Accomplices targeting Father Stanislovas and his associates. He was summoned for questioning, threatened with public discreditation, and urged to collaborate with the security services—proposals he rejected.

According to KGB operational plans from 1979, Father Stanislovas was considered an ideological figure for what the authorities classified as "hostile activity" because he maintained contact with Russian dissidents, religious leaders, and other individuals under surveillance, and was alleged to regularly distribute illegal anti-Soviet publications.

Although a 1981 KGB report claimed that Father Stanislovas had largely ceased distributing prohibited literature, subsequent documents contradicted this. Surveillance continued: at least three KGB agents monitored his activities, observed his sermons, and recorded his contacts.

Despite constant surveillance, Father Stanislovas continued to voice his convictions. In 1978, he joined other clergy in signing a public statement opposing the new Constitution of the Lithuanian SSR, which curtailed religious freedoms. In 1983, he co-signed a petition calling for the release of imprisoned priests Alfonsas Svarinskas and Sigitas Tamkevičius. He also maintained moral and spiritual support for members of the Lithuanian Helsinki Group and other dissidents.

== Post-Independence (1990–2005) ==
After Lithuania regained its independence, in 1990 Cardinal Vincentas Sladkevičius entrusted Father Stanislovas with overseeing the restoration of the former Bernardine monastery in Dotnuva (Kėdainiai District). At the time, Father Stanislovas was already 72 years old. Over the next twelve years, despite Lithuania's difficult post-Soviet economic conditions, he successfully led the restoration of the ruined monastery and the adjacent church.

From the beginning of his pastoral career in the mid-1940s, Father Stanislovas was widely recognized for his sermons. Between 1992 and 1994, his homilies were published in the daily newspaper Tiesa (later renamed Diena), which had formerly been the official publication of the Lithuanian Communist Party during Soviet rule.

In 1994, a collection titled Father Stanislovas's Sermons was released, followed in 1997 by an expanded edition On Love and Service. These sermons appeared during a period of significant social tension in Lithuania. His message, rooted in the Gospel spirit, emphasized compassion and understanding, and sought to foster reconciliation within a society facing political and economic transition.

Through his words and example, he advocated for the grytelnikai—rural inhabitants who had lost their livelihoods during the dissolution of collective farms and redistribution of formerly collectivized property.

In 1999, Father Stanislovas was awarded the Santarvė Foundation Award in recognition of his contributions to fostering tolerance, compassion, and reconciliation in Lithuanian society.

"The three of us — Cardinal Sladkevičius, Monsignor Vasiliauskas, and, I'm not ashamed to say, myself — were deeply concerned about the hatred that had persisted in Lithuania for twelve years. I call this phenomenon a 'witch hunt.' We made countless statements — the Cardinal, the Monsignor, and I — all intended to help bring that atmosphere of hostility to an end."

— Father Stanislovas's interview with Lithuanian Radio in 2003, Tiknevičiūtė 2012, p. 250.

In 2002, Father Stanislovas returned to Paberžė, where he resumed pastoral duties despite declining health. He remained active, performing baptisms, marriages, funerals and offering counsel to those in need. As in earlier years, Paberžė remained a place of refuge for individuals facing personal hardships, people recovering from addiction, children with disabilities, and many visitors and pilgrims.

Father Stanislovas died on June 23, 2005, and was buried in the churchyard of Paberžė Church [lt].

== Criticism and polemics in public life ==
Father Stanislovas was widely revered for his pastoral dedication and moral authority, yet his public engagement during Lithuania's post-Soviet transition drew criticism from some clergy and politicians.

Philosopher Arvydas Juozaitis, one of the founders of Sąjūdis, observed:

During those transitional years, the majority of the clergy aligned themselves with right-wing political forces. A visible political alliance emerged between right-wing politicians and the Church—evident in the press and other media—which sought to "revoke the right" to serve Lithuania from ideologically reformed politicians. This stance quickly gained ground: anyone who did not support the authoritarianism promoted by the right was increasingly branded as ideologically or morally suspect. In some cases, even violence was used.

Father Stanislovas became perhaps the most prominent Lithuanian clergyman to refuse participation in what he called the "holy crusade against communists." While he had suffered under the Soviet regime, he differentiated in his approach between opposition to the system from the individuals who had been part of it. He chose to see people—not ideologies—and grounded his approach with the Gospel.

He consistently advocated reconciliation over retribution, urging forgiveness and healing. Citing the Lord's Prayer and the parable of the Prodigal Son, he called for unity—a stance that led some clergy and laypeople to question his political loyalties.

His support for the Farmers' Union (Lietuvos žemdirbių sąjunga) and the Lithuanian Future Forum (Lietuvos ateities forumas [lt]), both considered more left-leaning, deepened this divide. He also took a critical position on the Roman Catholic Church's efforts to reclaim previously nationalized property.

At one point, some parishioners were reportedly urged during Mass by more conservative leaning priests not to read the Saturday edition of Tiesa, which published his sermons, and some of his writings were removed from a religious bookstore in Kaunas.

In September 1993, coinciding with his 75th birthday, 153 Lithuanian priests issued a public letter condemning Father Stanislovas. The letter was in part a response to an interview he had given to Lietuvos rytas, published shortly before Pope John Paul II's historic visit to Lithuania. Father Stanislovas's interview had quickly drawn criticism from Vytautas Landsbergis, then chairman of the Homeland Union (Lithuanian Conservatives). He wrote:

Even one well-known and formerly influential clergyman greeted the Holy Father's visit on that very September 4 with fresh, bitter attacks against the 'right-wing'—several of whom, according to him, are crippled by fanatical hatred, wounded, and without a trace of love... Was it really necessary, on such an occasion, to once again divide, provoke, and attack?

Landsbergis's remarks reflected broader tensions between Church leadership and more left leaning political factions at the time. The priests' public letter followed on September 29, concluding:

There are many who love Lithuania. But... how many people in Lithuania today love the leftist government? We urge Father Stanislovas Dobrovolskis to weigh his words more carefully and not so lightly compromise himself or the Church.

Although many of the priests later privately apologized to Father Stanislovas, the incident exposed a deep rift within the Lithuanian clergy. Both his defenders and Father Stanislovas himself described his views as morally grounded rather than politically ideological.

Some, like Česlovas Kavaliauskas [lt]—a prominent Catholic priest, theologian, Bible translator, and former political prisoner, remarked in 1994 that accusations against Father Stanislovas revealed a deeper illness in society. He recalled Stanislovas's fearless criticism of Soviet repression during the Stalinist era and his unwavering support for Lithuanian identity from the pulpit. "That's why he ended up in the labor camps," he noted. Kavaliauskas dismissed claims that Father Stanislovas sympathized with leftist populism, emphasizing instead the Capuchin vow of poverty: "How could a Capuchin not support the poor? That is his position." He concluded by criticizing many amongst the clergy who attacked Stanislovas, as having been silent during the Soviet era, as opposed to Stanislovas who had been vocal in his criticisms of the Soviet system.

Some of his other actions also intersected with political matters. In 2002 his signature on a petition supporting a referendum on Lithuania's NATO accession also sparked criticism from Church authorities, who argued that clergy should not intervene in matters of national security. Father Stanislovas defended his action as a personal moral decision, shaped by memories of ideological manipulation under totalitarism.

Likewise, in 2003, he offered a blessing and brief remarks at the founding congress of the Labor Party, led by a controversial entrepreneur and politician Viktor Uspaskich. In his remarks, Father Stanislovas urged the party to prioritize public welfare. The following year, a party-sponsored newspaper ad featured his earlier praise for a local candidate, prompting renewed criticism. Archbishop Sigitas Tamkevičius accused him of disobedience and political partiality but imposed no disciplinary action.

Years later, historian Arūnas Streikus cited a Soviet KGB document alleging that Father Stanislovas had been coerced into collaboration in 1980. The claim—based on wiretaps and unverified reports—was widely challenged. In 2024, Lithuania's official vetting commission declared it had found no evidence of collaboration. Prominent intellectuals, including Krescencijus Stoškus [lt] and Arvydas Juozaitis, spoke out in his defense and condemned efforts to tarnish his legacy.

== Recognition and legacy ==
During his lifetime, Father Stanislovas received wide recognition for his contributions to Lithuanian society, pastoral care, and humanitarian efforts, including:

- The Officer's Cross of the Order of the Lithuanian Grand Duke Gediminas (1996) – awarded by presidential decree for his service to the nation.
- Honorary Citizen of the Kėdainiai Region (1997).
- The Life Saving Cross (1999) – awarded for his efforts to rescue Jews during the Holocaust.
- The Santarvė Foundation Award (1999) – in recognition of his work promoting tolerance, compassion, and reconciliation in Lithuanian society.

In 2009, Father Stanislovas's name was inscribed on the Tree of Unity [lt], a monument by sculptor Tadas Gutauskas, recognizing him as one of Lithuania's 100 most prominent personalities whose lives had a lasting impact on national history and culture.

To mark the centenary of his birth, the Lithuanian Parliament declared 2018 as Father Stanislovas Year (Lithuanian: Tėvo Stanislovo metai). His life and work continue to be honored through conferences, exhibitions, books, and documentaries that explore his enduring influence on Lithuanian spiritual, social, and cultural life.

That same year, the Lithuanian Special Archives launched a virtual exhibition dedicated to Father Stanislovas's life and legacy, which continues to this day. This exhibition includes original KGB surveillance documents, handwritten sermons, diary excerpts, criminal case files, and interrogation records. Also featured are internal reports from Soviet institutions assessing his activities as subversive. The exhibition offers a rare look at how the Soviet regime viewed and monitored his work.

== Quotes ==
"Father Stanislovas fought the Soviet regime through creation. Just imagine what would have happened to Lithuania's intellectuals if there had been no Father Stanislovas's Paberžė! He played an immensely important role: he showed educated people a very beautiful face of religion. Through him, God spoke beautifully…" — Monsignor Kazimieras Vasiliauskas

"Tolerance is an active state. It is not indifference. For me, the true apostle of tolerance and the greatest authority is Father Stanislovas, whom I would call the apostle of tolerance in Lithuania..." — Philosopher Arvydas Juozaitis

"There probably has never been, nor will there be, another priest like him. His incredible erudition, deep knowledge of the Holy Scriptures, and dedicated pastoral service marked his entire life. We priests — generation after generation — learned from him..." — Prelate, Monsignor Vincas Algirdas Pranckietis [lt]

The poet Justinas Marcinkevičius called Father Stanislovas "walking love." "He took only as much land as he needed, and took nothing from anyone. In him, I saw a man — a teacher in the truest sense of the word. That is why all of Lithuania was drawn to him."
