= Belazariškiai =

- Village
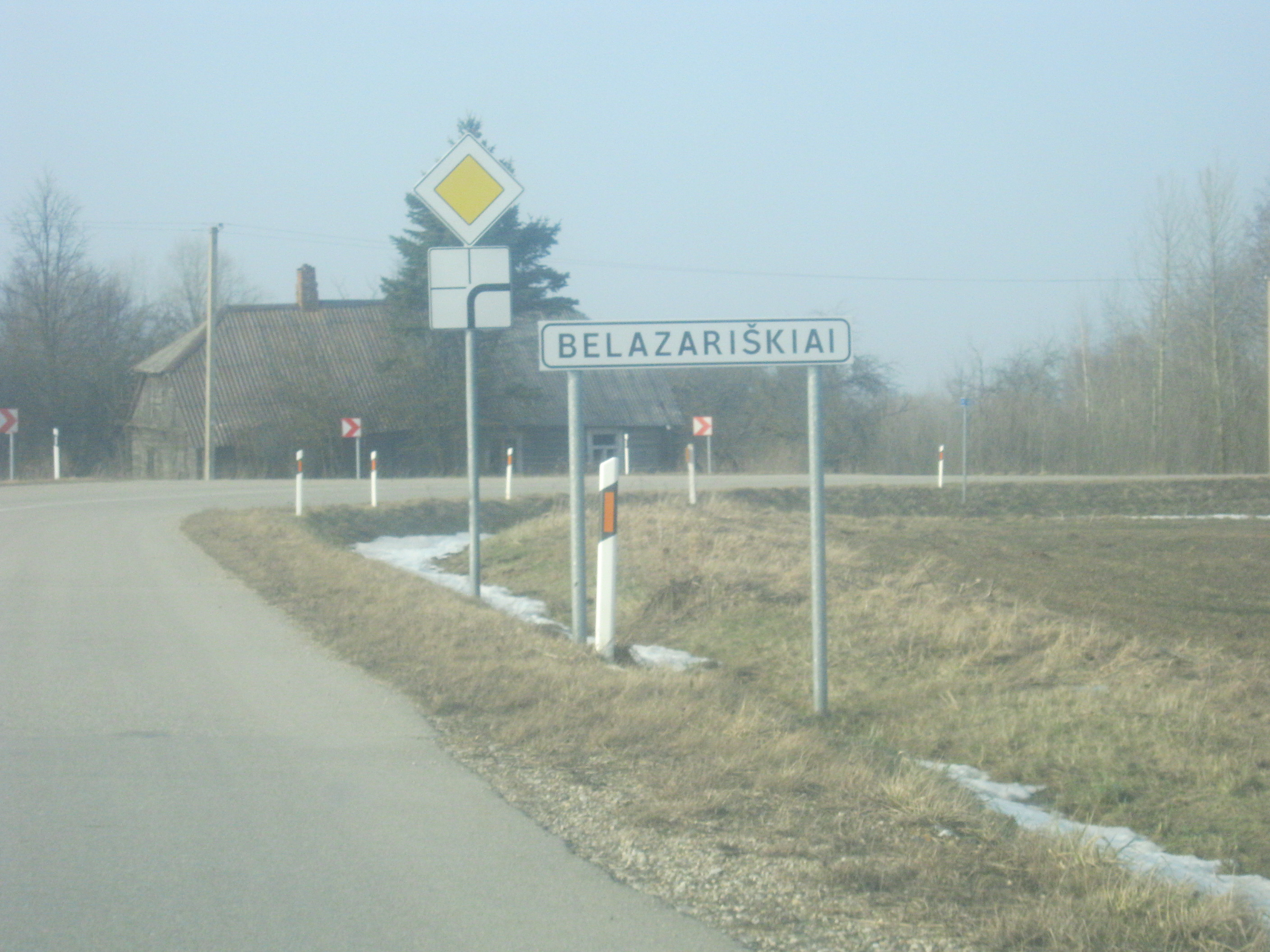
- Belazariškiai sign

- Location of Belazariškiai
- Coordinates: 55°15′43″N 24°28′33″E
- Country: Lithuania
- Ethnographic region: Aukštaitija
- County: Vilnius County
- Municipality: Ukmergė district municipality
- Eldership: Siesikai eldership

Population (2011)
  - Total: 50
- Time zone: UTC+2 (EET)
  - Summer (DST): UTC+3 (EEST)

Belazariškiai is a village in the Ukmergė district municipality, Lithuania, on the River Neris. According to the 2011 census, its population was 50.

Belazariškiai used to belong to the landed estate of the Polish noble family of Tekla Przecławska.
