= Žemaičių žemė =

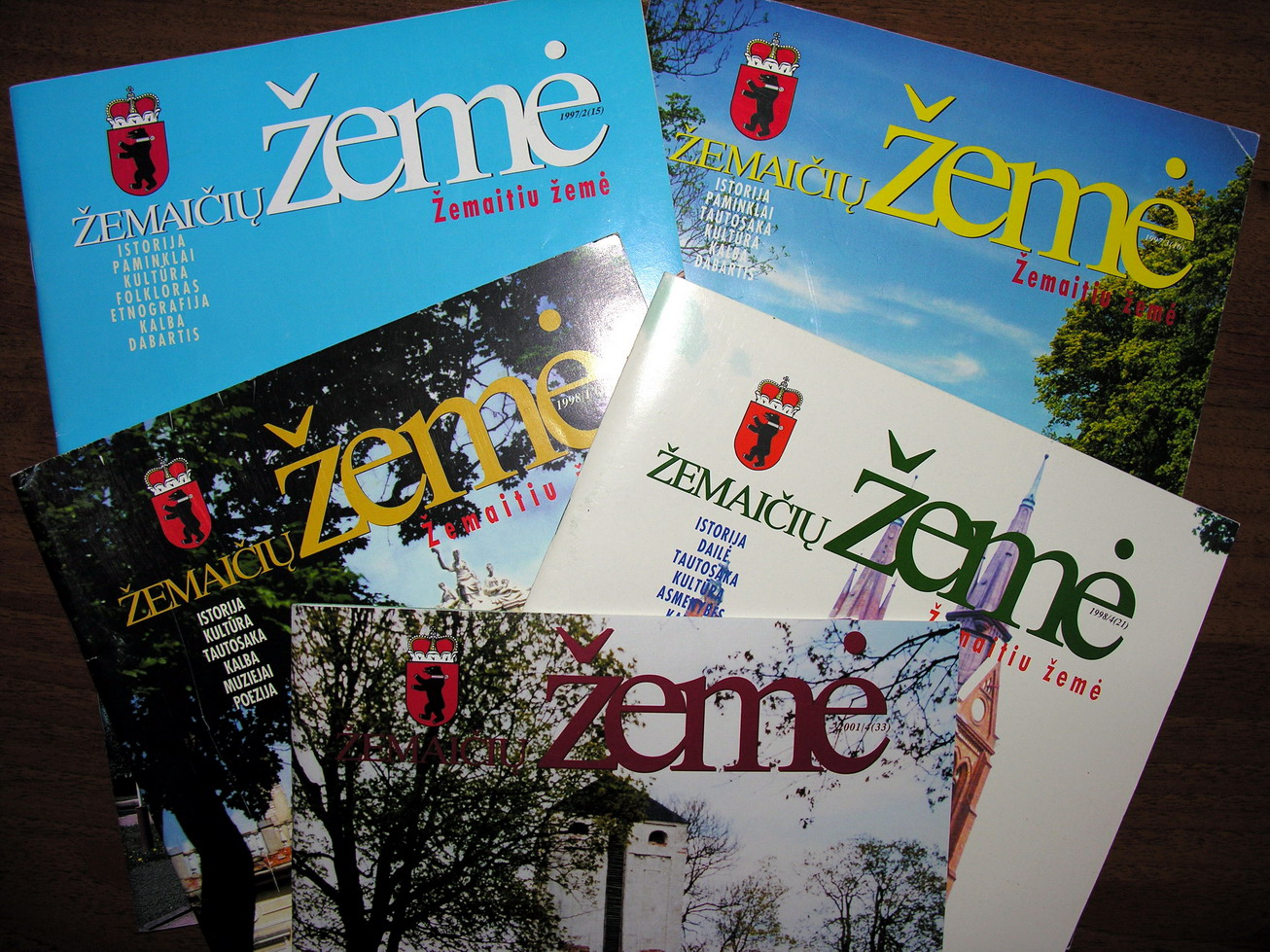
- Examples of Žemaičių žemė
- Editor-in-chief: Danutė Mukienė
- Founded: 1993
- Ceased publication: 2016
- Language: Lithuanian and Samogitian
- Country: Lithuania
- Circulation: 3,000 (1993); 1,800 (1997); 1,000 (2014–2016)
- ISSN: 1392-2610

Žemaičių žemė (Samogitian: Žemaitiu žemė; transl. Samogitian Land) was a quarterly magazine published by the Samogitian Cultural Society, Samogitian Academy, and Academic Samogitian Youth Corporation "Samogitia". It was published from 1993 to 2016. Most articles were written in the Lithuanian language, but some were in the Samogitian dialect. In 2011, the magazine was only available online. It focused on regional (Samogitian) culture and history.

== History ==
The first issue was released under the name Žemaitija. Its predecessor was the newspaper A mon sakā?, published from 1990 to 1993.

== Circulation ==
In 1993, circulation was 3,000, but it fell to 1,800 by 1997. The circulation in 2014–2016 was 1,000.

== Organization ==
The editor-in-chief was Danutė Mukienė. The magazine's editorial board consisted of Adomas Butrimas, Viktorija Daujotytė, Aleksas Girdenis, Zita Kelmickaitė and others.
