= Paberžė, Kėdainiai =

Paberžė
- Village
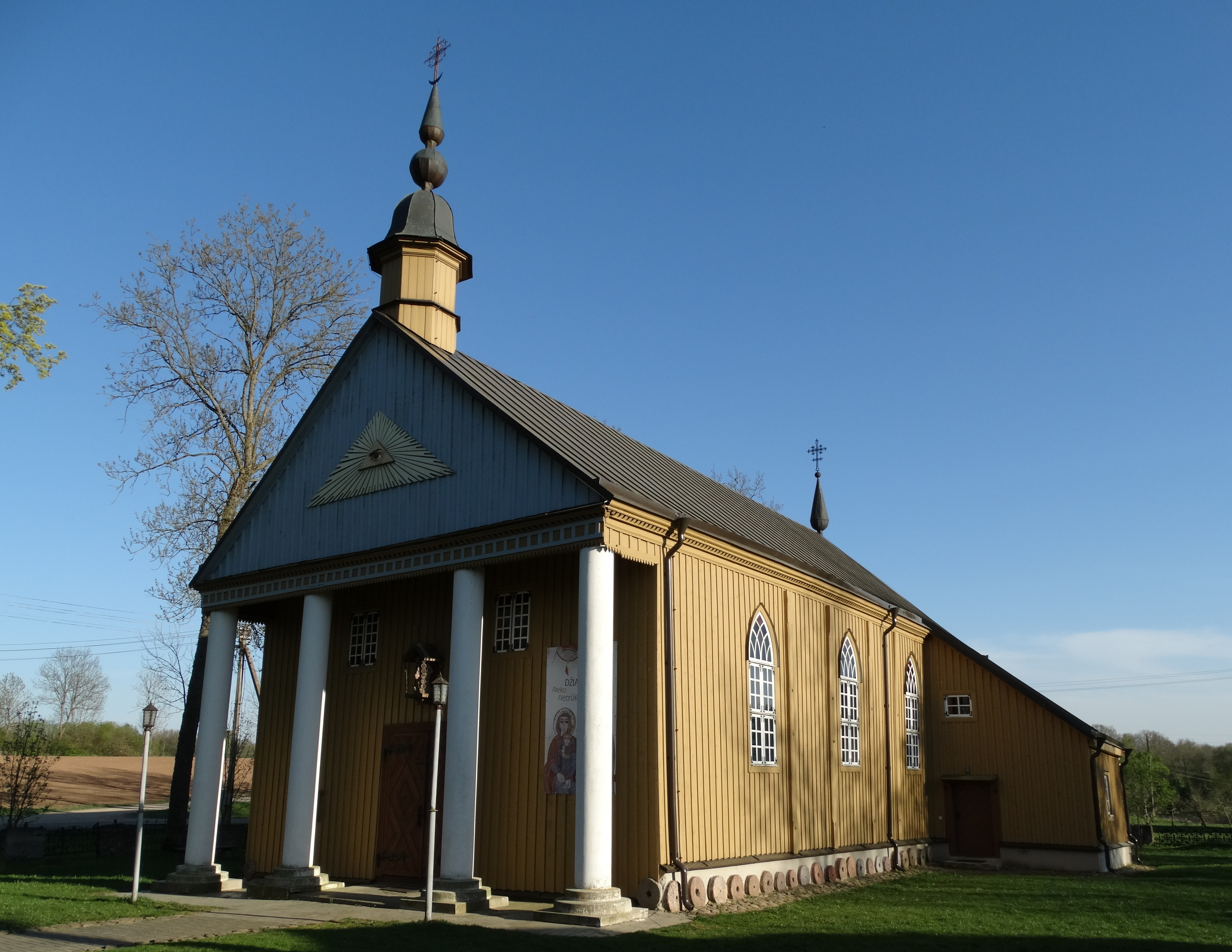

- Location in Lithuania
- Coordinates: 55°30′22″N 23°58′01″E
- Country: Lithuania
- County: Kaunas County
- Municipality: Kėdainiai district municipality
- Eldership: Gudžiūnai Eldership

Population (2011)
  - Total: 18
- Time zone: UTC+2 (EET)
  - Summer (DST): UTC+3 (EEST)

Paberžė ('a place by the birch forest', formerly Russian: Поберже, Polish: Podbrzezie) is a village in Kėdainiai district municipality, in Kaunas County, in central Lithuania. According to the 2011 census, the village had a population of 18 people. It is located by the confluence of the Liaudė and Nykis rivers, 32 km from Kėdainiai. Surroundings of Paberžė are declared as Paberžė landscape sanctuary.

There are wooden Catholic church of St. Mary, former Paberžė manor (now the Museum of Uprising), rebels' burial ground.

== History ==
In the 18th century Paberžė belonged to nobleman Schilling. He have build a wooden church and manor in the village. After the January Uprising Paberžė was transferred to Russian officer Tikheev.

== Demography ==
Historical population

Year	Pop.	±% p.a.
1902	85	—
1923	129	+2.01%
1959	89	−1.03%
1970	54	−4.44%

Year	Pop.	±% p.a.
1979	76	+3.87%
1989	40	−6.22%
2001	20	−5.61%
2011	18	−1.05%

Source: 1902, 1923, 1959 & 1970, 1979, 1989, 2001, 2011

== Notable people ==
- Antanas Mackevičius, priest who served in the Paberžė church and was one of the main local organizers of the January Uprising.
- Algirdas Mykolas Dobrovolskis, known as father Stanislovas, priest who served in the Paberžė church at the end of the 20th century. He was a prominent religious figure during late Soviet era.
- Liucija Sereikaitė-Juozonienė, physicist.

== Images ==
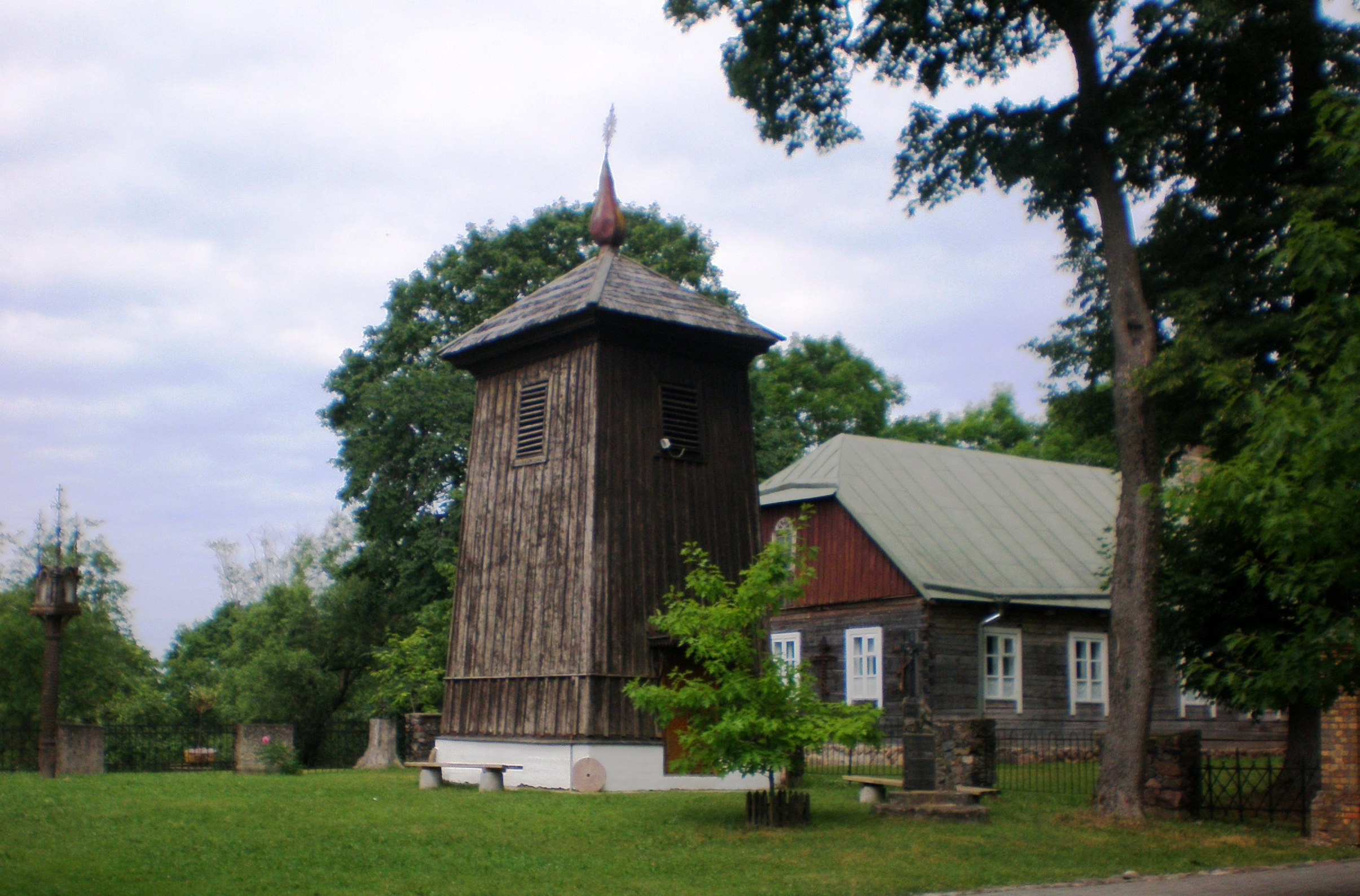
Paberžė church belltower

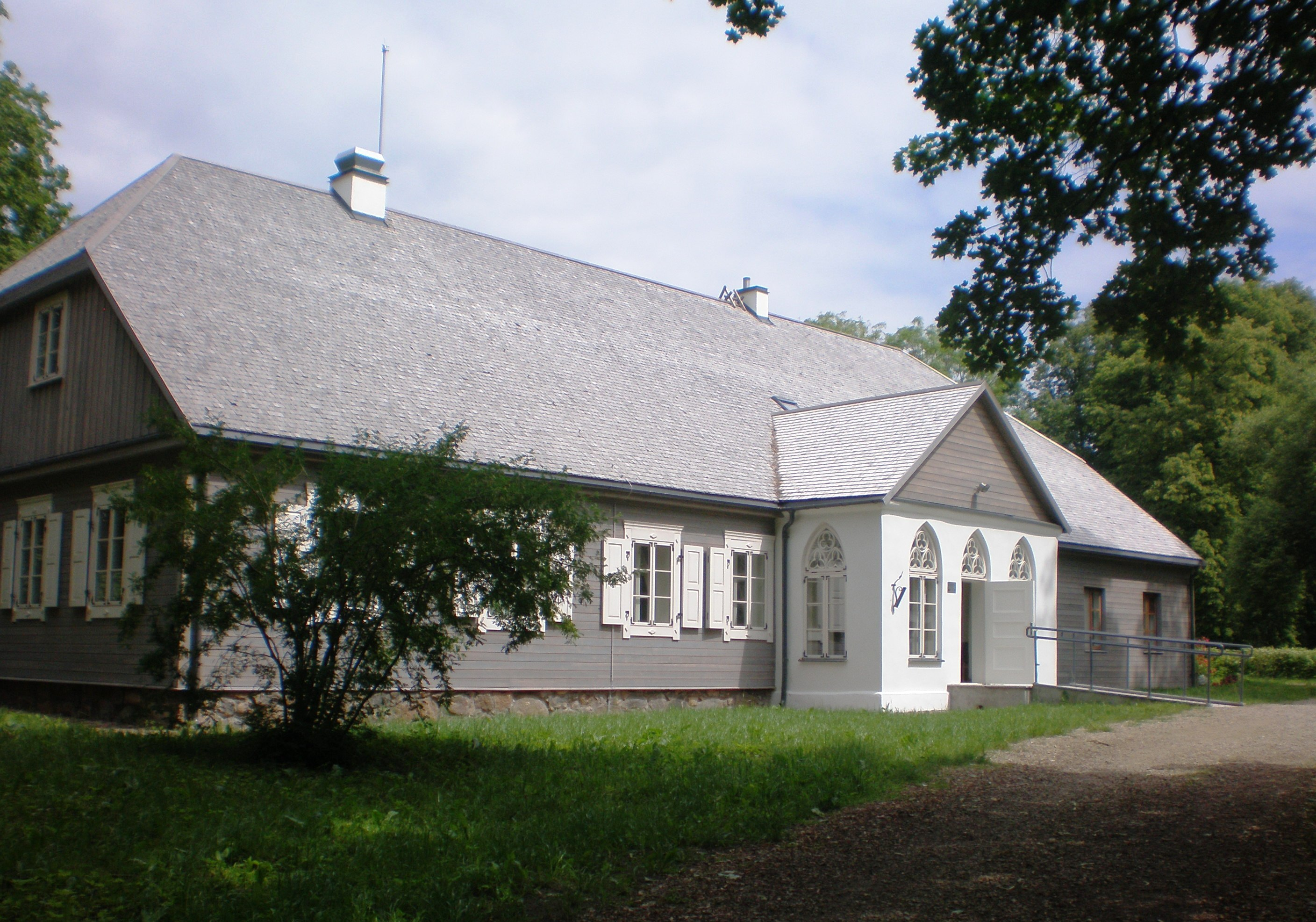
Museum (former manor)

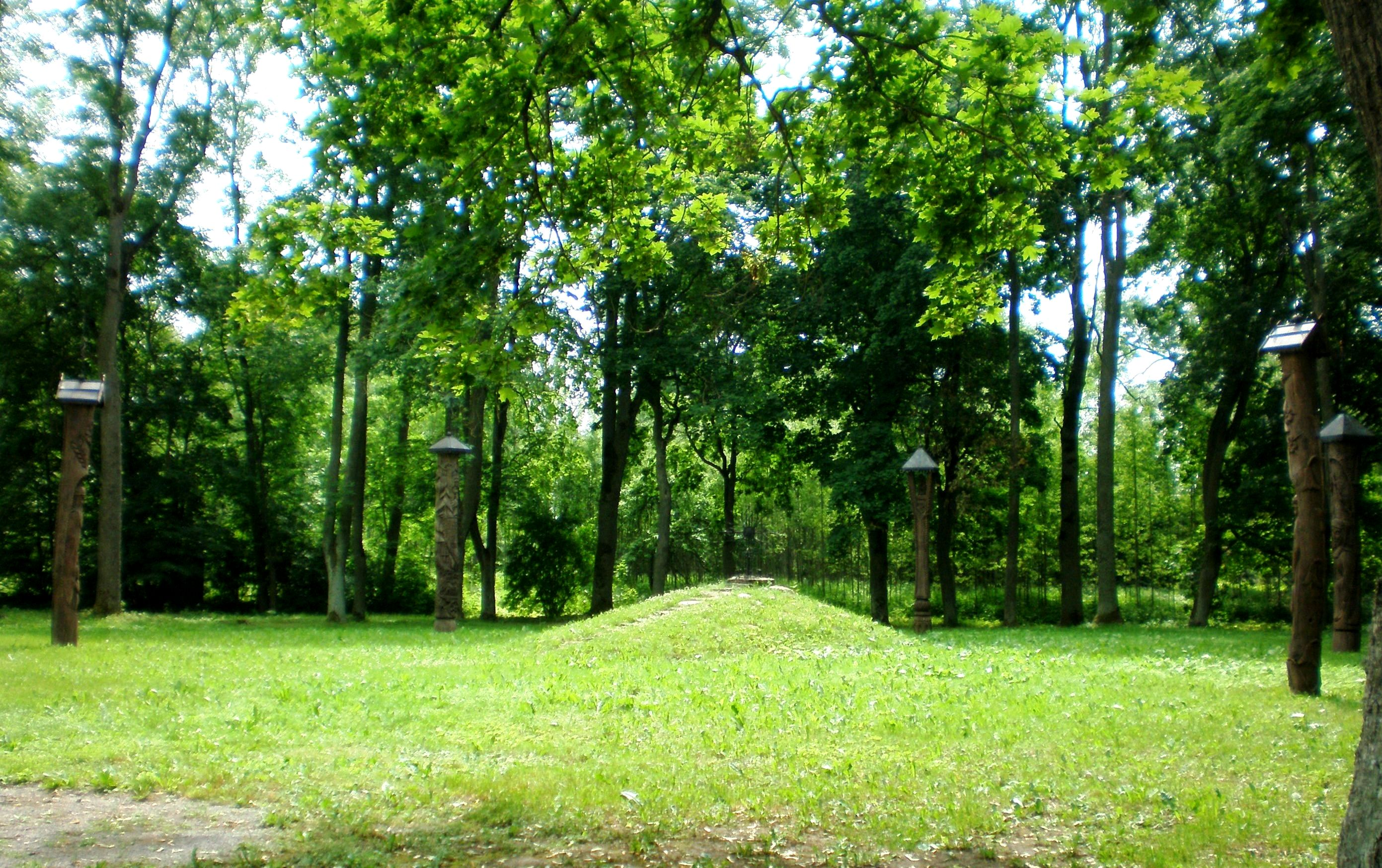
Burial ground of the January Upraise rebels

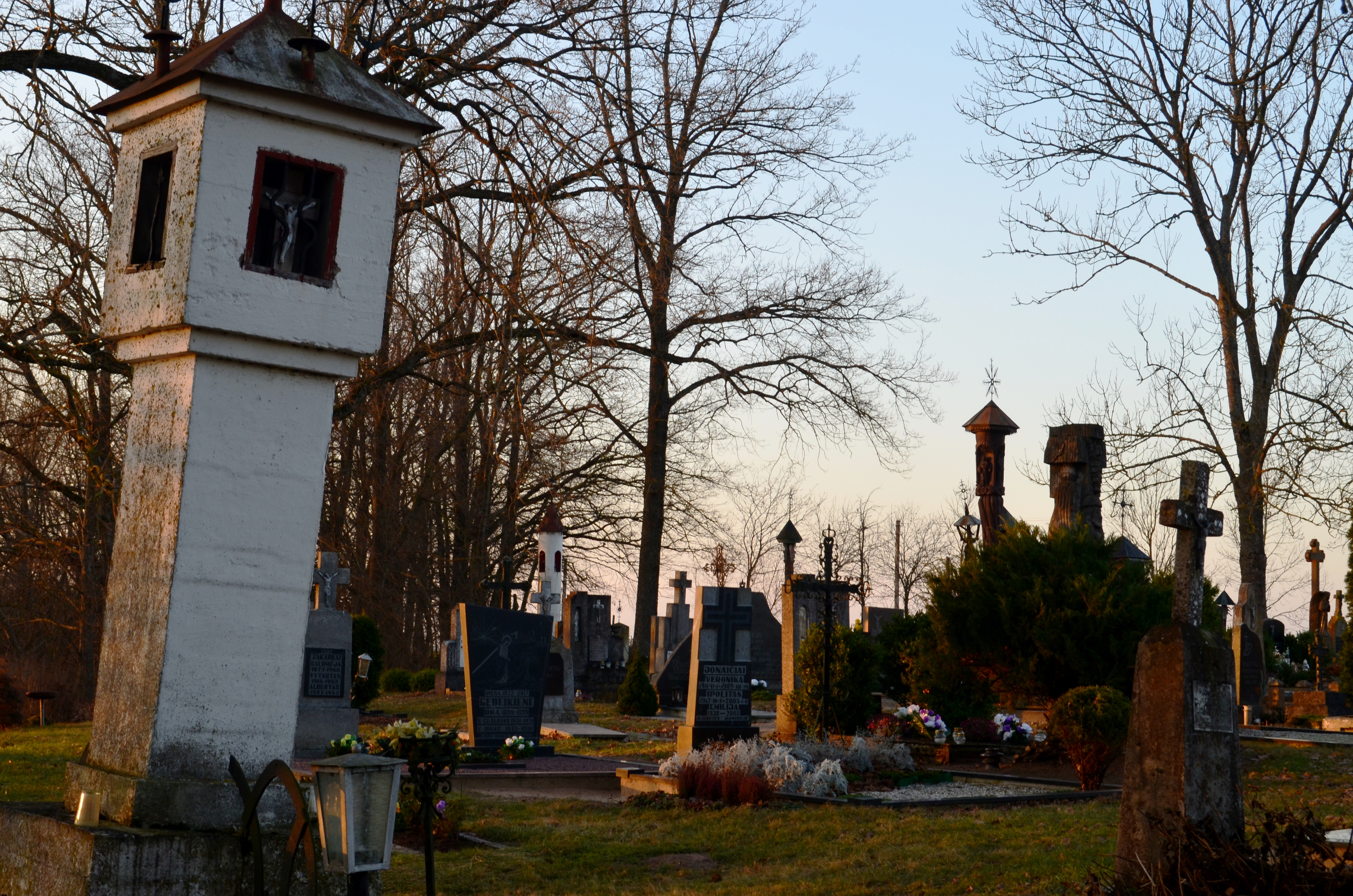
Cemetery
