= Bartkūniškis Manor =

Coordinates: 55°27′26″N 23°39′54″E

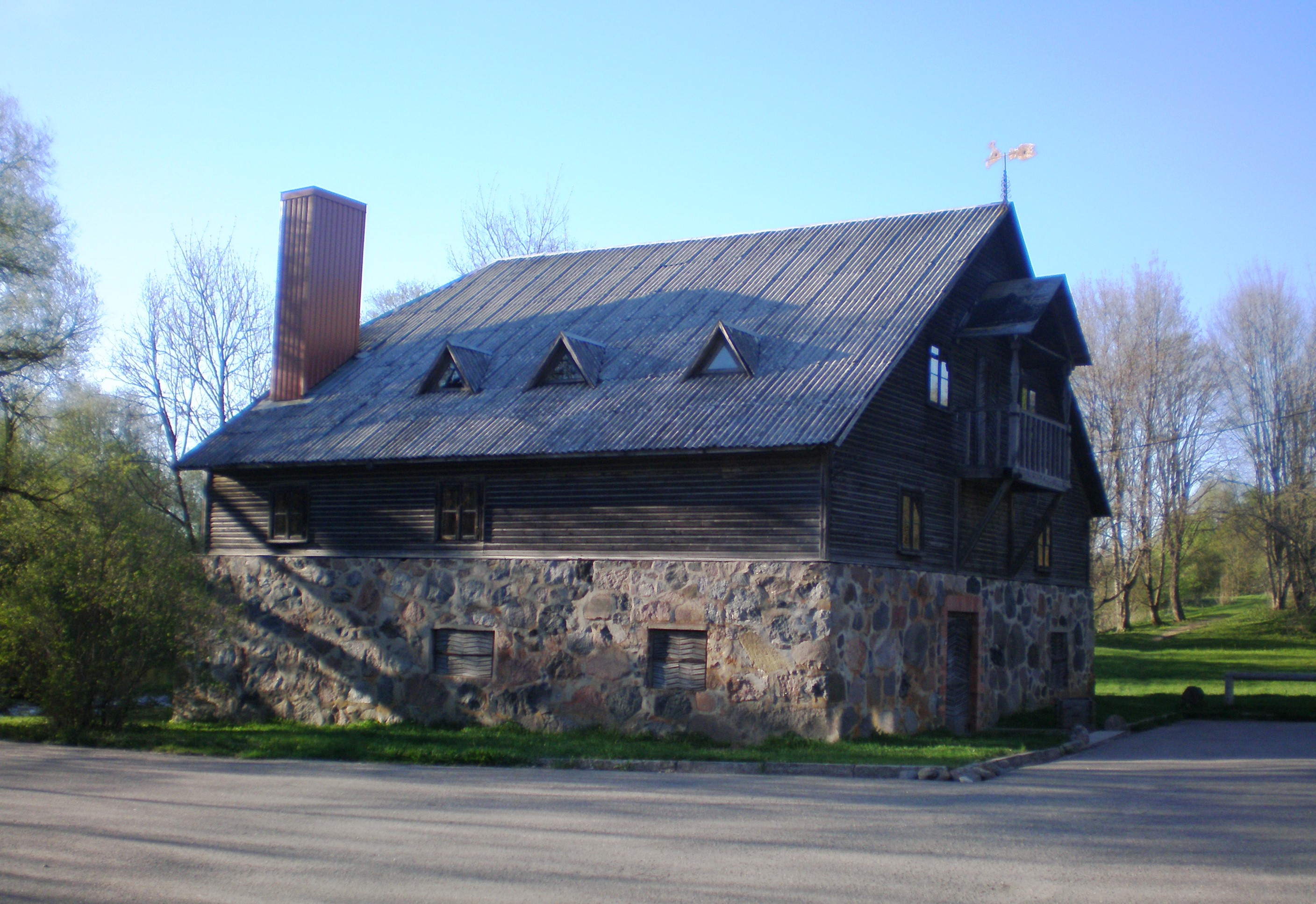
Former manor watermill

Bartkūniškis Manor is a former residential manor in Barkūniškis village, Kėdainiai district.
