= Meškuičiai =

- Town
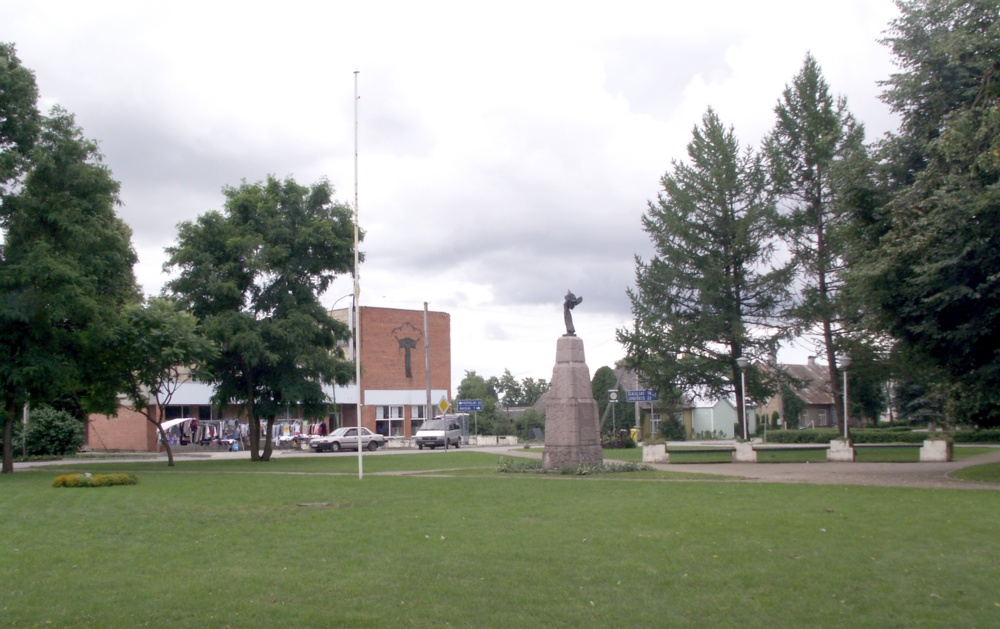
- Freedom monument in the central square

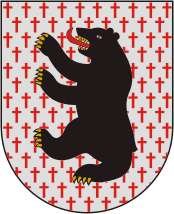
- Coat of arms

- Location in Lithuania
- Coordinates: 56°04′10″N 23°28′30″E
- Country: Lithuania
- Ethnographic region: Samogitia
- County: Šiauliai County

Population (2021)
  - Total: 856
- Time zone: UTC+2 (EET)
  - Summer (DST): UTC+3 (EEST)

Meškuičiai is a small town in Šiauliai County in northern-central Lithuania. It is closely associated with the famous Hill of Crosses, a major site of Catholic pilgrimage.

== Geography and location ==
Meškuičiai lies in the Šiauliai County of northern-central Lithuania, not far from the city of Šiauliai itself.

== Demographics ==
According to the 2011 census Meškuičiai had a population of 1,056 residents. Over the following decade, the town experienced a gradual population decline, with the 2021 census recording 856 inhabitants, reflecting an average annual decrease of 2.1%. Covering an area of 1.375 square kilometers, the town had a population density of approximately 622 people per square kilometer in 2021. The 2021 census also revealed a gender distribution in Meškuičiai of 390 males (45.6%) and 466 females (54.4%), indicating a slightly higher proportion of females in the population.

== Landmarks ==
=== The Windmill of Meškuičiai ===
One of the most notable historical landmarks in Meškuičiai is its windmill, constructed around 1867. The building of the windmill is attributed to an unknown clergyman, and its history is closely tied to both Meškuičiai and the nearby village Rupeikiai. The windmill changed hands several times, with ownership passing through the Šliažas and Šerys families before eventually being acquired by Stasys Stočkus. After Stočkus's tragic death in an accident involving the mill machinery, the windmill was used communally until it was taken over by the local collective farm during the Soviet era.

=== Hill of Crosses ===
For a long period the parish of Meškuičiai was famous for its Hill of Crosses, on which stood more than three thousand crosses, each one with its own history. People would come on foot to erect crosses they carried with him, from all over, including Latvia, Estonia, Belarus, and the United States.
