= Czamara =

Traditional Polish frock coat lined with fur and decorated with frogs

The Czamara (from Polish; plural czamary; also known in English as Cracow/Kraków coat; (Note: A portrait of Tadeusz Kościuszko in czamara is described in Pan Tadeusz; George Rapall Noyes translates it as Cracow coat, Bill Johnston as Kraków coat.) originally Spanish: zamarra, French: chamarre, German: Tschamarre, Arabic: samur - fur coat) was a type of outer garment in the Polish–Lithuanian Commonwealth.

The czamara was introduced to the Commonwealth in the 16th century, likely through Hungary from Turkey. Initially, it was primarily worn by priests, but by the 18th century, it had gained popularity among burghers who were not of noble status. During the 19th century, the czamara became a prominent element of male Polish national and patriotic attire.

The czamara itself was a type of frock coat that reached the hips or thighs. It had a cut similar to a kontusz, a traditional Polish garment. The coat was lined with fur and featured long, straight, narrow sleeves, a lined narrow high collar, and decorative frogs for fastening.

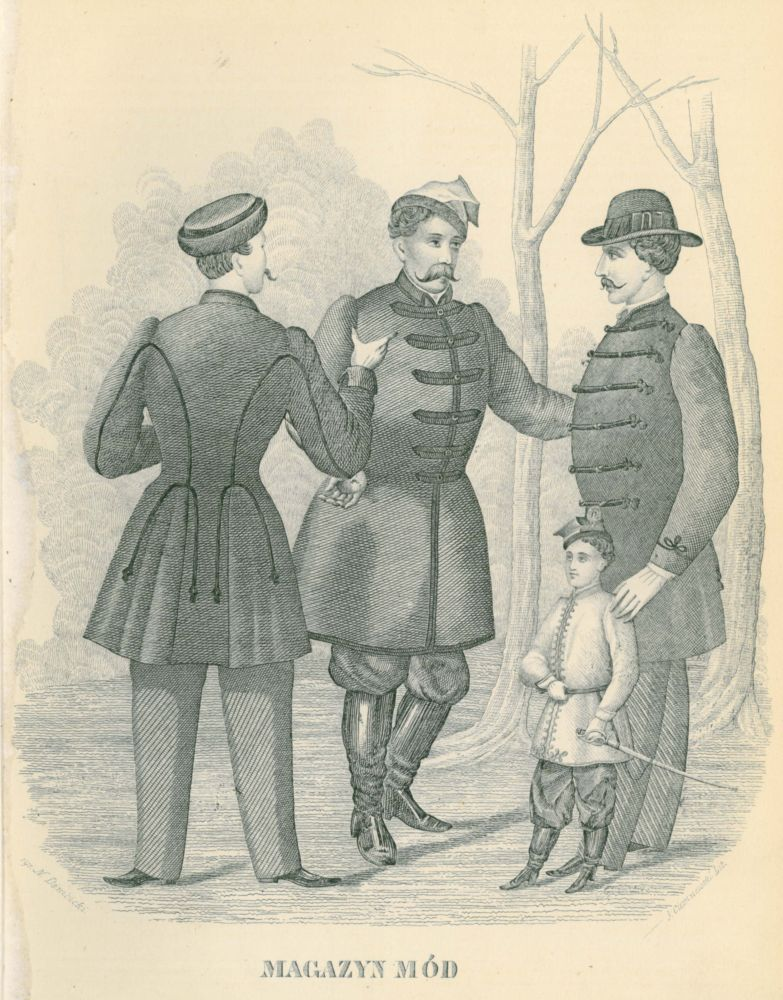
Men in czamaras

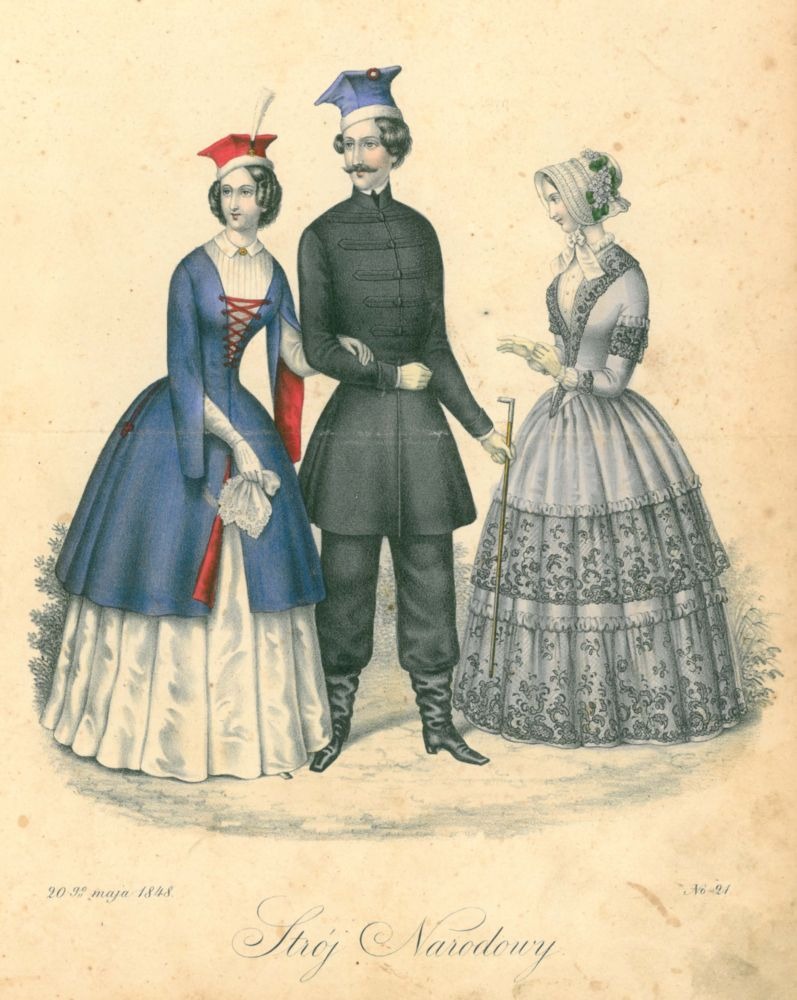
Man wearing a czamara

== Bibliography ==
- Kubalska-Sulkiewicz, Krystyna; Bielska-Łach, Monika; Manteuffel-Szarota, Anna (1996). Słownik terminologiczny sztuk pięknych. Warszawa: Wydawnictwo Naukowe PWN. ISBN 83-01-11785-0.
- Encyklopedia Polski, Kraków 1996 s. 110.
