= Žaiginys =

- Town
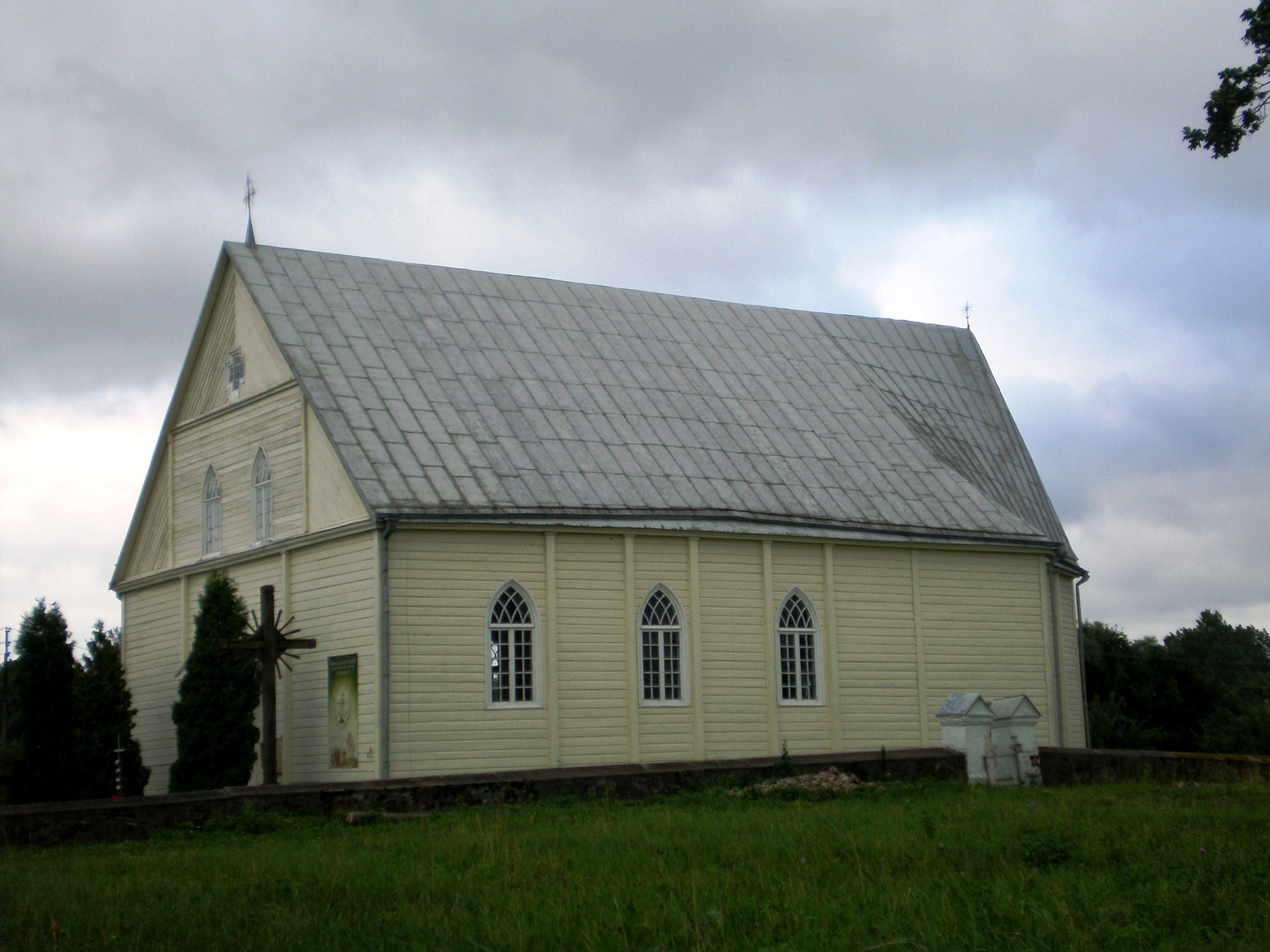
- Žaiginys church

- Location in Lithuania
- Coordinates: 55°29′30″N 23°20′0″E
- Country: Lithuania
- Ethnographic region: Aukštaitija
- County: Kaunas County

Population (2011)
  - Total: 335
- Time zone: UTC+2 (EET)
  - Summer (DST): UTC+3 (EEST)

Žaiginys is a small town in Kaunas County located in central Lithuania. As of 2011 it had a population of 335.

== History ==
Žaiginys manor was first mentioned in 1575. There was a brewery making vodka and bitter. The first Žaiginys church was built in 1664 (in 1684 according to other sources). In 1716 Žaiginys manor was granted trading privileges. The manor owner, Jacob Nagurski, invited Franciscans to Žaiginys in 1762. The Franciscan monastery operated from 1764 to 1832. In 1907-1915 there was a private school that later burnt down. During the Second World War, the Soviet Revenge partisans were active.

In Soviet times, the town was the center of the neighborhood and the central settlement of the Žaiginis Soviet farm (founded in 1959).
