= Visuotinė lietuvių enciklopedija =

Universal Lithuanian-language encyclopedia

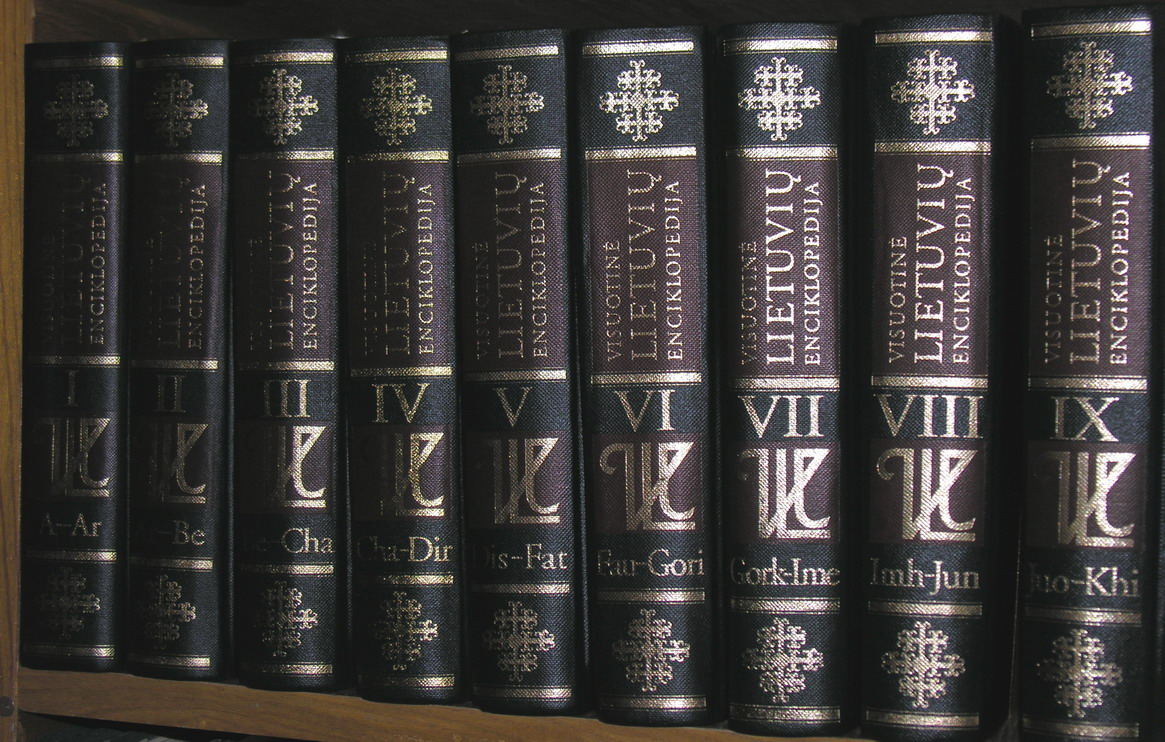
Volumes of the Visuotinė lietuvių enciklopedija

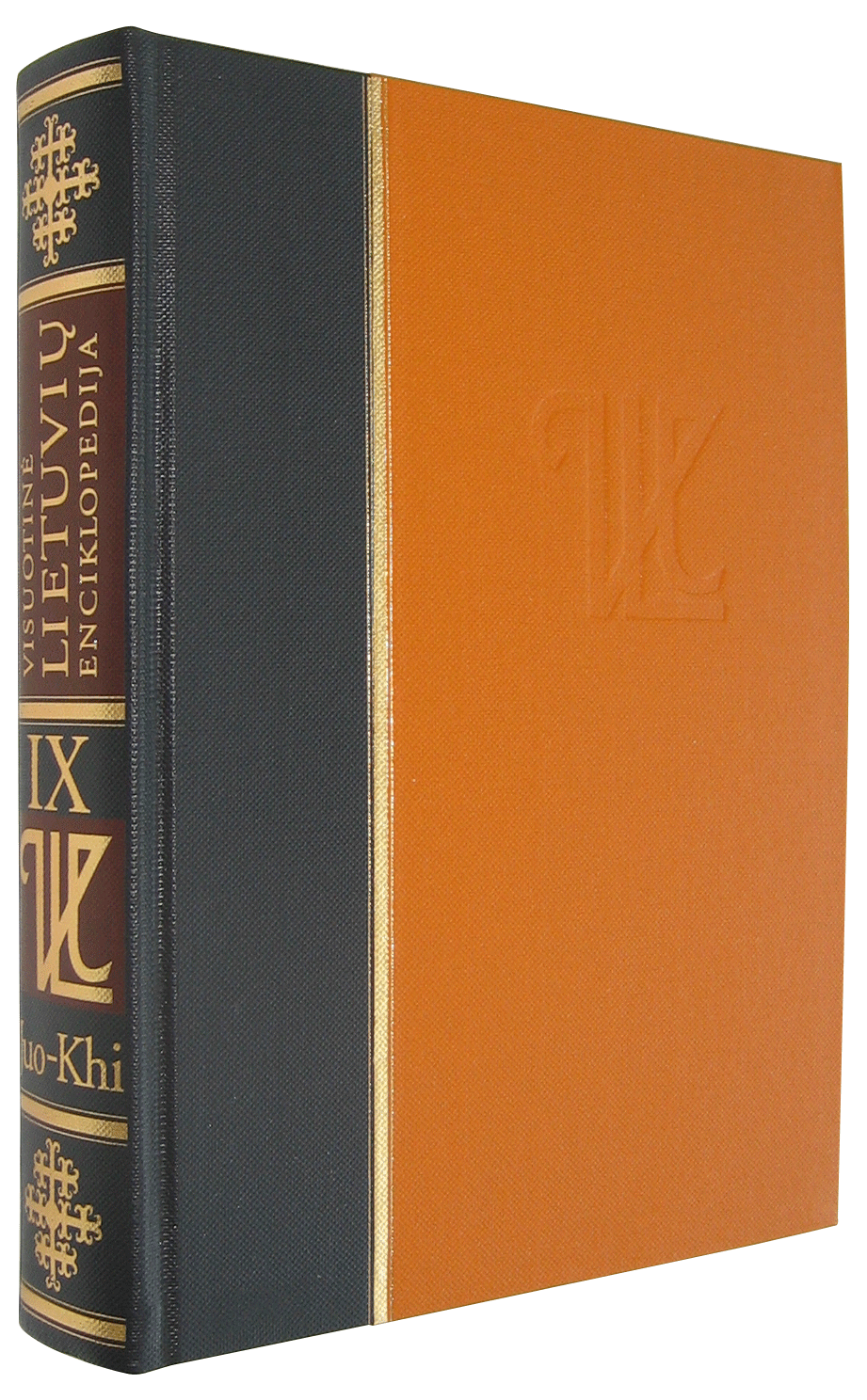
The 9th volume

The Visuotinė lietuvių enciklopedija or VLE (transl. Universal Lithuanian Encyclopedia) is a 25-volume universal Lithuanian-language encyclopedia published by the Science and Encyclopaedia Publishing Institute from 2001 to 2014. VLE is the first published universal encyclopedia in post-Soviet Lithuania (it replaces the former Lietuviškoji Tarybinė Enciklopedija which was published in thirteen volumes from 1976 to 1985). The last volume, XXV, was published in July 2014. An additional volume of updates, error corrections, and indexes was published in 2015. The encyclopedia's twenty-five volumes contain nearly 122,000 articles and about 25,000 illustrations. Since June 2017, VLE is published as an online encyclopedia being updated to present day.

== Description ==
VLE is an encyclopedia published in Lithuanian; therefore, it focuses on Lithuania, Lithuanians and Lithuanian topics (Lithuanian personalities, organizations, language, culture, national activities). These articles make up about 20–25% of all articles and illustrations (about 6,000 articles are intended to describe personalities alone).

Separate thematic articles contain articles on Lithuanian studies - about Lithuania and Lithuanians. Much space in the VLE is devoted to topics banned or ignored during the Soviet era: Lithuanian statehood, the history of the Catholic Church, the army, Lithuania's resistance to Nazi and Soviet occupation, the history of the Lithuanian state, Lithuania Minor. Juozapas Girdzijauskas stated that VLE "will objectively acquaint the society with the world's culture, capture the modern level of science, promote the humanistic values of humanity, and help the Lithuanian people to overcome the Soviet ideology".

== Editorial board ==
Coordination and editing of Visuotinė lietuvių enciklopedija is carried by prominent Lithuanian scholars:

- prof., habil. dr. Algirdas Ambrazas;
- prof. habil. dr. Antanas Bandzaitis;
- dr. Jonas Boruta;
- prof. habil. dr. Juozapas Girdzijauskas;
- prof. habil. dr. Bronius Grigelionis;
- prof. habil. dr. Leonas Kadžiulis;
- doc. dr. Algirdas Kiselis;
- prof. habil. dr. Vytautas Kubilius
- Dr. Elvyra Janina Kunevičienė;
- prof. habil. dr. Alfonsas Skrinska;
- prof. habil. dr. Antanas Tyla;
- akad. prof. habil. dr. Zigmas Zinkevičius

Additionally, editorial-scientific boards of 23–25 scholars were established for the main science branches. In total, there were 2,957 authors.

== Published volumes ==
- 2001, T. I: A-Arktinis oras, 799, [1] p. + Annex (30 p.)
- 2002, Vol. II: Arktis-Beketas, 799, [1] p. + Annex (31 p.)
- 2003, Vol. III: Beketeriai-Chakasai, 800 p. + VLE. main conventional signs (1 sheet)
- 2003, Vol. IV: Chakasija–Diržių kapinynas, 832 p. + Appendix (64 p.)
  - 6200 articles (816 Lituanist articles, in addition, 167 more articles have Lituanist parts; together it amounts to 19.6%), 722 illustrations, 347 portraits and 7 maps. In addition, there is an Annex to volumes III and IV (there are authentic and adapted forms of proper names of the languages using the Latin-based alphabet, which are not described in separate articles).
- 2004, Vol. V: Dis–Fatva; Appendices to Volume I to IV, 800 p.
- 2004, Vol. VI: Fau-1–Goris, 832 p. + Annex (64 p.)
- 2005, Vol. VII: Gorkai–Imermanas, 800 p.
- 2005, Vol. VIII: Imhof-Junusas, 847, [1] p. + Appendix 1 (77 p.)
  - 4300 articles (about 22 per cent – 680 articles – Lithuanian), about 670 illustrations, 230 portraits, 55 maps).
- 2006, Vol. IX: Juocevičius–Khiva, 800 p.
- 2006, T. X: Khmerai-Krelle. Appendices to Volume I to X, 831, [1] p. + Annex 1 (55 p.)
- 2007, Vol. XI: Kremacija-Lenzo, 816 p.
- 2008, Vol. XII: Lietuva, 848 p.
- 2008, Vol. XIII: Leo–Magazyn, 800 p.
- 2008, Vol. XIV: Magdalena–México, 800 p.
- 2009, Vol. XV: Mezas–Nagurskiai, 800 p.
- 2009, Vol. XVI: Naha–Omuta, 800 p.
- 2010, Vol. XVII: Ona–Perizonius, 800 p.
- 2010, Vol. XVIII: Perk–Pražvalgos, 816 p.
- 2011, Vol. XIX: Preadaptacija–Reutov, 816 p.
- 2011, Vol. XX: Rėva–Salzuflen, 816 p.
- 2012, Vol. XXI: Sama–Skłodowska, 848 p.
- 2012, Vol. XXII. Skobelcyn–Šalavijas, 848 p.
- 2013, Vol. XXIII. Šalcinis–Toliušis, 848 p.
- 2014, Vol. XXIV. Toljatis–Venizelas, 848 p.
- 2014, Vol. XXV. Venk–Žvo, 848 p.
- 2015, Volume additions. Abaluja–Żwikiele, 624 p.

== See also ==
- Lithuanian encyclopedias
- Academic History of Lithuania
- List of online encyclopedias
