= Science and Encyclopaedia Publishing Centre =

- Status: Branch of Martynas Mažvydas National Library
- Founded: March 21, 1997; 28 years ago
- Founder: Government of Lithuania
- Country of origin: Lithuania
- Headquarters location: Gedimino ave. 51, LT-01109 Vilnius
- Distribution: Nationwide
- Key people: Dr. Arturas Mickevičius
- Publication types: Scientific literature, encyclopedias
- Official website: melc.lnb.lt

Old logo

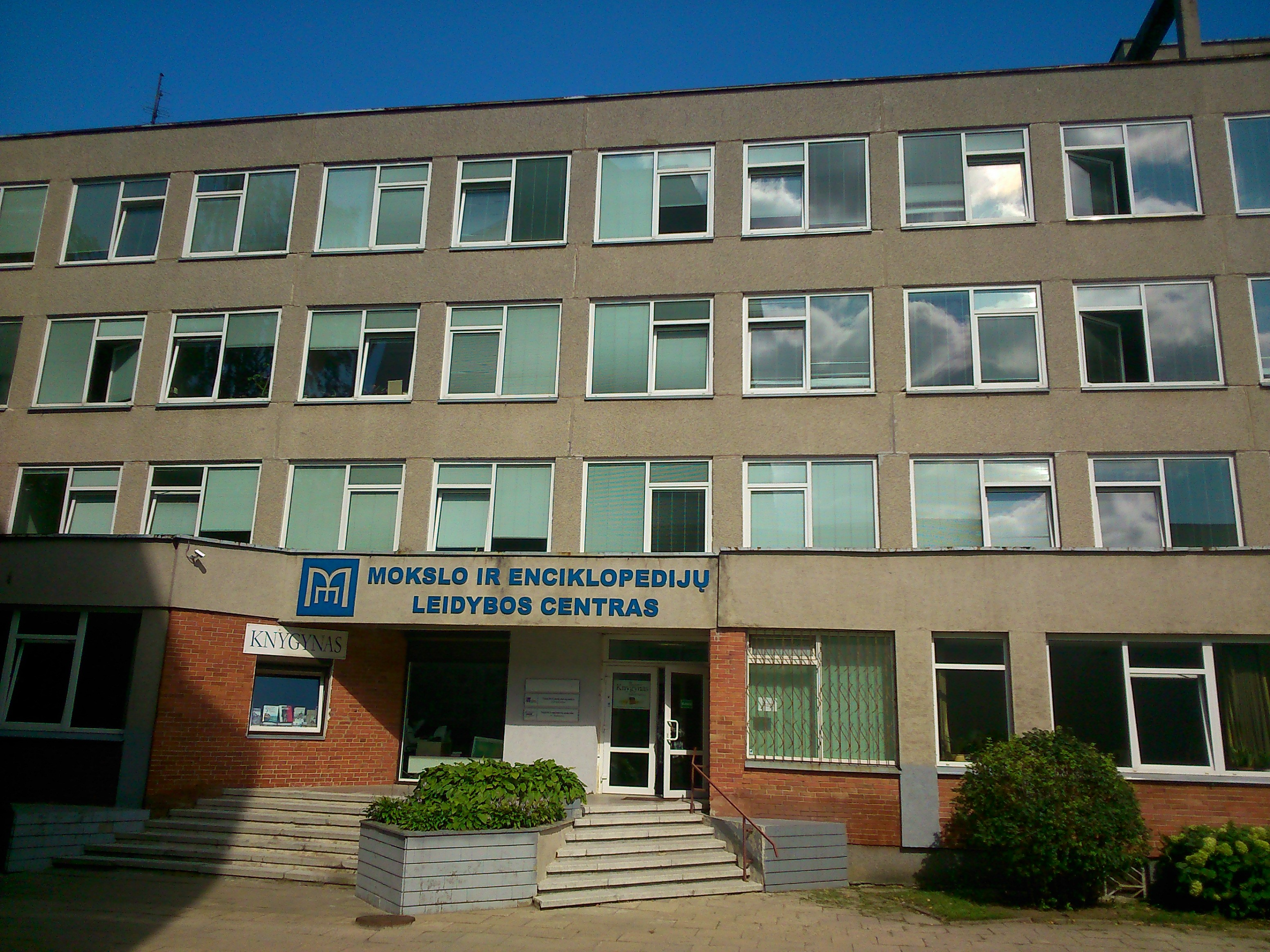
Office of the centre in Karoliniškės, Vilnius

The Science and Encyclopaedia Publishing Centre (previously: Science and Encyclopaedia Publishing Institute, Lithuanian: Mokslo ir enciklopedijų leidybos centras or MELC) is a Lithuanian publishing house that specializes in encyclopaedias, reference works, and dictionaries. The Institute, headquartered in Vilnius, is supported by the Lithuanian Republic's Ministry of Education and Science.

The publishing house was established in 1997, as a reorganisation of Science and Encyclopaedia Publishers. The latter publishing house was founded in 1992 after the merger of Mokslas Publishing with the State Encyclopaedia Publishers.

Its major project is the preparation and publication of the 25-volume Visuotinė lietuvių enciklopedija which was completed in 2015. It also publishes several specialized encyclopaedias, standard and specialized dictionaries, reference books, research monographs focusing on social science, natural science, and technology, scientific works by international authors, and popular science books.

== Major publications ==
- Visuotinė lietuvių enciklopedija (Universal Lithuanian Encyclopedia)
- Mažosios Lietuvos enciklopedija (Encyclopaedia of Lithuania Minor) (4 vols.)
- Muzikos enciklopedija (Encyclopaedia of Music) (3 vols.)
- Technikos enciklopedija (Technical Encyclopaedia) (4 vols.)
- Žemės ūkio enciklopedija (Encyclopaedia of Agriculture) (3 vols.)
- Baltų religijos ir mitologijos šaltiniai (Sources for the Baltic Religions and Mythology) (4 vols.)
- Lietuvių vardų kilmės žodynas (Etymological Dictionary of Lithuanian Names)
- Senoji Europa (Old Europe) by Marija Gimbutas
- Vokiečių – lietuvių kalbų žodynas (German-Lithuanian Dictionary)
- Rusų – lietuvių kalbų žodynas (Russian-Lithuanian Dictionary)
- The History of the Lithuanian language by Zigmas Zinkevičius
