= Dubysa Regiment =

Lithuanian infantry regiment in the Uprising of 1863

- Active: 1863 March – mid-1863
- Type: Infantry
- Engagements: Uprising of 1863

Commanders
- First and only commander: Bolesław Kołyszko

The Dubysa Regiment (Polish: pułk dubiski; Lithuanian: Dubysos pulkas) was a Lithuanian infantry regiment commanded by Bolesław Kołyszko during the Uprising of 1863. It was named after the river Dubysa. The regiment fought mostly in the Kaunas Governorate and ranged in strength from 700 to 1,170 members.

== Formation ==
The Dubysa Regiment began as a rebel group that was organized near Kaunas by Bolesław Kołyszko in March 1863. It began forming in the coastal forests along the Dubysa, specifically between Čekiškė and Aukštdvaris. Kołyszko's group was joined by the groups of Bronislavas Žarskis and Antanas Norvaiša and the combined group was called the Dubysa Regiment.

Among the regiment's members was Aleksandras Vytartas, the vicar of Čekiškė's Church of the Holy Trinity, in which he announced the uprising's manifesto.

== Battles ==
Kołyszko led the regiment in fights against units of the Imperial Russian Army at Aukštdvaris on March 29, near Lenčiai on April 1, near Misiūnai on April 11.
