= State Funeral of the Leaders and Participants of the 1863–1864 Uprising =

2019 ceremony in Vilnius, Lithuania

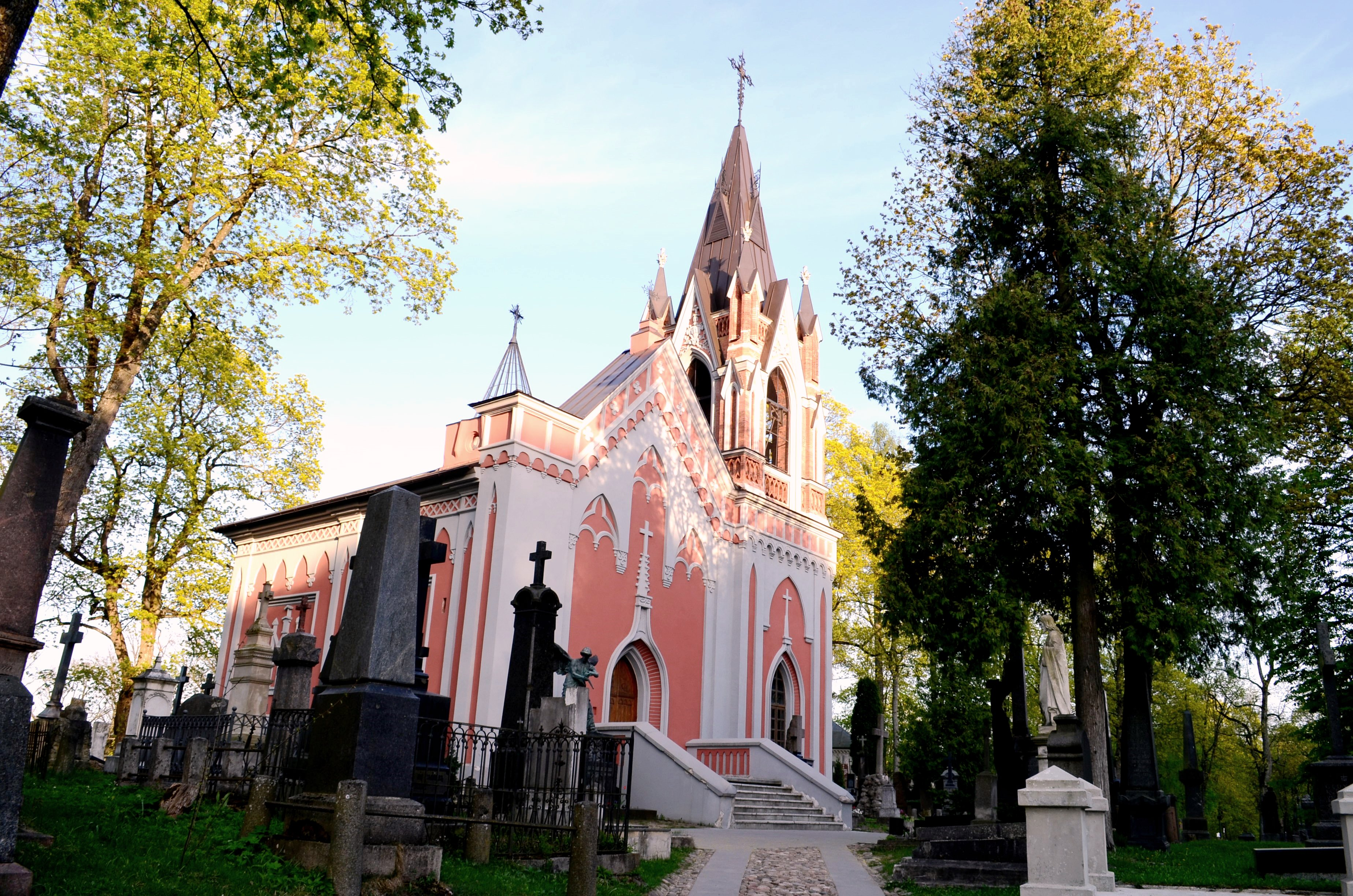
The final resting place of the leaders and participants of the Uprising – in the central chapel of Rasos Cemetery

State Funeral of the Leaders and Participants of the 1863–1864 Uprising was a state funeral ceremony held in Vilnius, at Rasos Cemetery on 22 November 2019, for the remains of leaders and participants of the 1863–1864 uprising discovered in Gediminas Hill in 2017. Delegations from neighboring countries attended the ceremony. This was the first international state funeral of this level held in Lithuania.

== Background ==
In early 2017, during emergency slope stabilization work on Gediminas Hill, the remains of 20 individuals were accidentally discovered. Experts confirmed that these were the remains of participants in the 1863–1864 uprising who were executed in Lukiškės Square in Vilnius and identified them. On 13 September 2017, a government commission was established to oversee the reburial and commemoration of the remains. It was decided, in cooperation with Poland, to hold a state funeral for them at Vilnius's Rasos Cemetery.

According to archive sources, 21 participants were executed in Lukiškės Square. Nine were shot, and twelve were hanged, among them Konstanty Kalinowski and Zygmunt Sierakowski. The identities of the insurgents were further clarified through the use of an execution calendar, as those executed on the same day were secretly buried in a single pit within the restricted area of Gediminas Hill. Detailed archaeological research covered a 170 m² area, revealing 14 graves, where remains or fragments of 20 individuals were found.

== Funeral ceremony ==
The funeral ceremony took place on 22 November 2019, beginning at 8:30 am with the removal of the coffins from the inner courtyard of the Palace of the Grand Dukes of Lithuania to the Cathedral Basilica, accompanied by a solemn formation in Cathedral Square. The public had an opportunity to pay respects to the uprising leaders and participants in the Cathedral. The midday Mass was attended by the presidents of Lithuania and Poland, bishops, military chaplains, and other guests from Poland, Ukraine, Belarus and Latvia. Belarusians were able to attend with special visas. K. Kalinowski’s family members, who had traveled from Belarus, also attended.

After farewell speeches, the coffins were carried out of the Cathedral. Two leaders’ coffins were transported on a military caisson, while others were carried by modern hearses. The long procession moved through Vrublevskio, Šventaragio, Pilies, Didžioji, Aušros Vartų, Pelesos and Rasos Streets to Rasos Cemetery.

The final farewell took place at the Rasos Cemetery Chapel, where the uprising leaders and participants were laid to rest. Commemorative gun salutes were fired. The ceremony included hymns sung in Lithuanian, Polish, and Belarusian. LRT broadcast images from the Cathedral and the chapel on outdoor screens. At the end of the ceremony, in the evening, the chapel was opened to the public. Members of the Lithuanian Scouting Association, the Polish Scouting Association (harcers) and the Lithuanian Riflemen's Union stood as an honor guard.

== Related events ==
On the eve of the event, the Lithuanian National Museum opened an exhibition exploring the lives and tragic fates of the insurgents. Books related to the uprising theme were presented, including "Memoirs" by Apolonia Dalevskytė-Sierakauskienė (first-time Lithuanian translation), and "The Path to Death and Resurrection of the 1863–1864 Uprising Insurgents" (covering the dramatic events in Lukiškės Square). The Vilnius Picture Gallery at the Chodkiewicz Palace hosted an exhibition about the 1863–1864 uprising in Lithuania. Conferences and roundtable discussions involving historians from Lithuania, Poland, and Belarus were also organized.

== Those buried ==
The columbarium at the Rasos Cemetery Chapel on 22 November 2019, became the final resting place for 20 individuals:

- Zygmunt Sierakowski
- Konstanty Kalinowski
- Viktoras Komorovskis
- Adam Bitis
- Antanas Lūšys
- Michal Kaszkiel
- Józef Drazdziński
- Jakub Kriščiukajtis
- Jonas Ulinauskas
- Stanislovas Iszora
- Antanas Mackevičius
- Boleslovas Koliška
- Rapolas Orvidas
- Jonas Sokolovskis
- Julijonas Serbentas
- Ludwik Żakowicz
- Józef Gieysztor
- Antanas Urbšys
- Antanas Zarembikas
- Kajetonas Parčevas
