= Bolesław Kołyszko =

Polish-Lithuanian leader of the January Uprising

Bolesław Kajetan Kołyszko
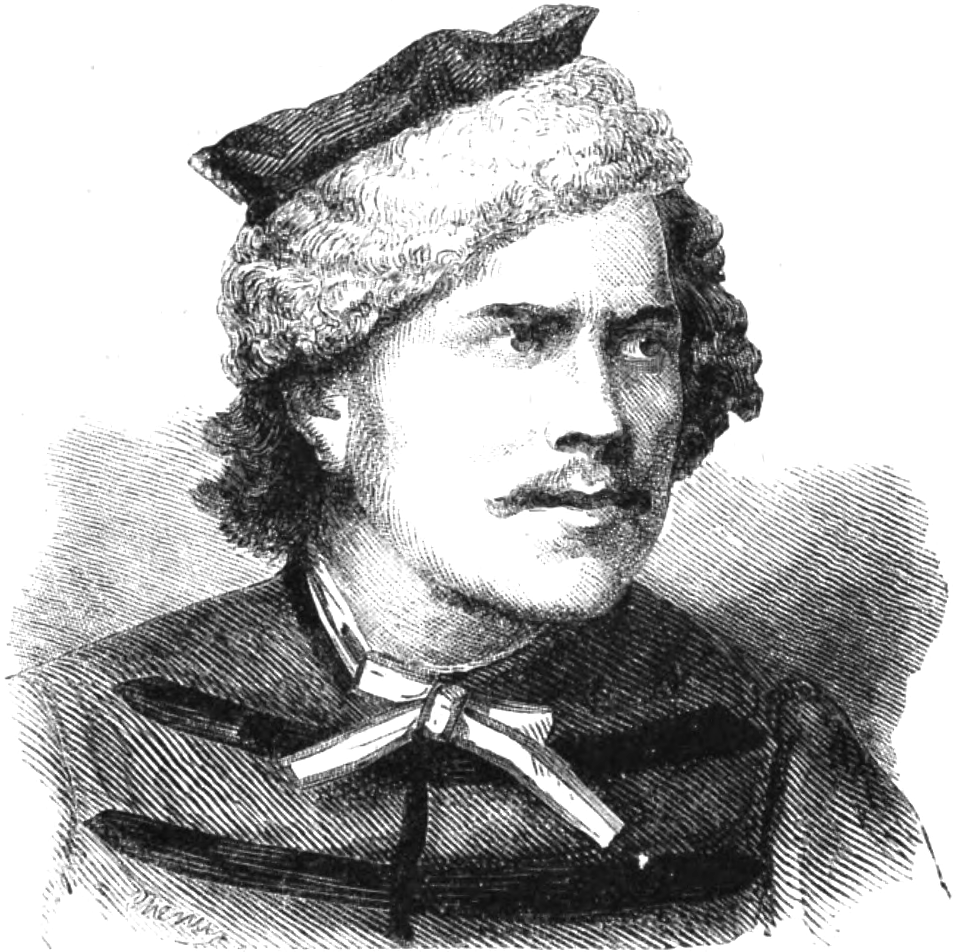
- Born: 7 August 1837; Navickiškės
- Died: 9 June 1863 (aged 25); Vilnius
- Military career
- Nicknames: Rutkowski, Szyszka

Bolesław Kajetan Kołyszko alias Rutkowski, Szyszka (Lithuanian: Boleslovas Kajetonas Kolyška; 1838 – 9 June [O.S. 28 May] 1863) was one of the Polish-Lithuanian leaders in the January Uprising.

== Early life ==
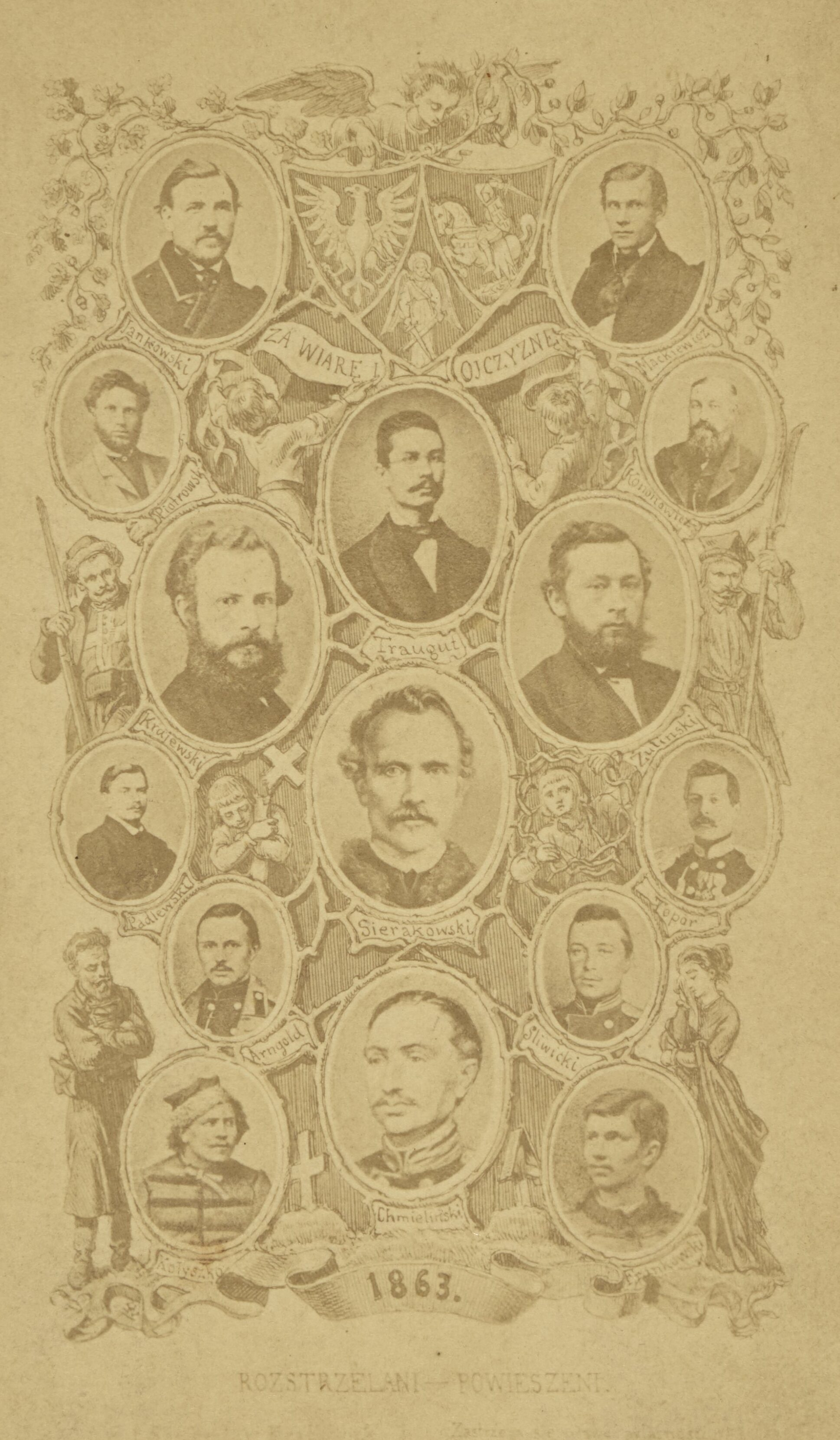
Kołyszko's photograph among the portraits of executed leaders of January Uprising. For the Faith and the Homeland 1863, executed - hanged by Awit Szubert

Kołyszko was born into a petty noble family as a son of Wincenty Kołyszko and his wife from the Jursza family. He had an older brother, Feliksas Kolyška, who also fought in the January Uprising. Boleslovas Kołyszko graduated from the Vilnius Gymnasium and studied law in the University of Moscow. According to Dawid Fajnhauz, he might have graduated from Lida gymnasium instead of Vilnius. In the University of Moscow, Kołyszko was part of the Polish students association called "Ogół". He was arrested in 1861 for his involvement in student demonstrations in Lida. At the end of 1861, after a short imprisonment, he emigrated to Italy, where he met Ludwik Mierosławski. First in Genoa and later in Cuneo, he studied in the Polish Military School. Although the Military School acquainted Kołyszko with the military, it was impossible to develop his military talent or even qualify him for a commander in such a short time.

== Uprising of 1863 ==
After the start of the uprising he went back to Lithuania. On 21 March 1863, he began the uprising between Čekiškė and Panevėžys. In a few days, his unit included 400 men and was also joined by the unit led by the priest Antanas Navaina. As he organized the rebel group near Kaunas during March, it was joined by the groups of Bronislavas Žarskis and Antanas Norvaiša. The combined group was called the Dubysa Regiment. The regiment had three battalions, with the battalion commanders being Bronislavas Žarskis, Antanas Norvaiša and Juozas Radavičius. Kołyszko led his 400 men strong regiment in fights against units of the Imperial Russian Army at Aukštdvaris on March 29–30. He then fought near Lenčiai on April 1 (together with the unit of Tomas Kušleika), near Misiūnai on April 11.

By Zygmunt Sierakowski's order, he led a rebel column - two battalions and a cavalry unit that fought in the battle of Biržai. On May 7, Kołyszko was the first from the rebel columns to reach the designated spot, Medeikiai. They were attacked by Russian forces, but when Sierakowski came and joined the battle, the Russian attack was repelled. Kołyszko and Sierakowski's aide-de-camp Jarosław Kossakowski were supposed to take wounded the Sierakowski and transport him out of the country, but they were captured on May 10. During the interrogation he blamed Sierakowski for the uprising's failure and underlined that he was doing everything for the homeland. He was hanged by a court-martial on June 9, 1863. The remains were secretly buried in Vilnius' Gediminas' Hill.

== Commemoration ==
Kołyszko already during his lifetime became the hero of songs and poems. One of them called Przeszły troski i frasunki... ("Troubles and sorrows are gone...") is dated 28 March 1863, the authorship of it is attributed to Vilnius-born poet Jerzy Laskarys. Alongside Kołyszka, it praises other leaders of the uprising in Samogitia, Lithuania and Belarus. Kołyszko is portrayed in it as a revolutionary folk leader:

Original text	English translation
Wyprostować ostre kosy, Wezwać włościan, jak Bóg każe I zawołać wniebogłosy: Do Kołyszki! Za Niewiażę!	Straighten the sharp scythes, Call the peasants, as God commands, and cry out in a loud voice: To Kołyszko! Beyond the Nevėžis!

His remains were found in 2017 during the works designed to strengthen Gediminas' Mountain. On 22 November 2019, the remains were solemnly buried in the Columbarium of the Rasos Cemetery Chapel in Vilnius.

== Bibliography ==
- Čepėnas, Pranas (1957). "Boleslovas Kolyška". Lietuvių enciklopedija (in Lithuanian). Vol. 12. Boston. p. 223.
- Fajnhauz, Dawid (1968). "Bolesław Kołyszko". Polski Słownik Biograficzny (in Polish). Vol. 13. Wrocław. pp. 84–85.
- Maksimaitienė, Ona (2006). "Boleslovas Kajetonas Koliška". Visuotinė lietuvių enciklopedija (in Lithuanian). Vol. X (Khmerai-Krelle). Vilnius: Mokslo ir enciklopedijų leidybos institutas. p. 372.
- Istorikas.lt (30 September 2013). "Kolyška Boleslovas Kajetonas" (in Lithuanian).
- Bairašauskaitė, Tamara (2019). 1863-1864 m. sukilėlių kelias į mirtį ir atgimimą (in Lithuanian). Vilnius: National Museum of Lithuania. ISBN 978-609-478-031-8.
- kam.lt (22 October 2019). "1863–1864 m. sukilimo vadų ir dalyvių valstybinių laidotuvių ceremonija vyks 2019 m. lapkričio 22 d." (in Lithuanian).
- Kupiškio etnografijos muziejus (2021). "1863 – 1864 m. sukilimo keliu po Šiaurės Rytų Aukštaitiją". etnografijosmuziejus.lt (in Lithuanian).
- D. c. n. (19 December 1864). "Monografja oddziałów powstańczych na Żmudzi" [A monograph of insurgent units in Samogitia.]. Ojczyzna (in Polish) (124) – via cyfrowe.mnk.pl.
