= Feliks Kołyszko =

Polish-Lithuanian participant of 1863 January Uprising

- Born: 1837; Lyda County
- Died: 19 February 1889; Menton, France

Feliks Kołyszko alias Śmiałyński (Lithuanian: Feliksas Kolyška; 30 May 1837 in Vilnius – 19 February 1889 in Menton) was a Polish-Lithuanian participant of the 1863 January Uprising. Feliks (Feliksas) was the older brother of Bolesław Kołyszko (Lithuanian: Boleslovas Kolyška) a notable leader of the January Uprising that was aimed at the restoration of the Polish–Lithuanian Commonwealth.

== Early life ==
Kołyszko was born in Vilnius into a petty noble family as a son of Wincenty Adolf Kołyszko and his wife Apolina Bańkowska or, according to other sources a woman from the Jursza family. In 1851, at the age of fourteen and while a student of the Vilnius Gymnasium, he was arrested and sent to an Imperial Russian Army disciplinary battalion. He remained in it until 1861. In 1862 he was arrested for wearing a national costume and possession of illegal patriotic leaflets.

== Uprising of 1863 ==
During the January Uprising of 1863, he commanded a rebel unit in the counties of Trakai and Kalvarija. During spring, Feliks Kołyszko operated in the area between Jieznas and Butrimonys together with other rebels. On May 12, he and his unit, totaling 36 soldiers, fought with an Imperial Russian guard company at Žilinai. On August 7, Kołyszko and his group of about 185 rebels were attacked by 300 hussars and cossacks near Stračiūnai.

Kołyszko and his unit were remembered in a folk song of Vėžionys:

Original text	English translation
Ar tai pora, ar tai lyška, žalnierius rokavo Atamanas Kolyška	Be it raining, Be it pouring, Arranges the soldiers Hetman Kołyszko

Thereafter he emigrated to France, where he worked in Chemins de fer du Nord and lived in Pontoise. On 17 April 1870 married Antonina Katarzyna Eudoksja Wróblewska in Paris. After the death of the first wife, he married Maria de Gozdawa Gostkowska on 6 July 1879. Kołyszko died on 18 February 1889 and was buried in Trabuquet cemetery in Menton.

== Bibliography ==
- Butkienė, Lina (3 October 2013). "Iš Butrimonių praeities" (in Lithuanian).
- Bernardinai.lt (28 June 2013). "Laiko juosta: žymiausi 1863 metų sukilimo mūšiai (II dalis)" (in Lithuanian).
- Čepėnas, Pranas (1957). "Feliksas Kolyška". Lietuvių enciklopedija (in Lithuanian). Vol. 12. Boston. p. 223.
- Dacka-Górzyńska, Iwona; Górzyński, Sławomir (2015). Polacy pochowani na cmentarzach Nicei i Mentony [Poles buried in the cemeteries of Nice and Mentona] (in Polish). Warsaw: DiG. ISBN 978-83-7181-781-6.
- Dunderis, Vilmantas (20 September 2013). "1863-1864 m. sukilimas: Krikštonių mūšis" (in Lithuanian).
- Kozłowski, Eligiusz (1968). "Feliks Kołyszko". Polski Słownik Biograficzny (in Polish). Vol. 13. Wrocław. pp. 369–370.
- Kuzmickas, Vytautas (13 April 2013). "1863-ieji Verknės ir Nemuno krašte: kovos, viltys ir netektys (IV)". Nemuno krašto laikraštis "Naujasis Gėlupis" (in Lithuanian).
- Ružancovas, A. (1938). "Kautynės prieš 75 m." Trimitas (in Lithuanian). 37: 898.
