= Institute for Nobles =

Type of school

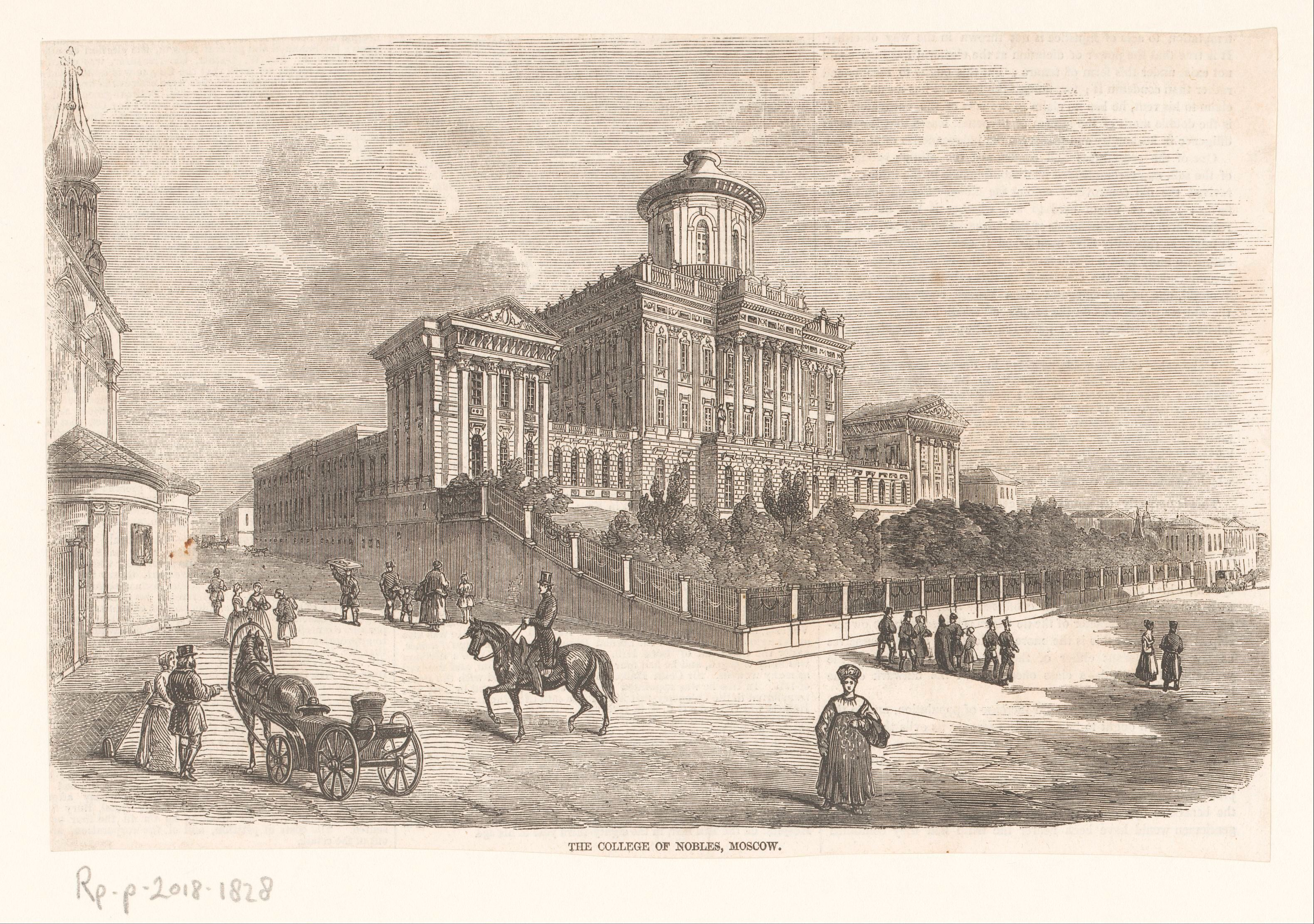
The College of Nobles, Moscow in 1856

Institute for Nobles (Russian: Дворянский Институт) was a form of boys-only boarding school in the Russian Empire that provided secondary education in the 19th century. It was similar to a high school or gymnasium but was only open to boys from noble families, and students were usually required to live on the premises. Tuition and accommodation in these institutions were free, and they were considered as a form of support to the impoverished noble families for their service to the Russian crown.

The first Institute for Nobles was opened in Moscow in 1833. In 1838 the 2nd Gymnasium of Vilna (in what is now Lithuania) was reorganized into an Institute for Nobles. In 1843, the Penza Institute for Nobles was opened, followed by an institute in Nizhny Novgorod in 1844. There was also an Institute for Nobles in Warsaw.

Most of these Institutes for Nobles were closed in 1863. Only the Alexander II Nizhny Novgorod Institute for Nobles survived into the twentieth century, but it was closed after the October Revolution.

Graduates of these institutes had the rights of the graduates of gymnasiums, in addition they had rights to enter universities without entrance examinations.

== See also ==
- Institute for Noble Maidens
- Page Corps
