= Battle of Genėtiniai =

Battle during the January Uprising

- Part of the January Uprising
| Date | 21 April 1863 |
| Location | Near Genėtiniai 55.55°N 24.53°E |
| Result | Lithuanian victory |

Belligerents
| Russian Empire | Lithuanian insurgents |

Commanders and leaders
| Major Kavro | Zygmunt Sierakowski |

Strength
| Unknown | 300 |

Casualties and losses
| 40 dead, 60 wounded | 2 dead, 4 wounded |

The Battle of Genėtiniai (21 April 1863) took place during the January Uprising. The battle was fought by Lithuanian insurgents led by Zygmunt Sierakowski against the units of the Imperial Russian Army under Major Kavro near the Lithuanian village of Genėtiniai, located about 6 kilometres (3.7 mi) west of Raguva.

== Background ==
Throughout April, Samogitian rebel groups gathered in the forests of Kremeciškiai (in what is now Kėdainiai District Municipality). They were led by Zygmunt Sierakowski himself, whose chief of staff was Stanisław Laskowski. On April 18, the rebels of Bolesław Kołyszko joined Sierakowski, while Antanas Mackevičius' joined on the night from April 18 to 19. Mackevičius' platoon consisted mostly of villagers.

A group of the Imperial Russian army, composed of several infantry companies, an Uhlan squadron and Cossacks, under Major Kavro, marched to Raguva's forests.

== Preparation ==
Sierakowski, commanding more than 300 people, went to Raguva's forests through Truskava, Anciškis and Vadokliai. At the Genėtiniai Village, they took a good position in the bushes. Along the swampy meadow, there ran a poor road. The rebels' left wing was led by Kołyszko, the middle by Sierakowski, and in the right wing were the scythemen led by Mackevičius. They had to attack the confused enemy and cut off his retreat. The well-conceived ambush was a great success.

== Battle ==
The insurgents allowed the leading Cossacks to pass by without. Then came the infantry, which was seated in carriages and did not expect to meet the enemy in such an unfavourable position. Suddenly, there were shots. The enemy soldiers were immediately confused. Although the Russian infantry's shooting was directed by officers and non-commissioned officers, they fired poorly.

Seeing falling friends, slain and wounded, the Russians began attacking the right wing of the rebels seeking to shake off the enemy and withdraw. Here they were met by Mackevičius with his scythemen. The Russians tried to attack the rebels with bayonets, but the scythemen repulsed the enemy's attacks as many as six times. Wanting to withdraw, the Russians completely disintegrated and began fleeing to the swamps. The swamps were wet and the fugitives quickly got sunk up to the knees and even deeper. Many Russians were shot here, with their good-quality rifles and ammunition passing into rebel hands.

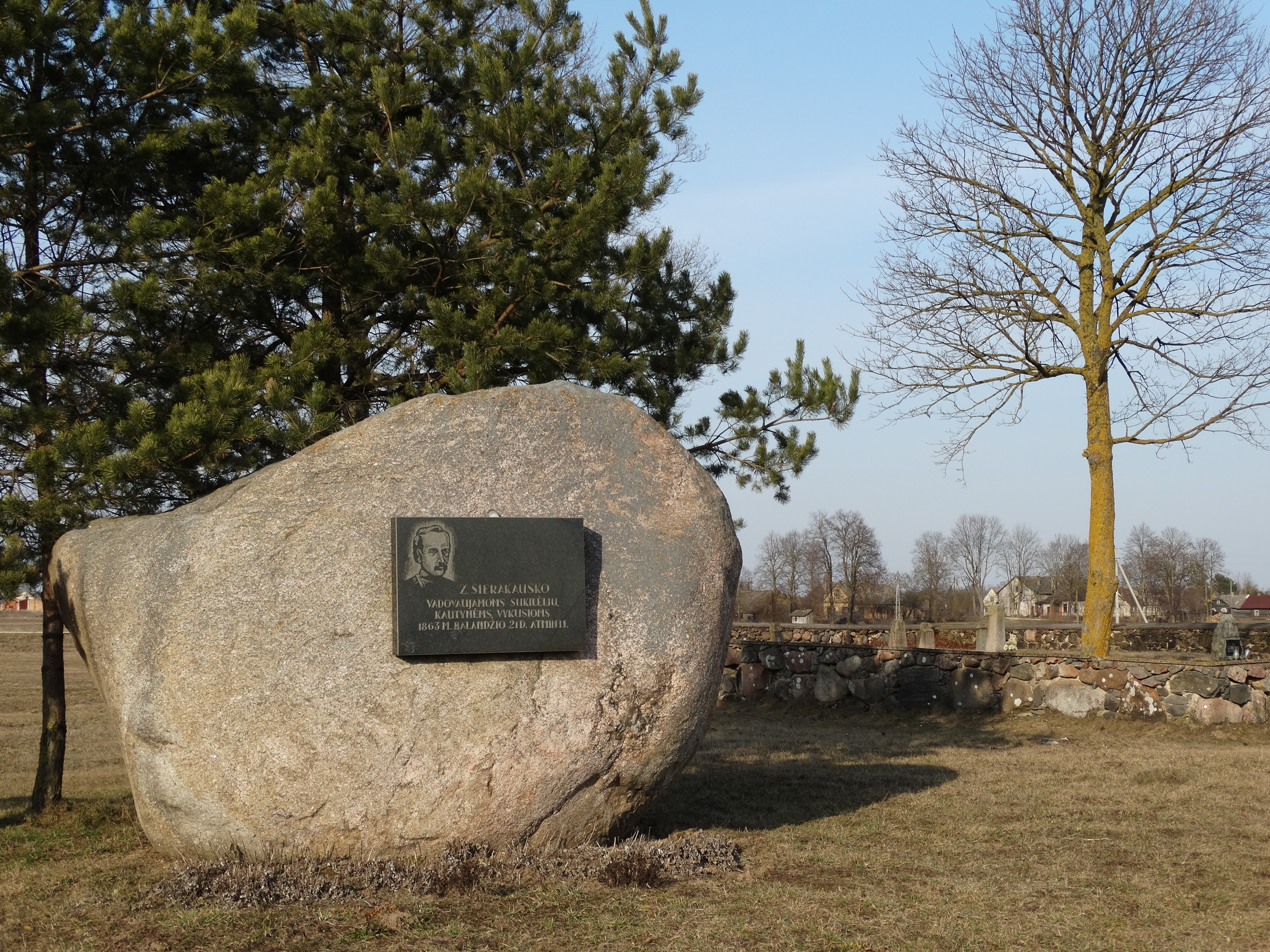
Memorial stone of the Battle of Genėtiniai

== Outcome ==
The battle ended with the complete defeat of the enemy. More than 40 Russian soldiers were killed and 60 injured. A large number of good rifles and considerable booty passed to rebel hands. Sierakowski's position was so comfortable that the insurgents' casualties were only 2 killed and 4 injured.

== Legacy ==
The battle is commemorated with a plaque at the battle-site.

== Sources ==
- Labutis, Gintaras (4 May 2013). "Laiko juosta: žymiausi 1863 metų sukilimo mūšiai". Bernardinai.lt (in Lithuanian).
