= Czerna, Lesser Poland Voivodeship =

Czerna
- Village
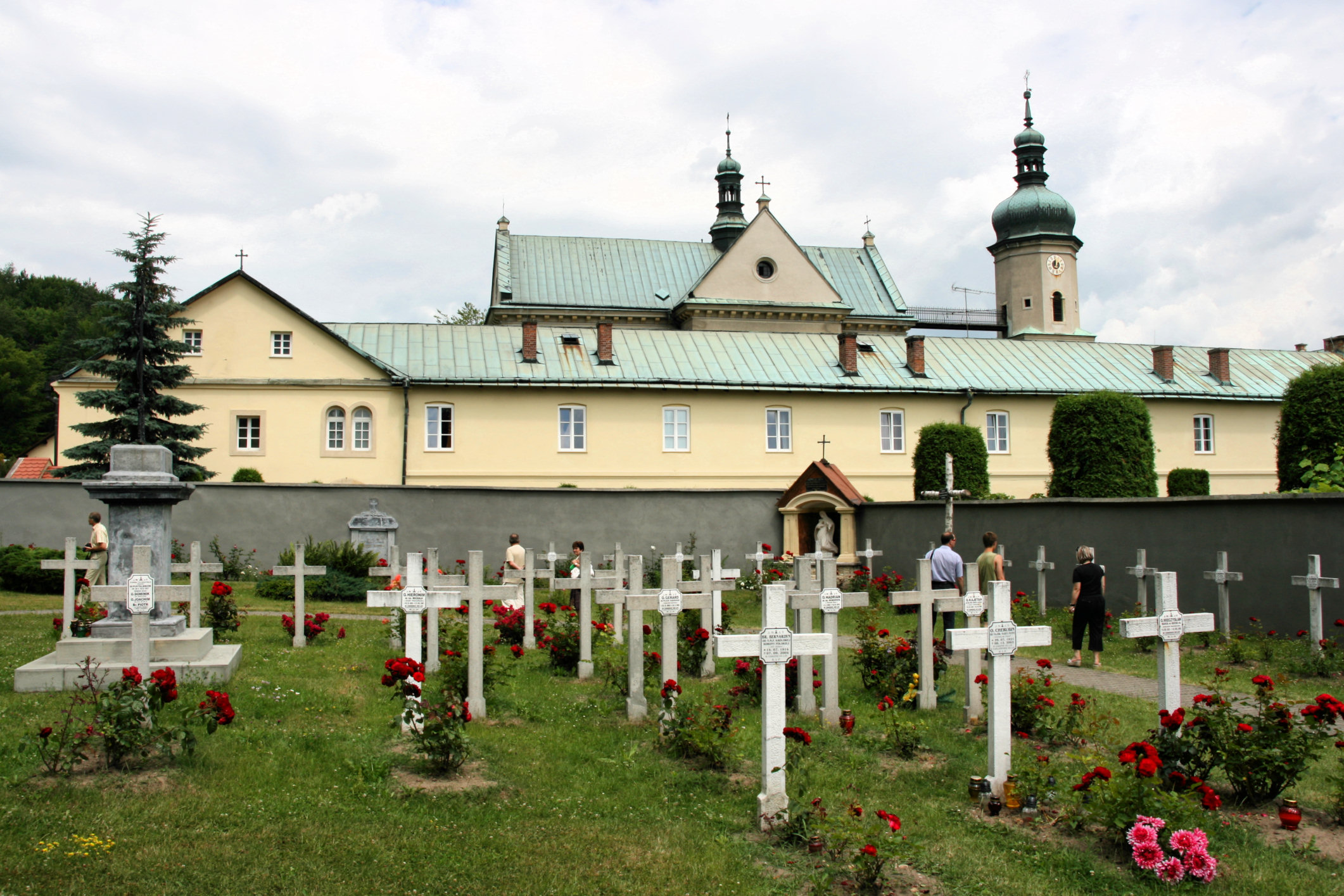
- Monastery of Discalced Carmelites in Czerna

- Location within Poland
- Coordinates: 50°10′21″N 19°37′21″E
- Country: Poland
- Voivodeship: Lesser Poland
- County: Kraków
- Gmina: Krzeszowice

Population
  - Total: 1,252
- Time zone: UTC+1 (CET)
  - Summer (DST): UTC+2 (CEST)
- Vehicle registration: KRA

Czerna [ˈt͡ʂɛrna] is a village in the administrative district of Gmina Krzeszowice, within Kraków County, Lesser Poland Voivodeship, in southern Poland. The village is located in the historical region of Lesser Poland.

== Sights ==
The local landmark is the Monastery of Discalced Carmelites with the Saint Elijah church founded by noblewoman Agnieszka Tęczyńska. There is also a grave of Polish General of the November Uprising Aleksander Błędowski, funded by his friend, General Stanisław Klicki.

== Demographics ==
Religions: Roman Catholicism, Jehovah's Witnesses (1%).

In 1870, the village had a population of 642.

== See also ==
- Raphael Kalinowski
