= Battle of Biržai =

1863 battle

Coordinates: 56°18′45″N 24°52′10″E

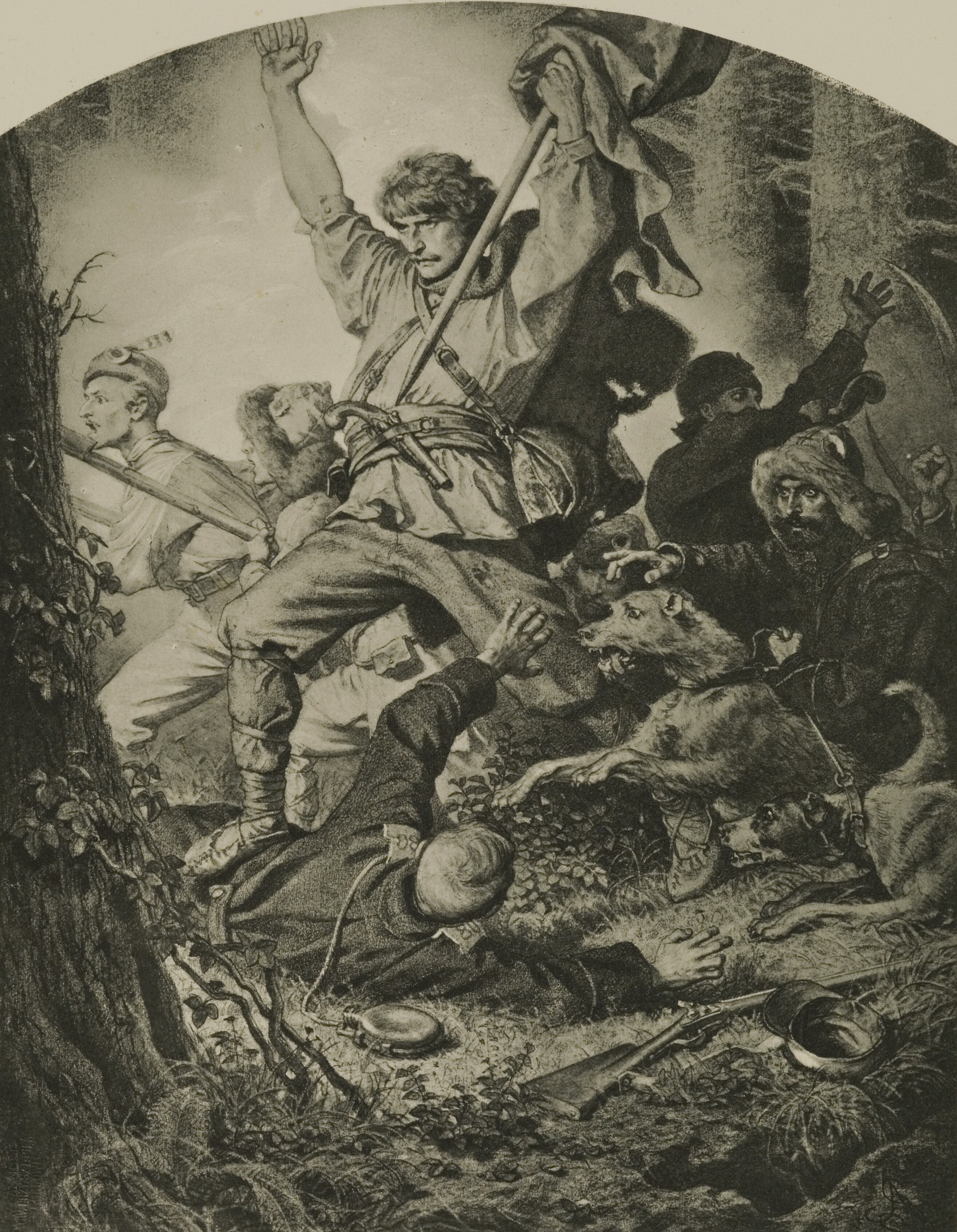
Battle of Biržai

The Battle of Biržai was a series of skirmishes during the January Uprising. They took place on May 7–9, 1863, in the area of Lithuanian town of Biržai, at the time part of the Russian Empire's Kaunas Governorate. Lithuanian rebels commanded by Zygmunt Sierakowski, clashed here with the Imperial Russian Army.

In early May 1863, Sierakowski and his men tried to break through Russian cordon to Courland, where a maritime transport with weapons was announced. Rebel forces concentrated in Biržai and Medeikiai, were attacked by the Russians. After several clashes, Sierakowski's unit was destroyed, which ended the insurrection in Lithuania.

== Battle of Medeikai ==
On May 7, first clash took place near Medeikai, 10 kilometers north of Biržai. Sierakowski divided his party into three columns, and ordered to march to Biržai. They were faced by troops of the Imperial Russian Army, which included Cossacks, uhlans, infantry and Finnish riflemen. Left rebel column of Bolesław Kołyszko was attacked by the Russians. After a heavy fight, the rebels, reinforced with additional forces sent by Sierakowski, managed to kill 65 and wound 75 Russians.

== Battle of Gudiškis ==
On May 8, Russian command sent reinforcements to the unit which had been defeated in Medeikai the day before. Near the Gudiškis village (3 kilometers southeast from Medeikai), they clashed with Sierakowski. A scythemen attack was fought off by the Russians, and the battle ended in rebel defeat. Sierakowski, himself wounded, lost 200 men (killed and wounded), and ordered a withdrawal, nominating Ignacy Laskowski new commandant of the party.

== Battle of Šniurkiškiai ==
On May 9, 1863, new rebel commandant, Ignacy Laskowski, ordered his forces to camp in a forest near Šniurkiškiai. The rebels were completely taken by surprise, when the Russians attacked them. For one hour, priest Antanas Mackevičius defended rebel positions, but was defeated and rebel survivors fled from battlefield.

== Sources ==
- Stefan Kieniewicz (1983). Powstanie styczniowe (in Polish). Warszawa: Państwowe Wydawnictwo Naukowe. ISBN 83-01-03652-4.
