= Langakiai =

- Village
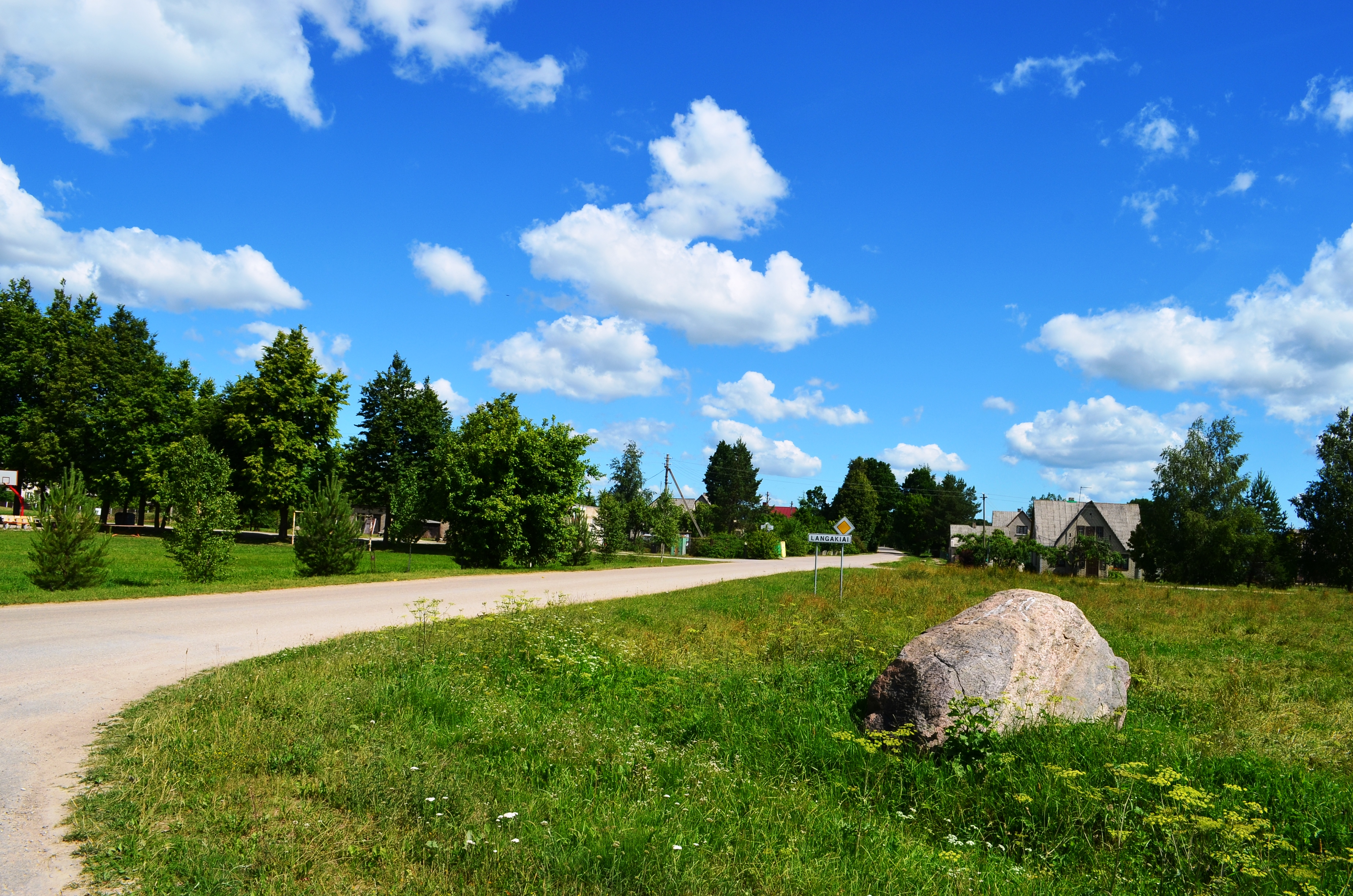

- Location in Lithuania Langakiai (Lithuania)
- Coordinates: 55°10′19″N 23°34′59″E
- Country: Lithuania
- County: Kaunas County
- Municipality: Kėdainiai district municipality
- Eldership: Pernarava Eldership

Population (2011)
  - Total: 196
- Time zone: UTC+2 (EET)
  - Summer (DST): UTC+3 (EEST)

Langakiai (formerly Russian: Лангоки, Polish: Łangoki) is a village in Kėdainiai district municipality, in Kaunas County, in central Lithuania. According to the 2011 census, the village had a population of 196 people. It is located 4 kilometres (2.5 mi) from Čekiškė, by the Ringovė river. There is a library, a medicine station, a farm.

During the Soviet era Langakiai was the "Oak" kolkhoz center.

== Demography ==
Historical population

Year	Pop.	±% p.a.
1820	109	—
1902	66	−0.61%
1923	49	−1.41%
1959	99	+1.97%
1970	74	−2.61%

Year	Pop.	±% p.a.
1979	208	+12.17%
1985	231	+1.76%
1989	257	+2.70%
2001	245	−0.40%
2011	196	−2.21%

Source: 1902, 1923, 1959 & 1970, 1979, 1989, 2001, 2011
