= Zygmunt Sierakowski =

Polish general, independence activist, commander of the January Uprising

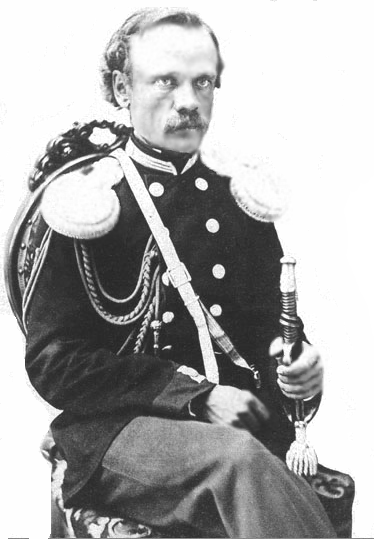
- Born: 19 May 1826; Lisów, Russian Empire
- Died: 27 June 1863 (aged 37); Vilnius, Russian Empire
- Spouse: Apolonia Dalewska (m. 1862)
- Relatives: Ignacy Sierakowski (father); Fortunata Morawska (mother)
- Military career
- Nickname: Dołęga

Zygmunt Erazm Gaspar Józef Sierakowski (Belarusian: Зігмунт Ігнатавіч Серакоўскі, Lithuanian: Zigmantas Sierakauskas; 19 May 1826, Lisów– 27 June 1863, Vilnius) was a Polish leader of the January Uprising in lands of the former Grand Duchy of Lithuania in the Polish–Lithuanian Commonwealth.

== Biography ==
=== Youth and education ===
He was born in Lisów in Volhynia as a son of Polish nobleman veteran Ignacy Sierakowski, who has fallen during the November Uprising in Volhynia, and his wife Fortunata née Morawska. Sierakowski grew up in an atmosphere of elevated patriotism. His mother dressed him as a girl, wanting to avoid him being drafted into the Cantonist Battalion as a son of a rebel. He was also influenced by his maternal grandmother, the widow of Kościuszko insurrection veteran Wiktor Morawski. As well as his uncles veterans of the November Uprising Felicjan Koszkowski and Kajetan Celermanth, the latter of whom was a member of Szymon Konarski's conspiracy, and took care of Zygmunt and his mother.

He graduated from a gymnasium in Zhytomyr. He then worked as a tutor at the home of Aleksander Piotrowski. In 1845 he entered the mathematics department of St. Petersburg University, later moving to the department of cameralism. During his studies, he was in contact with a secret patriotic and democratic circle associated with the Union of Polish Youth in Vilnius. He spent his vacations near Vilnius and in Volhynia, where he came into contact with the Ukrainian and Lithuanian peasants.

=== Forced service in the Russian army ===
On May 3, he was arrested in Pochaiv on charges of intending to cross the border into Galicia. As punishment, he was conscripted into the Special Orenburg Corps of the Russian army. He was sent first to the Novopetrovskoye fort on the Caspian Sea, then in September 1849 to Uralsk, and in October 1850 to Orenburg. Then in 1853 he stayed in Bashkiria, and in 1854 on the Syr-Darya River, at Fort-Perovsky (Ak-Mechet). There he studied Kyrgyz customs and language. In 1856 he arrived in St. Petersburg and was assigned to a dragoon regiment. Then in August 1857 he entered the General Staff Academy, from which he graduated in 1859. In the army he reached the rank of kapitan.

=== Conspiracy ===
In Orenburg he made contact by letter with Ukrainian poet Taras Shevchenko, but only met him in person in St. Petersburg. In St. Petersburg, he came into contact with the Russian left, most notably Nikolay Chernyshevsky, in whose magazine Sovremennik he took over the foreign chronicle section. He also joined the editorial board of the magazine Słowo, published by Jozafat Ohryzko. At the General Staff Academy, he founded an underground anti-Tsarist Polish-Russian circle, the leadership of which he soon handed over to Jarosław Dąbrowski. Within four years it included several hundred officers of various nationalities.

On behalf of the Ministry of War, he took steps to abolish corporal punishment in the army, and to this end, in May 1860, he traveled abroad, to London, Paris, Turin, Berlin and Vienna, to familiarize himself with the legislation of European countries. He used the trip to establish contacts with Polish émigrés, as well as to establish contacts with European politicians and rally them to the cause of Polish liberation. He spoke with Henry Palmerston, Napoleon III, Camillo Cavour, Alexander Herzen, Giuseppe Mazini, and Giuseppe Garibaldi. Of the Poles, he saw Joachim Lelewel, Ludwik Mierosławski, Józef Bohdan Zaleski, Seweryn Goszczyński. On his way back, he visited Poznań where he met with Aleksander Guttry and Warsaw where he met with Aleksander Guttry and probably with the leaders of the Reds. In the summer of 1862, he again traveled abroad. On his way back, he stopped in Kyiv and Vilnius, where he spoke with leaders of both the Whites and the Reds. He published the results of his work on criminal-military legislation in Morskoy Sbornik. For his merits, he was awarded the Order of St. Anna, Third Class.

Sierakowski was married with his wife Apolonia Dalewska in Kėdainiai, present-day Lithuania August 11, 1862. Most of the later leaders of the Lithuanian conspiracy gathered at the ceremony. He and his wife went to Warsaw, where he had already promised to take command of the future Lithuanian uprising, according to Dalewska's account. They then went to Paris. From there, Sierakowski alone went to Algiers, where he met with Gen. Aimable Pélissier to discuss penal and military matters. He then went to Warsaw, and from there, together with Jakub Gieysztor, the leader of the Whites in Lithuania, to Vilnius. On January 5, 1863, he returned to work at the Ministry of War.

Despite the outbreak of the uprising in Congress Poland, he continued to work in the ministry. At the time, he presented a memorandum to War Minister Dmitry Milyutin proposing the federation of the Polish lands with Russia on the basis of full equality of nationalities and religions, and in particular the equality of the "Little Russian" language with Polish and Russian. In February, a representative of the Reds, Jan Koziełł-Poklewski, came to him with a call to arms or, according to him, only a request for staff maps. Only after a visit from a representative of the Whites and the Administrative Department of the Provinces of Lithuania (Polish: Administrative Department of the Provinces of Lithuania) Aleksander Oskierka did Sierakovsky take leave and legally leave St. Petersburg on March 9, 1863.

=== Uprising ===
In Vilnius, he took over as head of the armed forces of the Kaunas Voivodeship. On April 15, he left for Kaunas, and two days later took command of the troops of Bolesław Kołyszko and Antanas Mackevičius; his forces numbered 400–500 men. It was much less than he expected. In order to save the uprising, he attempted to stir up the Samogitian and Latvian peasants, and planned to make contact with the Russian "Zemlya i volya" and strike toward Courland and Dünaburg.

On April 21 he was victorious in the battle of Genėtiniai, then on April 26 at Karsakiškis, in the Panevėžys County. After this battle, several commanders active in the area joined forces under Sierakowski's command. His forces grew to 2,600 men. He divided his forces into three columns and began a march north. On May 7, the three-day long battle of Biržai with Gen. Ivan Ganetsky's army began. On the first day, the combined forces of Kołyszko and Sierakowski were successful near Medeikai. The next day, at Gudiškis, Sierakowski's forces, reinforced by Mackevičius' unit, continued the fight. At the end of the day, however, Sierakowski was injured and had to give up command Ignacy Laskowski. On the third day at Šniurkiškiai, the insurgents were defeated. Sierakowski was taken to one of the nearby manors, where the Russians captured him the next night. He was transported to Vilnius and placed in a hospital.

=== Execution ===
Sierakowski was operated on twice. On June 16, he was interrogated, but refused to testify. On May 25, 1863, Mikhail Muravyov took power in Northwestern Krai, determined to suppress the uprising with terror. On June 23, Sierakowski was sentenced to death in absentia. On June 26, his pregnant wife Apolonia Dalewska visited him. Her mother went to St. Petersburg to ask for the execution to be postponed until the child was born. The interventions of the British ambassador, Francis Napier, also came to nothing.

On June 27, 1863, Zygmunt Sierakowski was hanged in Lukiškės Square in Vilnius. His body was secretly buried on Gediminas' Hill (his remains were found and researched in 2017, and honorably reburied in the Rasos Cemetery Chapel on November 22, 2019). One of the most precious artefacts found alongside his remains was a wedding ring, which was still on his right arm, with an inscription on the inside of the ring "Zygmund Apolonija 11 Sierpnia / 30 Lipca 1862 r."

== Bibliography ==
- Buława, Adam (2021). "Gra na dwa fronty, czyli rozważania o lojalności. Tomasz Łubieński w okresie powstania listopadowego i Zygmunt Sierakowski na drodze do powstania stycznioweg" [A game on two fronts, i.e. considerations about loyalty. Tomasz Łubieński during the November Uprising and Zygmunt Sierakowski on the way to the January Uprising]. Studia Historica Gedanensia. 12: 253–273. doi:10.4467/23916001HG.21.035.15095. S2CID 245324843.
- Kieniewicz, Stefan (1997). "Zygmunt Sierakowski". Polski Słownik Biograficzny (in Polish). Vol. 37. Wrocław. p. 318. Archived from the original on 2023-01-21.
- Łaniec, Stanisław (2001). Ksiądz Antoni Mackiewicz w latach manifestacji, konspiracji i powstania (1861-1863) [Father Antoni Mackiewicz during the demonstrations, conspiracy and uprising (1861-1863)] (in Polish). Olsztyn.
