= Institute for Nobles in Vilnius =

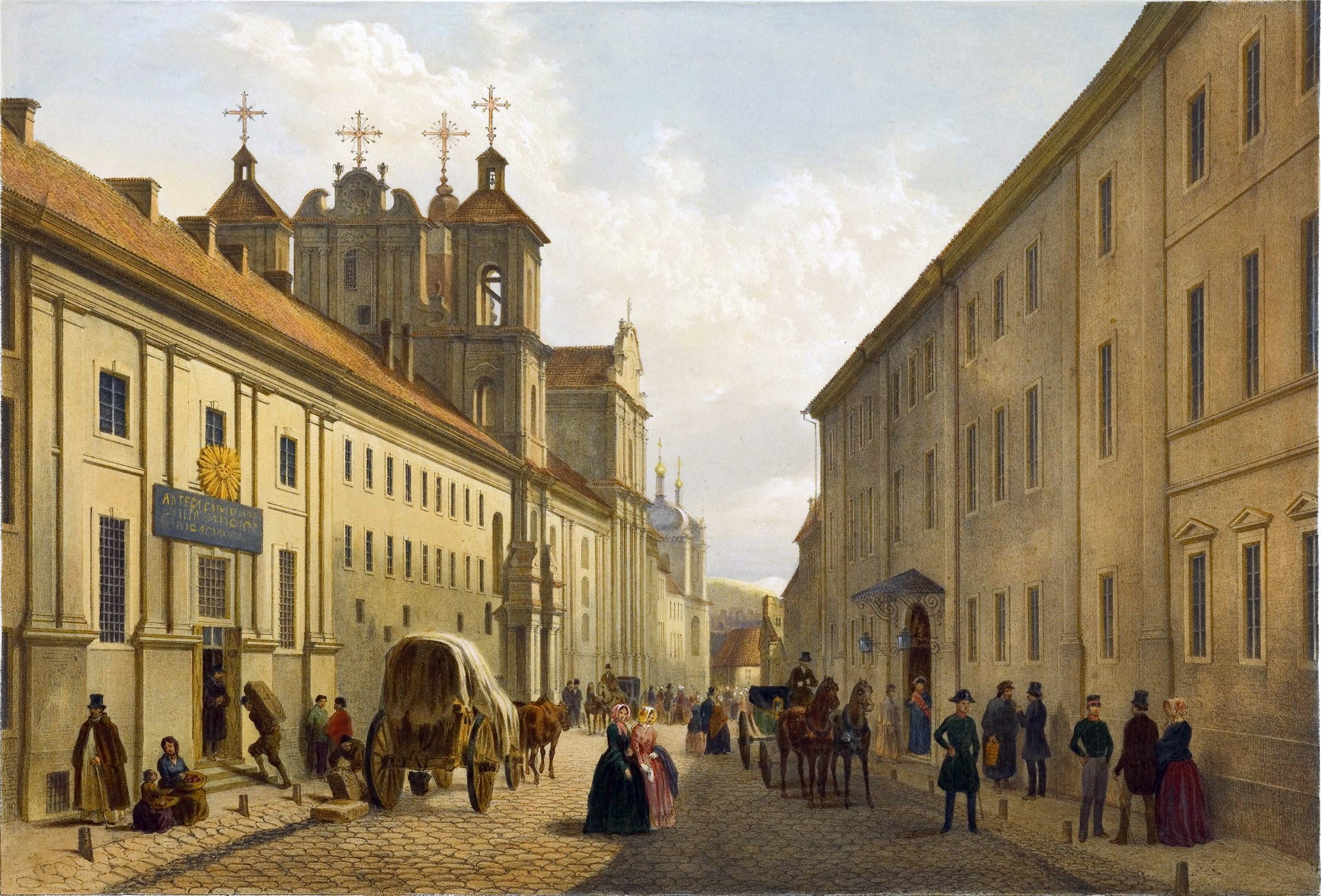
Dominican Street in Vilnius with a view of the Institute for Noble Youth, chromolithograph from Vilnius Album by Jan Kazimierz Wilczyński, 1850. The Institute building is located on the left side of the street.

The Institute for Nobles in Vilnius (Russian: Виленский дворянский институт) was a Russian educational institution intended for the sons of nobles and officials, established to shape a new, loyal elite of the state in the Northwestern Krai. The Institute was founded in 1834 as the Vilnius Noble Boarding School, attached to the 2nd Gymnasium established in 1829. In 1838, both institutions were finally merged and transformed into the Institute for Nobles in Vilnius. The Institute's seat was located in the buildings of the former Piarist monastery on Dominican Street, opposite the Church of the Holy Spirit. In this form, the Institute existed until 1863, when it was closed amid the wave of repressions following the January Uprising.

Contrary to the authorities' plans, the Institute did not fully fulfil its role of Russification. Due to a lack of staff, the school often employed Polish teachers with patriotic inclinations, and the students themselves engaged in patriotic activities. Many of them took part in the January Uprising.

== History ==
=== Beginnings ===
Nicholas I, from the very beginning of his reign, set out to reform the empire's education system by introducing a more unified structure. One element of this reform was the 1826 decree establishing boarding schools for the children of nobles and officials at government gymnasiums in the empire's major cities. The goal was to encourage the nobility to send their children to state schools. This was particularly important in the western part of the empire, the former lands of the Polish–Lithuanian Commonwealth, where the Polish nobility was generally hostile toward the Russian state, especially in the period following the November Uprising. In 1833, Emperor Nicholas I issued an order to establish such boarding schools in Vilnius, Grodno, and Białystok.

In Vilnius, the boarding school was established alongside the 2nd Gymnasium, which had opened in 1829 and was created from the outset with the aim of serving the noble elite. The gymnasium and the boarding school occupied the buildings of the former Piarist monastery on Dominican Street, opposite the Dominican Church of the Holy Spirit. The first director was Vasily Kislov, formerly the director of schools in Mogilev. After the necessary renovations, the boarding school was officially opened on November 13, 1834.

=== Elevation to institute status ===
Despite the initially small number of applicants, enrolment quickly began to grow, as the Gymnasium proved to be the best educational option for the nobility in a region that, after the closure of Vilnius University, no longer had any institutions of higher learning. Graduates entered the civil service directly at the 14th rank, with a shortened waiting period for subsequent promotions. On October 15, 1838, the gymnasium and the boarding school were merged into an educational institution of higher status, the Vilnius Institute for Nobles. It was the only institution of this kind in the Western Krai and the second, after the one in Warsaw, in the former territories of the Polish-Lithuanian Commonwealth.

With the elevation of its status, the Institute received a number of privileges. Students of the final, seventh class were granted the right to wear a uniform and a sword. After serving six months in the army, graduates were automatically awarded an officer’s rank. Those who chose a career in the civil service, if they had excellent grades in Russian language and literature, received the support of the Minister of Education for entry into ministerial service. Additionally, in 1841, graduates were granted the right to enrol at all universities of the empire, except the one in Dorpat, without entrance examinations. These privileges further strengthened the Institute's popularity among the nobility. The Institute also exercised supervision over girls' boarding schools and educational institutions in Vilnius.

=== Closure ===
The closure of the Institute was connected to the involvement of its students in patriotic actions following the national mourning for the five people killed in Warsaw on February 27, 1861. On March 15, a memorial service was held in Vilnius in their honor. Demonstrations and patriotic gatherings continued for several months, involving gymnasium students. While it was difficult for Institute students to participate, the braver ones still managed to slip out. In November 1861, after a joint prayer, the students sang one stanza of the hymn Boże, coś Polskę. As punishment, several senior students were expelled, and many others were whipped. Additional restrictions were introduced, and students' freedom of movement was limited.

After the outbreak of the January Uprising, the situation only worsened. In August 1863, two teachers, Fabian Kurkowski and Wiktor Dłuski, were arrested for supporting the uprising. In September 1863, the school director sent the governor a list of students who had left the school without permission, most likely to join the uprising. Additionally, the authorities decided that the number of secondary schools, as hotbeds of revolutionary aspirations, should be reduced, while the number of primary schools should be increased. On October 21, 1863, by order of Emperor Alexander II, the Institute was closed. The students were transferred to the Vilnius Gymnasium.

Initially, it was planned to organize a classical gymnasium in the Institute’s buildings. However, it was ultimately occupied by the Mariinsky Institute for Noble Maidens.

== Education ==
=== Course ===
The course of study lasted seven years. Students were attending thirteen subject: religion; grammar, logic, and Russian literature; mathematics and physics; general and Russian geography; general and Russian history; general and Russian statistics; Latin language; German language; French language; Polish language; calligraphy; drafting; and drawing. In addition, students could take lessons in singing, music, dance, horse riding and fencing. There was also an amateur theater group in the Institute, which staged plays in Russian and French. The teaching of languages varied in quality. Apart from Russian, the main emphasis was placed on learning French. English, introduced as an optional subject in 1843, was taught at a very poor level until 1851, when the teacher was changed from Adolf Rozenstein to Finley Chisholm. Students who planned a military career were allowed to drop Latin, and many chose to do so. Polish was initially only barely tolerated; in 1840 it was completely abolished as a separate subject and was not reinstated until 1859.

=== Staff ===
Due to the general lack of qualified Russian teaching staff, the school also employed Poles and foreigners alongside Russians. The first director was Vasily Kislov, who, however, lost his position in 1840 due to the Institute’s financial problems. He was succeeded by Gavriil Galler-Fioni, of German origin, who had to resign in 1852 following a scandal after it was discovered that some students had been consuming wine. The position was temporarily filled by the former inspector, the Pole Andrzej Kalinowski. A rapid improvement in the Institute's situation led to his permanent appointment in 1853, until a suitable Orthodox candidate could be found. This occurred in 1857, when Mathias Padrun took over the position. One of the most outstanding teachers was historian Aleksander Zdanowicz and painter Kanuty Rusiecki.

In addition to the director, teachers, department heads, and governors, the Institute also employed around 30 staff members responsible for ensuring an adequate standard of living for the students. Overall, the conditions at the Institute were high; it occupied two large buildings and accommodated a maximum of 110 students, who had access to spacious dormitories, a recreation hall, baths, a hospital, and a library. The Institute also provided clothing, meals, and entertainment.

=== Students and tuition fees ===
The students of the Institute were divided into three categories: government scholarship holders, private scholarship holders, and those who paid full tuition fees. The tuition fee initially amounted to 200 rubles per year, but it soon began to rise, eventually reaching 300 rubles.

Twenty state-funded scholarships were reserved for students from impoverished noble and official families, primarily Russians and members of the loyal nobility. Among them were also sons of distinguished educators, such as Józef Kalinowski, the son of Andrzej Kalinowski, who served first as inspector and later as director of the Institute. Another important source of funding came from educational endowments established on landed estates. Count Michał Walicki, before his death, founded a fund to support eight noble students at one of the schools formerly subordinate to Vilnius University; this endowment was later transferred to the Institute for Nobles. Similarly, the foundations of Prince Stanisław Bonifacy Jundziłł and Antoni Łappa each supported two scholarship holders. In addition, there were also scholarships for four or five students funded by the editorial office of Kurier Litewski, later Kurier Wileński, as well as for one to three students supported by the Committee of Social Welfare.

The exact number of the Institute’s pupils is unknown. However, considering that on average about 110 boys studied there each year, the total number of pupils would amount to around 3,600. Of these, over 82% were Catholics. Orthodox students, mostly Russians, accounted for a little over 13%. Among the most prominent graduates of the Institute were: Dominik Bociarski, Julian Charmański, Władysław Chlewiński, Konrad Chmielewski, Zygmunt Czechowicz-Lachowicki, Tadeusz Cudnowski, Mikołaj Giedroyć, Witold Giedroyć, Jakub Gieysztor, Michał Jelski, Józef (Rafał) Kalinowski, Jarosław Kossakowski, Albertas Liaskovičius, Wiktor Mańkowski, Adomas Medekša, Antanas Medekša, Stanisław Nielawicki, Cezary Jakub Orwid, Konstanty O’Rourke, Bolesław Oskierka, Kornel Peliszka, Kazimierz Podernia, Wacław Przybylski, Alfred Izydor Romer, Mieczysław Siesicki, Leon Sulistrowski, Bolesław Szczerbicki, and Kazimierz Szetkiewicz.

== Bibliography ==
- Godlewska, Janina (1985). "Wileński Instytut Szlachecki (1834-1863). Pamięci prof. Stanisława Kościałkowskiego". Rozprawy z Dziejów Oświaty. 28.
