= Synagogue of Čekiškė =

Former synagogue in Čekiškė, Lithuania

- Lithuanian: Čekiškės sinagoga
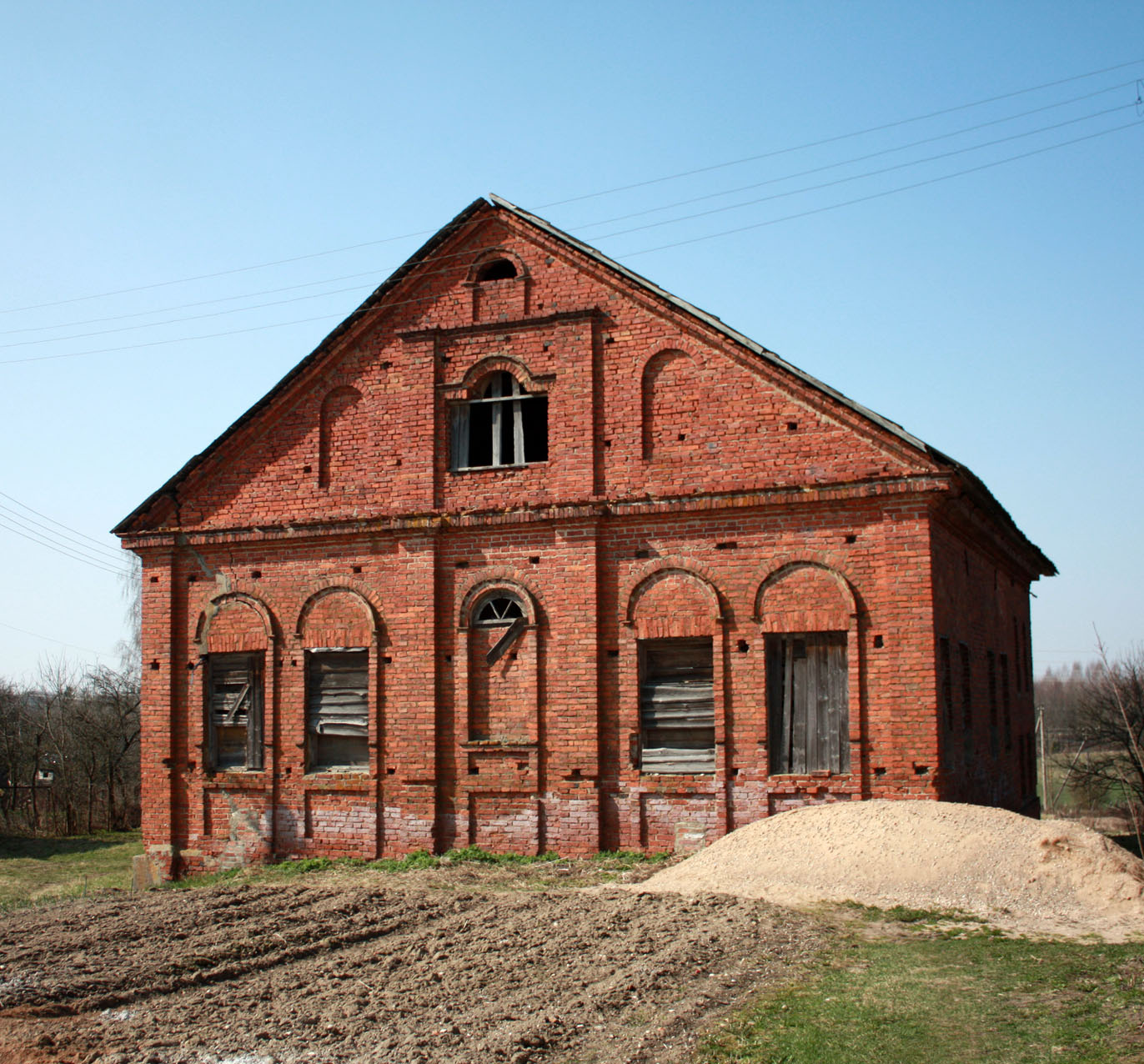
- The former synagogue in 2016

- Location of the former synagogue in Lithuania

Religion
- Affiliation: Judaism (former)
- Rite: Nusach Ashkenaz
- Ecclesiastical or organizational status: Synagogue (1887–1941); Profane use (since 1941)
- Status: Abandoned

Location
- Location: 16 Ateities Street, Čekiškė, Kaunas District Municipality
- Country: Lithuania
- Interactive map of Synagogue of Čekiškė
- Coordinates: 55°09′29″N 23°31′07″E

Architecture
- Type: Synagogue architecture
- Style: Historicist
- Completed: 1887
- Materials: Brick

The Synagogue of Čekiškė (Lithuanian: Čekiškės sinagoga) is a former Jewish congregation and synagogue, located at 16 Ateities Street, in Čekiškė, in the Kaunas District Municipality of Lithuania. Designed in the Historicist style, the building was completed in 1887 and operated as a synagogue until it was devastated by Nazis in 1941. Subsequently used for profane purposes, the building was restored during 2023.

== Structure ==
The synagogue is an unplastered, red brick structure. It has two main volumes, and is covered with a gable roof of asbestos sheets laid on top of old shingles.

The synagogue has a rectangular footprint. It consists of a spacious prayer hall on the eastern side and a two-story western volume, the ground floor of which houses a vestibule and one small room, and the upper floor was the women's section. The main entrance to the synagogue is situated on the southern façade. An outer wooden staircase leading to the women's section was most likely attached to the western façade. Foundations of some later annexes can be traced 9 m (30 ft) westwards from the today's western wall.

The synagogue's exterior has been mostly preserved.

The interior is divided by brick walls into the eastern prayer hall and two western rooms, above which the women's section was situated. The northwestern room apparently served as a small prayer and study room, since there is a niche with a protruding wooden frame in its eastern wall that looks like a small Torah ark.

== History ==
On July 22, 1887, a fire destroyed the majority of the infrastructure of Čekiškė, with only three buildings remaining. The majority of the population at the time were Jewish families. After the fire, the Synagogue of Čekiškė was rebuilt and remained unchanged to this day, although it is no longer in use.

After WWII, the synagogue was abandoned for a long time. During occupation by Soviet Union the building was converted into a kolkhoz granary.

In 2010 the building has been listed as regional monument of cultural heritage.

In 2020, a project to renovate the synagogue was decided by the Jewish community of Kaunas, joined by the Municipality of Kaunas. The restoration of the exterior parts of the synagogue was completed during the summer of 2023.

== See also ==
- History of the Jews in Lithuania
- Lithuanian Jews
