= Aukštdvaris =

- Village
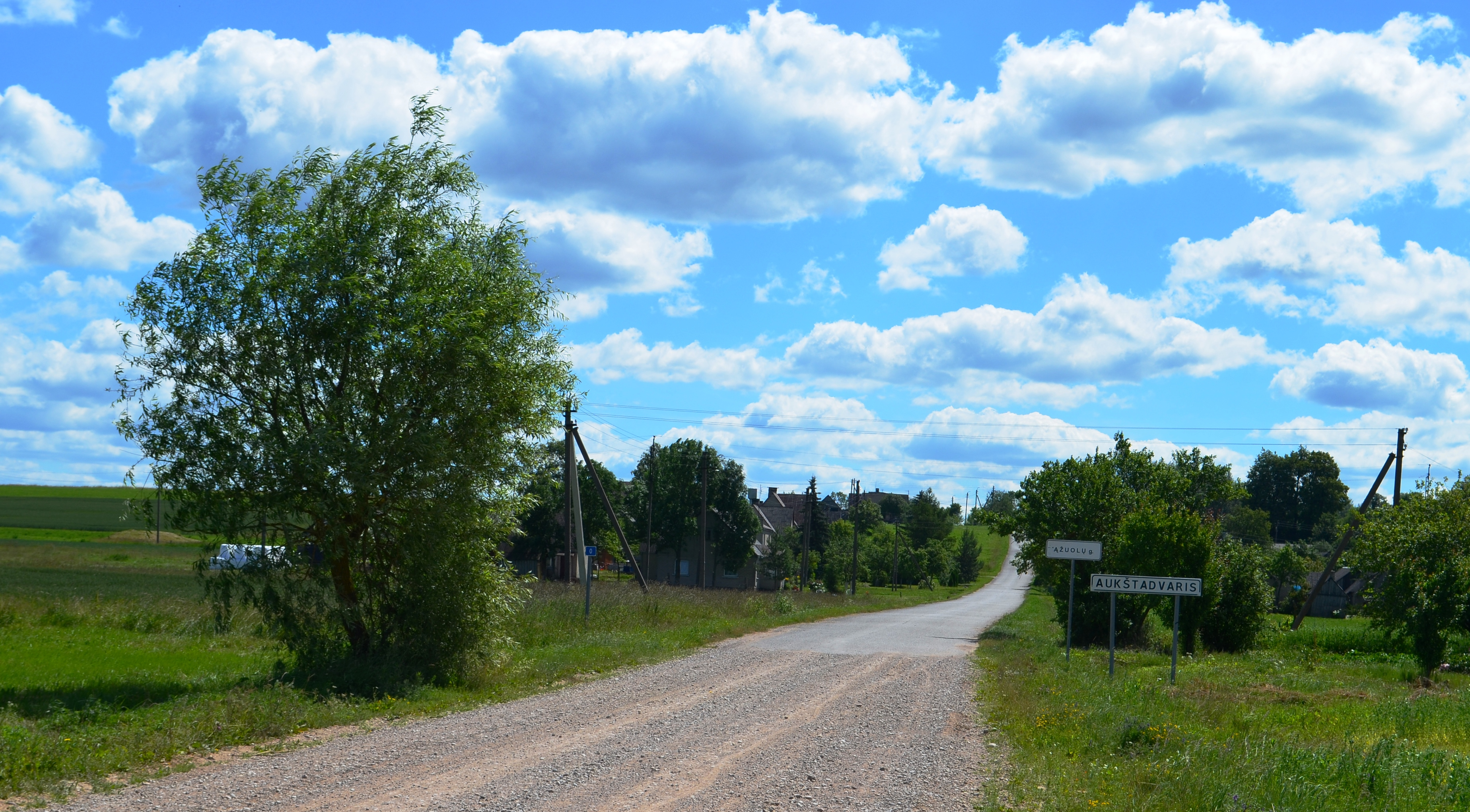

- Location in Lithuania Aukštdvaris (Lithuania)
- Coordinates: 55°09′29″N 23°35′20″E
- Country: Lithuania
- County: Kaunas County
- Municipality: Kėdainiai district municipality
- Eldership: Pernarava Eldership

Population (2011)
  - Total: 126
- Time zone: UTC+2 (EET)
  - Summer (DST): UTC+3 (EEST)

Aukštdvaris ('high manor', formerly Russian: Высокий Двор, Polish: Wysoki Dwór) is a village in Kėdainiai district municipality, in Kaunas County, in central Lithuania. According to the 2011 census, the village had a population of 126 people. It is located 4 kilometres (2.5 mi) from Čekiškė, on the watershed of the Dubysa, Nevėžis and Neman rivers.

== History ==
Bracelets of the 3rd-4th centuries has been found nearby Aukštdvaris. On 17 March, 1863 there was a big battle between the January Uprising insurgents and Tsarist army. There was the Aukštdvaris manor. It belonged to the Jelenski family, then since 1805 to the Belozior, and then to the Podbereski. In 1877 a wheel and cart making factory was opened in the manor.

During the Soviet era it was a subsidiary settlement of the "Oak" kolkhoz.

== Demography ==
Historical population

Year	Pop.	±% p.a.
1923	182	—
1959	196	+0.21%
1970	182	−0.67%
1979	191	+0.54%

Year	Pop.	±% p.a.
1984	148	−4.97%
1989	145	−0.41%
2001	158	+0.72%
2011	126	−2.24%

Source: 1902, 1923, 1959 & 1970, 1979, 1989, 2001, 2011

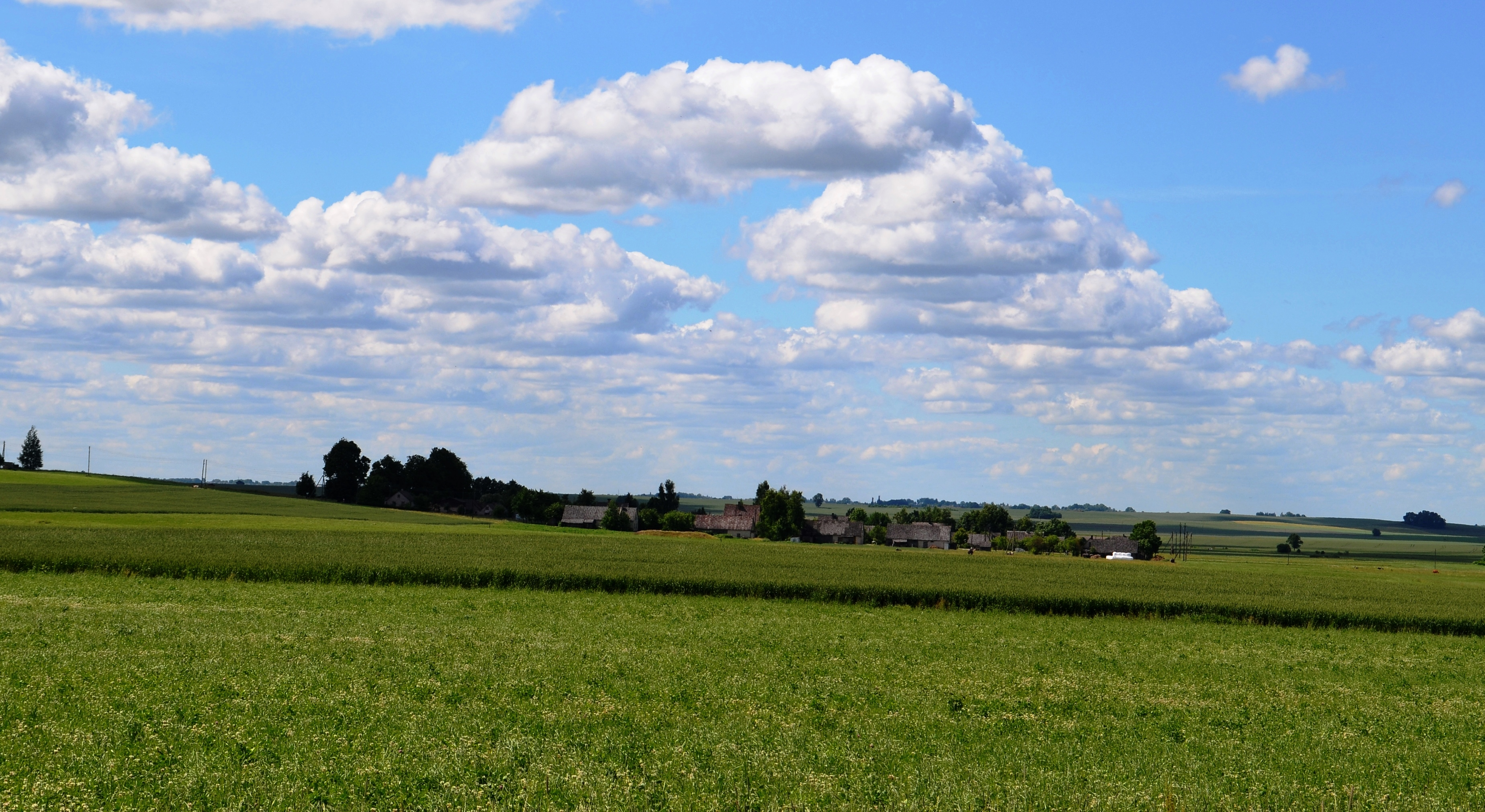
Aukštdvaris view from Langakiai side
