= Jakób Gieysztor =

Polish-Lithuanian nobleman and politician

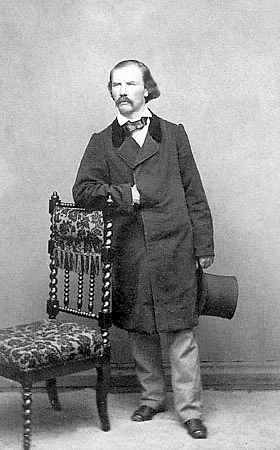
- Born: 18 April 1827
- Died: 15 November 1897 (aged 70)
- Occupation: Memoirist, publicist
- Subject: January Uprising
- Notable works: Pamiętniki Jakóba Gieysztora z lat 1857-1865

Jakób Gieysztor (Lithuanian: Jokūbas Geištoras; 18 April 1827 – 15 November 1897) was a Polish-Lithuanian nobleman and politician who participated in the January Uprising of 1863. Gieysztor was also an antiquarian, publicist, and one of the leaders of the Whites political group in Lithuania. He has published his memoirs of his participation in the uprising and the subsequent deportation to Siberia.

== Ancestry ==
Jakób Gieysztor in his own memoirs notes that he is a descendant of a not very wealthy, but well-known noble family in Lithuania, and explains that "there was no truly historical figure in the Gieysztor family", although he notes that the family has been mentioned in Lithuania for several hundred years. Gieysztor's father, Stanisław, is mentioned as a president of the land courts and an active member of the Kaunas insurgent committee in the November Uprising of 1831. Gieysztor mentions his grandfather's brother, Dominik, as a member of the Great Sejm, where he "called for the treasury and the army", and later entered into the list of the Warsaw townspeople on 29 April 1791. After that Dominik is mentioned as a member of the Lithuania-based security department during the Kościuszko Uprising of 1794. Gieysztor's paternal grandfather, also named Jakób, is mentioned as a civil-military commissioner in 1794.

Gieysztor's mother's family belonged to the Zadora coat of arms. The family claimed that they are descendants of the Polish knight and nobleman Zawisza Czarny. Gieysztor's maternal grandfather, Ignacy or Peter Zawisza, was a pulkownik during the Kościuszko Uprising that was later deported to Arkhangelsk. In 1812 he was chosen as a courier of the Sejm, and a day before his daughter's (Gieysztors mother Leokadja) wedding, he was arrested and imprisoned first in Saint Petersburg and then in Warsaw. Leokadja was already dead when Ignacy was released in 1829. In 1831 he was again deported to Voronezh, but returned in 1833 and shortly died in Vilnius.

== Biography ==
=== Early life ===
Jakób Wilhelm Kasper Gieysztor was born on 18 April 1827 in the village of Medekšiai in the modern-day Kaunas district. He was the son of Stanisław Gieysztor and Leokadia née Zawisza-Dowgiałło. Gieysztor's mother died when he was two years old, and his brother soon died as well. Gieysztor was subsequently nurtured by his grandmother Ona Gonseckienė. They moved to Benaičiai, where Gieysztor learned to read and write. After the November Uprising, Gieysztor and his father moved to Koncavas, while his grandmother moved to Kaunas. Gieysztor's father died in 1834, so Gieysztor moved to Kaunas to meet his grandmother again, after which a more formal type of education ensued. By the will of his uncle, a year before beginning formal education, Gieysztor moved to Plytninkai to study with some other relatives of his. In 1836 Gieysztor entered a gentry school in Kėdainiai. Gieysztor began developing an interest in book collection at the age of thirteen with the works of Marcin Bielski and Julian Ursyn Niemcewicz.

=== Education ===
In 1839 Gieysztor moved to Vilnius to further his studies in the newly established Vilnius Institute for Nobles. He was an exemplary student and graduated in 1844 with a silver medal and began studying law in Saint Petersburg State University. In 1848, right before the final exam, Gieysztor returned to Lithuania to stop insurrectionist activities of the Lithuanian Youth Fraternity Union. Gieysztor then turned to farming and settled in the estate of the Ignacygrad manor belonging to his late grandfather in the Kėdainiai district, which he inherited. Although Gieysztor did not have a formal agricultural education, he nonetheless managed to save the degraded manor financially. He founded a reading room and was the first to establish a quit-rent tax on the peasants in Kėdainiai. Gieysztor actively supported sobriety organizations in Lithuania, such as the one led by Motiejus Valančius.

Gieysztor married his maternal aunt, Tekla Zawisza-Dowgiałło, in 1851. They had five sons and one daughter: Stanisław Ignacy Stefan, Kazimierz Dominiki Adam, Tadeusz Franciszek Alfons, Jan, Witold, and Leokadia. After death of Tekla in 1876 he married in 1877 Helena Eysmont. They had two sons Ryszard and Adam.

In 1858, in preparation for a peasant reform, he wrote his first journalistic work, entitled A Nobleman's Voice (to His Fellows About Peasants' Freedom and Equality).

=== January Uprising and last years ===
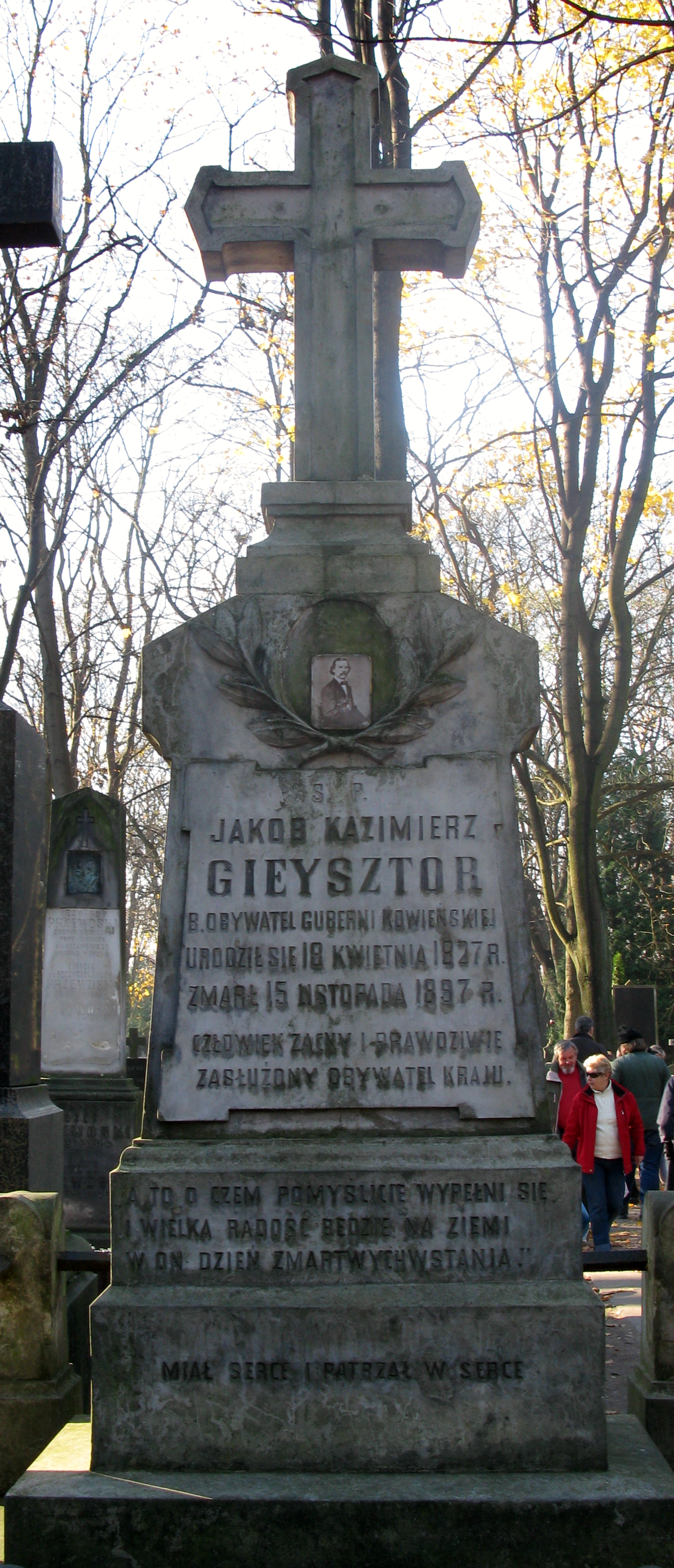
Tomb effigy of Jakób Gieysztor, Powązki Cemetery, Warsaw

In 1861, he formed a civic organization that was close in idea to the White Party. In 1863 Gieysztor became one of the committee members of the Whites. After the outbreak of the January Uprising in 1863, Gieysztor became responsible for managing the provinces of Lithuania. On 31 July 1863 Gieysztor denounced Aleksander Domeyko, the governor's marshal of Vilnius, and was subsequently was arrested. In 1865, he was sentenced to 12 years of hard labor in Usol. After three years he was transferred to Irkutsk, where he traded in footwear. In 1872 he was allowed to return to Poland. He settled in Suwałki with his wife, and then in Warsaw. Upon returning from Siberia, his manor in Ignacygrad was already owned by the descendants of Pyotr Stolypin. In 1877 Gieysztor married Elena Eismantaitė. They had two sons: Ryszard and Adam. From 1880 to 1882 Gieysztor earned a living by editing and writing articles, as well as became the advisor to a land credit society. In 1882 he opened an antiquarian bookshop, made up from his old collections.

Gieysztor wrote a collection of his memoirs, which are now an insightful source into the events of his time. It was to be composed of six parts, each one covering a part of his life. The fourth part is considered the most important, as it covers the uprising, land reforms, inner politics as well as Gieysztor's arrest.

Gieysztor died on 15 November 1897. He was buried at the Powązki Cemetery in Warsaw.
