= Vilnius Gymnasiums =

Two former gymnasiums in Vilnius

Vilnius Boys' Gymnasiums (Russian: Виленские мужские гимназии, romanized: Vilenskiye muzhskiye gimnazii) were two secondary education institutions that existed in Vilnius while it was part of the Russian Empire. The 1st Gymnasium was opened in 1803 and closed in 1918. The 1st and 2nd gymnasiums were located on the premises of Vilnius University, abolished after the failed November Uprising of 1830. Vilnius Girls' Gymnasium was established in 1860.

== History ==
=== 1st Gymnasium ===
Number of students at the 1st Gymnasium
Year	Students	Ref
1803	280	
1805	420	
1808	395	
1819	570	
1821	688	
1824	642	
1825	373 + 276	
1828	347 + 406	
1829	419	
1835–1836	375	
1839	463	
1845	880	
1849	678	
1856	370 + 115	
1859	582 + 39	
1880	~600	

On 4 April 1803, Tsar Alexander I of Russia signed a decree which transformed the preparatory school attached to the Chief School of the Duchy of Lithuania (i.e. Vilnius University) into a gymnasium. It remained attached to and run by the university. Initially, the education lasted six years.

The gymnasium had deep historical traditions and was closely associated with the university. It shared the premises and library, as well as some faculty. Of nine teachers in 1803, five were Vilnius University alumni, two had studied abroad, and two were priests. Therefore, it acted as a feeder school for the university. Out of 115 professors who taught at the university in 1803–1832, 15 were graduates of the gymnasium.

The secret student societies Philomaths and Filaret Association were discovered when a student of the gymnasium wrote on the blackboard "Long live the Constitution of 3 May 1791!" in May 1823. Tsarist police launched an investigation that spread to schools in Kaunas, Kėdainiai, Panevėžys, Svislach as well as Kražiai College. Many students were expelled or sentenced to katorga.

After the closure of Vilnius University in 1832, the gymnasium inherited some remnants of its collection, including books, numismatic samples, scientific implements. In 1843, after the closure of the university and Catholic monasteries, several old bequests by nobles were consolidated to establish a dormitory that would provide free housing for 65 students. Inspired by the Revolutions of 1848, several students started organizing an uprising against the Tsarist regime. However, the plot was discovered and 191 people were arrested; 74 were current or former gymnasium students. In 1849, the school was prohibited to admit children of tax-paying classes (i.e. non-nobles) without special individual exemptions. At the time, the school had 73 such students, all sons of craftsmen. In 1871, to prevent modern and revolutionary ideas, Minister of Education Dmitry Tolstoy reorganized gymnasiums (including the one in Vilnius) to eight-year schools based on "classical" curriculum which spent as much as 40% of the time on Latin and Greek languages.

In 1803, the 1st Gymnasium had nine teachers and 280 students. The number of students increased to 420 in 1805 and 753 in 1828. In 1826–1827, more than 90% of students were Roman Catholics. The number of students decreased to 375 in 1835–1836, but jumped to 880 in 1845. During the Uprising of 1863, the number of students decreased by 271 or 28% as students were expelled or voluntarily left in support of the uprising. In 1880, about 600 students studied at the 1st Gymnasium, about 80% of which were the children of officials and nobles. About 10% of the children were Jews, while the rest were almost evenly split between Roman Catholics and Eastern Orthodoxs.

The 1st Gymnasium was officially closed on 23 February 1918.

=== 2nd Gymnasium ===
After the failed November Uprising, the university and many other schools were closed. Bucking the trend, the 2nd Boys' Gymnasium was opened in 1834. In October 1838, it was transformed into Vilnius Institute for Nobles (Russian: Виленский дворянский институт, romanized: Vilenskiy dvoryanskiy institut) meant for 100 sons of nobles. The institute was meant as a tool of Russification; its students were encouraged to join the Russian Imperial Army. As such, it did not become popular among the Lithuanian nobles and was closed in 1863.

A new gymnasium in Vilnius was established in 1868 when a realgymnasium was opened. The concept of "real schools" was borrowed from Germany. They provided more practical education (i.e. math and science) than the "classical" gymnasiums, but its graduates could not apply to universities. The realgymnasiums, including the one in Vilnius, were reorganized into realschules in 1872.

The 2nd Gymnasium was reestablished in 1884 after a reorganization of a six-year progymnasium. In the early 20th century, tuition cost 75 Russian rubles at the 2nd Gymnasium.

Both gymnasiums lived side by side, separated by a fence, and had a common house of prayer – Saints Cyril and Methodius Church with icons painted by local academic Ivan Trutnev.

== People of the 1st Gymnasium ==
=== Directors ===
- Pyotr Bessonov, director from 1865, Russian folklorist

=== Notable faculty ===
- Ignatius Karlovich Ablamovich, physicist, professor
- Romuald Kobecki, karaim hachan, professor
- Nestor Kukolnik, playwright

Emeryk Hutten-Czapski, count and numismatist

=== Notable students ===
- Vladimir Beneshevich, graduated in 1893, historian
- César Cui, composer and Engineer-General
- Emeryk Hutten-Czapski, 1846, Count, numismatist
- Jan Czerski, geographer
- Simonas Daukantas, historian
- Felix Dzerzhinsky, Bolshevik revolutionary
- Vasily Kachalov, 1894, theatre actor
- Adam Kirkor, 1838, ethnographer, publisher
- Ignaty Krachkovsky, 1901, academic, arabist
- Yulian Kulakovsky, historian, archaeologist
- Józef Piłsudski, 1885, Chief of State and then First Marshal of Poland
- Pyotr Stolypin, Prime Minister of the Russian Empire
- Eustachy Tyszkiewicz, archaeologist
- Walery Antoni Wróblewski, 1853, revolutionary
- Romuald Zenkevich, 1826, Belarusian ethnographer

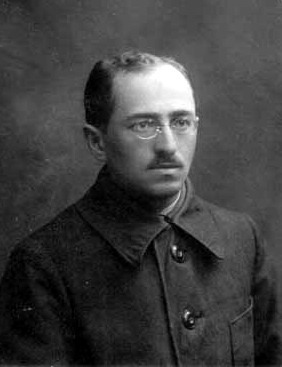
Belarusian linguist Branislaw Tarashkyevich

== People of the 2nd Gymnasium ==
=== Notable faculty ===
- Yefim Karsky, from 1885, linguist and ethnographer

=== Notable students ===
- Mikhail Bakhtin, philosopher
- Mstislav Dobuzhinsky, 1895, painter
- Nikolay Krestinsky, 1901, Bolshevik revolutionary and Soviet politician
- Ivan Solonevich, philosopher, historian, writer
- Branislaw Tarashkyevich, 1911, Belarusian linguist
- Antanas Tumėnas, 1900, Prime Minister of Lithuania

== Citations and references ==
=== Cited sources ===
- Karčiauskienė, M.; Lukšienė, M.; Žukauskas, K.; Gučas, A.; et al. (1983). Lietuvos mokyklos ir pedagoginės minties istorijos bruožai (ligi Didžiosios Spalio socialistinės revoliucijos) (PDF) (in Lithuanian). Vilnius: Mokslas. OCLC 17298949.
- Lukšienė, Meilė (1970). Lietuvos švietimo istorijos bruožai XIX a. pirmojoje pusėje (PDF). Pedagogikos darbai (in Lithuanian). Kaunas: Šviesa. OCLC 8993950.
