= Čekiškė =

- Town
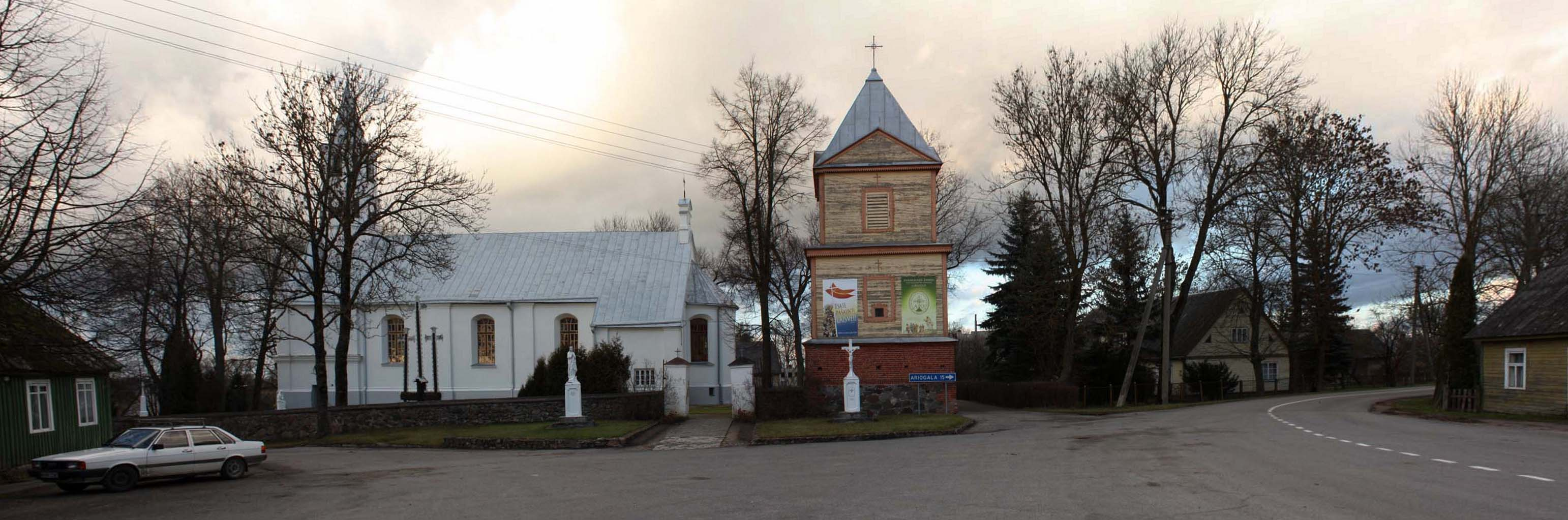
- Town square and church

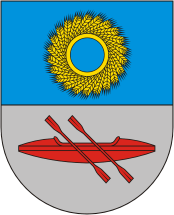
- Coat of arms

- Location in Lithuania
- Coordinates: 55°09′30″N 23°31′30″E
- Country: Lithuania
- Ethnographic region: Aukštaitija
- County: Kaunas County
- Municipality: Kaunas district municipality
- Eldership: Čekiškė eldership
- Capital of: Čekiškė eldership

Population (2021)
  - Total: 559
- Time zone: UTC+2 (EET)
  - Summer (DST): UTC+3 (EEST)

Čekiškė is a small town in Kaunas County in central Lithuania, it is located about 40 kilometres (25 mi) north-west of Kaunas city municipality. In 2011, it had a population of 682. The main town square formed where three roads converged. This dictated a radial plan for the town, which is now protected as a monument of urban architecture.

== History ==
On 22 July 1887 the fire in Čekiškė destroyed majority of the infrastructure with only 3 buildings remaining. Majority of the population at the time were Jewish families. After fire the Synagogue of Čekiškė was rebuilt and remained unchanged to this day, although not in use anymore.
