= Pamiškės =

- Village
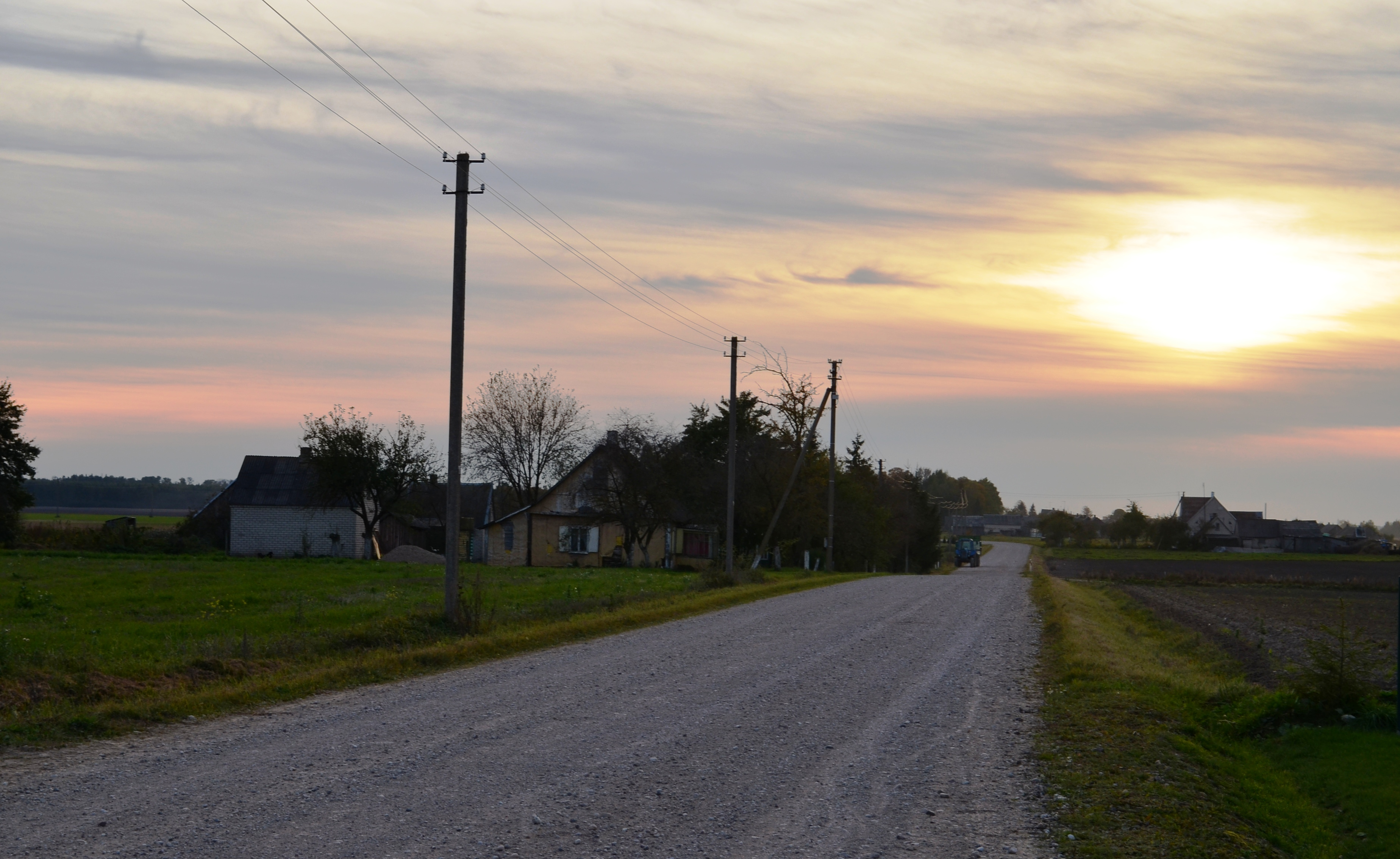

- Location in Lithuania
- Coordinates: 55°29′10″N 23°51′22″E
- Country: Lithuania
- County: Kaunas County
- Municipality: Kėdainiai district municipality
- Eldership: Gudžiūnai Eldership

Population (2011)
  - Total: 14
- Time zone: UTC+2 (EET)
  - Summer (DST): UTC+3 (EEST)

Pamiškės ('forest outskirts') is a village in Kėdainiai district municipality, in Kaunas County, in central Lithuania. According to the 2011 census, the village had a population of 14 people. It is located between Alksnėnai and Miegėnai villages, by the Kruostas and Mamėnas rivers.

== Demography ==
Historical population

| Year | Pop. | ±% p.a. |
|---|---|---|
| 1959 | 74 | — |
| 1970 | 60 | −1.89% |
| 1979 | 33 | −6.43% |

| Year | Pop. | ±% p.a. |
|---|---|---|
| 1989 | 26 | −2.36% |
| 2001 | 28 | +0.62% |
| 2011 | 14 | −6.70% |

Source: 1902, 1923, 1959 & 1970, 1979, 1989, 2001, 2011
