= Gudžiūnai Eldership =

Gudžiūnai Eldership Gudžiūnų seniūnija
- Eldership
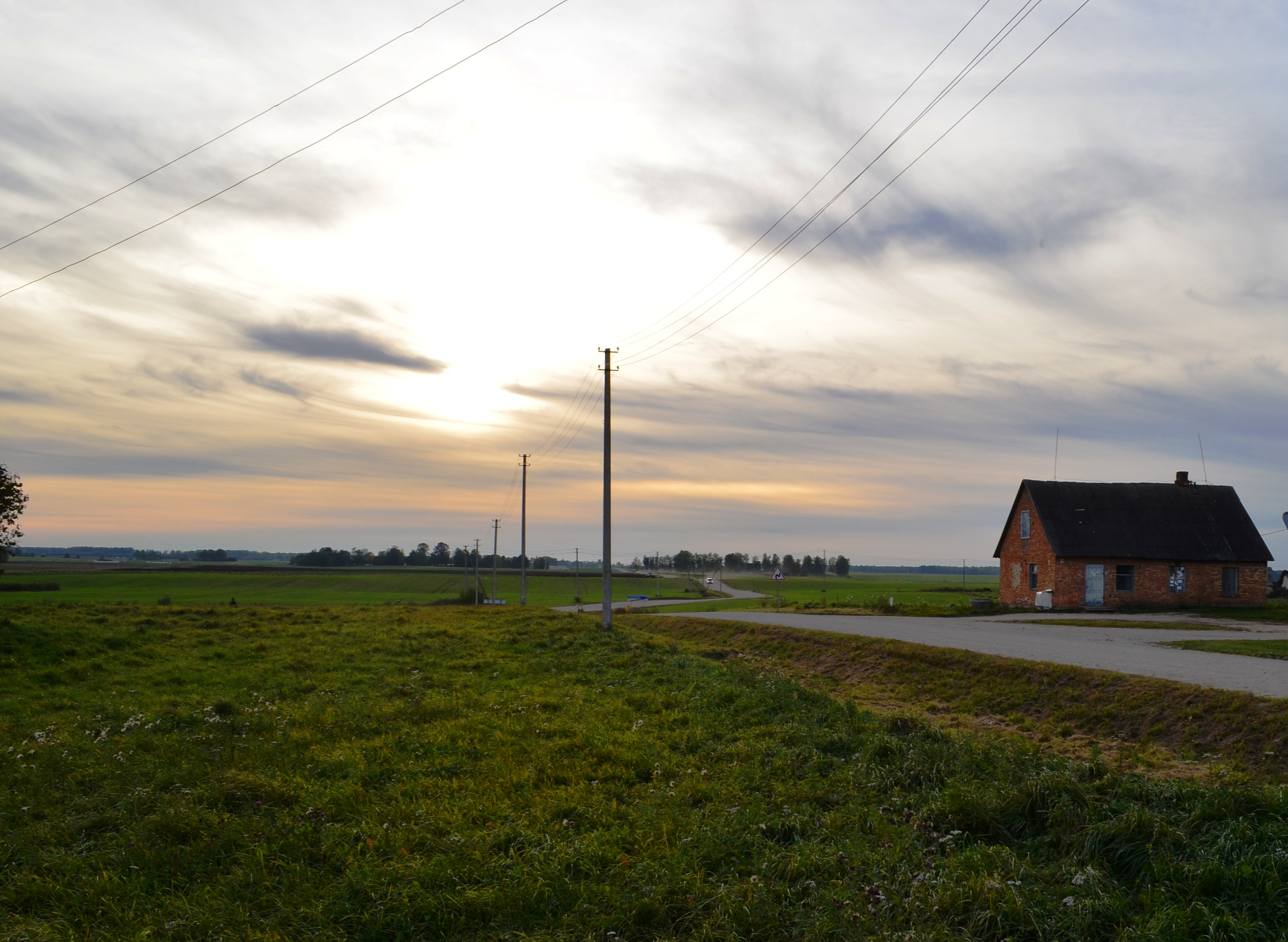
- Landscape near Devynduoniai

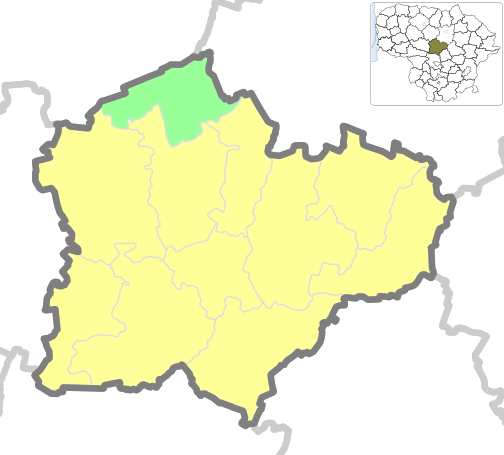
- Location of Gudžiūnai eldership
- Country: Lithuania
- Ethnographic region: Aukštaitija
- County: Kaunas County
- Municipality: Kėdainiai District Municipality
- Administrative centre: Gudžiūnai

Area
  - Total: 93.5 km^{2} (36.1 sq mi)

Population (2011)
  - Total: 1,735
  - Density: 18.6/km^{2} (48.1/sq mi)
- Time zone: UTC+2 (EET)
  - Summer (DST): UTC+3 (EEST)

Gudžiūnai Eldership (Lithuanian: Gudžiūnų seniūnija) is a Lithuanian eldership, located in the northern part of Kėdainiai District Municipality.

Eldership was created from the Gudžiūnai selsovet in 1993.

== Geography ==
All the territory is in the Central Lithuanian plain. There is the highest point (113 m) of the Kėdainiai District Municipality in Gudžiūnai Eldership.

- Rivers: Dotnuvėlė, Liaudė, Nykis;
- Lakes and ponds: Mantviliškis pond;
- Forests: Gudžiūnai forest, Sosiai forest;
- Protected areas: Paberžė landscape sanctuary;
- Nature monuments: Nykis elm tree.

== Populated places ==
Following settlements are located in the Gudžiūnai Eldership (as for 2011 census):

- Towns: Gudžiūnai
- Villages: Alksnėnai · Antanava · Antušava · Balsiai · Danilava · Devynduoniai · Draustiniai · Gasčiūnai · Graužiai · Gudžiūnai · Jaunakaimis · Jokūbaičiai · Margininkai · Marimpolis · Miegėnai · Mlodzinava · Paberžė · Padruskalnys · Pamiškės · Pasiekai · Pilėnai · Senkaimis · Senkoniai · Terespolis · Trakupiai · Tremtiniai · Vikaičiai · Vypalai · Žilvičiai
- Hamlets: Alksnupiai
- Railway settlements: Gudžiūnai GS
