= Senkoniai, Kėdainiai =

Senkoniai
- Village
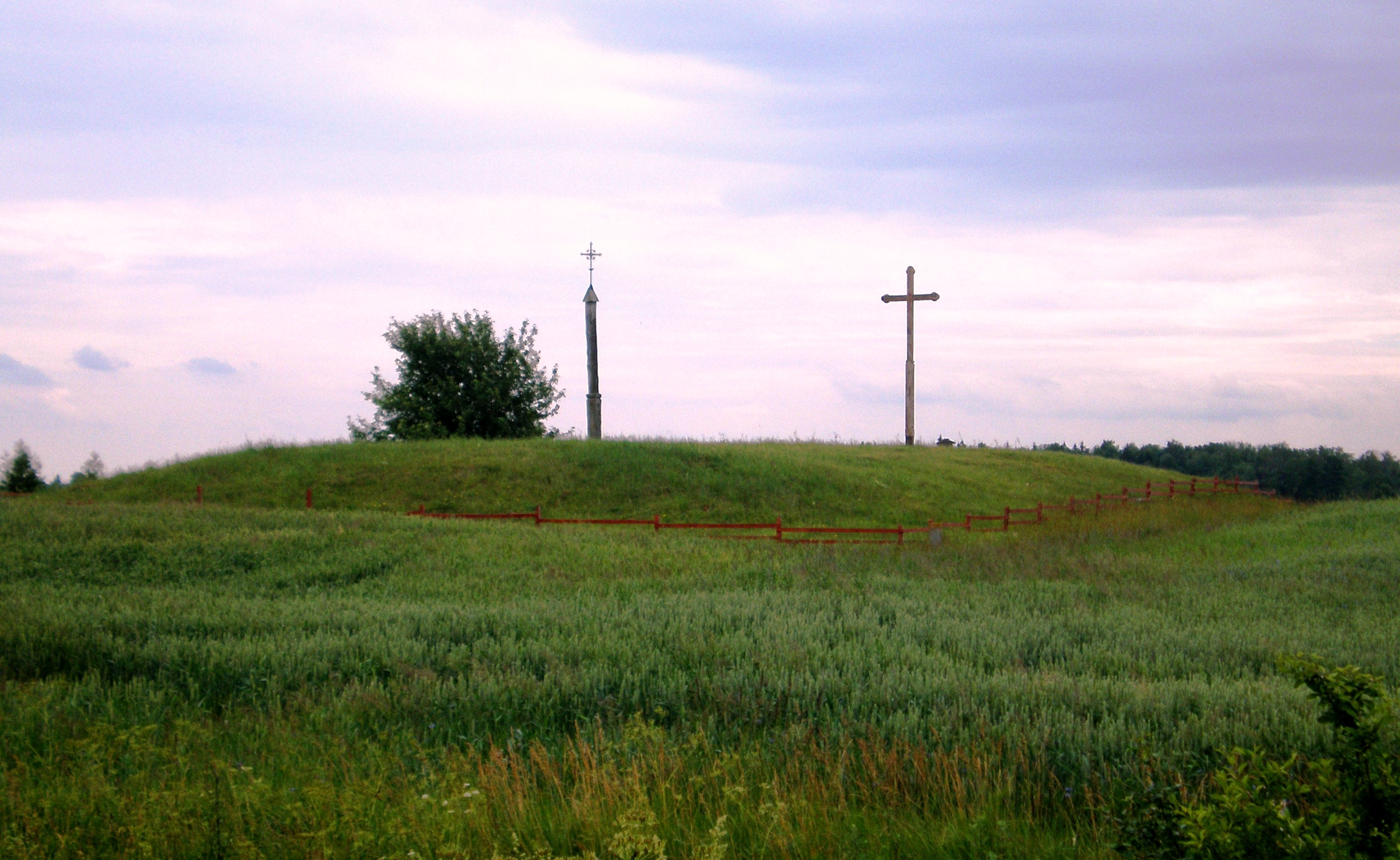

- Location in Lithuania
- Coordinates: 55°30′0″N 23°49′25″E
- Country: Lithuania
- County: Kaunas County
- Municipality: Kėdainiai district municipality
- Eldership: Gudžiūnai Eldership

Population (2011)
  - Total: 0
- Time zone: UTC+2 (EET)
  - Summer (DST): UTC+3 (EEST)

Senkoniai (formerly Russian: Сенкины, Сенканы) is a village in Kėdainiai district municipality, in Kaunas County, in central Lithuania. According to the 2011 census, the village was uninhabited. It is located 2 km from Miegėnai, by the Nykis river. There are old burial ground and the Nykis elm tree (nature monument) in Senkoniai village.

== Demography ==
Historical population

Year	Pop.	±% p.a.
1902	60	—
1959	42	−0.62%
1970	24	−4.96%
1979	5	−15.99%

Year	Pop.	±% p.a.
1989	3	−4.98%
2001	0	−100.00%
2011	0	0.00%

Source: 1902, 1923, 1959 & 1970, 1979, 1989, 2001, 2011

== Images ==
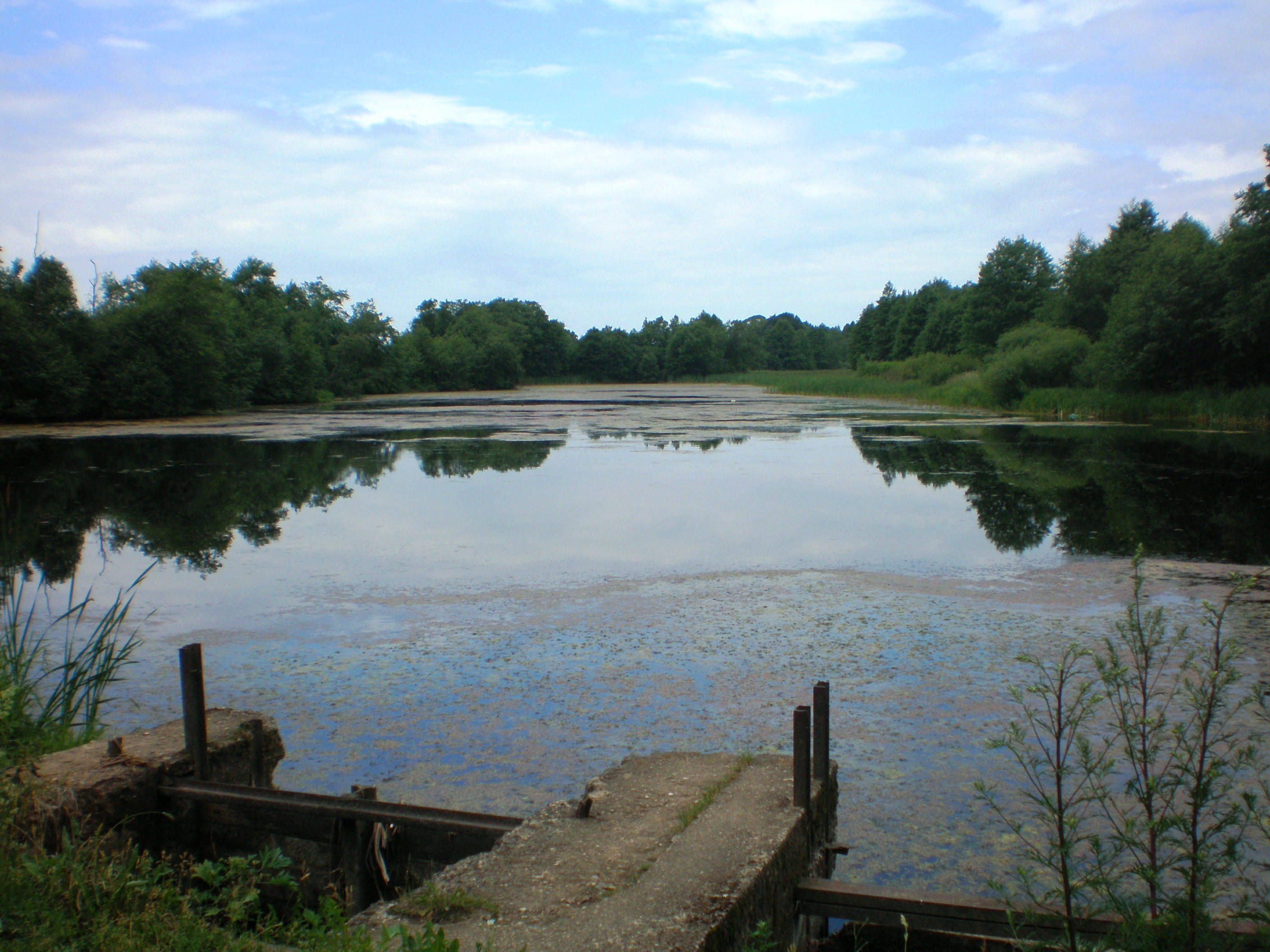
Nykis pond in Senkoniai

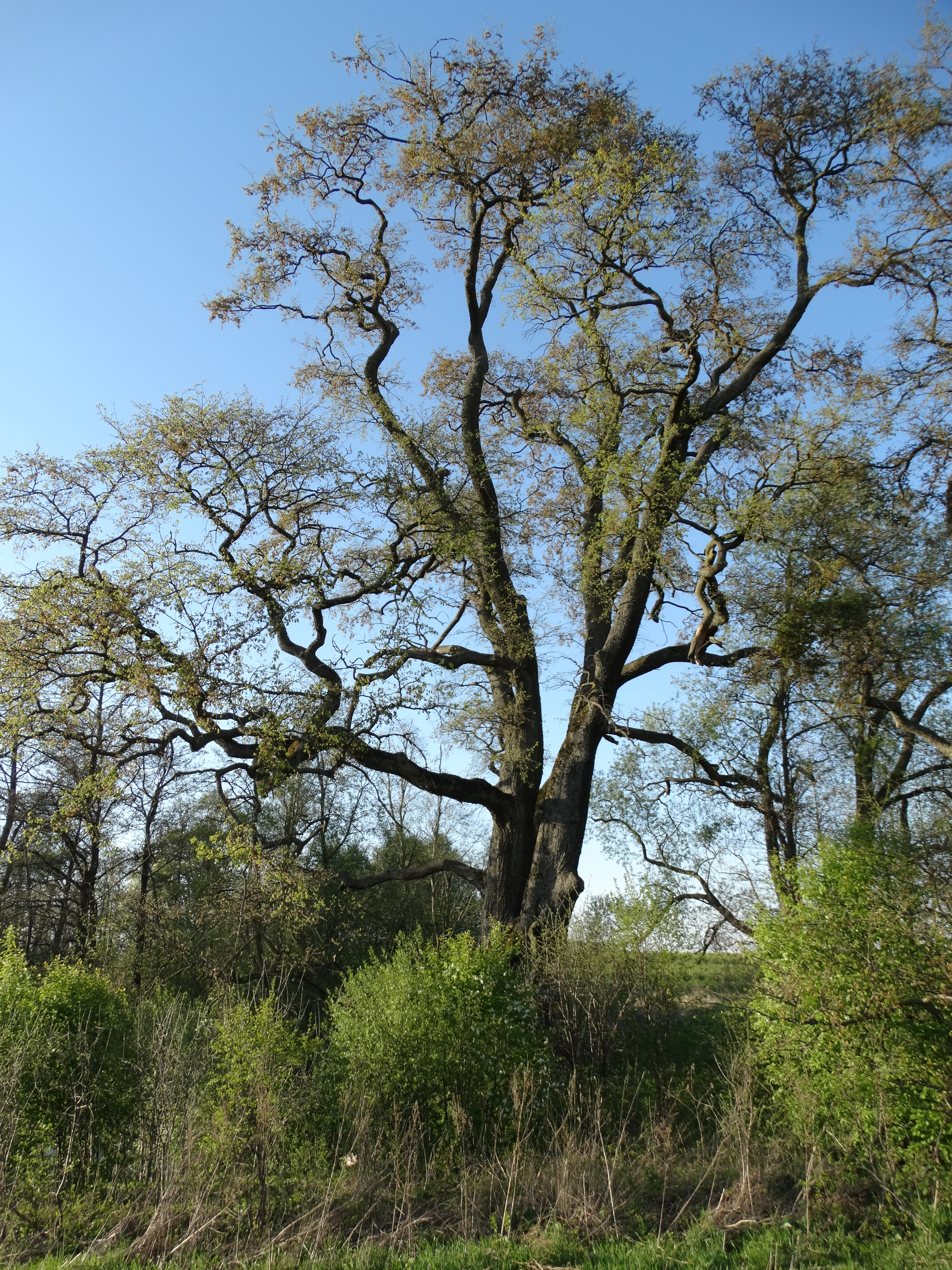
The Nykis elm tree
