= Vypalai =

- Village
- Location in Lithuania
- Coordinates: 55°29′0″N 23°52′0″E
- Country: Lithuania
- County: Kaunas County
- Municipality: Kėdainiai district municipality
- Eldership: Gudžiūnai Eldership

Population (2011)
  - Total: 0
- Time zone: UTC+2 (EET)
  - Summer (DST): UTC+3 (EEST)

Vypalai (formerly Russian: Выпалы, Polish: Wypały) is a village in Kėdainiai district municipality, in Kaunas County, in central Lithuania. According to the 2011 census, the village was uninhabited. It is located 2.5 km from Miegėnai.

There was Wypały estate in Skėmiai volost in the 19th century.

== Demography ==
Historical population

Year	Pop.	±% p.a.
1923	114	—
1959	81	−0.94%
1970	64	−2.12%
1979	0	−100.00%

Year	Pop.	±% p.a.
1989	0	0.00%
2001	0	0.00%
2011	0	0.00%

Source: 1902, 1923, 1959 & 1970, 1979, 1989, 2001, 2011
