= Pilėnai, Kėdainiai =

Pilėnai
- Village
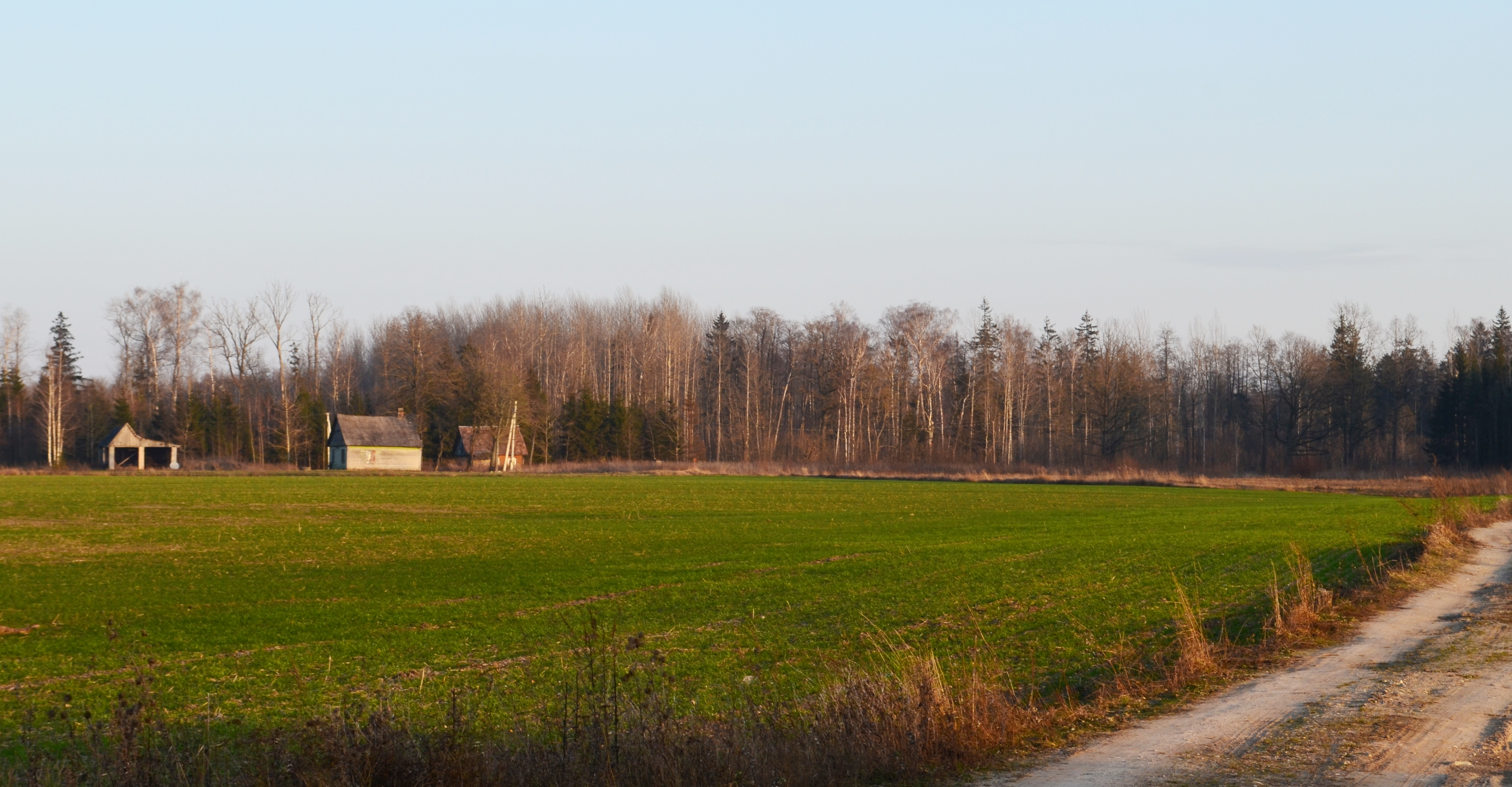

- Location in Lithuania Pilėnai (Lithuania)
- Coordinates: 55°28′30″N 23°49′19″E
- Country: Lithuania
- County: Kaunas County
- Municipality: Kėdainiai district municipality
- Eldership: Gudžiūnai Eldership

Population (2011)
  - Total: 2
- Time zone: UTC+2 (EET)
  - Summer (DST): UTC+3 (EEST)

Pilėnai is a village in Kėdainiai district municipality, in Kaunas County, in central Lithuania. According to the 2011 census, the village had a population of 2 people. It is located 1 km from Alksnėnai, by the Vilnius-Šiauliai railway.

== Demography ==
Historical population

Year	Pop.	±% p.a.
1959	22	—
1970	15	−3.42%
1979	11	−3.39%

Year	Pop.	±% p.a.
1989	6	−5.88%
2001	1	−13.87%
2011	2	+7.18%

Source: 1902, 1923, 1959 & 1970, 1979, 1989, 2001, 2011
