= Tremtiniai, Kėdainiai =

Tremtiniai
- Village
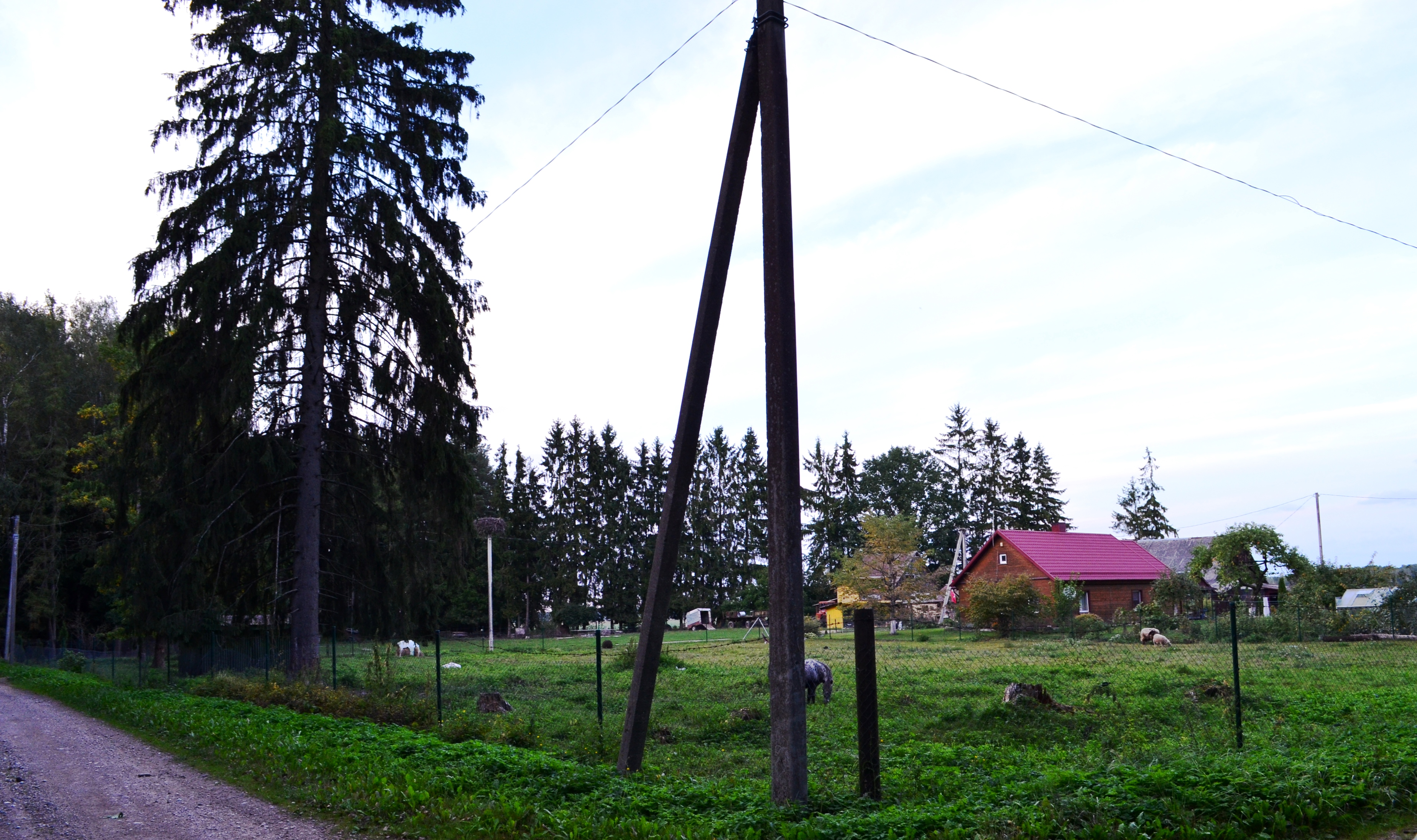

- Location in Lithuania
- Coordinates: 55°30′40″N 23°49′19″E
- Country: Lithuania
- County: Kaunas County
- Municipality: Kėdainiai district municipality
- Eldership: Gudžiūnai Eldership

Population (2011)
  - Total: 5
- Time zone: UTC+2 (EET)
  - Summer (DST): UTC+3 (EEST)

Tremtiniai is a village in Kėdainiai district municipality, in Kaunas County, in central Lithuania. According to the 2011 census, the village had a population of 5 people. It is located 1 km from Vikaičiai, between Serbentynė forest and Vilnius-Šiauliai railway.

== Demography ==
Historical population

Year	Pop.	±% p.a.
1959	55	—
1970	47	−1.42%
1979	7	−19.07%

Year	Pop.	±% p.a.
1989	4	−5.44%
2001	14	+11.00%
2011	5	−9.78%

Source: 1902, 1923, 1959 & 1970, 1979, 1989, 2001, 2011

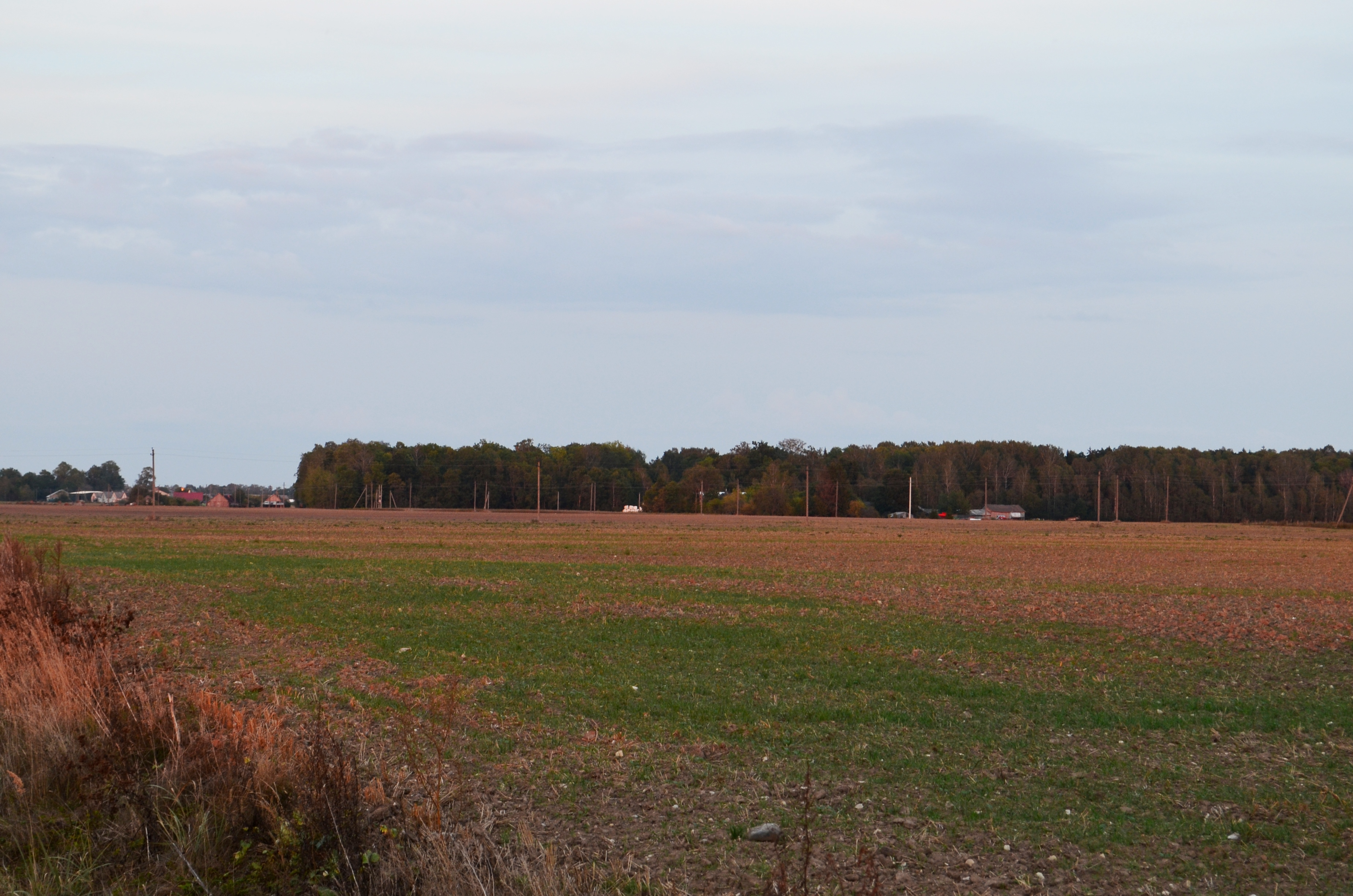
Tremtiniai homesteads nearby Vikaičiai
