= Gasčiūnai, Kėdainiai =

Gasčiūnai
- Village
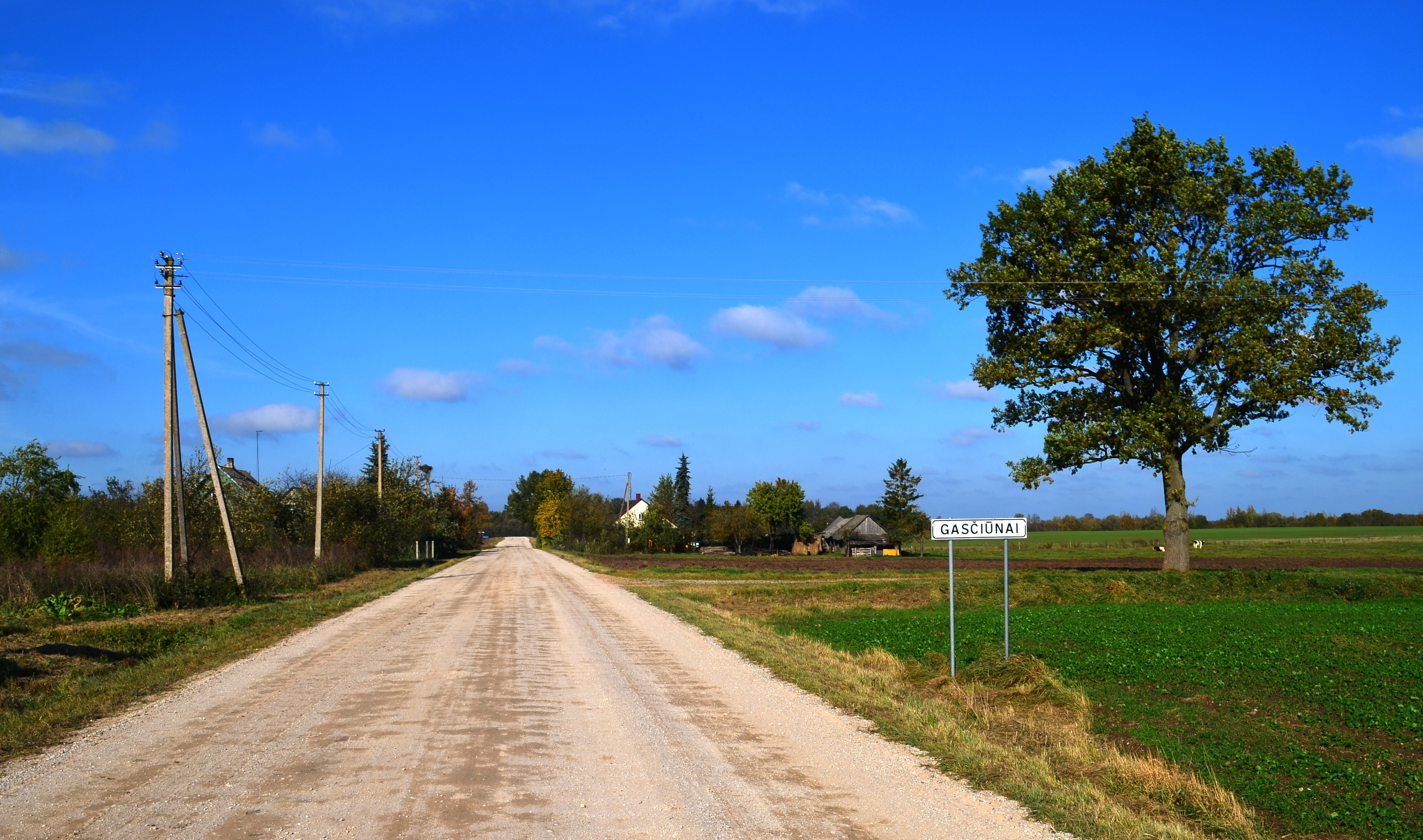

- Location in Lithuania Gasčiūnai (Lithuania)
- Coordinates: 55°33′11″N 23°53′10″E
- Country: Lithuania
- County: Kaunas County
- Municipality: Kėdainiai district municipality
- Eldership: Gudžiūnai Eldership

Population (2011)
  - Total: 10
- Time zone: UTC+2 (EET)
  - Summer (DST): UTC+3 (EEST)

Gasčiūnai (formerly Russian: Гащуны, Гощуны, Polish: Goszczuny) is a village in Kėdainiai district municipality, in Kaunas County, in central Lithuania. According to the 2011 census, the village has a population of 10 people. It is located by the Druskalnis river, 2 km from Devynduoniai.

== Demography ==
Historical population

Year	Pop.	±% p.a.
1902	94	—
1923	144	+2.05%
1959	56	−2.59%
1970	72	+2.31%

Year	Pop.	±% p.a.
1979	32	−8.62%
1989	32	+0.00%
2001	26	−1.72%
2011	10	−9.11%

Source: 1923, 1959 & 1970, 1979, 1989, 2001, 2011
