= Padruskalnys =

- Village
- Location in Lithuania
- Coordinates: 55°33′22″N 23°52′30″E
- Country: Lithuania
- County: Kaunas County
- Municipality: Kėdainiai district municipality
- Eldership: Gudžiūnai Eldership

Population (2011)
  - Total: 10
- Time zone: UTC+2 (EET)
  - Summer (DST): UTC+3 (EEST)

Padruskalnys is a village in Kėdainiai district municipality, in Kaunas County, in central Lithuania. According to the 2011 census, the village had a population of 10 people. It is located by the Druskalnis and Girdelis rivulets, by the limit of Radviliškis district municipality.

== Demography ==
Historical population

Year	Pop.	±% p.a.
1959	74	—
1970	52	−3.16%
1979	26	−7.41%

Year	Pop.	±% p.a.
1989	15	−5.35%
2001	8	−5.10%
2011	10	+2.26%

Source: 1902, 1923, 1959 & 1970, 1979, 1989, 2001, 2011
