= Draustiniai =

- Village
- Location in Lithuania
- Coordinates: 55°29′38″N 23°47′49″E
- Country: Lithuania
- County: Kaunas County
- Municipality: Kėdainiai district municipality
- Eldership: Gudžiūnai Eldership

Population (2011)
  - Total: 0
- Time zone: UTC+2 (EET)
  - Summer (DST): UTC+3 (EEST)

Draustiniai is a village in Kėdainiai district municipality, in Kaunas County, in central Lithuania. According to the 2011 census, the village was uninhabited. It is located between the Dotnuvėlė river and Vilnius-Šiauliai railway.

== Demography ==
Historical population

Year	Pop.	±% p.a.
1959	48	—
1970	34	−3.09%
1979	10	−12.71%

Year	Pop.	±% p.a.
1989	3	−11.34%
2001	0	−100.00%
2011	0	0.00%

Source: 1923, 1959 & 1970, 1979, 1989, 2001, 2011
