= Danilava, Kėdainiai =

Danilava
- Village
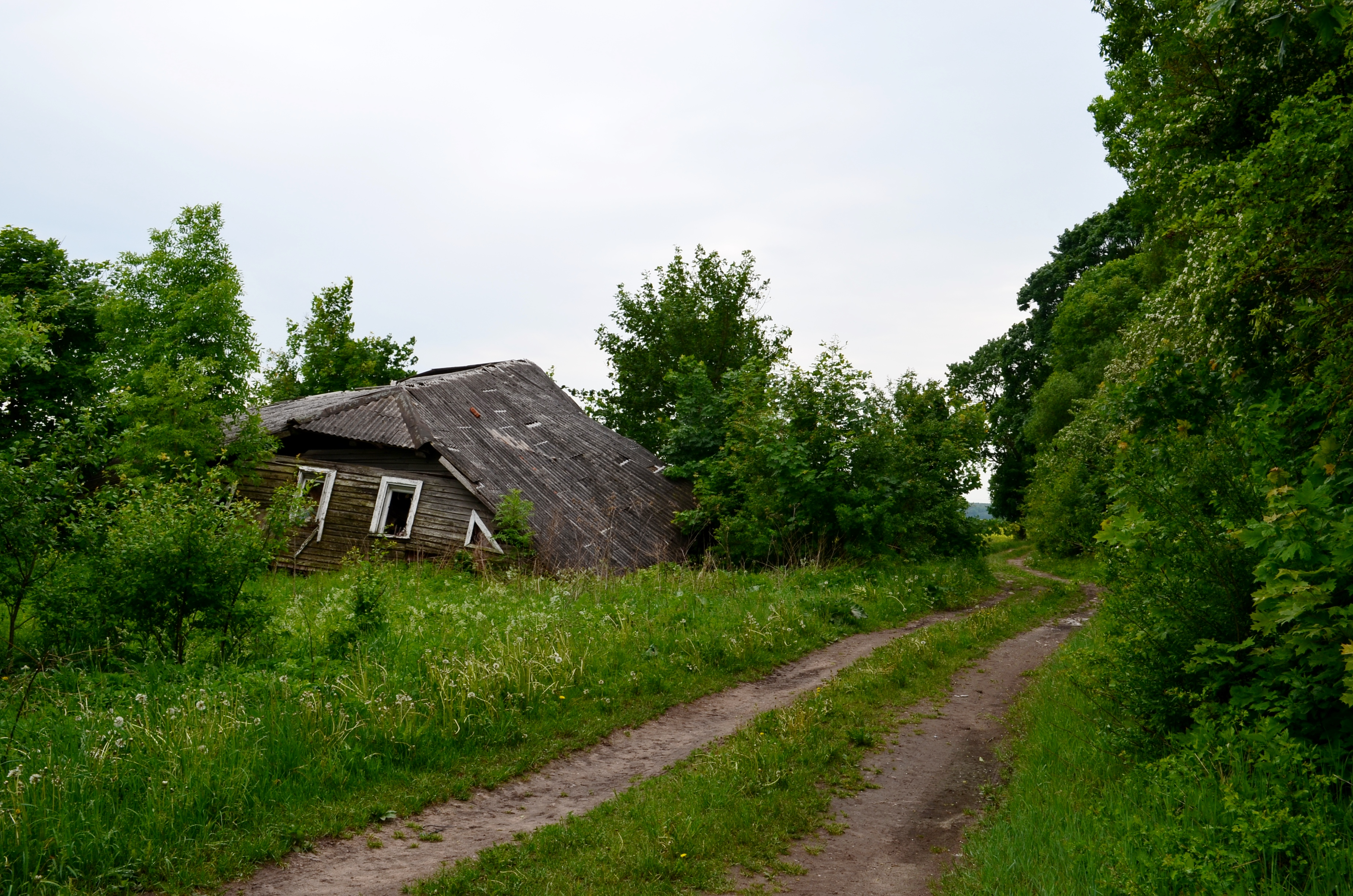

- Location in Lithuania
- Coordinates: 55°30′22″N 23°47′31″E
- Country: Lithuania
- County: Kaunas County
- Municipality: Kėdainiai district municipality
- Eldership: Gudžiūnai Eldership

Population (2011)
  - Total: 9
- Time zone: UTC+2 (EET)
  - Summer (DST): UTC+3 (EEST)

Danilava (formerly Russian: Даниловичи) is a village in Kėdainiai district municipality, in Kaunas County, in central Lithuania. According to the 2011 census, the village has a population of 9 people. It is located 0.5 km (0.31 mi) from Gudžiūnai, by the Jonava-Šeduva road.

== Demography ==
Historical population

Year	Pop.	±% p.a.
1902	38	—
1923	168	+7.33%
1959	29	−4.76%
1970	35	+1.72%

Year	Pop.	±% p.a.
1979	16	−8.33%
1989	3	−15.41%
2001	8	+8.52%
2011	9	+1.18%

Source: 1923, 1959 & 1970, 1979, 1989, 2001, 2011
