= Pasiekai, Kėdainiai =

Pasiekai
- Village
- Location in Lithuania
- Coordinates: 55°30′22″N 23°51′11″E
- Country: Lithuania
- County: Kaunas County
- Municipality: Kėdainiai district municipality
- Eldership: Gudžiūnai Eldership

Population (2011)
  - Total: 0
- Time zone: UTC+2 (EET)
  - Summer (DST): UTC+3 (EEST)

Pasiekai is a village in Kėdainiai district municipality, in Kaunas County, in central Lithuania. According to the 2011 census, the village was uninhabited. It is located in Serbentynė forest.

== Demography ==
Historical population

Year	Pop.	±% p.a.
1923	23	—
1959	8	−2.89%
1970	7	−1.21%
1979	0	−100.00%

Year	Pop.	±% p.a.
1989	0	0.00%
2001	0	0.00%
2011	0	0.00%

Source: 1902, 1923, 1959 & 1970, 1979, 1989, 2001, 2011
