= Mlodzinava =

- Village
- Location in Lithuania
- Coordinates: 55°29′35″N 23°47′17″E
- Country: Lithuania
- County: Kaunas County
- Municipality: Kėdainiai district municipality
- Eldership: Gudžiūnai Eldership

Population (2011)
  - Total: 0
- Time zone: UTC+2 (EET)
  - Summer (DST): UTC+3 (EEST)

Mlodzinava (formerly Russian: Млодзяново, Polish: Młodzianów) is a village in Kėdainiai district municipality, in Kaunas County, in central Lithuania. According to the 2011 census, the village was uninhabited. It is located by the Dotnuvėlė river.

== History ==
At the end of the 19th century it was a folwark of the Grużewski estate.

== Demography ==
Historical population

Year	Pop.	±% p.a.
1902	24	—
1923	91	+6.55%
1959	31	−2.95%
1970	7	−12.65%

Year	Pop.	±% p.a.
1979	0	−100.00%
1989	0	0.00%
2001	0	0.00%
2011	0	0.00%

Source: 1902, 1923, 1959 & 1970, 1979, 1989, 2001, 2011
