= Marimpolis, Kėdainiai =

Marimpolis
- Village
- Location in Lithuania
- Coordinates: 55°32′00″N 23°48′55″E
- Country: Lithuania
- County: Kaunas County
- Municipality: Kėdainiai district municipality
- Eldership: Gudžiūnai Eldership

Population (2011)
  - Total: 0
- Time zone: UTC+2 (EET)
  - Summer (DST): UTC+3 (EEST)

Marimpolis (formerly Russian: Марьямполь, Polish: Maryanpol) is a village in Kėdainiai district municipality, in Kaunas County, in central Lithuania. According to the 2011 census, the village was uninhabited. It is located 7 km from Gudžiūnai.

== Demography ==
Historical population

Year	Pop.	±% p.a.
1902	17	—
1959	24	+0.61%
1970	2	−20.22%
1979	0	−100.00%

Year	Pop.	±% p.a.
1989	0	0.00%
2001	0	0.00%
2011	0	0.00%

Source: 1902, 1923, 1959 & 1970, 1979, 1989, 2001, 2011
