= Antušava =

- Village
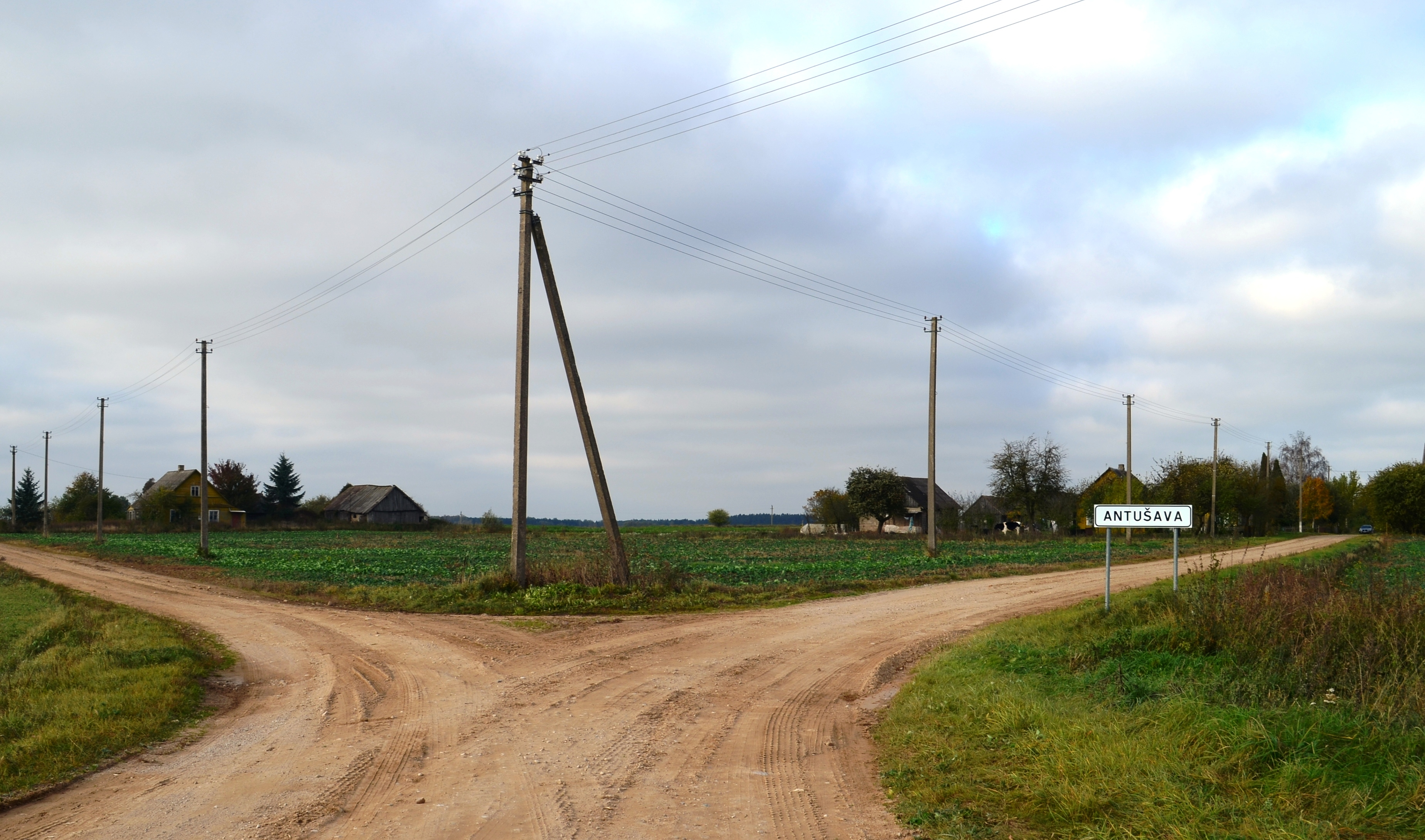

- Location in Lithuania
- Coordinates: 55°29′10″N 23°44′10″E
- Country: Lithuania
- County: Kaunas County
- Municipality: Kėdainiai district municipality
- Eldership: Gudžiūnai Eldership

Population (2011)
  - Total: 16
- Time zone: UTC+2 (EET)
  - Summer (DST): UTC+3 (EEST)

Antušava (formerly Russian: Антошево, Polish: Antoszewo) is a village in Kėdainiai district municipality, in Kaunas County, in central Lithuania. According to the 2011 census, the village has a population of 16 people. It is located 3 km from Gudžiūnai, between Antušava and Skirpstynė forests.

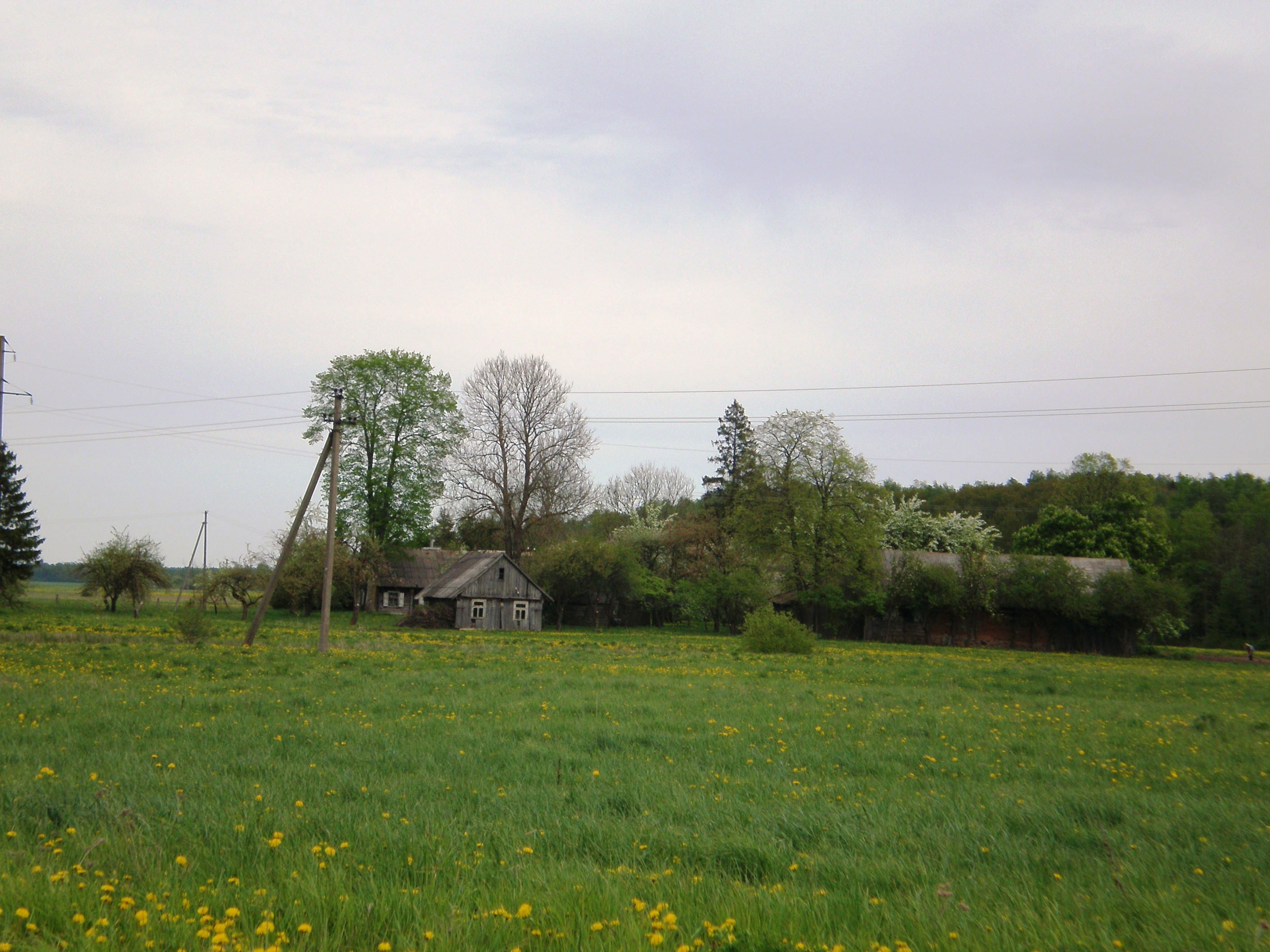
Lonely house of Antušava by the Gudžiūnai-Krakės road

== Demography ==
Historical population

Year	Pop.	±% p.a.
1923	169	—
1959	191	+0.34%
1970	184	−0.34%
1979	100	−6.55%

Year	Pop.	±% p.a.
1989	42	−8.31%
2001	37	−1.05%
2011	16	−8.04%

Source: 1923, 1959 & 1970, 1979, 1989, 2001, 2011
