= Antanava, Gudžiūnai =

Antanava
- Village
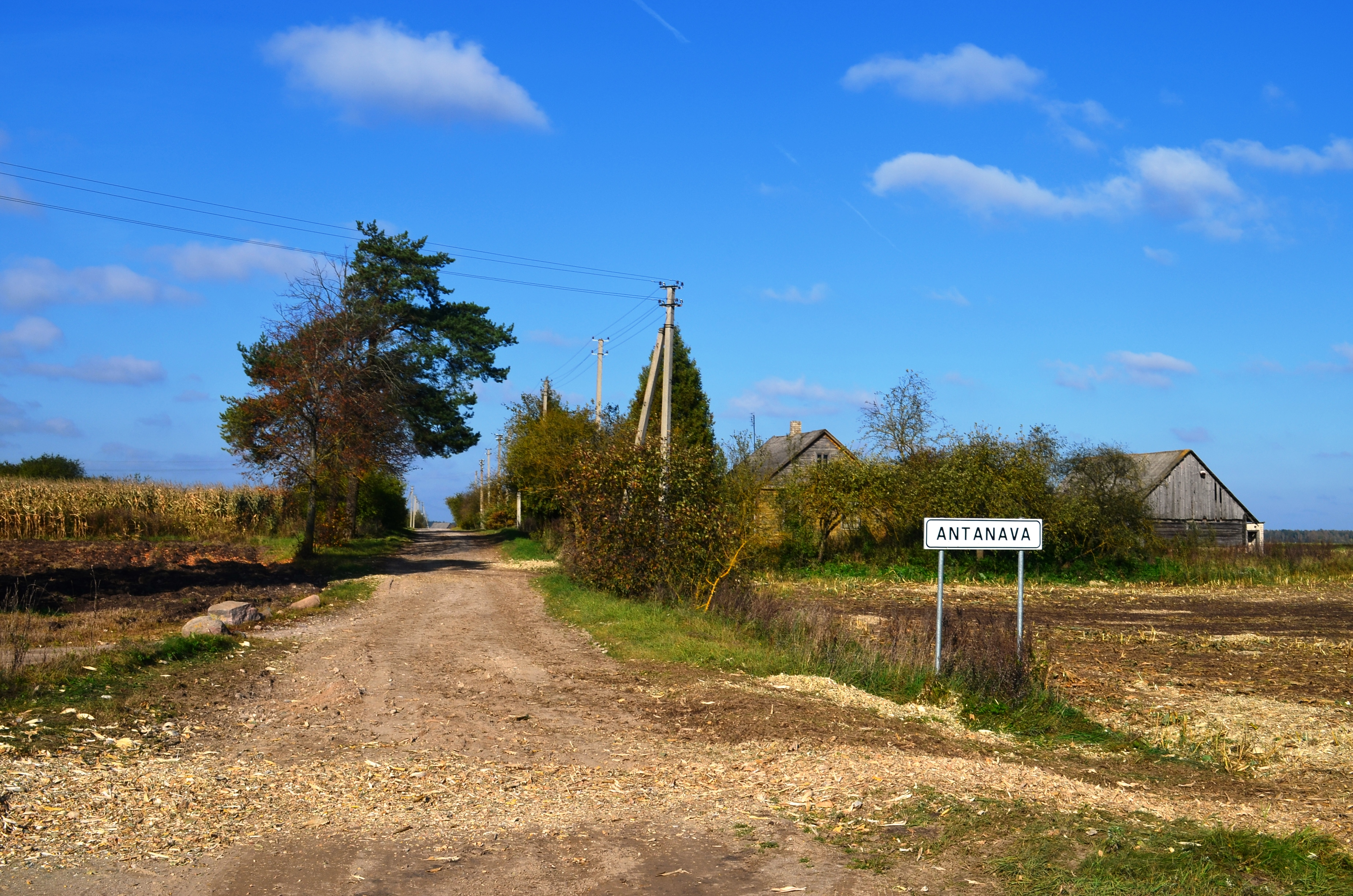

- Location in Lithuania
- Coordinates: 55°28′08″N 23°52′52″E
- Country: Lithuania
- County: Kaunas County
- Municipality: Kėdainiai district municipality
- Eldership: Gudžiūnai Eldership

Population (2011)
  - Total: 27
- Time zone: UTC+2 (EET)
  - Summer (DST): UTC+3 (EEST)

Antanava (formerly Russian: Антоново, Polish: Antonowo) is a village in Kėdainiai district municipality, in Kaunas County, in central Lithuania. According to the 2011 census, the village has a population of 27 people. It is located by the Kruostas river origins and Mamėnas rivulet.

== Demography ==
Historical population

Year	Pop.	±% p.a.
1902	31	—
1959	98	+2.04%
1970	64	−3.80%
1979	54	−1.87%

Year	Pop.	±% p.a.
1989	25	−7.41%
2001	38	+3.55%
2011	27	−3.36%

Source: 1902, 1923, 1959 & 1970, 1979, 1989, 2001, 2011
