= Graužiai, Gudžiūnai =

Graužiai
- Village
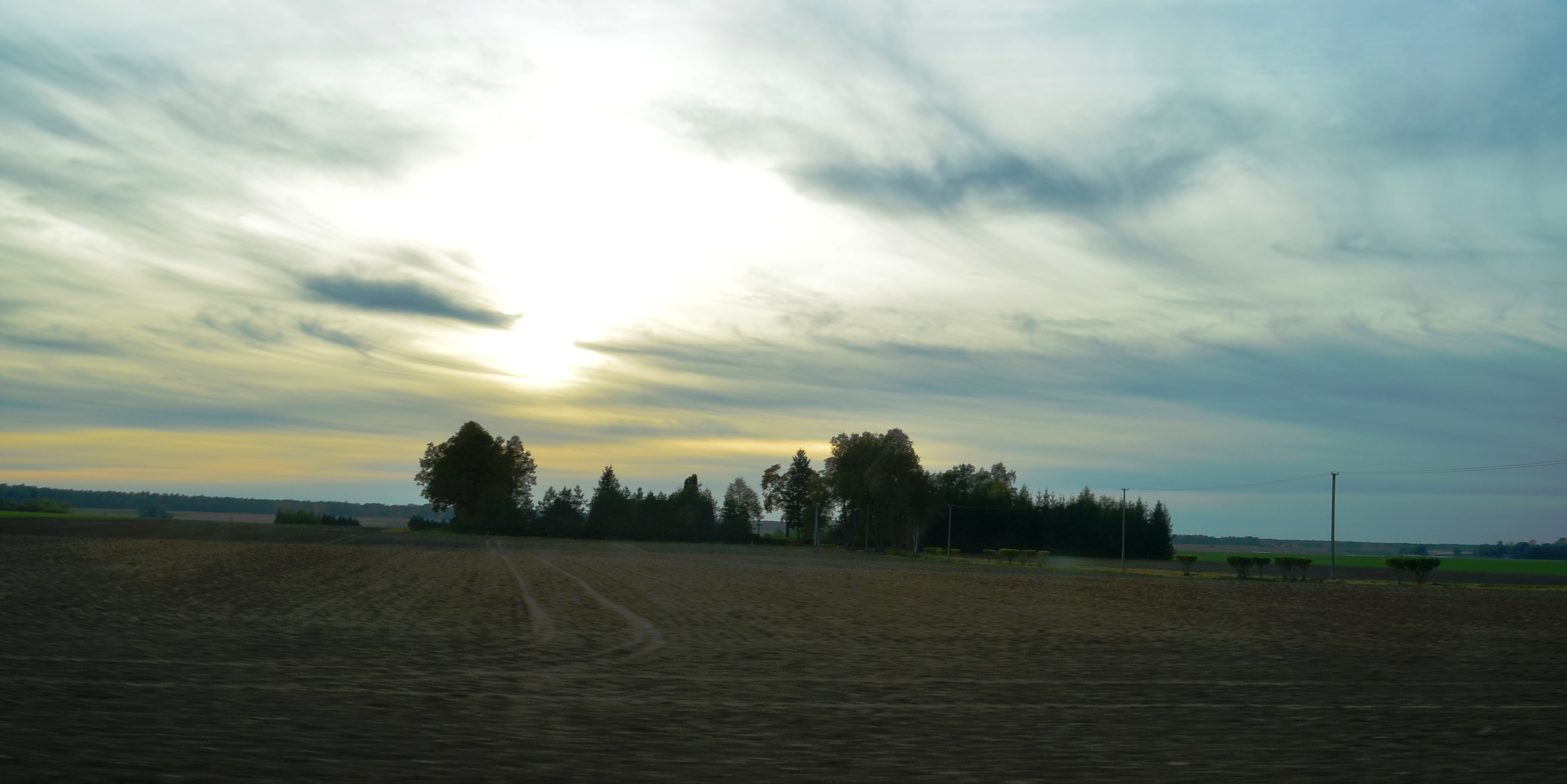

- Location in Lithuania
- Coordinates: 55°30′29″N 23°54′29″E
- Country: Lithuania
- County: Kaunas County
- Municipality: Kėdainiai district municipality
- Eldership: Gudžiūnai Eldership

Population (2011)
  - Total: 3
- Time zone: UTC+2 (EET)
  - Summer (DST): UTC+3 (EEST)

Graužiai (formerly Russian: Грауже, Polish: Grauże) is a village in Kėdainiai district municipality, in Kaunas County, in central Lithuania. According to the 2011 census, the village has a population of 3 people. It is located by the Nykis river.

== Demography ==
Historical population

Year	Pop.	±% p.a.
1902	28	—
1959	9	−1.97%
1970	7	−2.26%
1979	6	−1.70%

Year	Pop.	±% p.a.
1989	11	+6.25%
2001	2	−13.24%
2011	3	+4.14%

Source: 1923, 1959 & 1970, 1979, 1989, 2001, 2011
