= Balsiai, Kėdainiai =

Balsiai
- Village
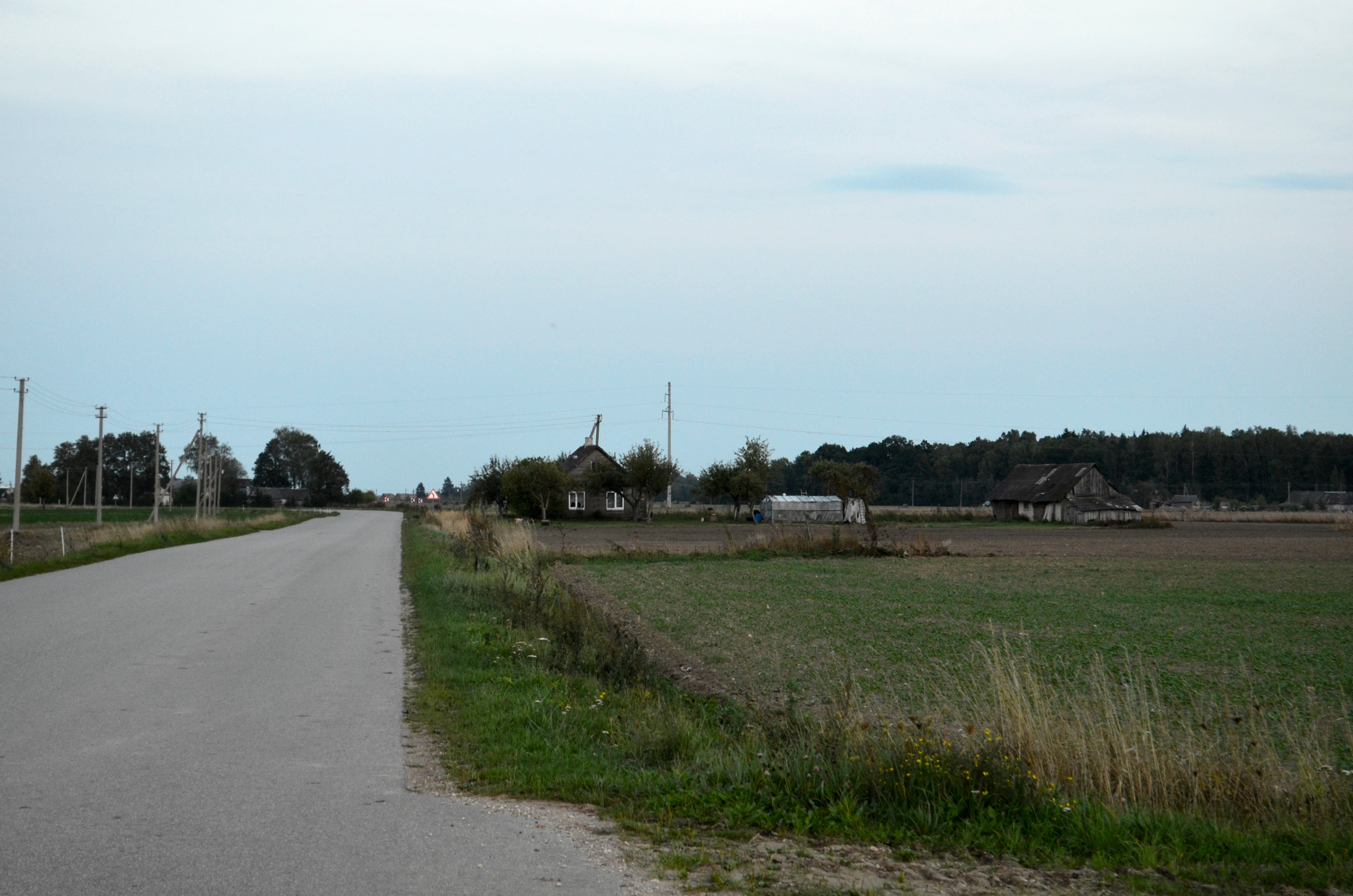

- Location in Lithuania
- Coordinates: 55°31′05″N 23°49′08″E
- Country: Lithuania
- County: Kaunas County
- Municipality: Kėdainiai district municipality
- Eldership: Gudžiūnai Eldership

Population (2011)
  - Total: 1
- Time zone: UTC+2 (EET)
  - Summer (DST): UTC+3 (EEST)

Balsiai is a village in Kėdainiai district municipality, Kaunas County, central Lithuania. According to the 2011 census, only 1 person lives in the village. It is located 3.5 km from Gudžiūnai and is by the Mairiškiai-Gudžiūnai road.

== Demography ==
Historical population

Year	Pop.	±% p.a.
1959	139	—
1970	61	−7.21%
1979	21	−11.17%

Year	Pop.	±% p.a.
1989	4	−15.28%
2001	6	+3.44%
2011	1	−16.40%

Source: 1923, 1959 & 1970, 1979, 1989, 2001, 2011
