= Jokūbaičiai, Kėdainiai =

Jokūbaičiai
- Village
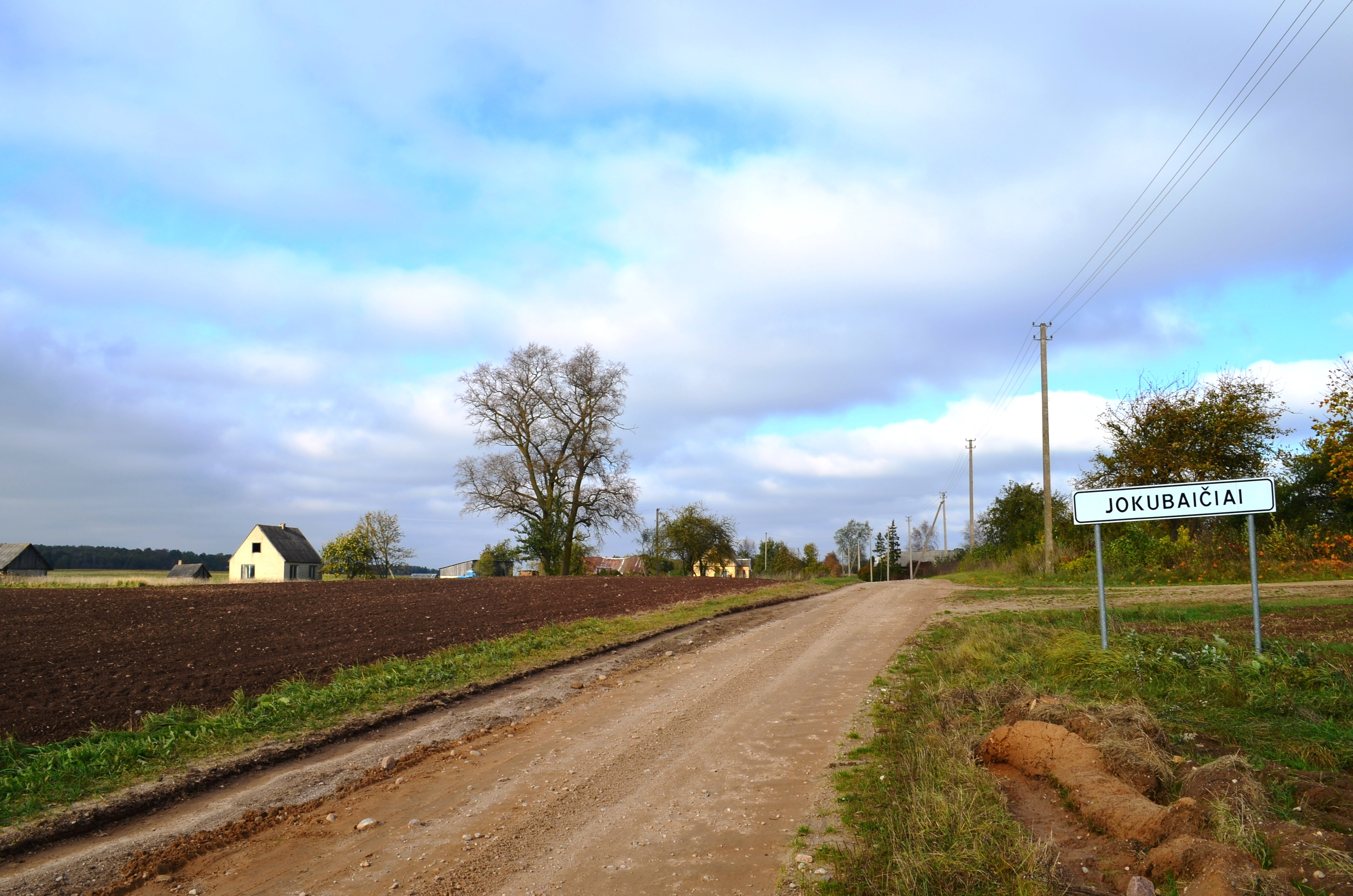

- Location in Lithuania
- Coordinates: 55°29′49″N 23°42′50″E
- Country: Lithuania
- County: Kaunas County
- Municipality: Kėdainiai district municipality
- Eldership: Gudžiūnai Eldership

Population (2011)
  - Total: 20
- Time zone: UTC+2 (EET)
  - Summer (DST): UTC+3 (EEST)

Jokūbaičiai (formerly Russian: Якубайци, Polish: Jakubajcie) is a village in Kėdainiai district municipality, in Kaunas County, in central Lithuania. According to the 2011 census, the village has a population of 20 people. It is located 4 km from Gudžiūnai, by the Srautas river.

== History ==
Jokūbačiai is mentioned as a royal village in the 18th century. During the Second World War Nazis killed 7 inhabitants of Jokūbačiai.

== Demography ==
Historical population

Year	Pop.	±% p.a.
1820	131	—
1902	258	+0.83%
1923	297	+0.67%
1959	238	−0.61%
1970	146	−4.35%

Year	Pop.	±% p.a.
1979	65	−8.60%
1985	43	−6.65%
1989	29	−9.38%
2001	33	+1.08%
2011	20	−4.88%

Source: 1923, 1959 & 1970, 1979, 1989, 2001, 2011
