= Gudžiūnai (village) =

- Village
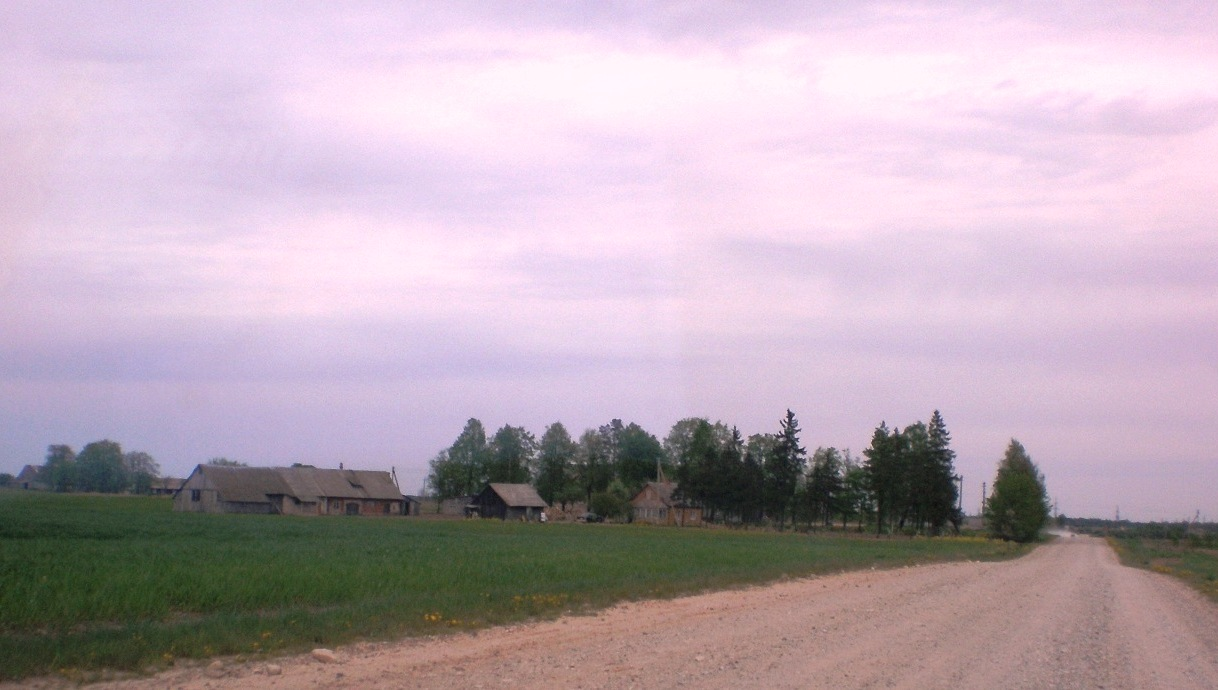

- Location in Lithuania
- Coordinates: 55°29′38″N 23°46′59″E
- Country: Lithuania
- County: Kaunas County
- Municipality: Kėdainiai district municipality
- Eldership: Gudžiūnai Eldership

Population (2011)
  - Total: 61
- Time zone: UTC+2 (EET)
  - Summer (DST): UTC+3 (EEST)

Gudžiūnai is a village in Kėdainiai district municipality, in Kaunas County, in central Lithuania. According to the 2011 census, the village has a population of 61 people. It is located around Gudžiūnai town, between the Dotnuvėlė river and its tributaries Srautas and Krevė.

== Demography ==
Historical population

Year	Pop.	±% p.a.
1959	276	—
1970	285	+0.29%
1989	0	−100.00%

Year	Pop.	±% p.a.
2001	80	—
2011	61	−2.68%

Source: 1923, 1959 & 1970, 1979, 1989, 2001, 2011
