= Terespolis =

- Village
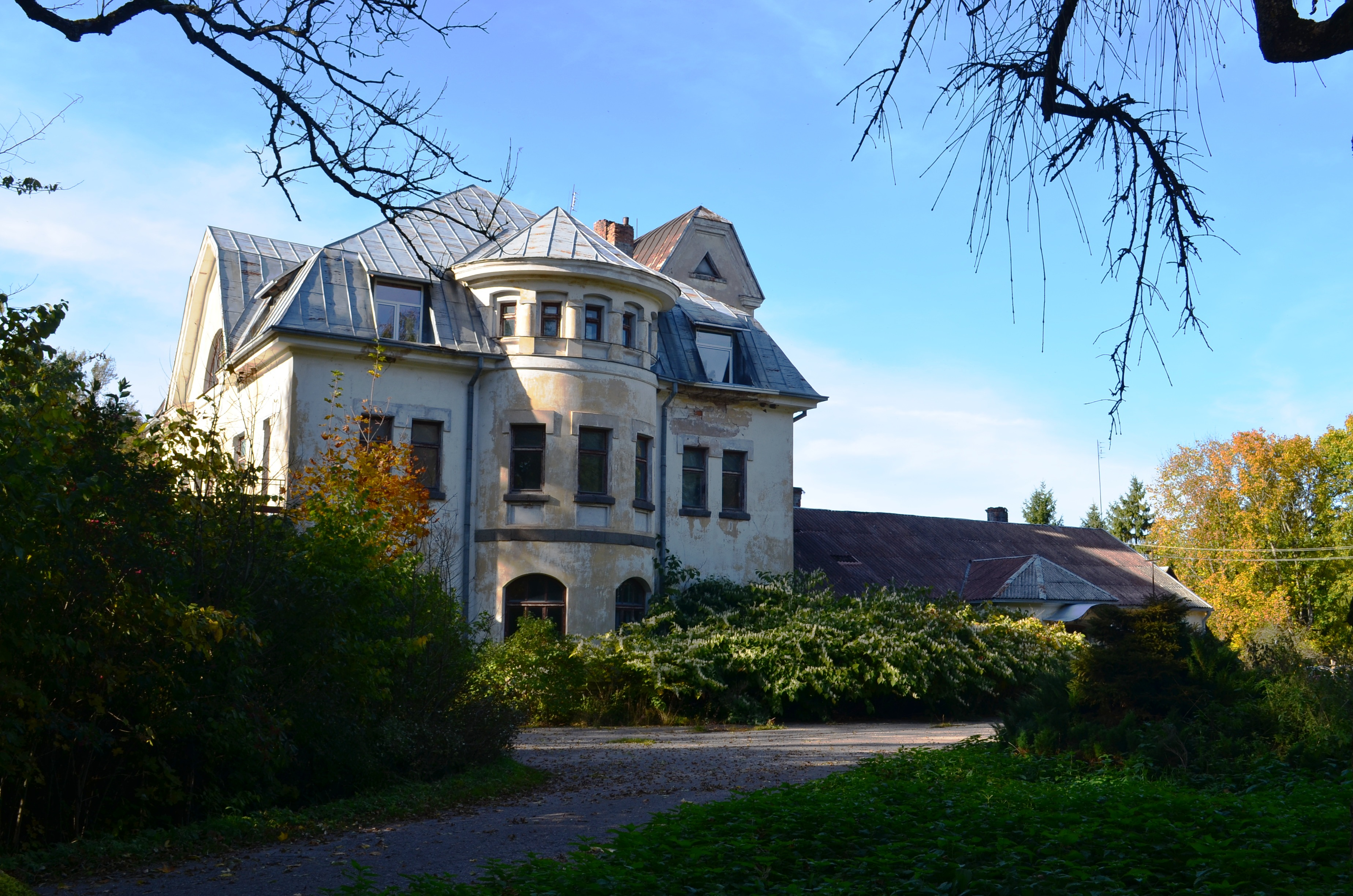

- Location in Lithuania Terespolis (Lithuania)
- Coordinates: 55°31′19″N 23°48′22″E
- Country: Lithuania
- County: Kaunas County
- Municipality: Kėdainiai district municipality
- Eldership: Gudžiūnai Eldership

Population (2011)
  - Total: 30
- Time zone: UTC+2 (EET)
  - Summer (DST): UTC+3 (EEST)

Terespolis (formerly Russian: Тересполь, Polish: Terespol) is a village in Kėdainiai district municipality, in Kaunas County, in central Lithuania. According to the 2011 census, the village had a population of 30 people. It is located 3 km from Gudžiūnai, by the Mairiškiai-Gudžiūnai road.

There is a former manor (build at the end of the 19th century) and a park (area 6 ha) with ponds, alleys and an orchard.

At the end of the 19th century and the beginning of the 20th century Terespol was an estate of nobleman Chrapowycki. In the 1926 the estate was parceled and new villages were established in its place.

== Demography ==
Historical population

Year	Pop.	±% p.a.
1902	40	—
1923	166	+7.01%
1959	96	−1.51%
1970	96	+0.00%

Year	Pop.	±% p.a.
1979	82	−1.74%
1989	73	−1.16%
2001	65	−0.96%
2011	30	−7.44%

Source: 1902, 1923, 1959 & 1970, 1979, 1989, 2001, 2011

== Images ==
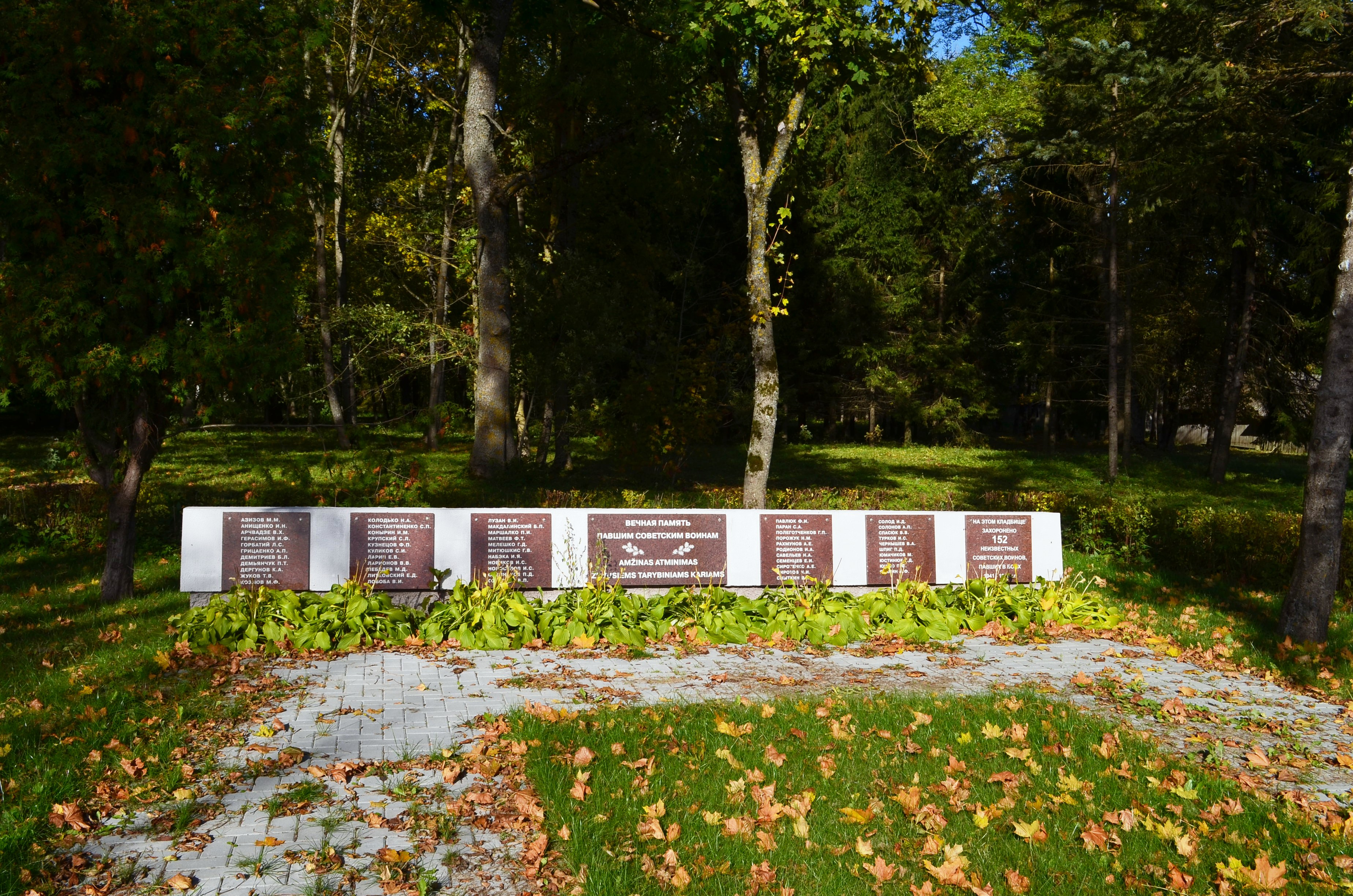
Monument to Soviet soldiers

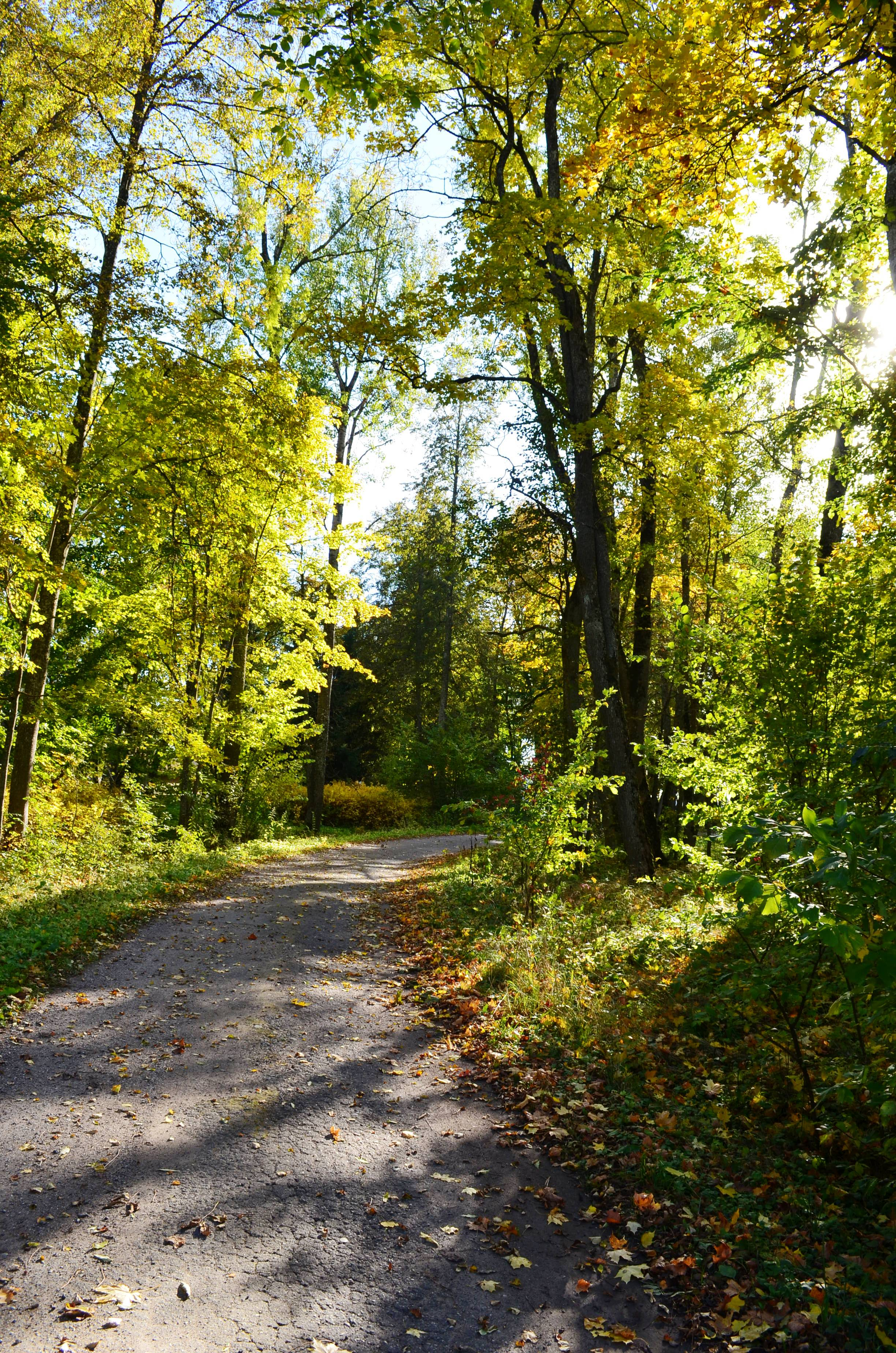
Terespolis park
