= Nykis =

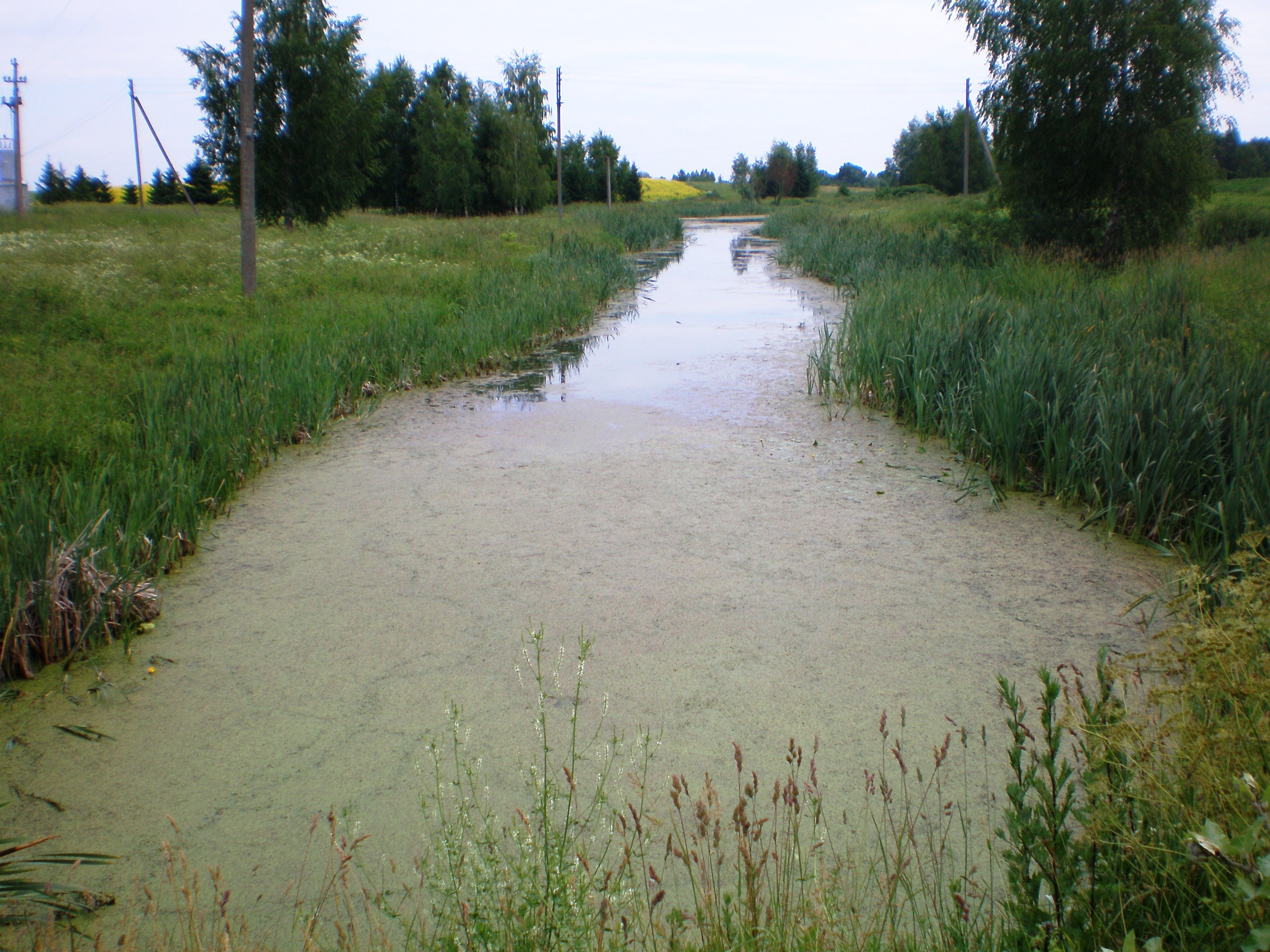
- Nykis in Miegėnai

Location
- Country: Lithuania
- Region: Kėdainiai district municipality, Kaunas County

Physical characteristics
- Source
  - location: Balsiai forest near Terespolis
- Mouth: Liaudė
  - coordinates: 55.5028°N 23.9634°E
- Length: c. 12 kilometres (7.5 mi)

Basin features
- Progression: Liaudė→ Nevėžis→ Neman→ Baltic Sea

The Nykis is a river of Kėdainiai district municipality, Kaunas County, central Lithuania. It is a right tributary of the Liaudė. It originates in Balsiai forest and flows east, meeting the Liaudė in Paberžė village.

There are 3 ponds on the Nykis. Along its course, the river passes Vikaičiai, Margininkai, Graužiai, Miegėnai, Paberžė villages.

The hydronym Nykis possibly derives from the Lithuanian verb nykti ('to disappear, to decay') although it was collated with Latvian: nica ('a downstream place'), Sanskrit: nīca ('short, low'), Old Slavic ниць ('prostrate') also.
