= Devynduoniai =

- Village
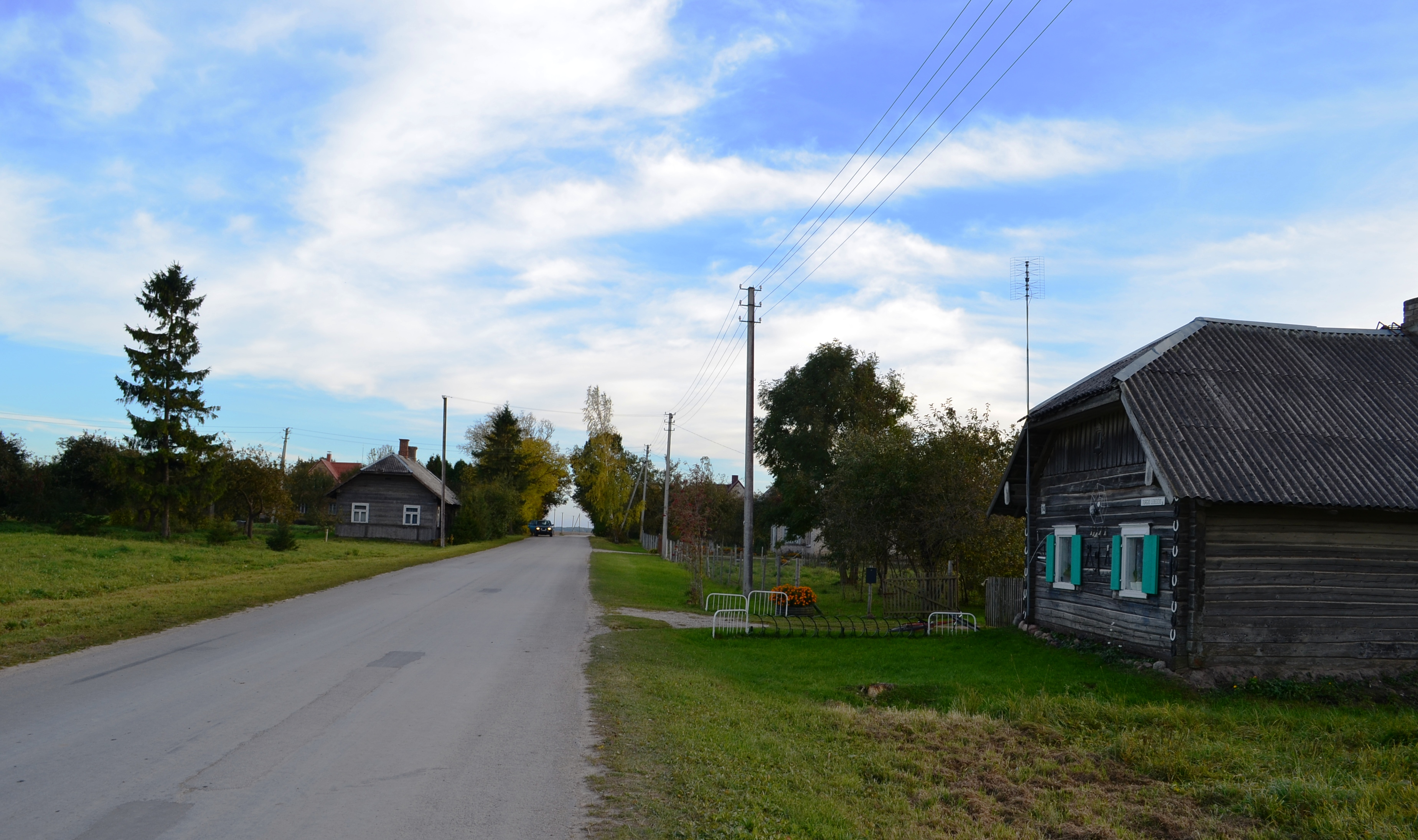

- Location in Lithuania Devynduoniai (Lithuania)
- Coordinates: 55°31′52″N 23°53′49″E
- Country: Lithuania
- County: Kaunas County
- Municipality: Kėdainiai district municipality
- Eldership: Gudžiūnai Eldership

Population (2011)
  - Total: 161
- Time zone: UTC+2 (EET)
  - Summer (DST): UTC+3 (EEST)

Devynduoniai (formerly Russian: Девиндоня, Polish: Dewindonie) is a village in Kėdainiai district municipality, in Kaunas County, in central Lithuania. According to the 2011 census, the village has a population of 161 people. It is located 7 km from Gudžiūnai, by the Liaudė river.

== History ==
Devynduoniai village is known since 1593. During Soviet era it was a subsidiary settlement of "Žemaitė" kolkhoz.

== Demography ==
Historical population

| Year | Pop. | ±% p.a. |
|---|---|---|
| 1902 | 695 | — |
| 1923 | 471 | −1.84% |
| 1959 | 289 | −1.35% |
| 1970 | 218 | −2.53% |
| 1979 | 233 | +0.74% |

| Year | Pop. | ±% p.a. |
|---|---|---|
| 1985 | 221 | −0.88% |
| 1989 | 216 | −0.57% |
| 2001 | 223 | +0.27% |
| 2011 | 161 | −3.21% |

Source: 1923, 1959 & 1970, 1979, 1989, 2001, 2011
