= Vikaičiai =

- Village
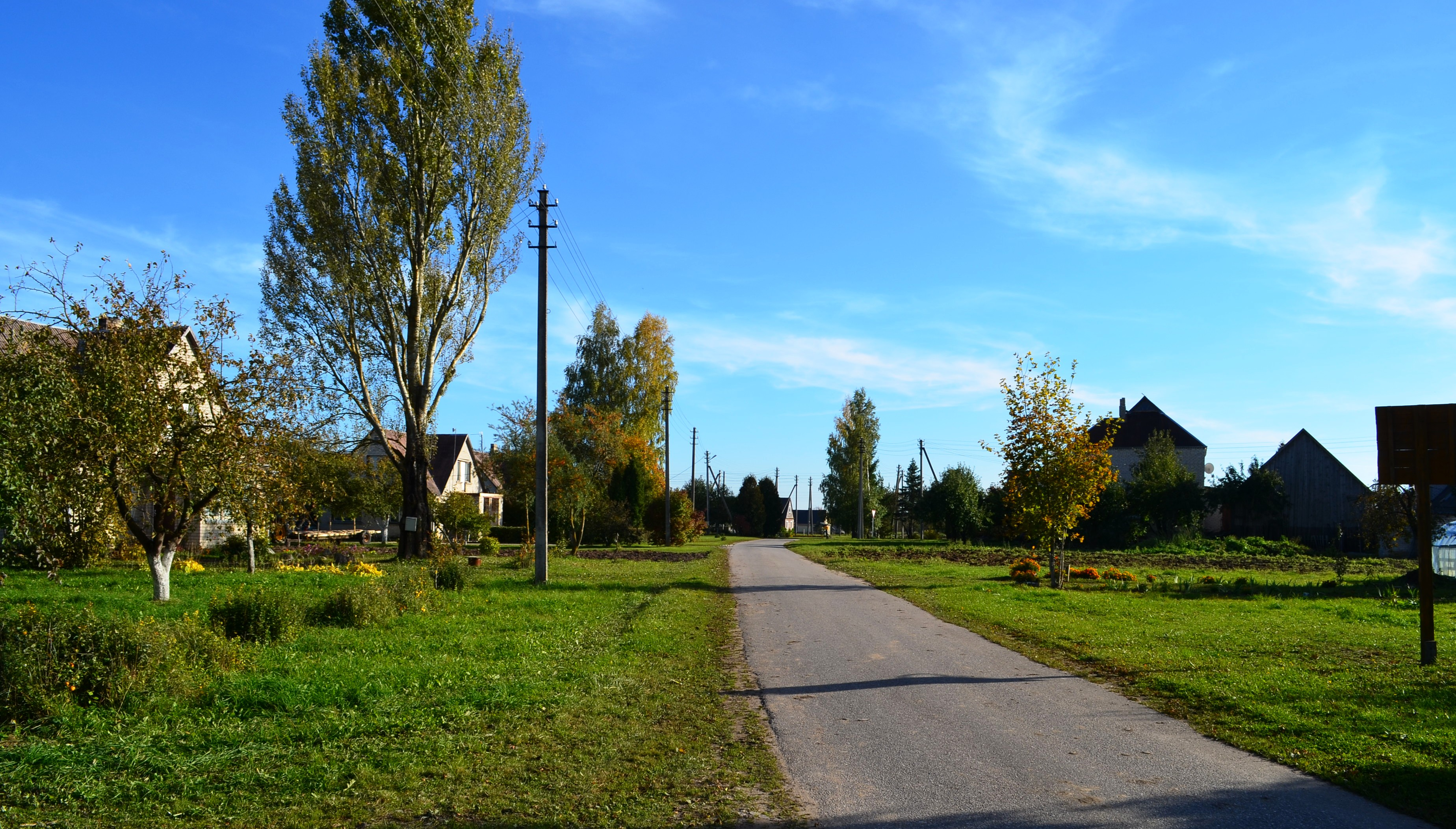

- Location in Lithuania Vikaičiai (Lithuania)
- Coordinates: 55°30′40″N 23°49′19″E
- Country: Lithuania
- County: Kaunas County
- Municipality: Kėdainiai district municipality
- Eldership: Gudžiūnai Eldership

Population (2011)
  - Total: 305
- Time zone: UTC+2 (EET)
  - Summer (DST): UTC+3 (EEST)

Vikaičiai is a village in Kėdainiai district municipality, in Kaunas County, in central Lithuania. According to the 2011 census, the village had a population of 305 people. It is located 5 km from Gudžiūnai, by the Nykis and Druskalnis rivers. There are a library and a former school building.

During the Soviet era Vikaičiai was "Žemaitė" kolkhoz center.

== Demography ==
Historical population

Year	Pop.	±% p.a.
1959	83	—
1970	140	+4.87%
1979	242	+6.27%
1987	283	+1.98%

Year	Pop.	±% p.a.
1989	317	+5.84%
2001	357	+1.00%
2011	305	−1.56%

Source: 1902, 1923, 1959 & 1970, 1979, 1989, 2001, 2011
