= Gudžiūnai Forest =

Forest in Lithuania

Gudžiūnai Forest Lithuanian: Gudžiūnų miškas
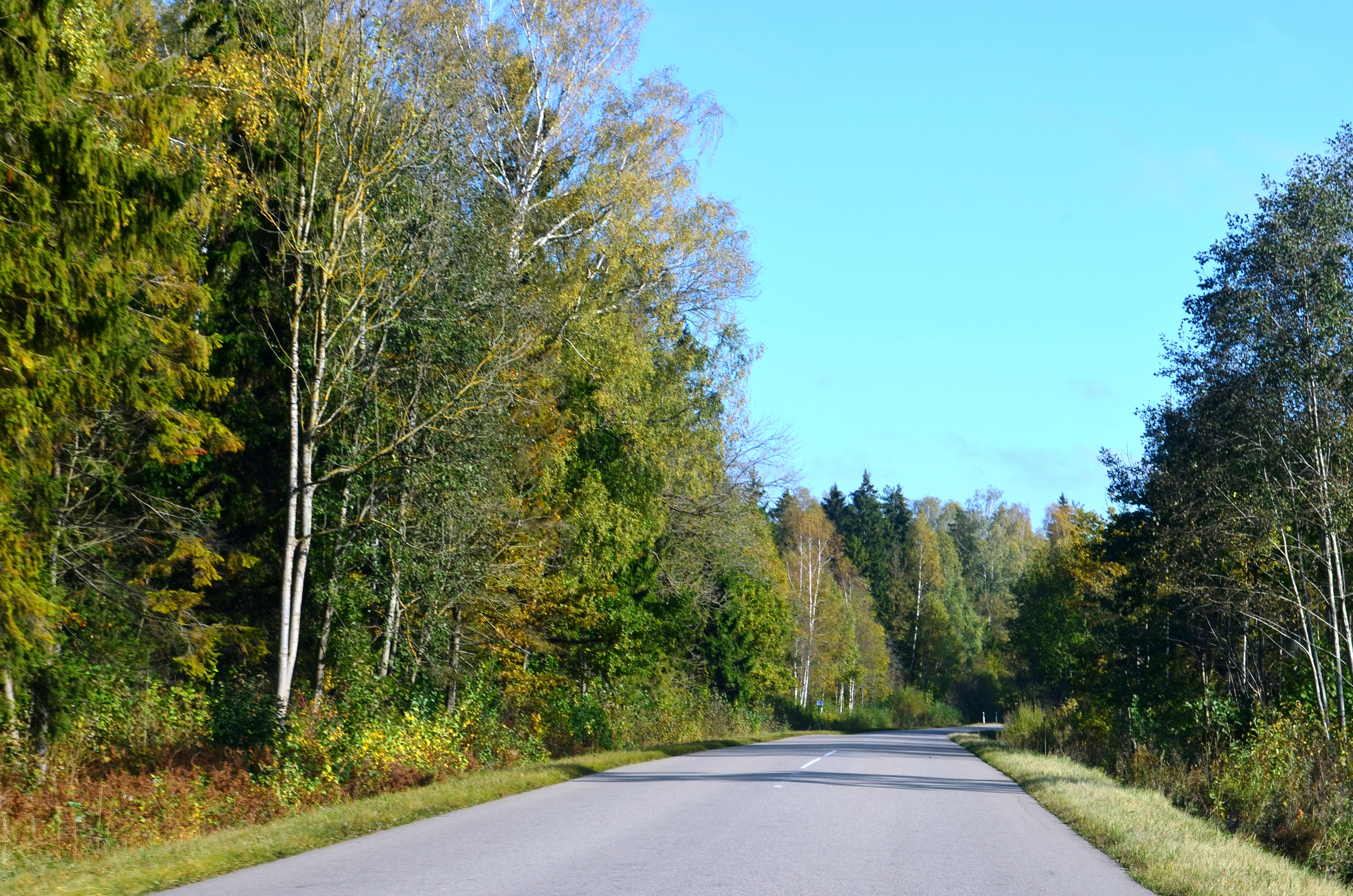
- Gudžiūnai forest to the east from Skėmiai village

- Location within Lithuania
- Interactive map of Gudžiūnai Forest

Geography
- Location: Radviliškis District Municipality, Lithuania
- Coordinates: 55.551°N 23.801°E
- Area: 11.8 km^{2} (4.6 sq mi)

Ecology
- Forest cover: birch, spruce, ash
- Fauna: wild boar, roe deer

The Gudžiūnai Forest (Lithuanian: Gudžiūnų miškas) is a forest mostly in Radviliškis District Municipality, central Lithuania, located to the south of Baisogala and to the north east of Gudžiūnai. It covers 11.8 km^{2} area. The rivers Liaudė and Garduva drain the forest.

38 % of the area is covered by birch, 41 % by spruce, 6 % by ash, 5 % by black alder, 9 % by aspen combined with oak and other tree groups. Vilnius-Šiauliai railway goes across the forest.
