= Alksnėnai, Gudžiūnai =

Alksnėnai
- Village
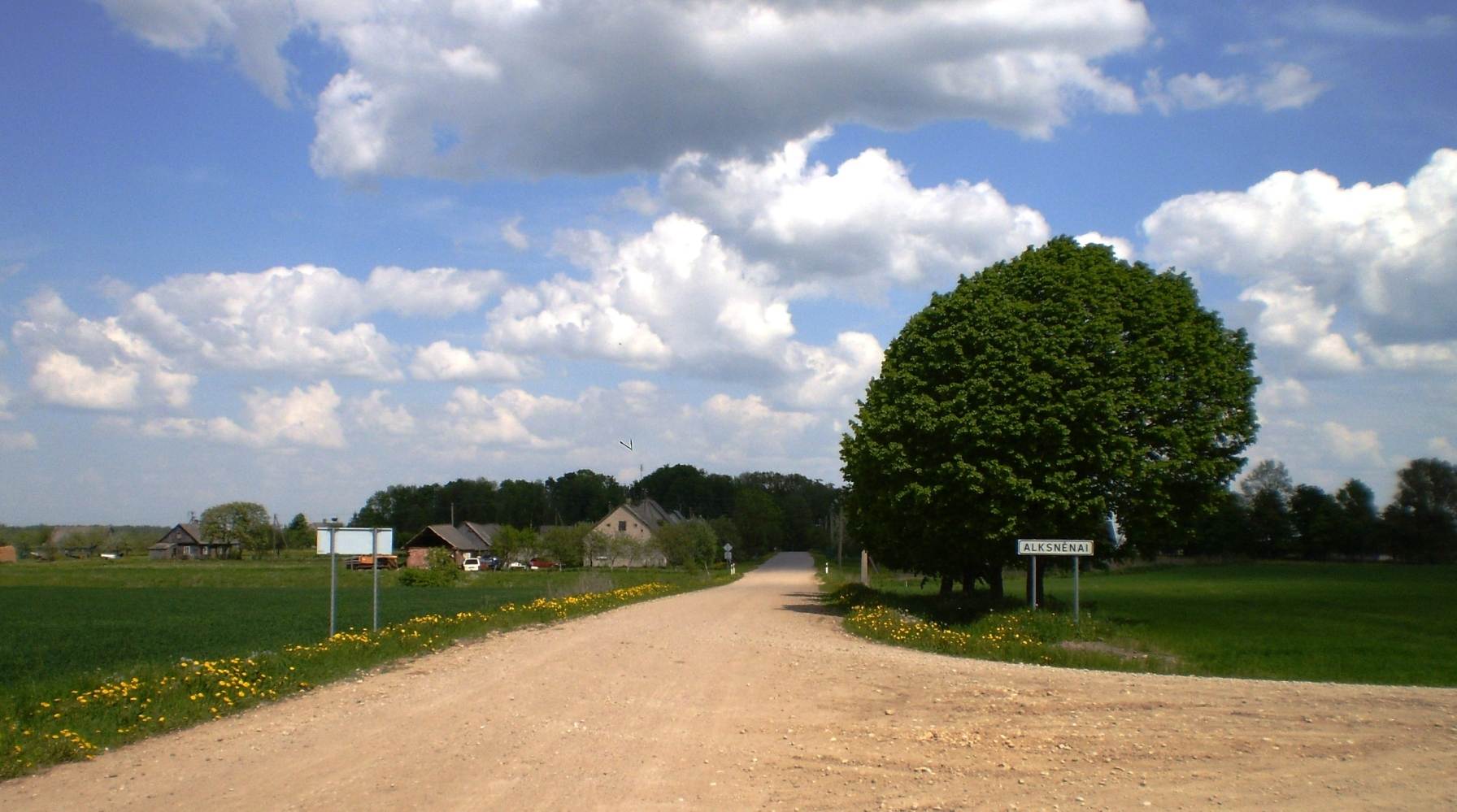

- Location in Lithuania
- Coordinates: 55°28′59″N 23°50′10″E
- Country: Lithuania
- County: Kaunas County
- Municipality: Kėdainiai district municipality
- Eldership: Gudžiūnai Eldership

Population (2011)
  - Total: 113
- Time zone: UTC+2 (EET)
  - Summer (DST): UTC+3 (EEST)

Alksnėnai is a village in Kėdainiai district municipality, in Kaunas County, in central Lithuania. According to the 2011 census, the village has a population of 113 people. It is located by the Kruostas river. There is a former school.

During Soviet era Alksnėnai was a subsidiary settlement of the "Nemunas" kolkhoz.

== Demography ==
Historical population

Year	Pop.	±% p.a.
1902	8	—
1959	119	+4.85%
1970	101	−1.48%
1979	130	+2.84%

Year	Pop.	±% p.a.
1984	131	+0.15%
1989	115	−2.57%
2001	169	+3.26%
2011	113	−3.95%

Source: 1902, 1923, 1959 & 1970, 1979, 1989, 2001, 2011

== Gallery ==
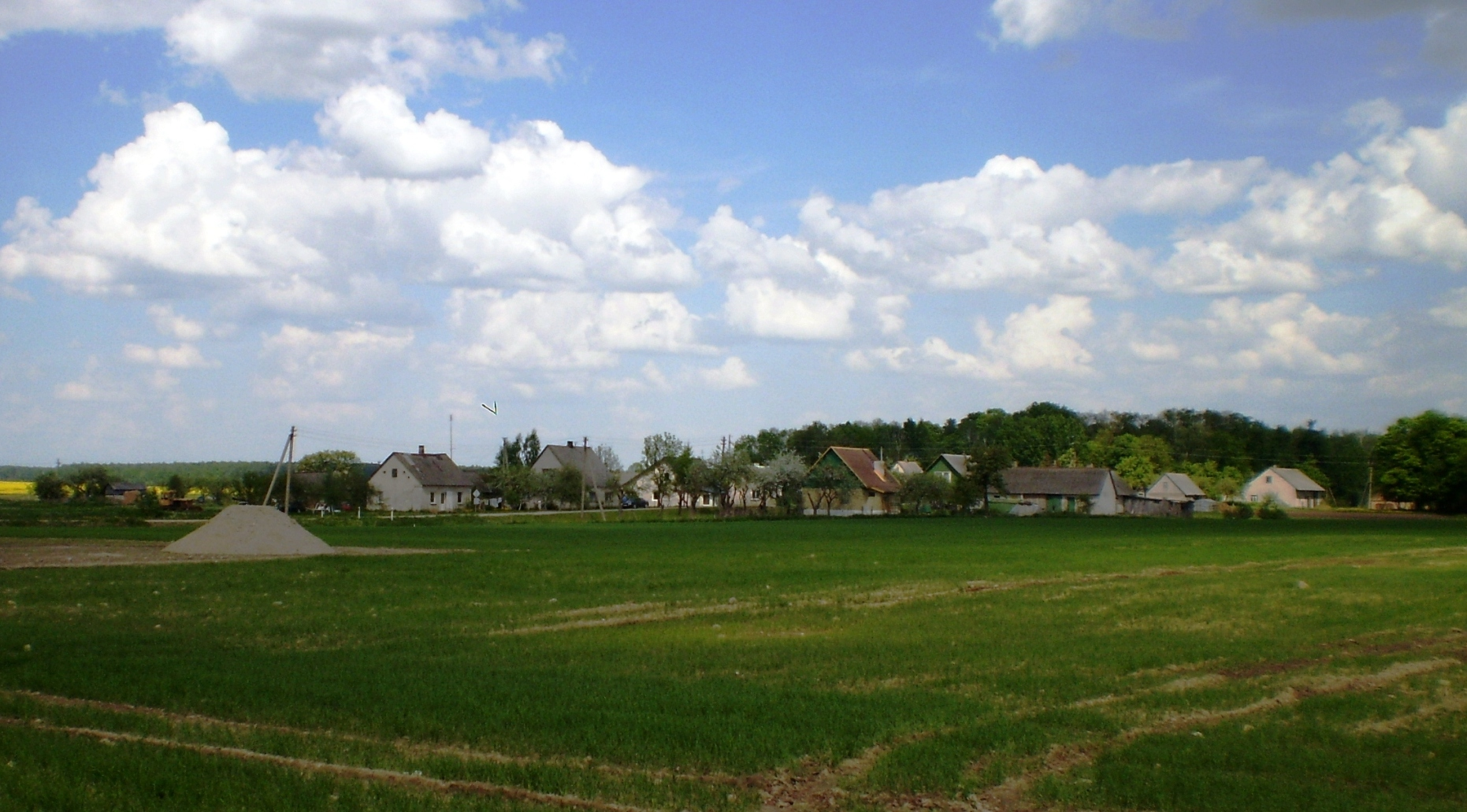
Village panorama

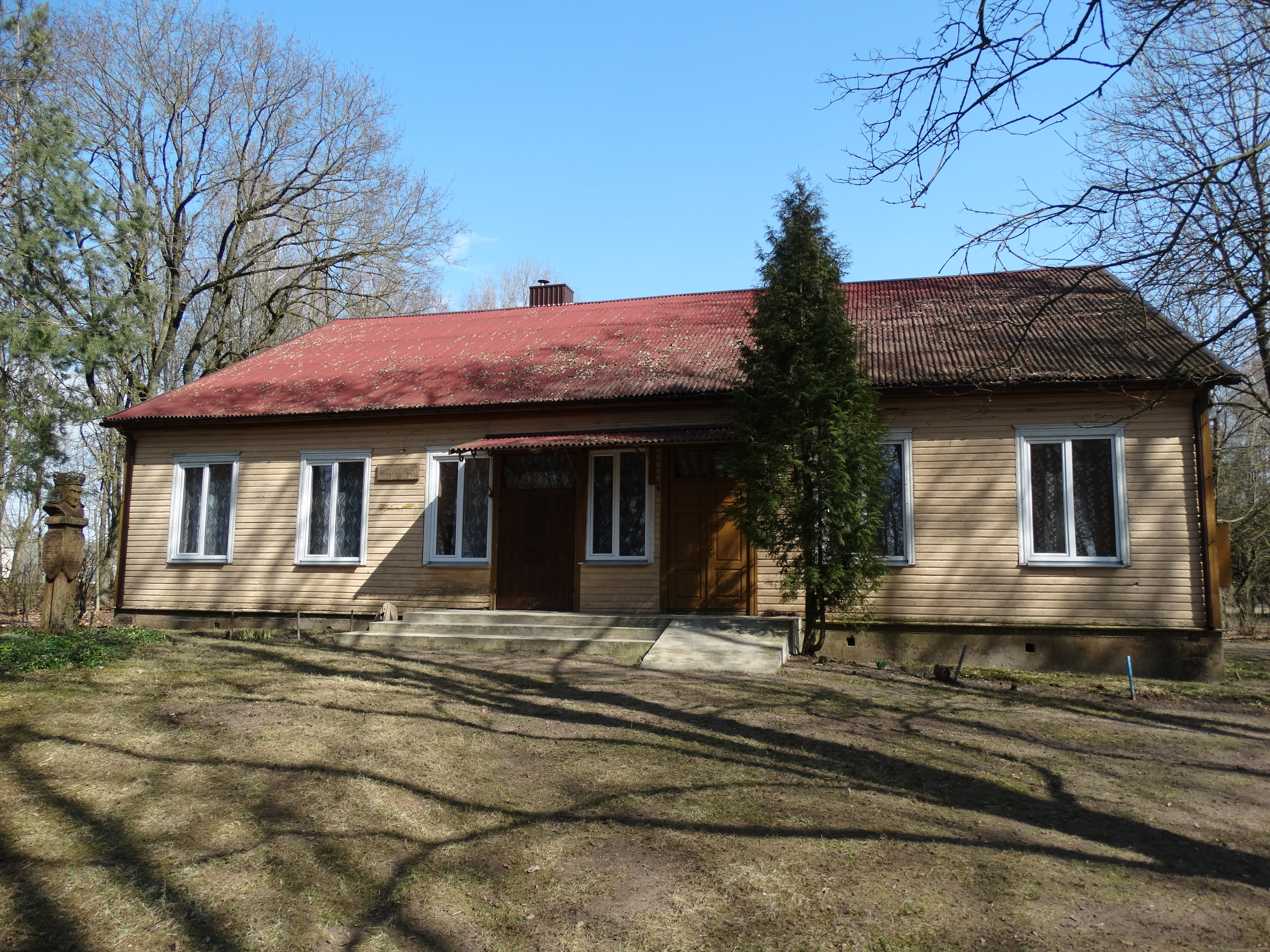
Community house and Vytautas monument
