= Miegėnai =

- Village
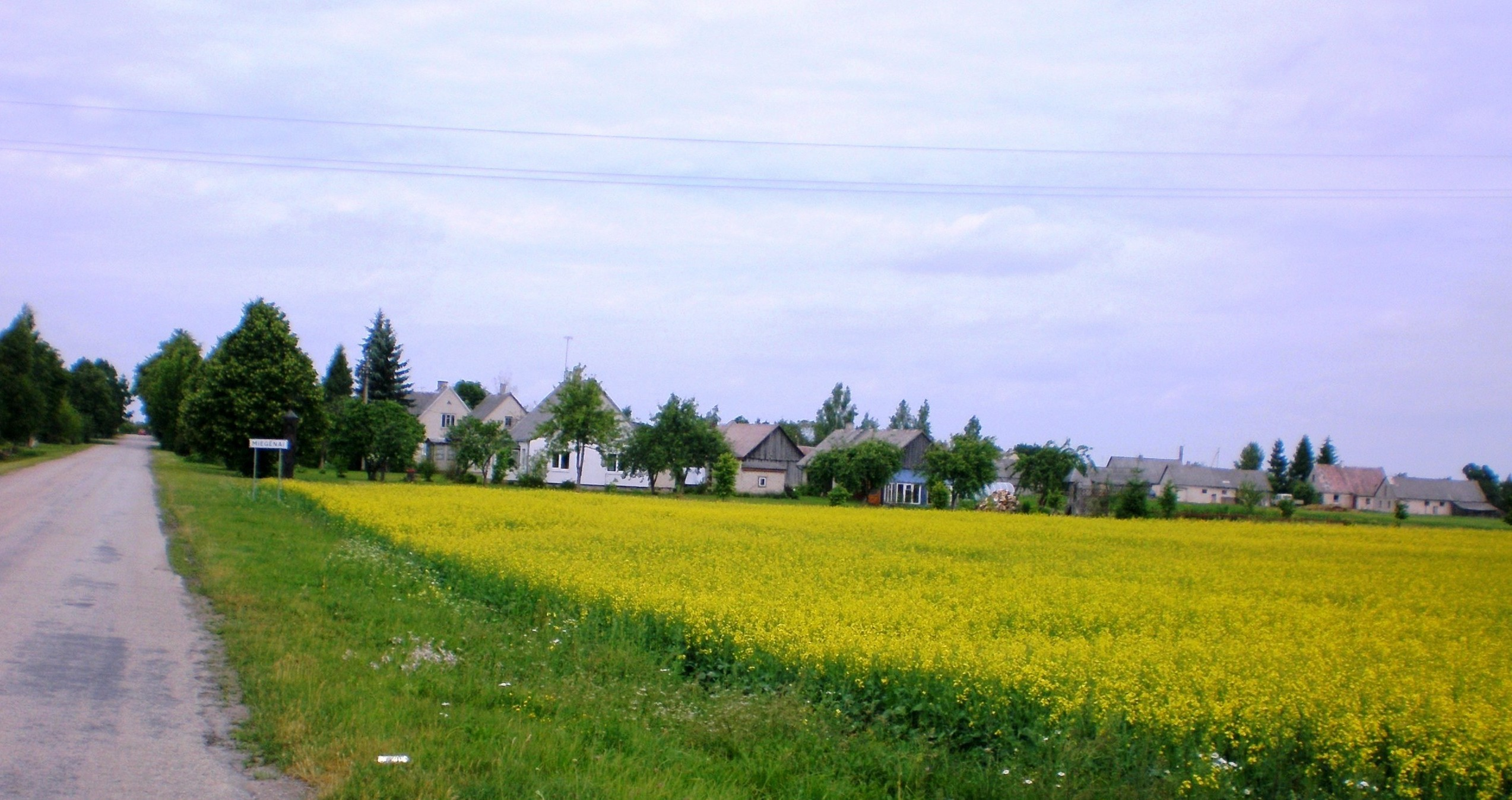

- Location in Lithuania Miegėnai (Lithuania)
- Coordinates: 55°29′49″N 23°54′40″E
- Country: Lithuania
- County: Kaunas County
- Municipality: Kėdainiai district municipality
- Eldership: Gudžiūnai Eldership

Population (2011)
  - Total: 341
- Time zone: UTC+2 (EET)
  - Summer (DST): UTC+3 (EEST)

Miegėnai (formerly Russian: Мегяны, Polish: Miegiany) is a village in Kėdainiai district municipality, in Kaunas County, in central Lithuania. According to the 2011 census, the village has a population of 341 people. It is located 9 km from Gudžiūnai, by the Nykis river. There are library, farm cooperative, former school, former windmill and post office in Miegėnai.

== History ==
Miegėnai (as Megene) is included to the list of devastated Lithuanian villages by Teutonic Order in 1372. During Soviet era Miegėnai was "Nemunas" kolkhoz center.

== Demography ==
Historical population

Year	Pop.	±% p.a.
1820	146	—
1902	113	−0.31%
1923	178	+2.19%
1959	198	+0.30%
1970	272	+2.93%

Year	Pop.	±% p.a.
1979	327	+2.07%
1986	333	+0.26%
1989	372	+3.76%
2001	388	+0.35%
2011	341	−1.28%

Source: 1902, 1923, 1959 & 1970, 1979, 1989, 2001, 2011

== Gallery ==
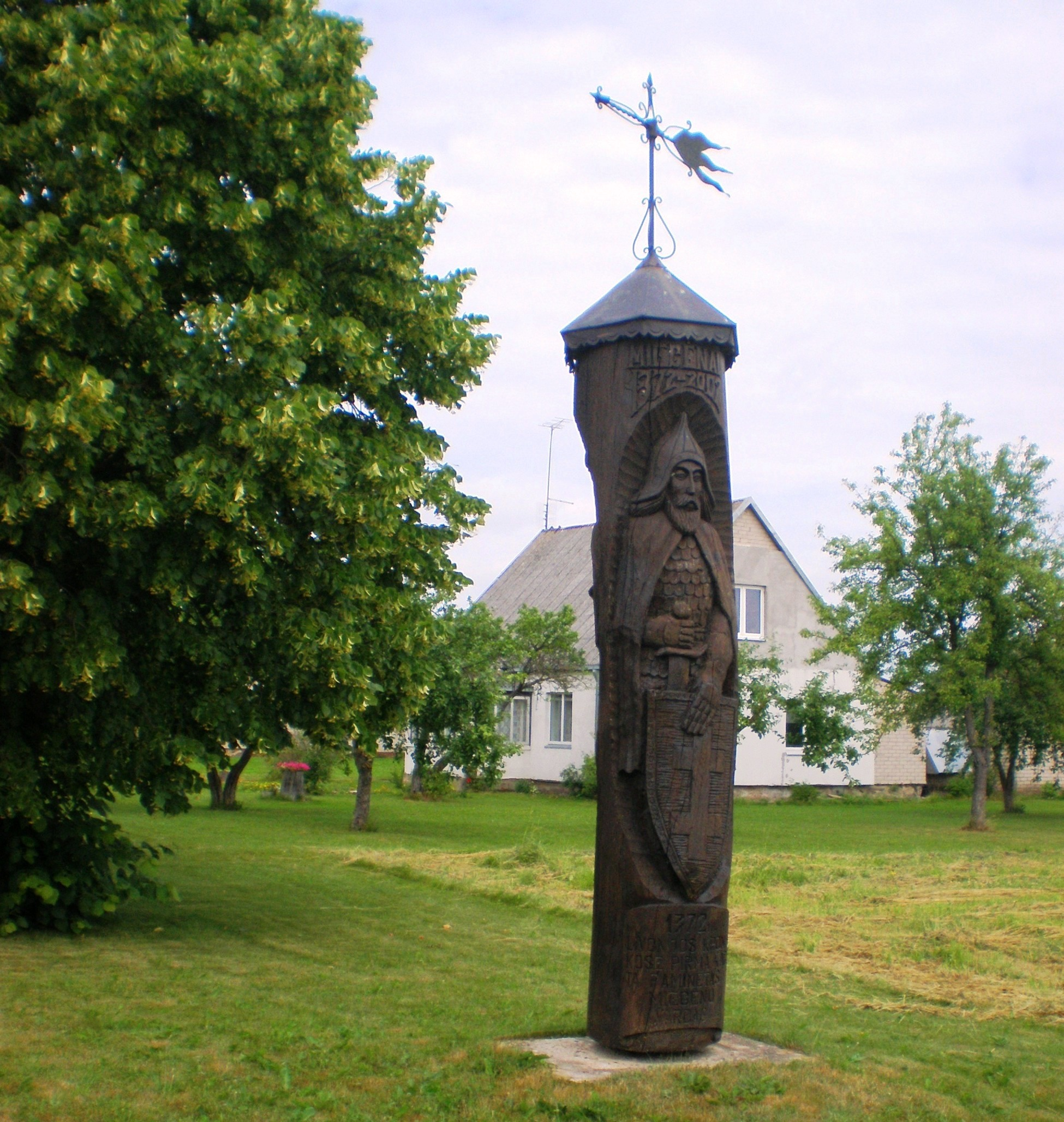
A monument to the first mention of Miegėnai

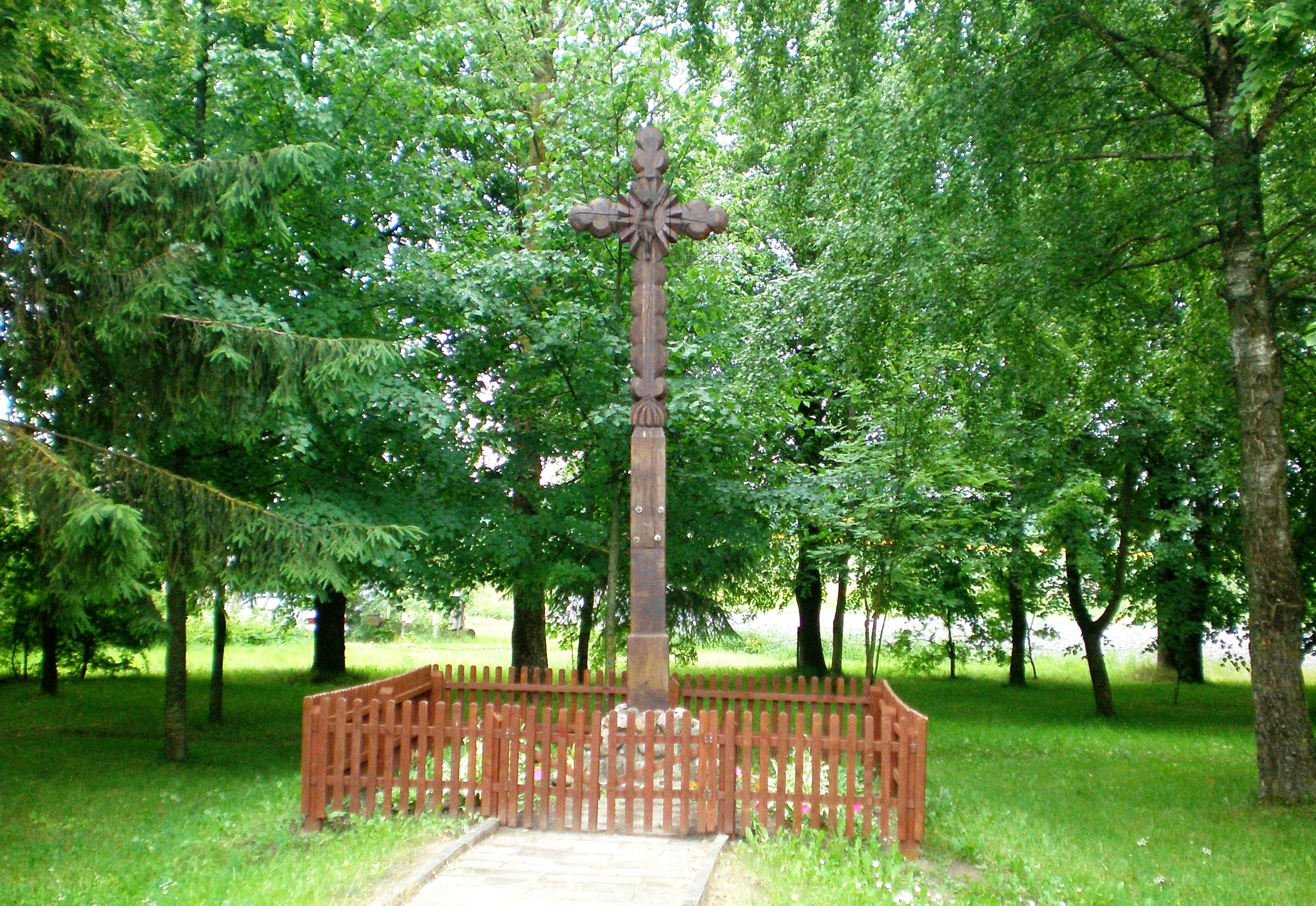
A cross

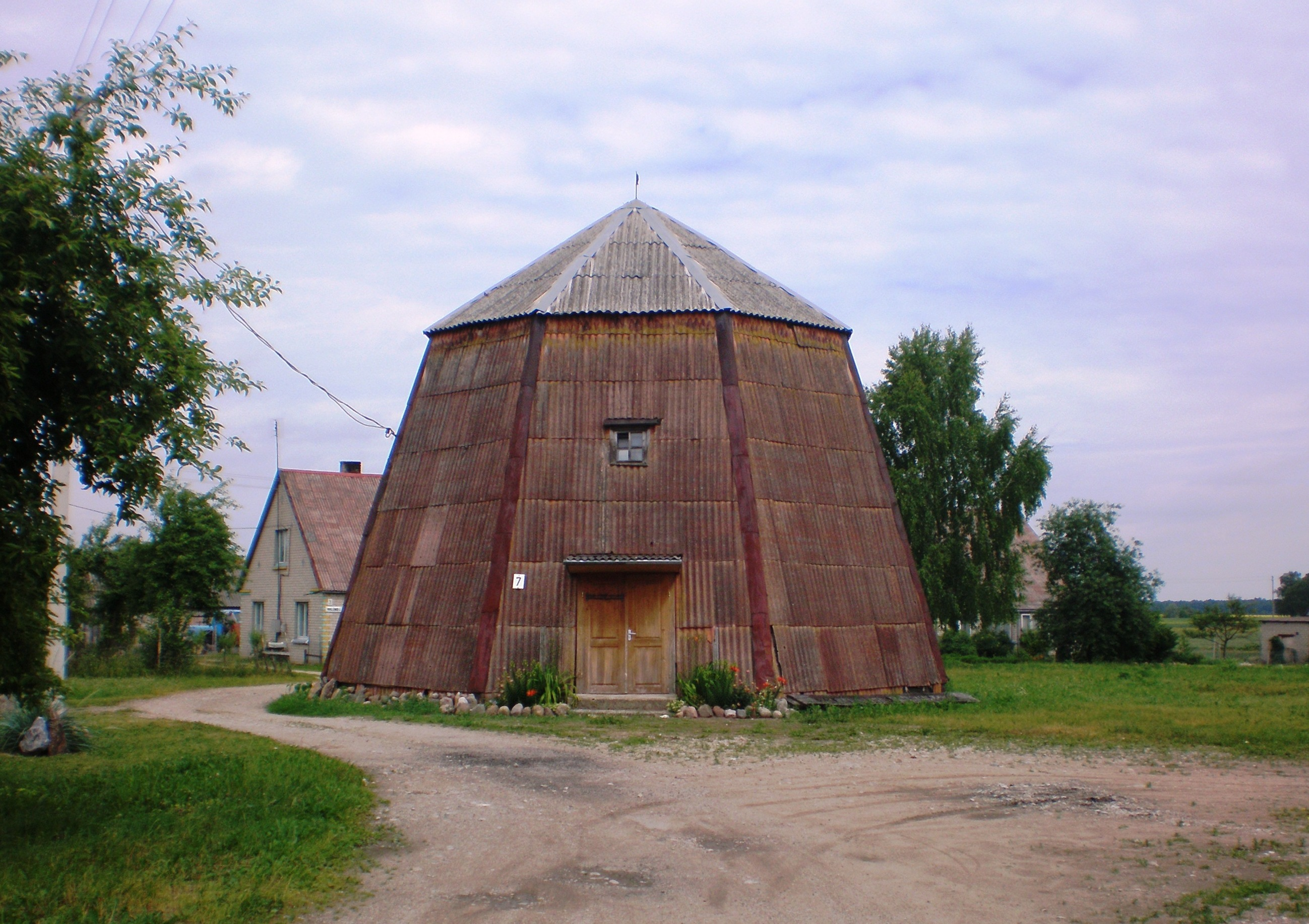
Former windmill

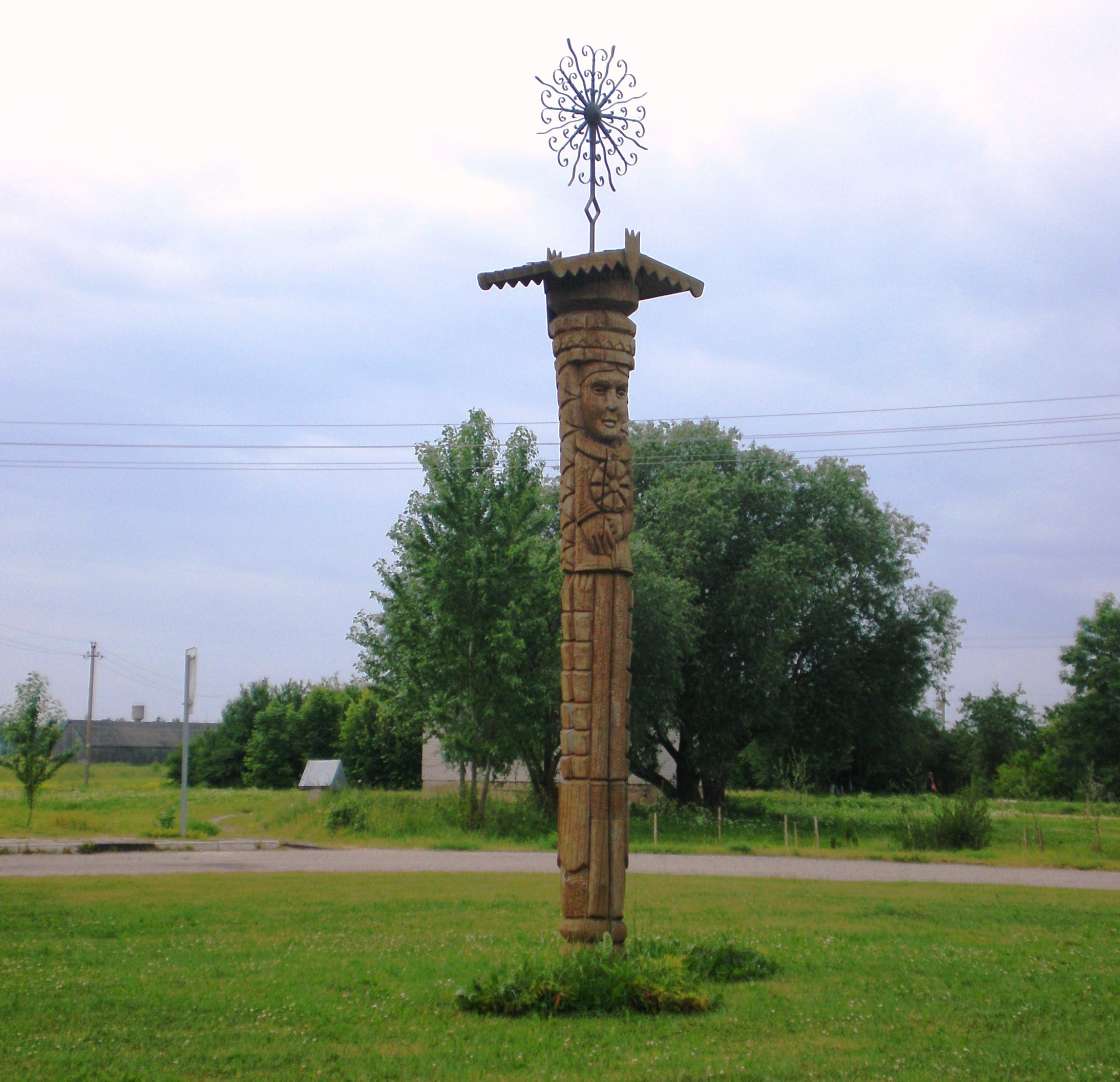
A roofed pole in Miegėnai
