= Jaunakaimis, Gudžiūnai =

Jaunakaimis
- Village
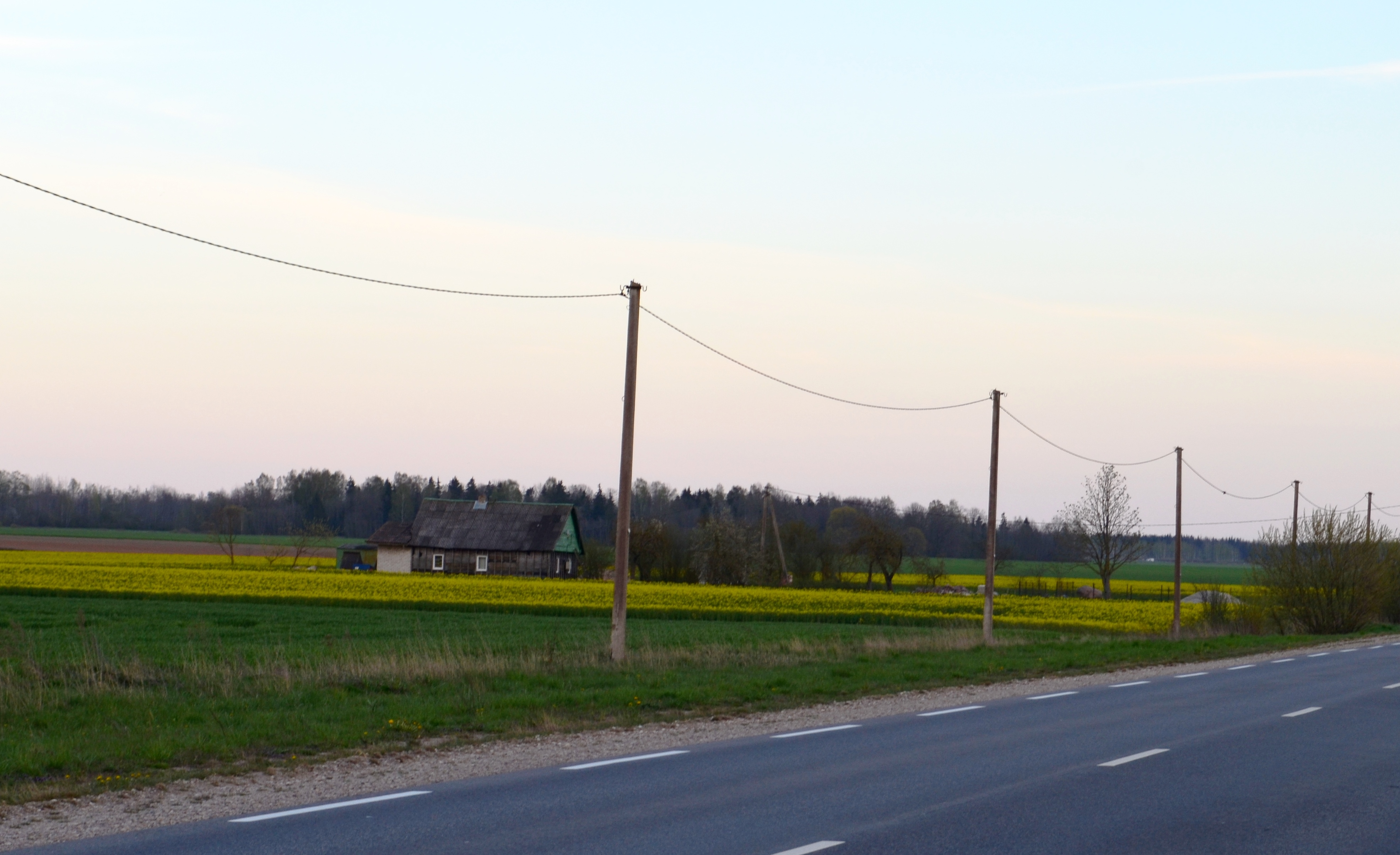

- Location in Lithuania
- Coordinates: 55°30′00″N 23°48′00″E
- Country: Lithuania
- County: Kaunas County
- Municipality: Kėdainiai district municipality
- Eldership: Gudžiūnai Eldership

Population (2011)
  - Total: 0
- Time zone: UTC+2 (EET)
  - Summer (DST): UTC+3 (EEST)

Jaunakaimis is a village in Kėdainiai district municipality, in Kaunas County, in central Lithuania. According to the 2011 census, the village was uninhabited. It is located by the Jonava-Šeduva road, 2 km from Gudžiūnai. The larger part of the village is located in Dotnuva Eldership (as Jaunakaimis).

== Demography ==
Historical population

Year	Pop.	±% p.a.
1959	29	—
1970	23	−2.09%
1979	4	−17.66%

Year	Pop.	±% p.a.
1989	3	−2.84%
2001	4	+2.43%
2011	0	−100.00%

Source: 1923, 1959 & 1970, 1979, 1989, 2001, 2011
