= Margininkai, Kėdainiai =

Margininkai
- Village
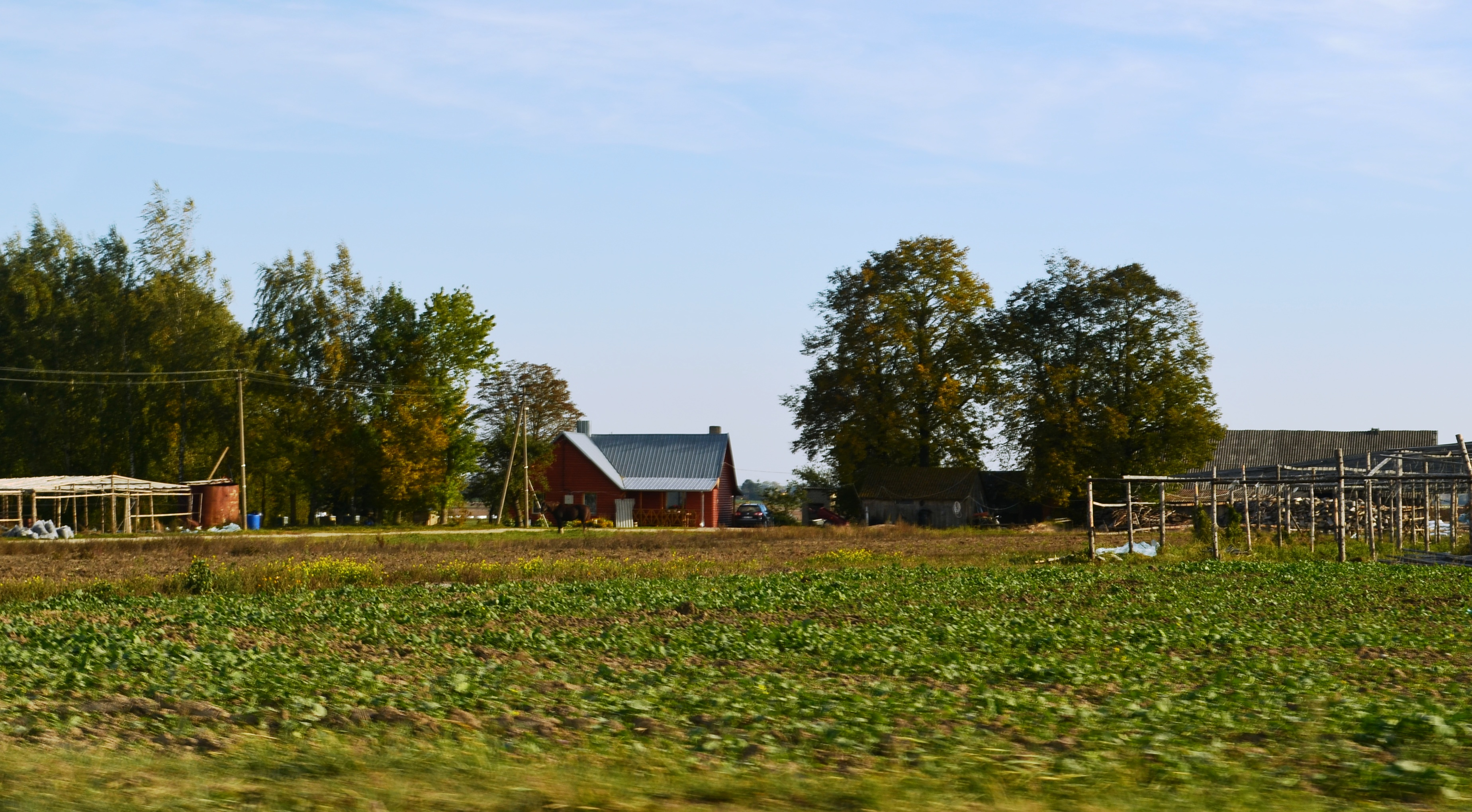

- Location in Lithuania
- Coordinates: 55°31′08″N 23°51′50″E
- Country: Lithuania
- County: Kaunas County
- Municipality: Kėdainiai district municipality
- Eldership: Gudžiūnai Eldership

Population (2011)
  - Total: 14
- Time zone: UTC+2 (EET)
  - Summer (DST): UTC+3 (EEST)

Margininkai is a village in Kėdainiai district municipality, in Kaunas County, in central Lithuania. According to the 2011 census, the village has a population of 14 people. It is located 6 km from Gudžiūnai, by the Nykis river.

== Demography ==
Historical population

Year	Pop.	±% p.a.
1959	119	—
1970	111	−0.63%
1979	58	−6.96%

Year	Pop.	±% p.a.
1989	33	−5.48%
2001	24	−2.62%
2011	14	−5.25%

Source: 1923, 1959 & 1970, 1979, 1989, 2001, 2011
