= Jaunakaimis =

- Village
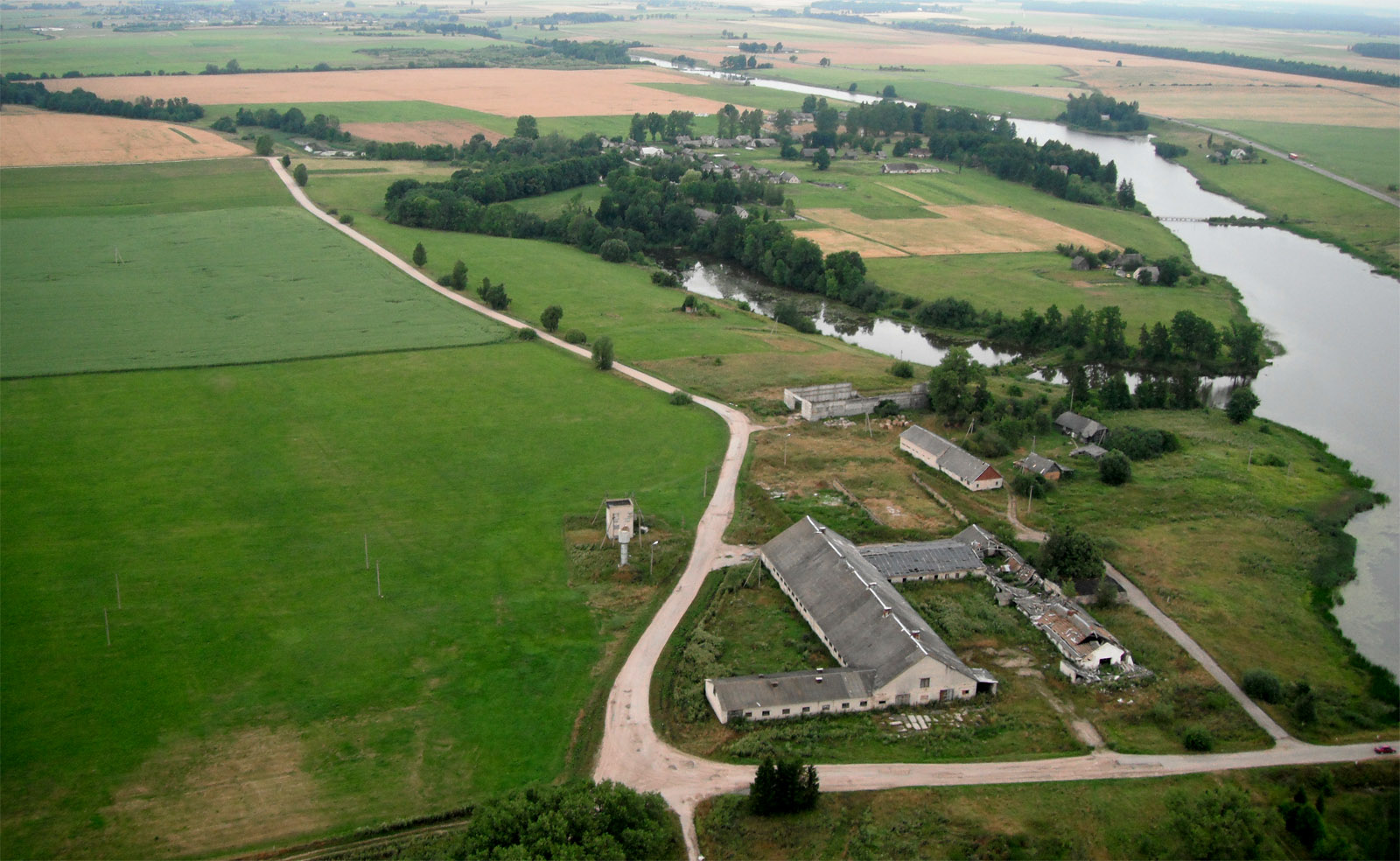

- Location in Lithuania Jaunakaimis (Lithuania)
- Coordinates: 55°28′52″N 23°46′41″E
- Country: Lithuania
- County: Kaunas County
- Municipality: Kėdainiai district municipality
- Eldership: Dotnuva Eldership

Population (2011)
  - Total: 41
- Time zone: UTC+2 (EET)
  - Summer (DST): UTC+3 (EEST)

Jaunakaimis ('New village') is a village in Kėdainiai district municipality, in Kaunas County, in central Lithuania. According to the 2011 census, the village has a population of 41 people. The village is located 3 km (1.9 mi) from Gudžiūnai, by the Dotnuvėlė river and Mantviliškis pond. A small part of the village (Jaunakaimis, Gudžiūnai) belongs to Gudžiūnai Eldership.

== Demography ==
Historical population

Year	Pop.	±% p.a.
1959	74	—
1970	101	+2.87%
1979	106	+0.54%

Year	Pop.	±% p.a.
1989	76	−3.27%
2001	81	+0.53%
2011	41	−6.58%

Source: 1902, 1923, 1959 & 1970, 1979, 1989, 2001, 2011
