= Rukai, Kėdainiai =

Rukai
- Village
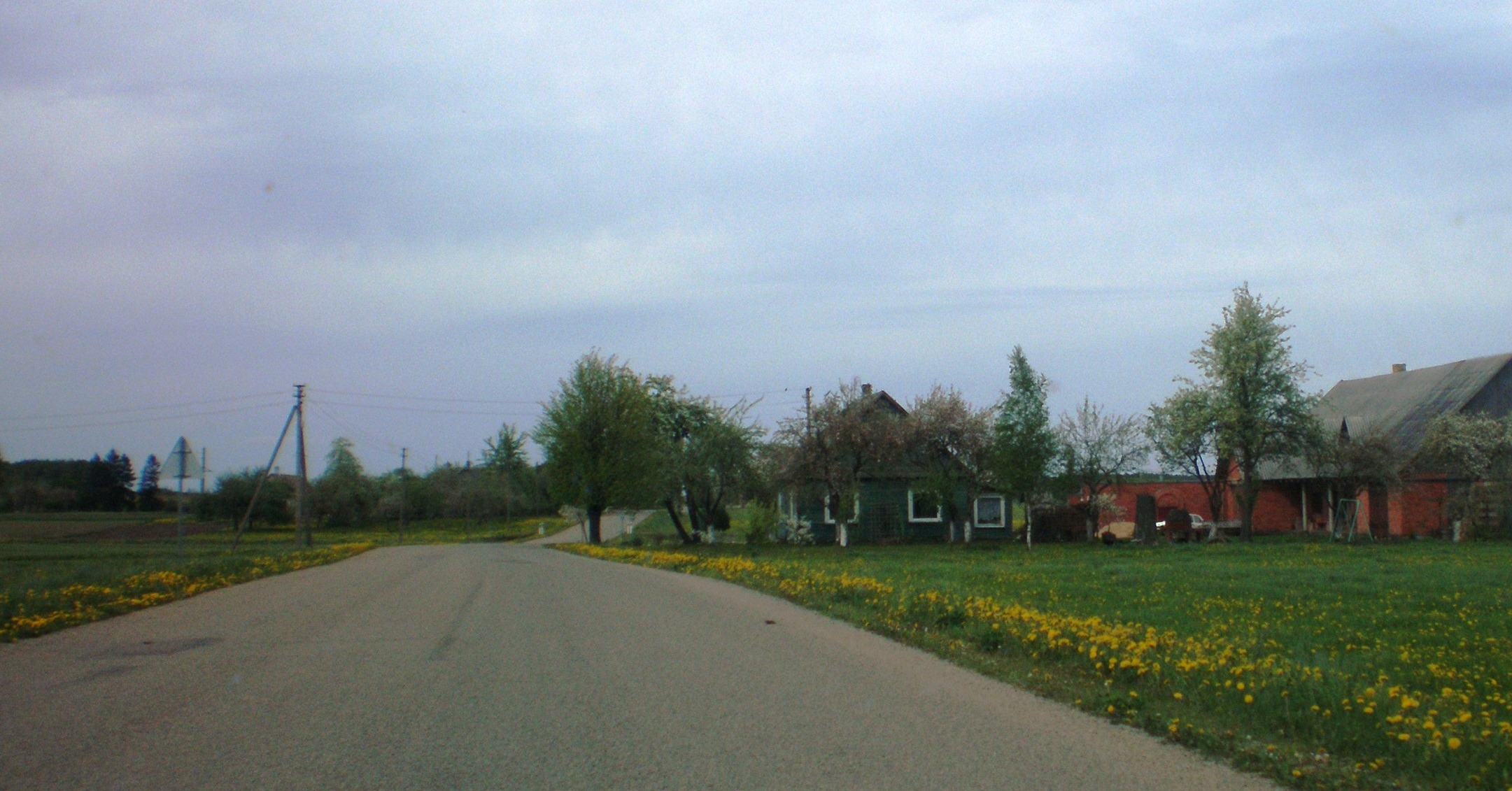

- Location in Lithuania Rukai (Lithuania)
- Coordinates: 55°27′50″N 23°44′49″E
- Country: Lithuania
- County: Kaunas County
- Municipality: Kėdainiai district municipality
- Eldership: Krakės Eldership

Population (2011)
  - Total: 45
- Time zone: UTC+2 (EET)
  - Summer (DST): UTC+3 (EEST)

Rukai (formerly Russian: Руки, Polish: Ruki) is a village in Kėdainiai district municipality, in Kaunas County, in central Lithuania. According to the 2011 census, the village had a population of 45 people. It is located 5 kilometres (3.1 mi) from Gudžiūnai, on the shore of the Rukai Lake.

== Demography ==
Historical population

Year	Pop.	±% p.a.
1902	238	—
1923	207	−0.66%
1959	158	−0.75%
1970	173	+0.83%

Year	Pop.	±% p.a.
1979	111	−4.81%
1989	82	−2.98%
2001	63	−2.17%
2011	45	−3.31%

Source: 1902, 1923, 1959 & 1970, 1979, 1989, 2001, 2011

== Images ==
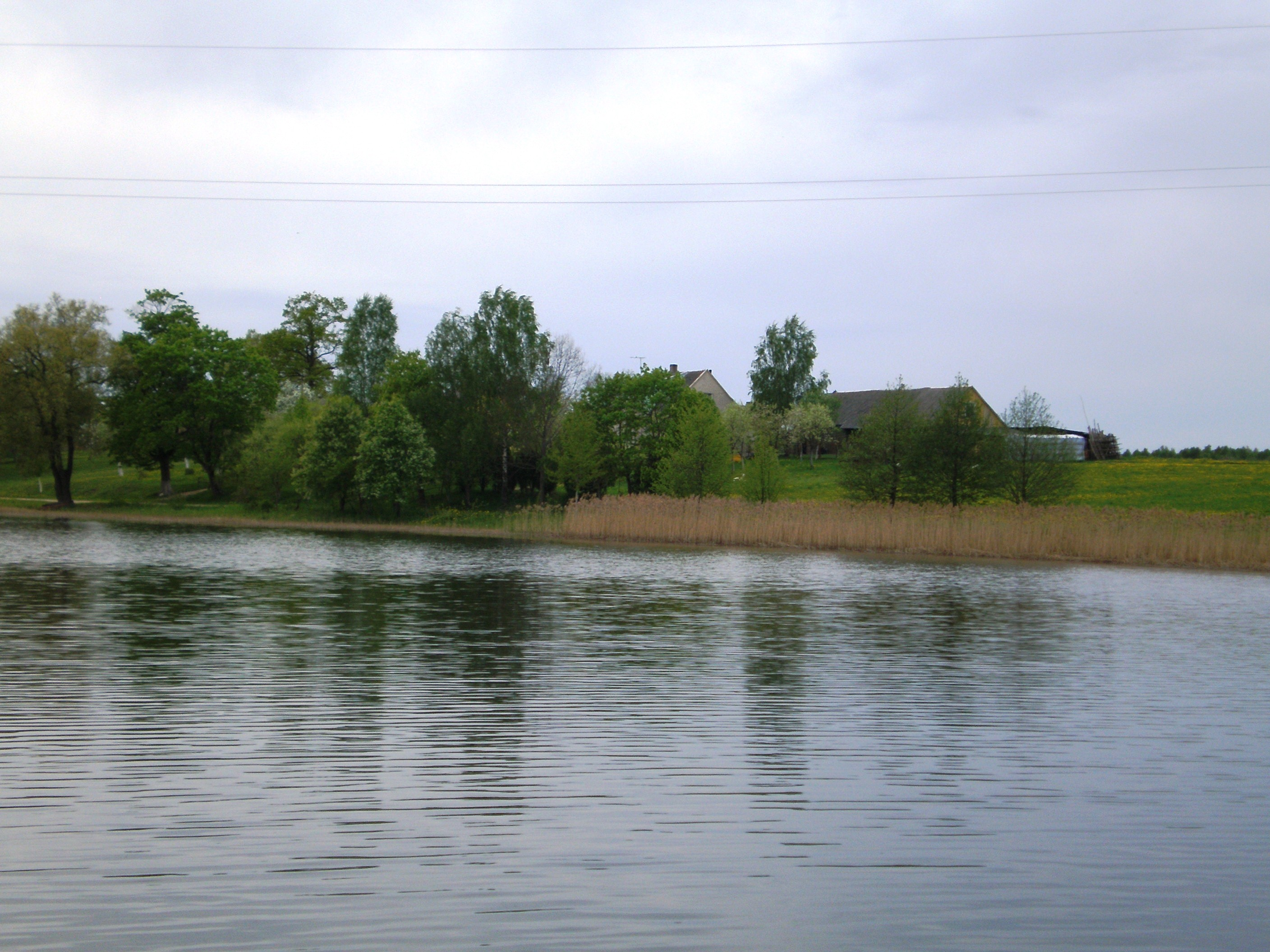
Rukai on the Rukai Lake

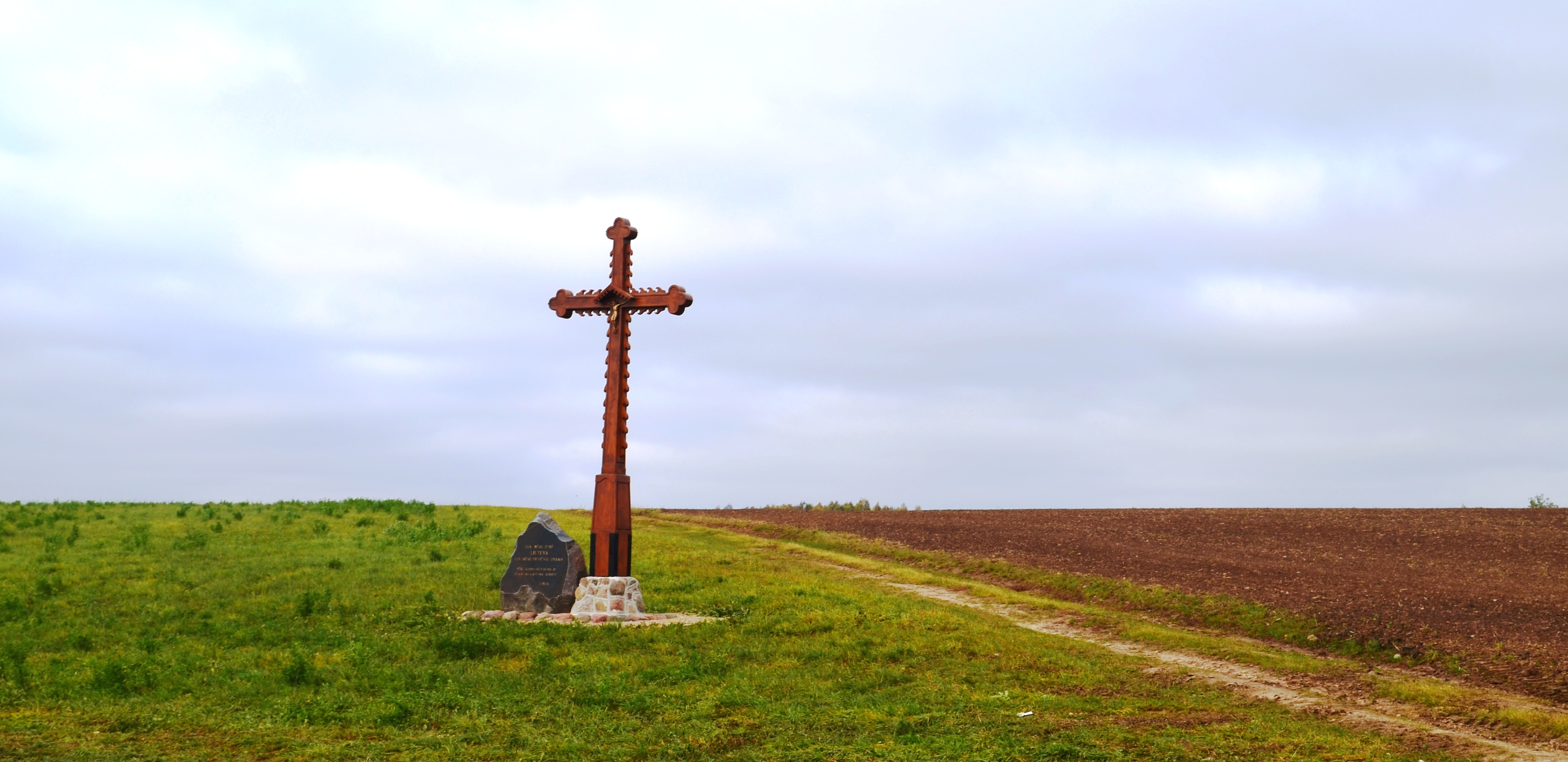
Rukai village cross
