= Gudžiūnų Geležinkelio Stotis =

Gudžiūnai GS
- Settlement
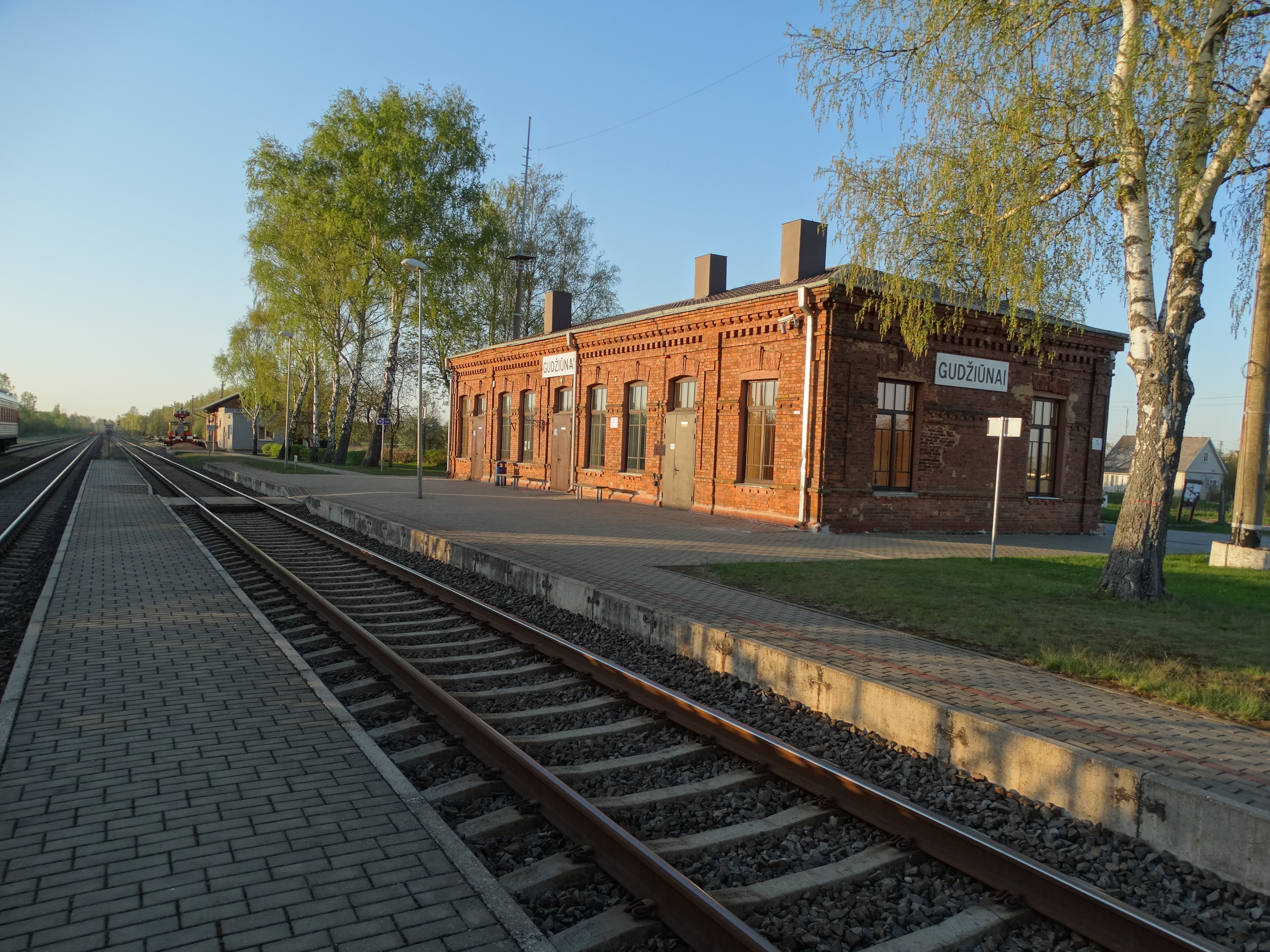

- Location in Lithuania
- Coordinates: 55°31′30″N 23°47′31″E
- Country: Lithuania
- County: Kaunas County
- Municipality: Kėdainiai district municipality
- Eldership: Gudžiūnai Eldership

Population (2011)
  - Total: 34
- Time zone: UTC+2 (EET)
  - Summer (DST): UTC+3 (EEST)

Gudžiūnų Geležinkelio Stotis ('Gudžiūnai train station', formerly Michelmontas, Russian: Михельмонтъ, Polish: Michelmont) is a train station settlement in Kėdainiai district municipality, in Kaunas County, in central Lithuania. According to the 2011 census, the settlement had a population of 34 people. It is located 2 km from Gudžiūnai, by the Mairiškiai-Gudžiūnai road and Vilnius-Šiauliai railway line.

At the 19th and the beginning of the 20th century Michelmont was a train station and an estate of 14 voloks.

== Demography ==
Historical population

Year	Pop.	±% p.a.
1902	46	—
1923	71	+2.09%
1959	66	−0.20%
1970	89	+2.76%

Year	Pop.	±% p.a.
1979	78	−1.46%
1989	70	−1.08%
2001	80	+1.12%
2011	34	−8.20%

Source: 1902, 1923, 1959 & 1970, 1979, 1989, 2001, 2011

== Images ==
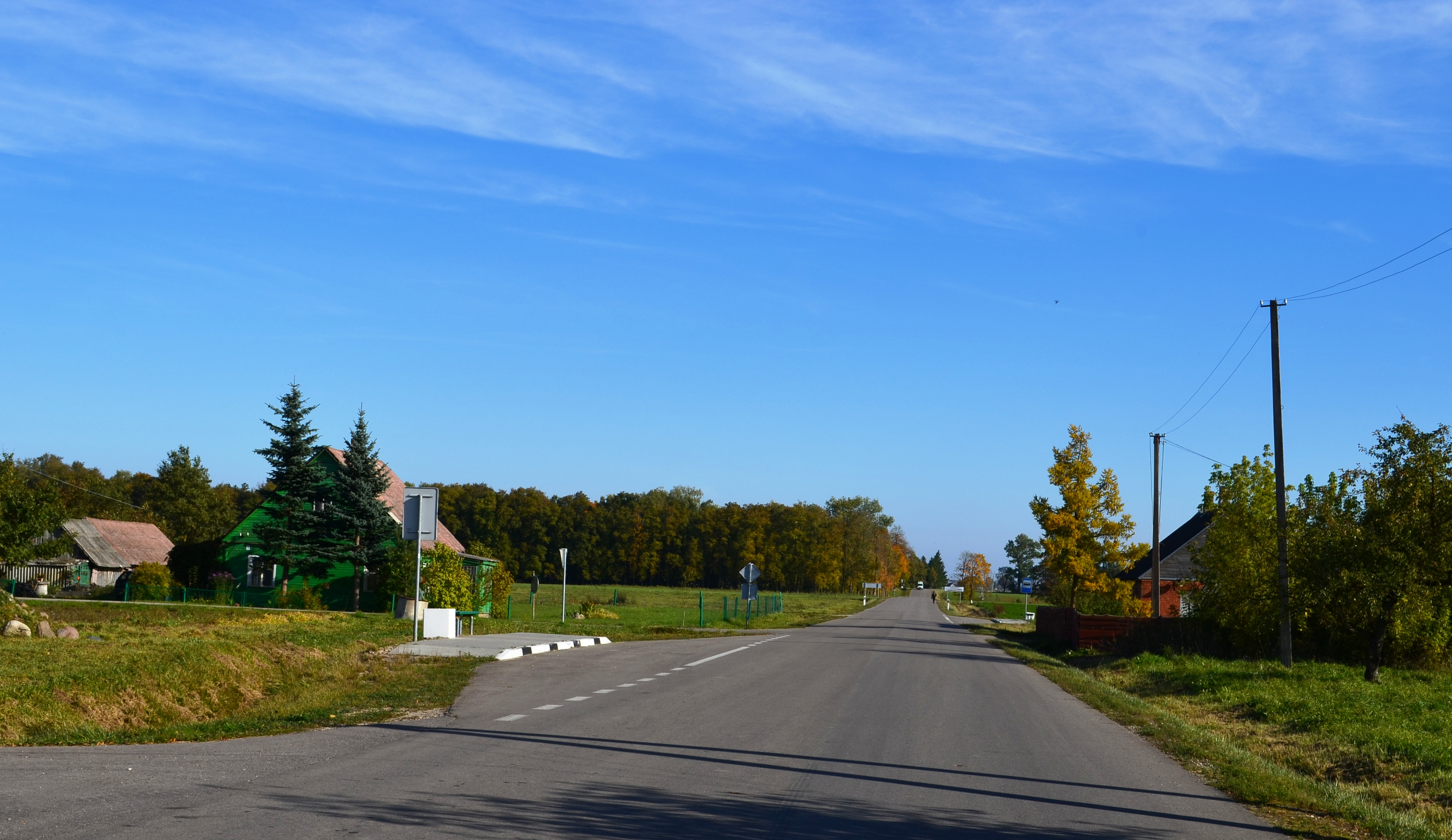
The settlement

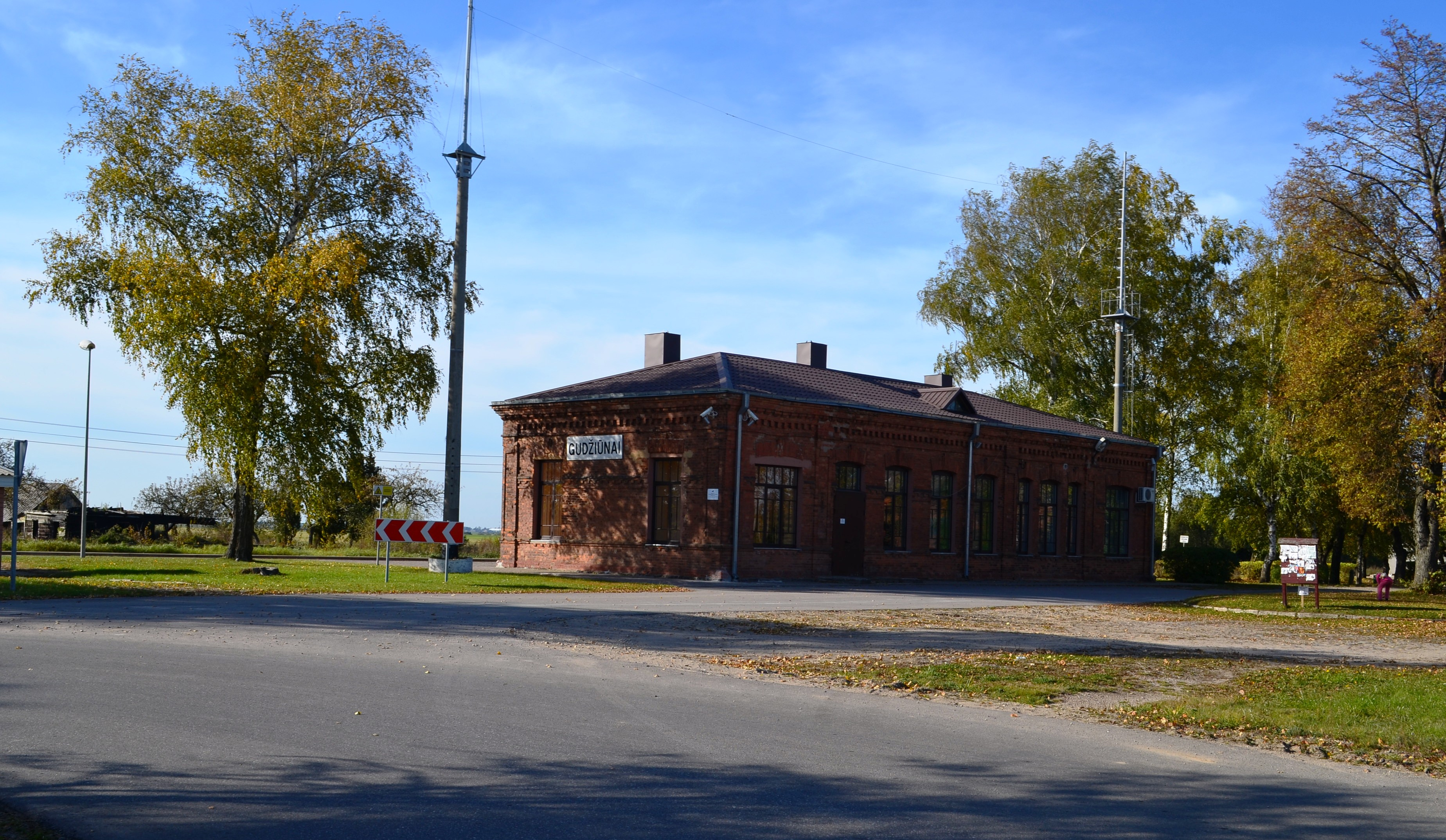
Train station
