= Rukai Lake =

Lake in Lithuania

Rukai
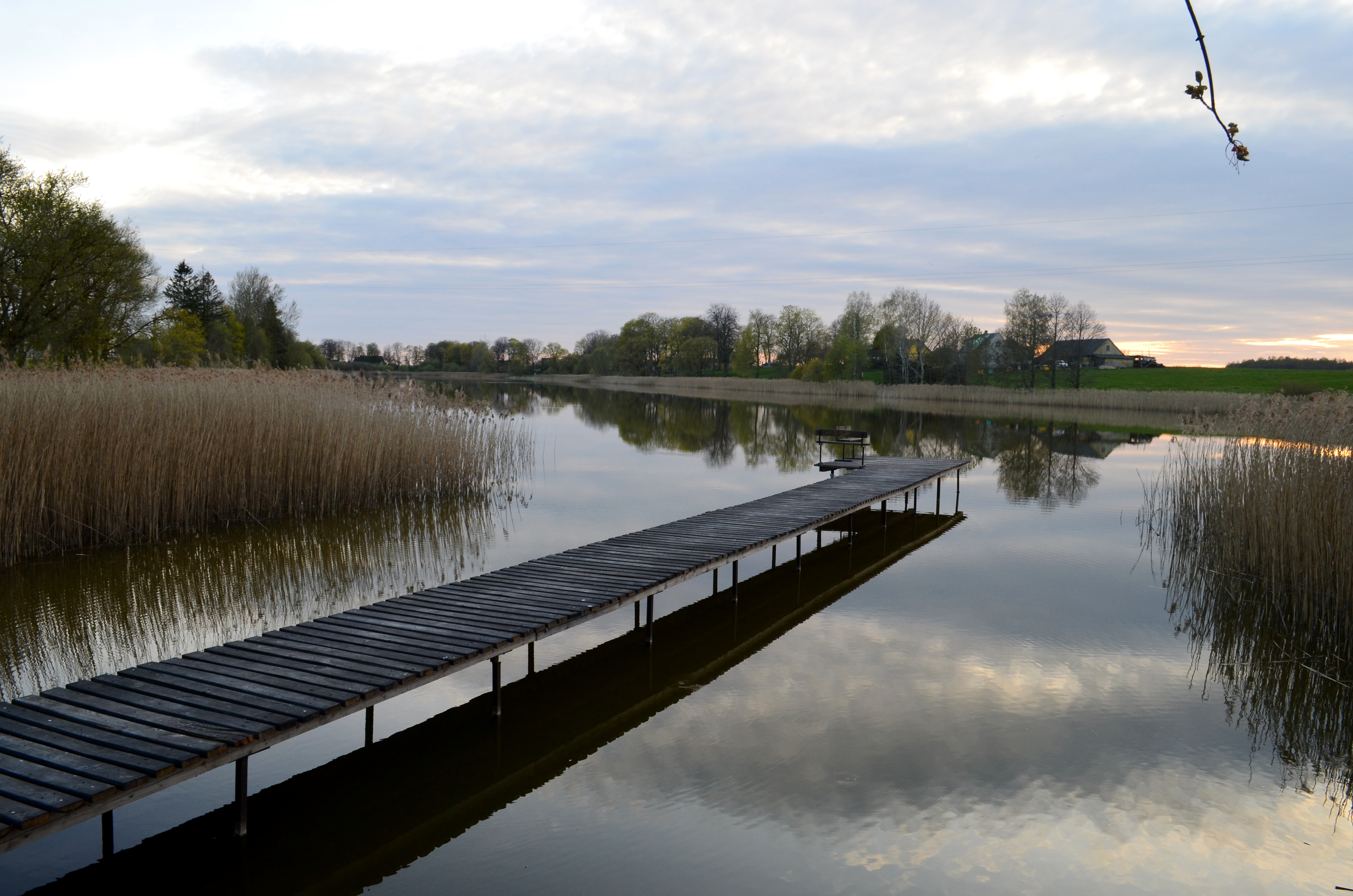
- Rukai Lake from the eastern coast

- Location within Lithuania Location within Kėdainiai District Municipality
- Location: Kėdainiai District Municipality, Lithuania
- Coordinates: 55°27′51″N 23°44′28″E
- Part of: Dotnuvėlė→Nevėžis→Neman→Baltic Sea
- Max. length: 0.7 km (0.43 mi)
- Max. width: 0.1 km (0.062 mi)
- Surface area: 0.064 km^{2} (0.025 sq mi)
- Shore length^{1}: 1.5 km (0.93 mi)
- Surface elevation: 92.9 m (305 ft)
- Settlements: Rukai
- ^{1} Shore length is not a well-defined measure.

The Rukai is a lake in Krakės Eldership, Kėdainiai District Municipality, central Lithuania. It is located 7 kilometres (4.3 mi) to the north from Krakės town, at Rukai village. It belongs to the Dotnuvėlė basin (part of the Nevėžis basin).

Coasts of the lake are flat, swampy, covered by reed beds.

The name Rukai comes from the village name Rukai.
