= Gudžiūnai =

- Town
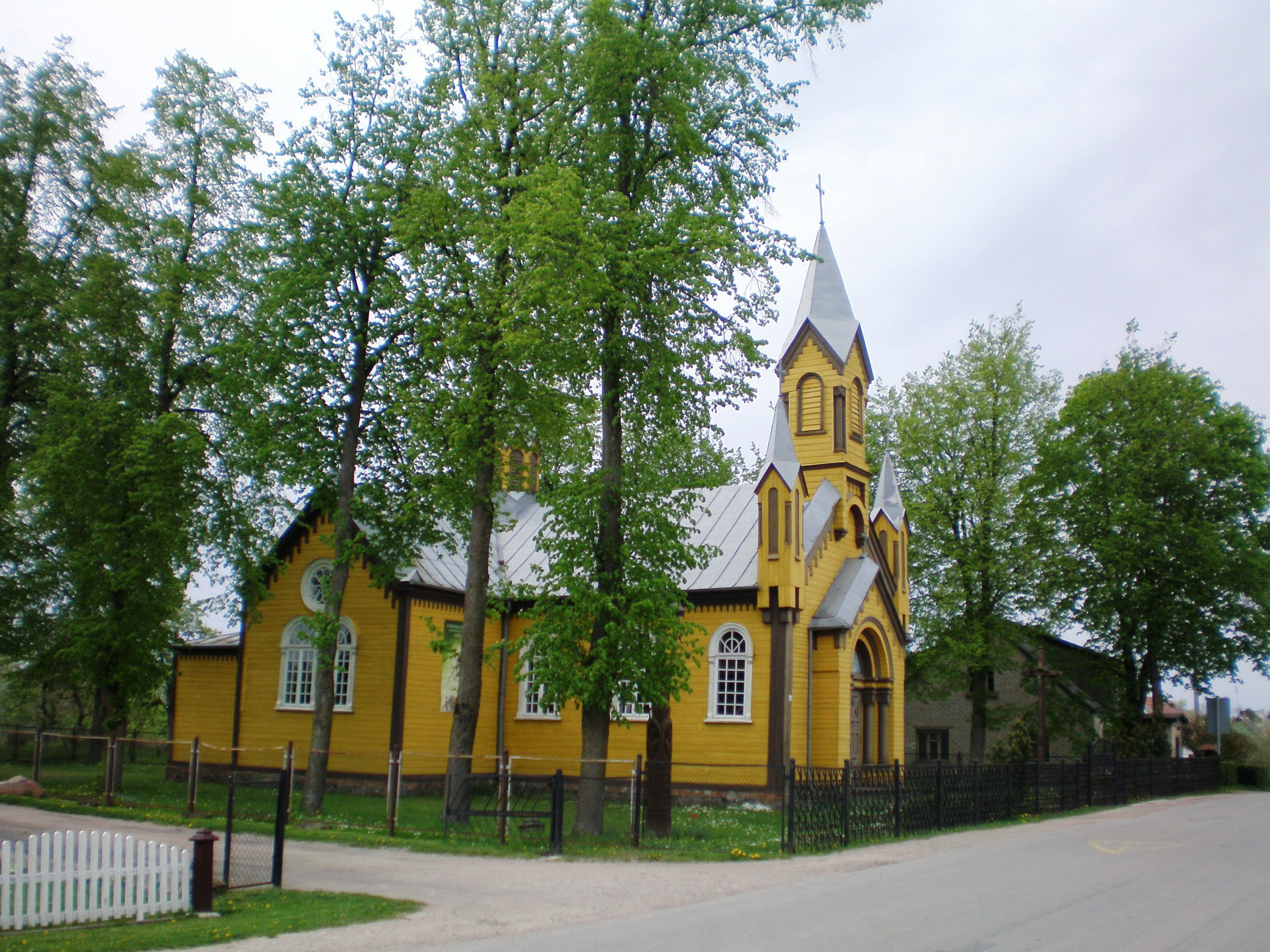
- Gudžiūnai church

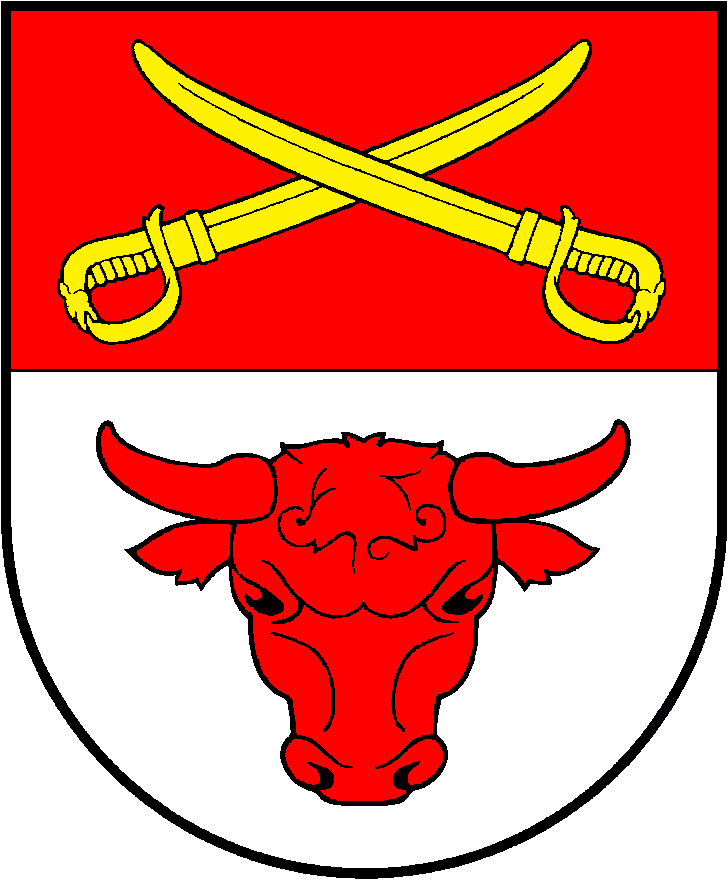
- Coat of arms

- Location of Gudžiūnai Gudžiūnai (Lithuania)
- Coordinates: 55°30′30″N 23°46′20″E
- Country: Lithuania
- Ethnographic region: Aukštaitija
- County: Kaunas County
- Municipality: Kėdainiai district municipality
- Eldership: Gudžiūnai Eldership
- Capital of: Gudžiūnai eldership
- First mentioned: 1653

Population (2011)
  - Total: 491
- Time zone: UTC+2 (EET)
  - Summer (DST): UTC+3 (EEST)

Gudžiūnai is a small town in Kėdainiai district, central Lithuania. It is located on the Dotnuvėlė River. The town has a Catholic Sacred Heart church, a secondary school, and a post office. There is also a train station (Gudžiūnai GS) just outside the town.

== Etymology ==
The town's name comes from a surname Gudžiū́nas with a common Lithuanian town suffix "-ūnai.", suggesting the place was named after a person or family. In other languages town's name is translated as: Polish: Gudziuny

== History ==
The name Gudžiūnai has been in use since at least 1653. The first church was built in 1812, and the current church was built in 1911. At the end of the 19th century, Gudžiūnai became a town, and from 1919 it was a district (valsčius) centre. During the Soviet occupation, Gudžiūnai was a kolkhoz main settlement.

== Demography ==
Historical population

Year	Pop.	±% p.a.
1820	330	—
1897	688	+0.96%
1902	675	−0.38%
1923	762	+0.58%

Year	Pop.	±% p.a.
1939	932	+1.27%
1959	752	−1.07%
1970	507	−3.52%
1977	810	+6.92%

Year	Pop.	±% p.a.
1979	893	+5.00%
1985	756	−2.74%
1989	719	−1.25%
2001	656	−0.76%

Year	Pop.	±% p.a.
2011	491	−2.86%

Source: 1902, 1923, 1959 & 1970, 1979, 1989, 2001, 2011

== Gallery ==
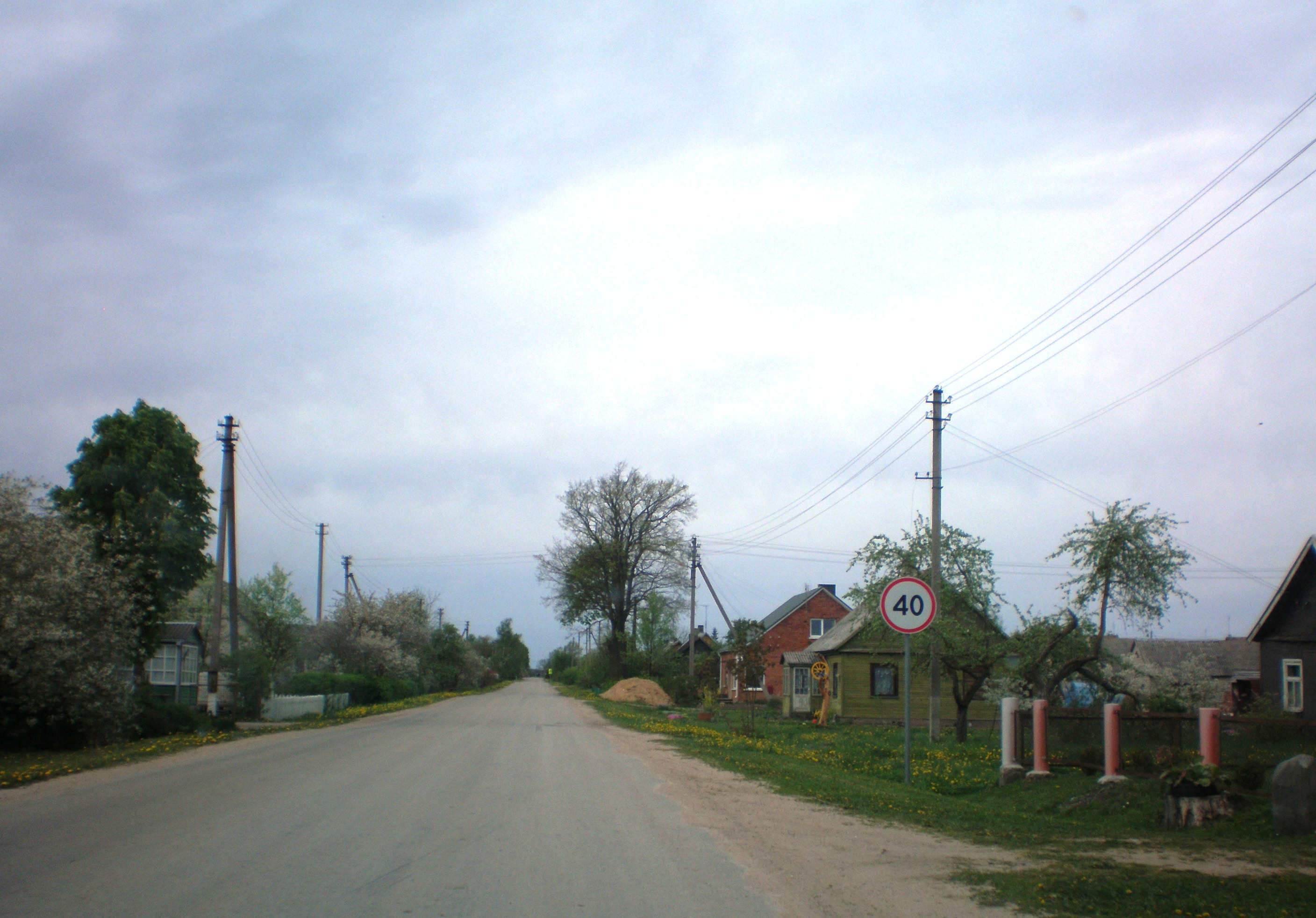
Tujų street

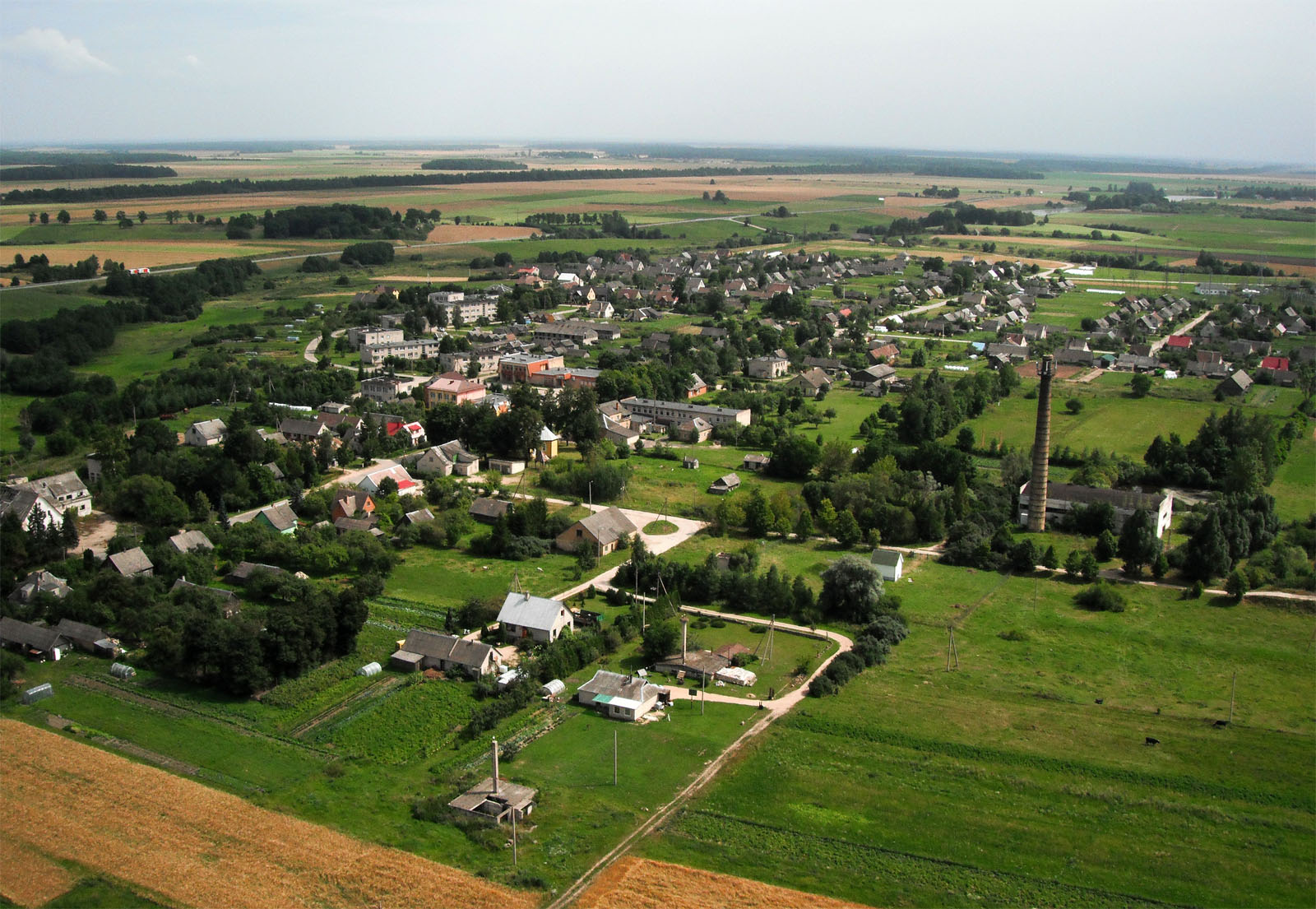
View from helicopter

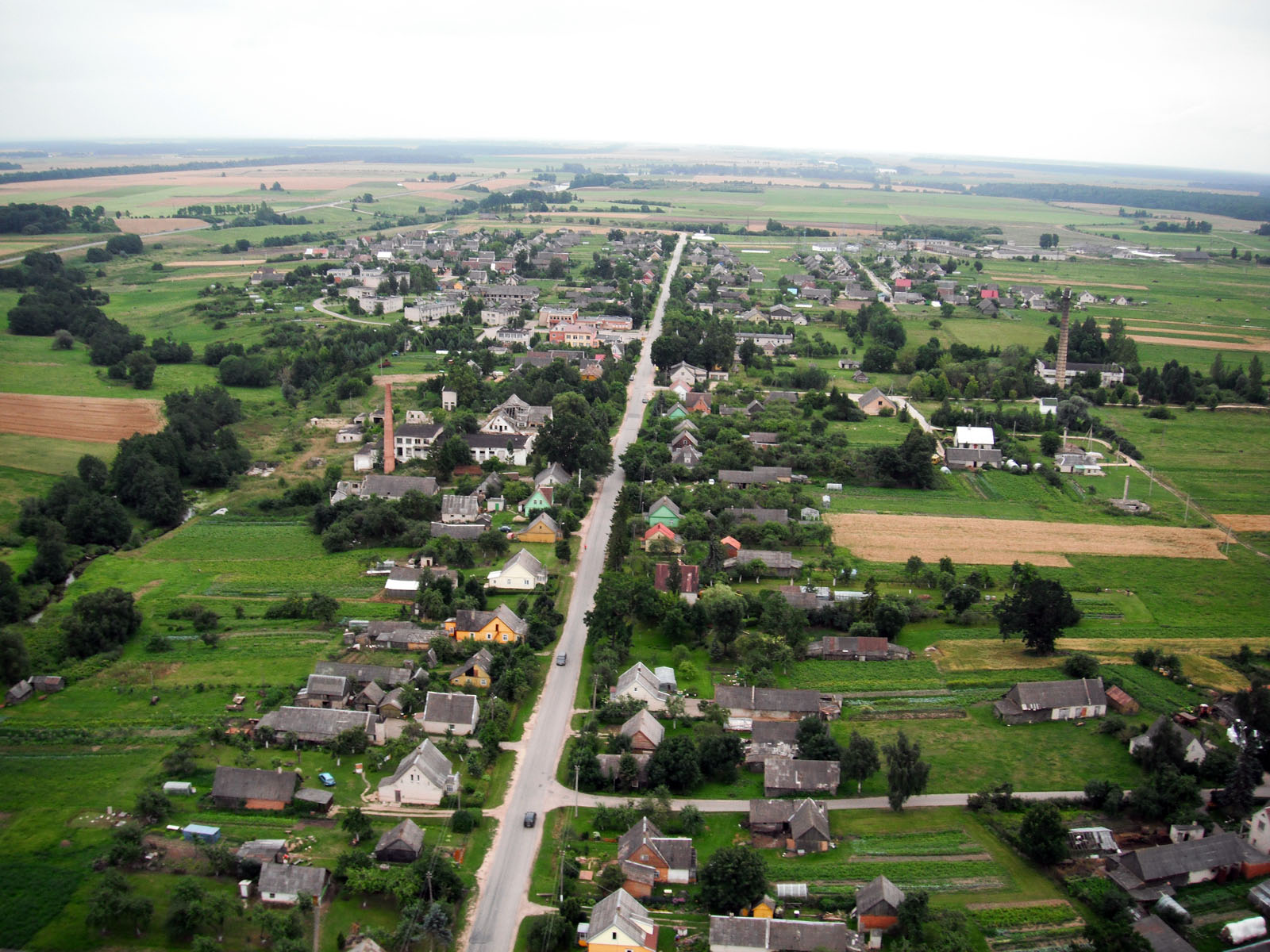

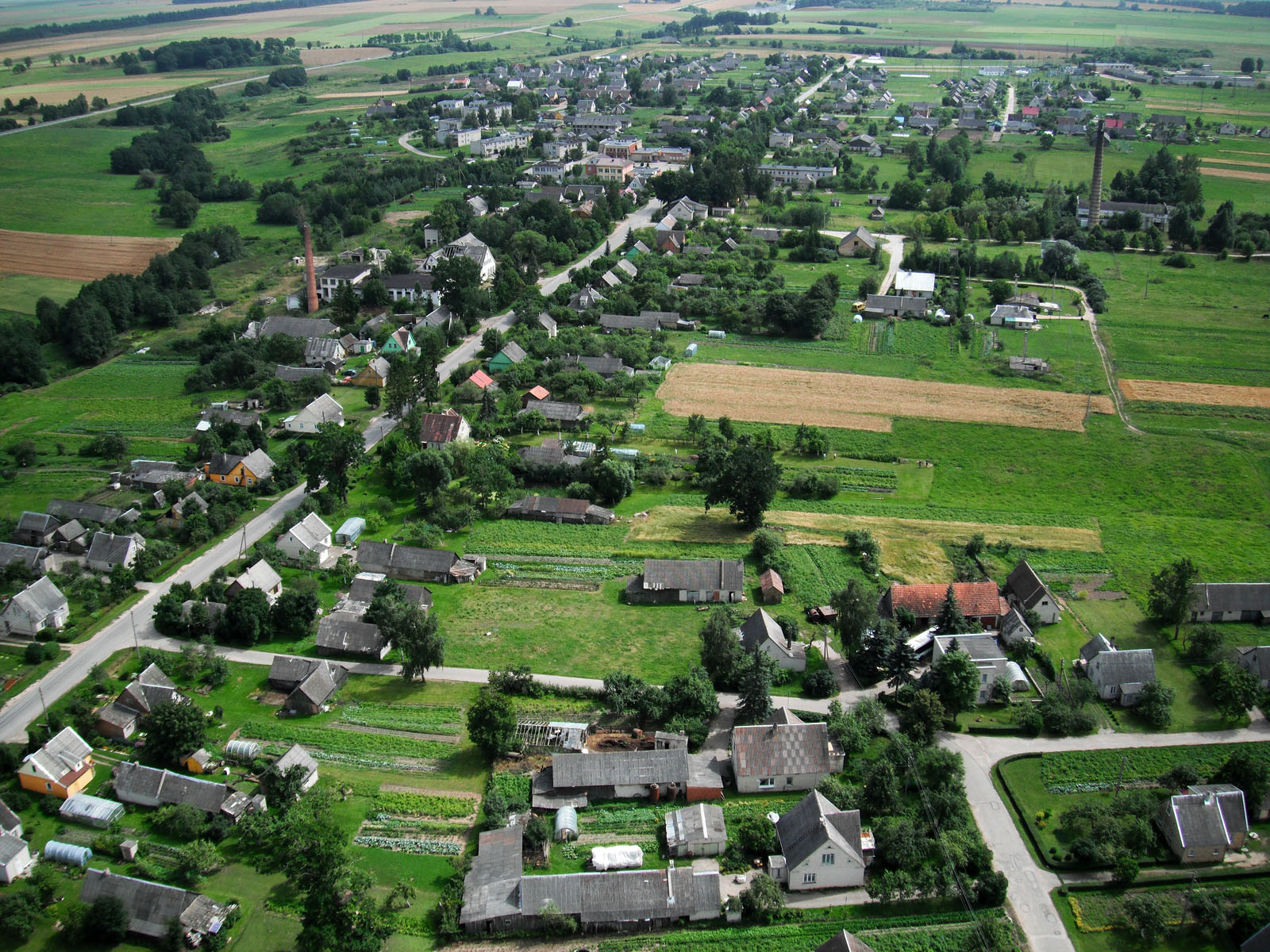
