= Sosiai Forest =

Sosiai Forest Lithuanian: Sosių miškas
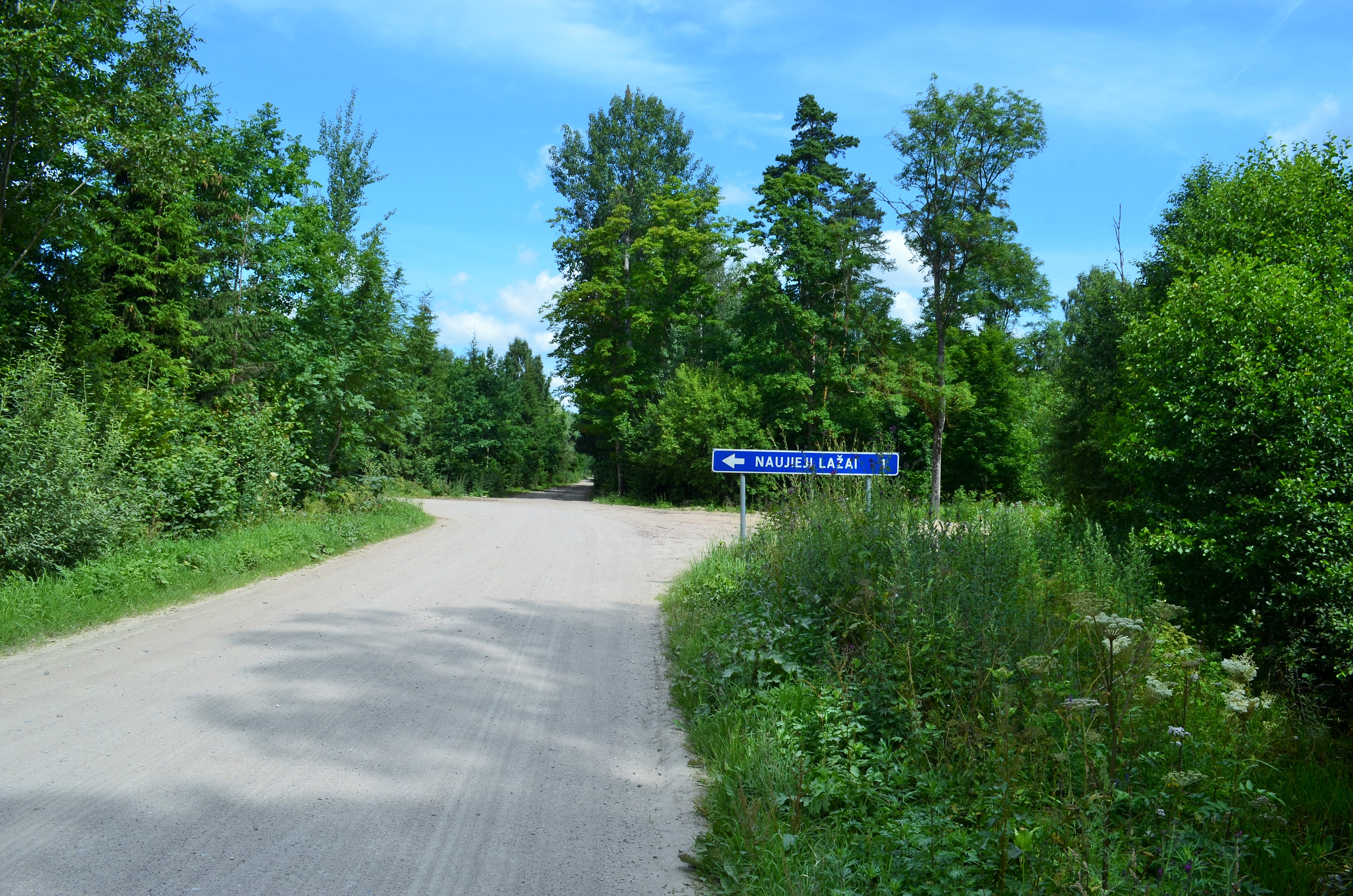
- Road to Naujieji Lažai through Sosiai forest

- Location within Lithuania

Geography
- Location: Kėdainiai District Municipality, Lithuania
- Coordinates: 55.469°N 23.944°E

Ecology
- Forest cover: birch, spruce
- Fauna: wild boar, roe deer

The Sosiai Forest (Lithuanian: Sosių miškas) is a forest in Kėdainiai District Municipality, central Lithuania, located to the south west from Surviliškis. The rivers Viešnautas and Žalčupys drain the forest. The villages Naujieji Lažai, Naujieji Bakainiai, Jogniškiai, Puodžiai, Alksnupiai surrounds the forest.

The forest area mostly is covered by birch and spruce trees.
