= Viešnautas =

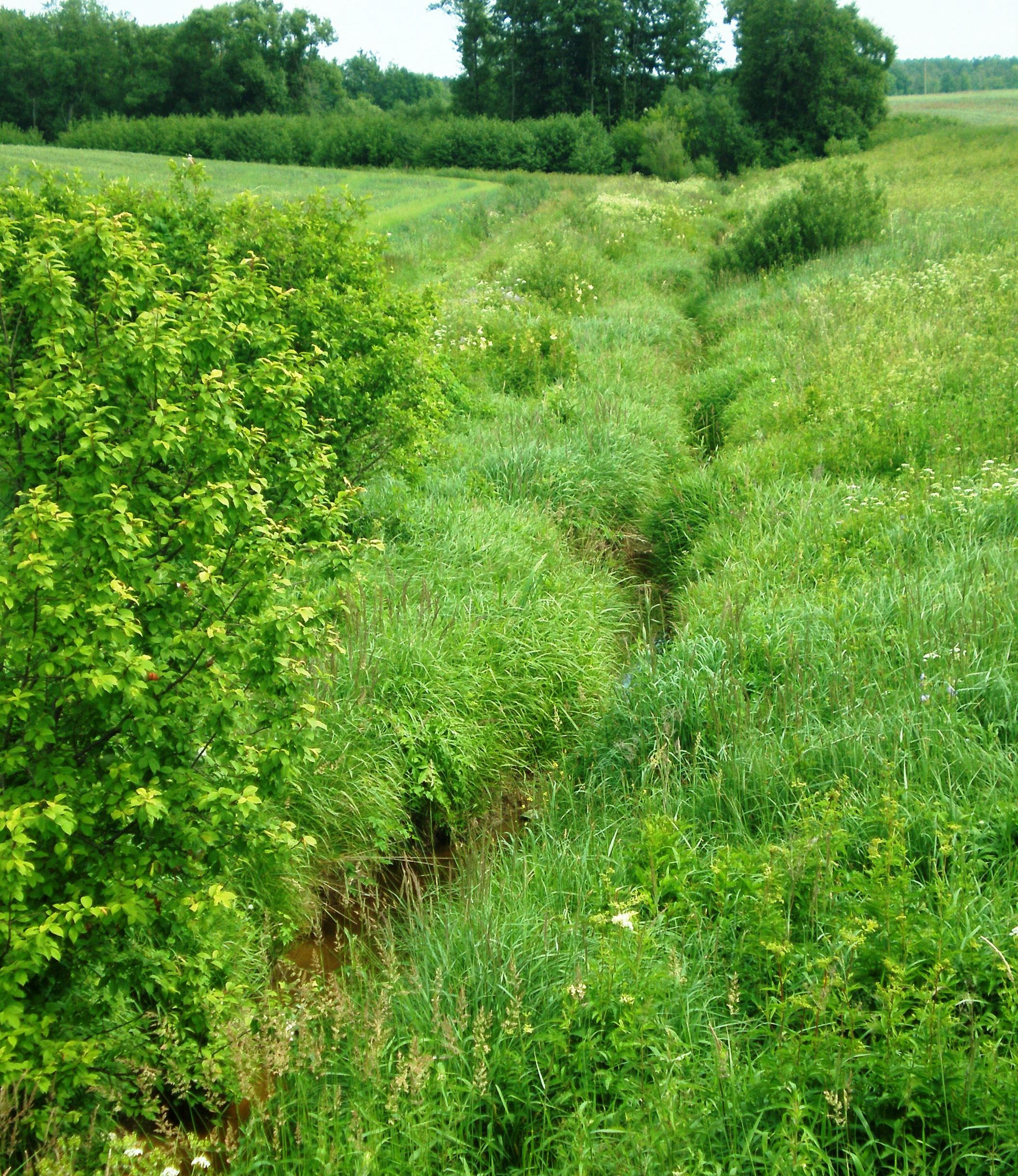

Location
- Country: Lithuania
- Region: Kėdainiai district municipality, Kaunas County

Physical characteristics
- Source
  - location: Serbentynė Forest
- Mouth: Liaudė in Trakupiai
  - coordinates: 55°29′40″N 23°57′47″E
- Length: c. 11 kilometres (6.8 mi)

Basin features
- Progression: Liaudė→ Nevėžis→ Neman→ Baltic Sea

The Viešnautas (or Trakupis) is a river of Kėdainiai district municipality, Kaunas County, central Lithuania. It is a tributary of the Liaudė, which flows into the Nevėžis, a tributary of the Neman.

It originates in the Serbentynė Forest, 3 km from Miegėnai village. It runs to the South East and East, on the western edge of the Sosiai forest. It passes through the villages Pamiškės, Antanava, Alksnupiai, Trakupiai.

The name Viešnautas possibly derives from the root *vieš- (original meaning 'to run, to flow') which may be connected to Sanskrit: veśanta ('pond'), Sanskrit: viṣa ('water, juice'), Sanskrit: viṣ-/veṣati ('to flow'), Latin: vīrus ('viscous, juicy'), Icelandic: veisa ('a swamp'). The name Trakupis means 'glade river' (from Lithuanian trakas 'a glade, cutting, undergrowth').
