= Trakupiai =

- Village
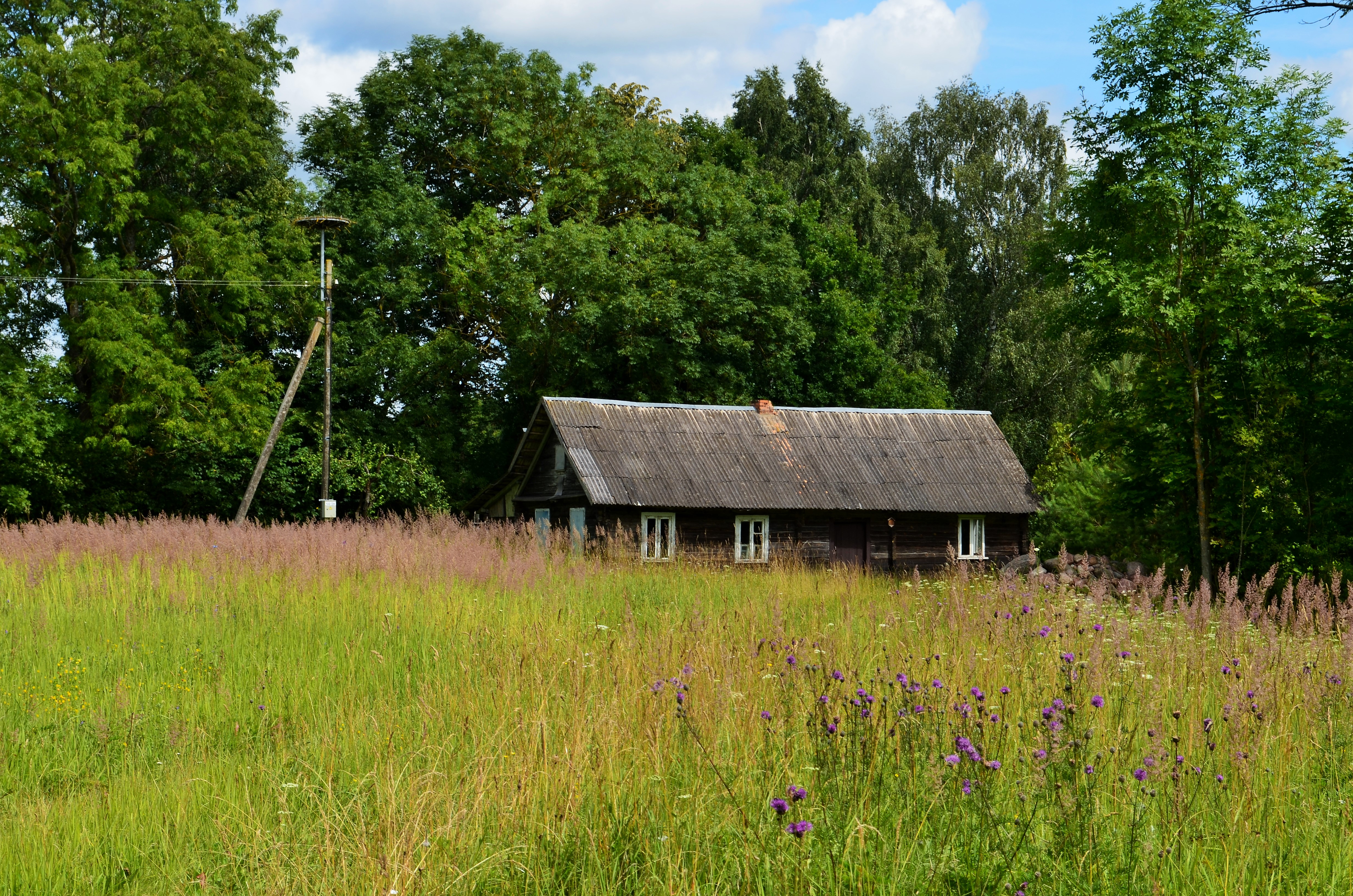

- Location in Lithuania
- Coordinates: 55°29′38″N 23°57′40″E
- Country: Lithuania
- County: Kaunas County
- Municipality: Kėdainiai district municipality
- Eldership: Gudžiūnai Eldership

Population (2011)
  - Total: 2
- Time zone: UTC+2 (EET)
  - Summer (DST): UTC+3 (EEST)

Trakupiai (formerly Russian: Трокупе) is a village in Kėdainiai district municipality, in Kaunas County, in central Lithuania. According to the 2011 census, the village had a population of 2 people. It is located 1 km from Paberžė, by the Liaudė river and its tributary Viešnautas, in the Paberžė landscape sanctuary.

== Demography ==
Historical population

Year	Pop.	±% p.a.
1923	22	—
1959	40	+1.67%
1970	52	+2.41%
1979	9	−17.71%

Year	Pop.	±% p.a.
1989	4	−7.79%
2001	1	−10.91%
2011	2	+7.18%

Source: 1902, 1923, 1959 & 1970, 1979, 1989, 2001, 2011
