= Jogniškiai =

- Village
- Location in Lithuania
- Coordinates: 55°28′08″N 23°58′08″E
- Country: Lithuania
- County: Kaunas County
- Municipality: Kėdainiai district municipality
- Eldership: Surviliškis Eldership

Population (2011)
  - Total: 0
- Time zone: UTC+2 (EET)
  - Summer (DST): UTC+3 (EEST)

Jogniškiai (formerly Russian: Іогнишки) is a village in Kėdainiai district municipality, in Kaunas County, in central Lithuania. According to the 2011 census, the village was uninhabited. It is located 5 km from Surviliškis, on the edge of Sosiai forest.

== Demography ==
Historical population

Year	Pop.	±% p.a.
1902	24	—
1923	57	+4.21%
1959	28	−1.96%
1970	26	−0.67%

Year	Pop.	±% p.a.
1979	10	−10.07%
1989	0	−100.00%
2001	0	0.00%
2011	0	0.00%

Source: 1902, 1923, 1959 & 1970, 1979, 1989, 2001, 2011
