= Naujieji Lažai =

- Village
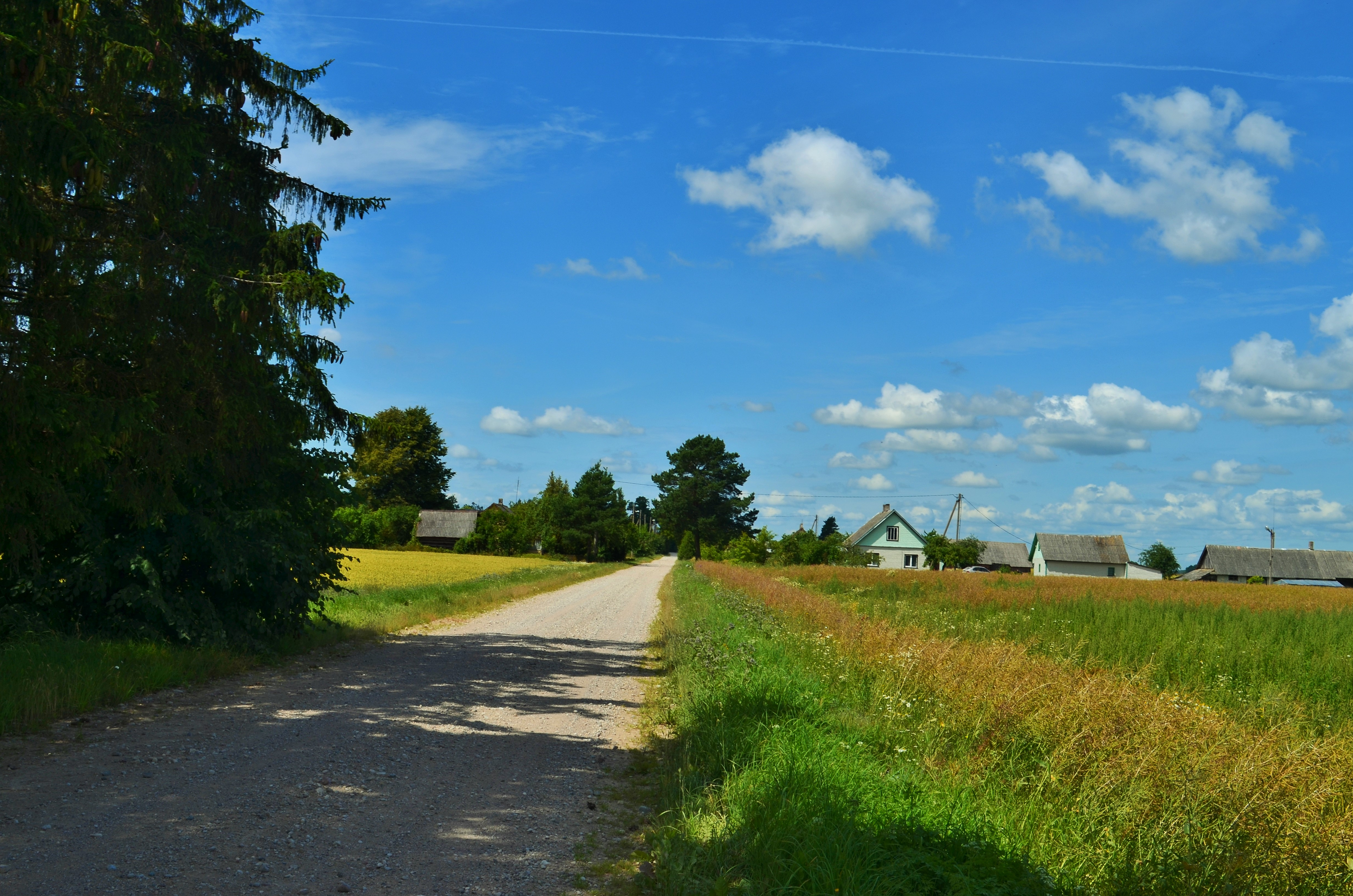

- Location in Lithuania Naujieji Lažai (Lithuania)
- Coordinates: 55°28′01″N 23°55′01″E
- Country: Lithuania
- County: Kaunas County
- Municipality: Kėdainiai district municipality
- Eldership: Dotnuva Eldership

Population (2011)
  - Total: 30
- Time zone: UTC+2 (EET)
  - Summer (DST): UTC+3 (EEST)

Naujieji Lažai (formerly Russian: Ложе-Новые) is a village in Kėdainiai district municipality, in Kaunas County, in central Lithuania. According to the 2011 census, the village has a population of 30 people. It is located 3 km (1.9 mi) from Miegėnai, by the Sosiai forest.

Because of bad roads and its remoteness the village had a nickname Klaipėda.

== Demography ==
Historical population

Year	Pop.	±% p.a.
1902	202	—
1923	261	+1.23%
1959	141	−1.70%
1970	137	−0.26%

Year	Pop.	±% p.a.
1979	109	−2.51%
1989	59	−5.95%
2001	54	−0.74%
2011	27	−6.70%

Source: 1902, 1923, 1959 & 1970, 1979, 1989, 2001, 2011
