= Alksnupiai =

- Hamlet
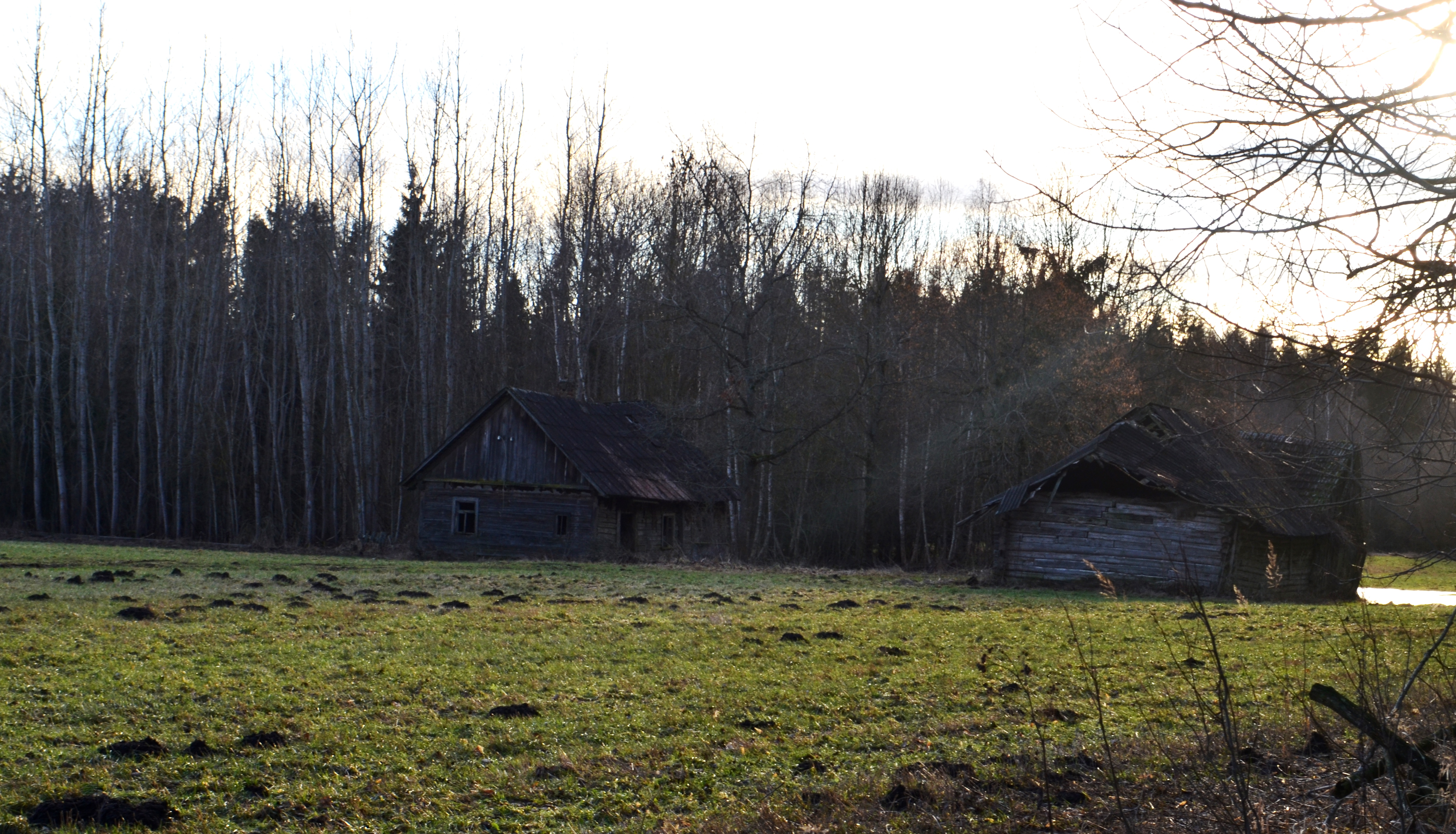

- Location in Lithuania
- Coordinates: 55°29′31″N 23°55′59″E
- Country: Lithuania
- County: Kaunas County
- Municipality: Kėdainiai district municipality
- Eldership: Gudžiūnai Eldership

Population (2011)
  - Total: 0
- Time zone: UTC+2 (EET)
  - Summer (DST): UTC+3 (EEST)

Alksnupiai is a hamlet in Kėdainiai district municipality, in Kaunas County, in central Lithuania. According to the 2011 census, the hamlet was uninhabited. It is located 1 km from Miegėnai, by the Viešnautas river.

== Demography ==
Historical population

Year	Pop.	±% p.a.
1923	31	—
1959	21	−1.08%
1970	22	+0.42%
1979	9	−9.45%

Year	Pop.	±% p.a.
1989	6	−3.97%
2001	3	−5.61%
2011	0	−100.00%

Source: 1902, 1923, 1959 & 1970, 1979, 1989, 2001, 2011
